= List of people with surname Evans =

A number of notable people have the surname Evans:

A list of fictional characters bearing the surname Evans is at the bottom of the page.

== A ==
- Aaron Evans (footballer) (born 1993), Australian footballer (soccer)
- Abel Evans (1679–1737), English clergyman, academic and poet
- Adam Evans (born 1994), Irish footballer
- Adriana Evans (born 1974), American R&B soul singer-songwriter
- Adrienne Evans, British media and communications academic
- Akayleb Evans (born 2000), American football player
- Al Evans (1916–1979), American baseball player and manager
- Alana Evans (born 1976), American pornographic actress
- Alasdair Evans (born 1989), Scottish cricketer
- Alastair Ivan Ladislaus Lucidus d'Oyley-Evans, or Ivan, Viscount d'Oyley (1880–1904), US fencer for France
- Albert Evans (disambiguation), multiple people
  - Albert Evans (footballer, born 1874) (1874–1966), footballer for Aston Villa, manager of Coventry City
  - Albert Evans (footballer, born 1901) (1901–1969), footballer for Woking, Tottenham Hotspur and Grantham
  - Albert Evans (politician) (1903–1988), British Labour Party politician
  - Albert Evans (dancer) (1968–2015), American; New York City Ballet principal dancer
  - Albert Evans (American football) (born 1989), US American football safety
- Alec Evans (born 1939), Australian rugby union player and coach
- Alex Evans (model) (born 1989), British fashion model and winner of Britain's Next Top Model, Cycle 4
- Alex Evans (video game developer), English video game developer and co-founder of Media Molecule
- Alexander Evans (disambiguation), multiple people
- Alfred Evans (cricketer, born 1858) (1858–1934), English cricketer
- Alfred Evans (politician) (1914–1987), British Labour politician
- Sir Alfred Evans (Royal Navy officer) (1884–1944), British admiral and cricketer
- Alfred John Evans (1889–1960), English cricketer
- Alice Evans (born 1968), US-born, British actress
- Alice Catherine Evans (1881–1975), American microbiologist
- Alison Evans, British economist
- Alan, Allan, Allen and Alun Evans (disambiguation), multiple people
  - Alan Evans (1949–1999), Welsh darts player
    - Allan Evans (disambiguation), or Alan Evans, multiple people
    - Allan Evans (Australian sportsman) (1897–1955), Western Australian cricketer and footballer
    - Allan Evans (footballer) (1956–2020), Scotland international footballer and Aston Villa player
    - Allan Evans (record producer) (born 1956), American musicologist and record producer
      - Allen V. Evans (born 1939), American politician in West Virginia
        - Alun Evans (born 1949), English footballer
        - Alun Evans (FAW) (1942–2011), Football Association of Wales Secretary General
        - Alun Evans (New Zealand footballer) (born 1965), New Zealand footballer
        - Alun Evans (cricketer) (born 1975), Welsh cricketer
        - Alun Tan Lan (Evans), Welsh singer-songwriter
- Alvin Evans (1845–1906), American congressman from Pennsylvania
- Alwen M. Evans (1895 - 1937), British entomologist and academic
- Amy Evans (1884–1983), Welsh soprano and actress
- Amy Burkhard Evans, American actress and musical director
- Andrea Evans (1957–2023), American actress
- Andrew and Andy Evans (disambiguation), multiple people
  - Andrew Evans (pastor) (1935–2023), Australian Pentecostal Christian pastor and politician
    - Andy Evans (racing driver) (born 1951), American former racing driver
    - Andy Evans (footballer) (born 1975), Welsh footballer
- Ann Evans (midwife) (c.1840–1916), New Zealand nurse, midwife and refreshment rooms proprietor
- Anne Evans (arts patron) (1871–?), art patron in Colorado
- Anne Evans Estabrook, née Anne Evans, American real estate developer
- Anna Evans Murray (1857–1955), American advocate of early childhood education
- Annette Evans (born 1944), Scottish lawn bowler
- Anthony Evans (disambiguation), multiple people
  - Anthony Walton White Evans (1817–1886), American civil engineer
  - Anthony Evans (judge) (born 1934), retired judge of the Court of Appeal of England and Wales
  - Anthony G. Evans (1942–2009), professor of mechanical engineering
  - Anthony Evans (skier) (born 1969), Australian cross country skier
  - Anthony Evans (basketball) (born 1970), head basketball coach at Florida International University
  - Anthony Evans (singer) (born 1978), American Christian singer-songwriter
- Arise Evans (1607–1660), Welsh prophet and fanatic
- Arthur Evans (disambiguation), multiple people
  - Art Evans (baseball) (1911–1952), Major League Baseball pitcher
  - Art Evans (1942–2024), American actor
    - Arthur Benoni Evans (1781–1854), British writer
    - Arthur Evans (1851–1941), English archeologist
    - Arthur Humble Evans (1855–1943), British ornithologist
    - A. Grant Evans (1858–1929), American university administrator
    - Arthur Evans (goalkeeper) (1868–?), played football in the 1890s for Stoke FC
    - Arthur "Slim" Evans (1890–1944), Canadian trade unionist leader in Canada and the US
    - Arthur Evans (VC) (1891–1936), British soldier awarded the Victoria Cross
    - Arthur Evans (politician) (1898–1958), British Labour MP for Cardiff South, 1931–1945
    - Arthur Evans (1903–1952), miner, boxer, rugby union and rugby league footballer known as Candy Evans
    - Arthur Reginald Evans (1905–1989), Australian army officer
    - Arthur Charles Evans (1916–2011), author of Sojourn in Silesia: 1940 – 1945
    - Arthur Evans (author) (1942–2011), gay rights activist, author of Witchcraft and the Gay Counterculture
- Audrey Evans (1925–2022), British-born American pediatric oncologist
- Augusta Jane Evans (1835–1909), American novelist

== B ==
- Bárbara Evans (born 1991), Brazilian model and reality TV celebrity
- Barnaby Evans, American artist
- Barry Evans (disambiguation), multiple people
  - Barry Evans (actor) (1943–1997), English actor and television performer
  - Barry Evans (baseball) (born 1956), American Major League Baseball third baseman
  - Barry Evans (rugby union) (born 1962), English rugby player
  - Barry Evans (footballer, born 1963), Australian rules footballer for Collingwood
- Bart Evans (polo), American polo player
- Bart Evans (baseball) (born 1970), American baseball player
- Ben and Benjamin Evans (disambiguation), multiple people
  - Ben Evans (rugby union) (born 1975), Welsh rugby union player
  - Ben Evans (rugby league) (born 1992), Welsh rugby league player
    - Benjamin Evans (minister) (1740–1821), Welsh congregational minister
    - Benjamin Evans (Baptist minister) (1844–1900), Welsh clergyman and Secretary of the Baptist Missionary Society
    - Benjamin Evans, Baron Evans of Hungershall (1899–1982), British academic
- Bentley Kyle Evans (born 1966), American TV writer, producer, director and actor
- Bernard Evans (architect) (1905–1981), Australian army officer and architect
- Bernard Evans (footballer) (1937–2019), English footballer
- Bernie Evans (born 1957), Australian rules footballer
- Bert Evans (1922–2008), Welsh-American footballer (soccer)
- Bertram Evans (1872–1919), English cricketer
- Beryl Evans (1922–2006), Australian politician
- Bill, Billie and Billy Evans (disambiguation), multiple people
  - Bill Evans (rugby union) (1857–1935), Welsh rugby union international
  - Bill Evans (1910s pitcher) (1893–1946), American baseball player for the Pirates
  - Bill Evans (1940s pitcher) (1919–1983), American baseball player for the Red Sox and White Sox
  - Bill Evans (1929–1980), American jazz pianist and composer
  - Bill Evans (dancer), American dancer and choreographer
  - Bill Evans (saxophonist) (born 1958), American jazz saxophonist
  - Bill Evans (meteorologist) (born 1960), American; Eyewitness News This Morning
    - Billie Evans, married name of British singer and actress Billie Piper when she was married to DJ Chris Evans
      - Billy Evans (1884–1956), American baseball umpire
      - Billy Evans (footballer, born 1921) (1921–1960), English football player
      - Billy Lee Evans (born 1941), American politician from Georgia
      - Billy Evans (1932–2020), American college and international basketball player
      - Billy Evans (born 1947), American professional basketball player
- Blair Evans (born 1991), Australian swimmer
- Blake Evans (born 1980), Canadian ice hockey centre
- Bob and Bobby Evans (disambiguation), multiple people
  - Bob Evans (footballer) (Robert Owen Evans, 1881–1962), 1900s-era Welsh goalkeeper
  - Bob Evans (coach) (Melbourne C. "Bob" Evans), 1910s-era American university sports coach
  - Bob Evans (restaurateur) (1918–2007), restaurateur and founder of Bob Evans Restaurants
  - Bob Evans (rugby union) (1921–2003), Wales international rugby union player
  - Bob Evans (basketball) (1925–1997), American NBA player
  - Bob O. Evans (1927–2004), computer pioneer and corporate executive
  - Bob Evans (racing driver) (born 1947), British Formula One driver
  - Bob Evans (wrestler) (born 1972), American professional wrestler and trainer
    - Bobby Evans (footballer) (1927–2001), Scottish footballer who played for Celtic and Chelsea F.C.
    - Bobby Evans (Canadian football) (born 1967), Canadian football player
- Brad Evans (disambiguation), multiple people
- Brendan Evans (born 1986), American tennis player
- Brennan Evans (born 1982), Canadian ice hockey player
- Brett Evans (Australian footballer) (born 1972), Australian rules footballer from Victoria
- Brett Evans (soccer, born 1982), South African footballer
- Brian Evans (disambiguation), multiple people
  - Brian Evans (cricketer, born 1936) (1936–2011), Glamorgan and Lincolnshire cricketer
  - Brian Evans (footballer) (1940–2003), Welsh footballer
  - Brian Evans (politician) (born 1950), Canadian lawyer and provincial politician from Alberta, Canada
  - Brian Evans (cricketer, born 1964), Hertfordshire cricketer
  - Brian Evans (basketball) (born 1973), American basketball player
- Bruce Evans (politician) (1925–2012), Australian politician
- Bruce Evans (bishop) (1929–1993), Anglican bishop and author
- Bruce A. Evans (born 1946), American film director
- Bryn Evans (rugby league) (1899–1975), English rugby league footballer
- Bryn Evans (rugby union, born 1902)
- Bryn Evans (rugby union, born 1984)
- Byron Evans (born 1964), American football linebacker

== C ==
- C. Lawrence Evans, American political scientist
- C. Stephen Evans (born 1948), American historian and philosopher
- Cadel Evans (born 1977), Australian cyclist
- Candy Evans (1903–1952), Welsh miner, boxer, rugby union and rugby league player
- Caradoc Evans (1878–1945), Welsh writer, novelist and playwright
- Ceri Evans (born 1963), New Zealand international footballer (soccer)
- Charles Evans (disambiguation), multiple people
- Charlie Evans (disambiguation), multiple people
- Charlotte Evans (born 1991), British skier, sighted guide and paralympian
  - Charlotte Evans, English actress
- Chea Waters Evans, American politician from Vermont
- Ched Evans, Welsh footballer
- Cheryl A. Gray Evans, Louisiana politician
- Chris Evans (disambiguation), multiple people
- Christine Evans (poet) (born 1943), English poet
- Christmas Evans (1766–1838), Welsh Nonconformist minister
- Christopher Evans (disambiguation), multiple people
  - Christopher Evans (outlaw) (1847–1917), American train robber
  - Christopher Evans (theologian) (1909–2012), English chaplain and theologian
  - Christopher Evans (computer scientist) (1931–1979), British computer scientist, psychologist and writer on pseudo-science
  - Christopher Evans (author) (born 1951), British author of science fiction and children's books
  - Christopher Leith Evans (born 1954), American artist
  - Christopher Evans-Ironside or Chris Evans, English/German composer and musician
  - Christopher Evans (businessman), Welsh biotech entrepreneur
  - Christopher Evans (musician) (born 1987), Ugandan composer, vocalist and entertainer
- Chuck Evans (fullback) (Charles Evans, 1967–2008), American football fullback
- Chuck Evans (basketball) (born 1971), American basketball player
- Cindy Evans (born 1952), American politician in Hawaii
- Claire L. Evans, American singer and writer
- Claude Evans (1933–1982), Canadian ice hockey goaltender
- Clay Evans (pastor) (1925–2019), influential 20th-century African-American Baptist pastor in Chicago
- Clay Evans (swimmer) (born 1953), Canadian Olympic swimmer
- Clement A. Evans (1833–1911), American Civil War Confederate general
- Clif Evans (1948–2022), Canadian provincial politician (Manitoba)
- Cliff Evans (rugby league), Welsh rugby league player in the 1930s and 1940s
- Clifford Evans (disambiguation), multiple people
- Clint Evans (baseball) (1889–1975), American college baseball coach
- Clint Evans (rower), British rower
- Clive Evans (fashion designer) (born 1933), English fashion designer
- Clive Evans (footballer) (born 1957), English footballer
- Clyde Evans (1938–2021), American politician in Ohio
- Colin Evans (rugby) (1936–1992), Welsh rugby union and rugby league international
- Colin Evans (medium), Welsh fraudster
- Columbus Evans (1824–1854), American politician, newspaper editor, and soldier
- Corky Evans (born 1948), US-born Canadian politician in British Columbia
- Corry Evans (born 1990), Northern Irish footballer
- Craig Evans (disambiguation), multiple people
  - Craig Evans (Australian footballer) (born 1965), Australian rules footballer who played in the VFL
  - Craig Evans (Zimbabwean sportsman) (born 1969), Zimbabwean cricketer and rugby union footballer
  - Craig Evans (Welsh cricketer) (born 1971), former Welsh cricket batsman
  - Craig A. Evans (21st century), Canadian biblical scholar
  - Craig Evans (boxer) (born 1989), Welsh boxer
- Cyril Furmstone Evans (1892–1959), wireless telegraphist, associated with the RMS Titanic
- Cyril Edward Evans (1896–1975), New Zealand cricketer and rugby player

== D ==
- Dai Evans (1872–1912), Welsh rugby union international
- Dai Evans (footballer, born 1902) (1902–1951), Welsh international footballer
- Dai Morgan Evans (1944–2017), British archaeologist and academic
- Dailan Evans (born 1971), Australian actor and comedian
- Dale Evans (1912–2001), American actress and Roy Rogers's wife
- Daly Cherry-Evans (born 1989), Australian Rugby League player
- Damaris Evans (born 1975), British fashion designer
- Damon Evans (actor) (born 1949), American actor
- Damon Evans (athletic director), American collegiate athletics director
- Dan Evans (baseball) (born 1960), American baseball executive
- Dan Evans (rugby union) (born 1988), Welsh rugby union player
- Dana Evans (athletic director) (1874–1924), American (male) coach in multiple sports and college athletic administrator
- Dana Evans (born 1998), American women's basketball player
- Dani Evans (born 1985), American fashion model
- Daniel Evans (disambiguation), multiple people
  - Daniel Evans (minister) (1774–1835), Welsh independent Christian minister
  - Daniel Evans (Welsh poet) (Daniel Ddu o Geredigion) (1792–1846), Welsh poet
  - Daniel Silvan Evans (1818–1903), Welsh scholar and lexicographer
  - Daniel J. Evans (1925–2024), Governor of Washington and United States Senator
  - Daniel Evans (singer) (born 1969), X Factor 2008 finalist
  - Daniel Evans (actor) (born 1973), Welsh actor
  - Daniel Evans (tennis) (born 1990), English tennis player
- Danielle Valore Evans, American writer
- Danny Evans (cricketer) (born 1987), Middlesex cricketer
- Darrell Evans (born 1947), American baseball player
- Darrell Evans (musician), presumably American musician
- Darren Evans (born 1988), US American footballer
- Darrynton Evans (born 1998), American football player
- Daryl Evans (born 1961), Canadian ice hockey player
- David Evans (disambiguation), multiple people
  - Dave Evans (racing driver) (1898–1974), American racecar driver
  - Dave Evans (footballer) (born 1958), English footballer
  - Dave Evans (reporter) (born 1962), American reporter with WABC-TV
    - David Evans (MP for Cardiff) (died 1568), MP for Cardiff
    - David Evans (Canon at St Asaph) (1705–1788), Welsh clergyman and writer
    - David R. Evans (South Carolina politician) (1769–1843), U.S. Representative from South Carolina
    - David Ellicott Evans (1788–1850), U.S. Representative from New York, 1827
    - David Morier Evans (1819–1874), financial journalist
    - David Evans (Archdeacon of St Asaph) (died 1910), Welsh priest
    - David H. Evans (1837–1920), New York politician
    - David William Evans (1866–1926), Welsh lawyer, public servant and rugby international
    - David Evans (cricketer, born 1869) (1869–1907), 22 first-class matches between 1889 and 1902
    - David Evans (composer) (1874–1948), Welsh composer
    - David Evans (rugby, born 1886) (1886–1940), rugby union and rugby league footballer who played in the 1900s, and 1910s
    - David Emrys Evans (1891/2–1966), Welsh classicist and university principal
    - David Evans (microbiologist) (1909–1984), British microbiologist
    - David Morgan Evans (1911–1941), Welsh rugby union and rugby league footballer
    - David Arthur Evans (1915–1989), Canadian politician in the Legislative Assembly of Ontario
    - David Stanley Evans (1916–2004), British astronomer
    - David C. Evans (computer scientist) (1924–1998), American computer graphics pioneer
    - David Evans (RAF officer) (1924–2020), Air Chief Marshal/Senior Commander in the Royal Air Force
    - David Evans (RAAF officer) (1925–2020), Air Marshal in the Royal Australian Air Force
    - David Evans (Somerset cricketer, born 1928) (1928–1991), eight first-class matches in 1953
    - David Evans (Victorian politician) (born 1934), Australian politician in the Victorian Legislative Council
    - David Evans (umpire) (1933–1990), cricketer with Glamorgan and Test match umpire
    - David Evans (MP for Welwyn Hatfield) (1935–2008), British businessman and Conservative politician, MP 1987–1997
    - David Evans (mathematician) (1940–2026), professor of applied mathematics at University of Bristol
    - David Allan Evans (born 1940), American poet
    - David A. Evans (1941–2022), organic chemistry professor at Harvard University
    - David Evans, Baron Evans of Watford (born 1942), British trade unionist and businessman
    - David Evans (West Virginia politician) (born 1945), member of the West Virginia House of Delegates
    - David W. Evans (born 1946), U.S. Representative from Indiana, 1975–1983
    - David Andreoff Evans (born 1948), computational linguist, entrepreneur
    - David F. Evans (born 1951), American leader in The Church of Jesus Christ of Latter-day Saints
    - Dave Evans (singer), first lead singer of the rock band AC/DC
    - David S. Evans (born 1954), economist and lecturer at UCL and the University of Chicago Law School
    - David Howell Evans (born 1961), guitarist of Irish rock band U2, better known as The Edge
    - David M. Evans (born 1962), American movie director, producer, writer and actor
    - David Evans (athlete) (born 1967), Australian Paralympian
    - David Evans (footballer) (born 1967), English footballer with Chester City
    - David Evans (Yale professor) (born 1970), professor of geology and geophysics at Yale University
    - David Evans (squash player) (born 1974), Welsh professional squash player
    - David Evans (rugby union, born 1988) (born 1988), Welsh Sevens and Neath RFC
    - David E. Evans, professor of mathematics at Cardiff University
    - David Evans (musicologist), ethnomusicologist at the University of Memphis
- De Scott Evans (1847–1898), American artist
- Dean Evans (field hockey) (born 1967), Australian Olympic field hockey player
- Dean Evans (born 1990), Australian soccer player
- Debbie Evans (born 1958), American motorcycle observed-trials competitor and stunt rider
- Deborah Evans-Quek (born 1961), Welsh chess master
- Debra Evans (born 1953), American writer
- De Lacy Evans (1787–1870), British Army general
- Delyth Evans (born 1958), Welsh politician
- Demetric Evans (born 1979), American football defensive end
- Demi Evans (born 1960s), American jazz vocalist
- Denis and Dennis Evans (disambiguation), multiple people
  - Denis Evans (born 1951), Australian scientist
    - Dennis Frederick Evans (1928–1990), English inorganic chemist
    - Dennis Evans (footballer, born 1930) (1930–2000), English footballer who played for Arsenal
    - Dennis Evans (footballer, born 1935), British footballer who played for Wrexham and Tranmere Rovers
- DeQuin Evans (born 1987), Canadian football defensive linesman
- Derrick Evans (born 1952), Jamaican-born British exercise instructor known as Mr. Motivator
- Diana Evans (born 1971), English novelist
- Diane Carlson Evans (born 1946), American nurse
- Dick Evans (footballer) (1875–1942), English footballer
- Dick Evans (American football) (1917–2008), American football player
- Dik Evans (born 1950s), Irish rock guitarist, brother of 'The Edge'
- Dixie Evans (1926–2013), American burlesque dancer and stripper
- Doc Evans (1907–1977), American jazz cornetist
- Dominic Evans (born 1970), Welsh racing driver
- Don and Donald Evans (disambiguation), multiple people
  - Don Evans (1938–2003), American playwright, theatre director, actor and educator
    - Donald Evans (American poet) (1884–1921), American poet, publisher, music critic and journalist
    - Donald Randell Evans (1912–1975), Royal Air Force air chief marshal
    - Donald Evans (Welsh poet) (born 1940), Welsh poet, who writes in the Welsh language
    - Donald W. Evans Jr. (1943–1967), American soldier and Medal of Honor recipient
    - Donald Evans (artist) (1945–1977), American artist
    - Donald Evans (born 1946), US Secretary of Commerce (2001–2005)
    - Donald Leroy Evans (1957–1999), American serial killer
    - Donald Evans (American football) (born 1964), former American football defensive end
- Doreen Evans (1916–1982), British racing driver
- Doug and Douglas Evans (disambiguation), multiple people
  - Doug Evans (ice hockey) (born 1963), retired Canadian ice hockey player
  - Doug Evans (American football) (born 1970), retired American football player
  - Doug Evans (fighter) (born 1980), American lightweight mixed martial artist
    - Douglas Evans (actor) (1904–1968), American actor
    - Douglas Evans (children's author) (born 1953), American author
- Duane Evans Jr. (born 2003), New Zealand actor
- Dudley Evans (cricketer) (1886–1972), English cricketer
- Duncan Evans (born 1959), Welsh golfer
- Dwayne Evans (born 1958), American Olympic sprinter
- Dwight Evans (born 1951), American baseball player
- Dwight E. Evans (born 1954), American congressman
- Dylan Evans (born 1966), British academic and author

== E ==
- E. Everett Evans (1893–1958), American sci–fi author
- E. E. Evans-Pritchard (1902–1973), English anthropologist
- Ean Evans (1960–2009), American musician
- Earl Evans (American football) (1900–1991), American football player
- Earl Evans (scientist) (1910–1999), chairman of the biochemistry department at the University of Chicago
- Earl Evans (basketball) (1955–2012), American basketball player
- Edgar Evans (1876–1912), Welsh Polar explorer
- Edgar Evans (tenor) (1912–2007), Welsh opera singer
- Edith Evans (1888–1976), English actress
- Edmund Evans (1826–1905), English wood engraver and colour printer
- Edward Evans (disambiguation), multiple people
  - Edward Evans (divine) (fl. 1615) English devine
  - Edward Evans (poet) (1716–1798), Welsh poet
  - Edward Evans (printseller) (1789–1835) British printseller and compositor
  - Edward Payson Evans (1831–1917), American historian and linguist
  - Edward B. Evans (1846–1922), British philatelist and army officer
  - Edward Evans, 1st Baron Mountevans (1880–1957), British naval officer and Antarctic explorer
  - Edward Evans (British politician) (1883–1960), British Labour Party politician
  - Edward Evans (actor) (1914–2001), British actor
- Edwin Evans (cricketer) (1849–1921), Australian cricketer
- Edwin Evans (artist) (1860–1946), American painter from Utah
- Edwin Evans (music critic) (1874–1945), English music critic
- Eleanor Evans (1893–1969), Welsh actress, singer and stage director
- Elease Evans (born 1943), American politician in New Jersey
- Elfyn Evans (born 1988), Welsh rally driver
- Elle Evans (born 1989), American model and actress
- Elliot Evans (born 1995), English pop singer
- Ellis Humphrey Evans (1887–1917), Welsh poet who wrote under the bardic name Hedd Wyn
- Ellis Evans (1930–2013), Welsh academic
- Emanuel J. Evans, longest-serving mayor in Durham, North Carolina history (1951–1963)
- Emma Kickapoo (1880-1942), artists' model
- Emrys Evans (1891/2–1966), Welsh classicist and university principal
- Emyr Estyn Evans (1905–1989), Welsh geographer and archaeologist
- Enid Evans (1914–2011), New Zealand librarian
- Eric Evans (disambiguation), multiple people
  - Eric Evans (rugby union, born 1894) (1894–1955), Wales rugby union footballer and administrator
  - Eric Evans (rugby union, born 1921) (1921–1991), English rugby union footballer
  - Eric Evans (priest, born 1928) (1928–1996), Anglican priest and Dean of St Paul's (London)
  - Eric J. Evans (fl. 1966–2011), British academic and historian
  - Eric Evans (canoer) (born 1950), American competitive canoer
- Erika Evans, American lawyer and politician
- Erin M. Evans, American fantasy author
- Erma-Gene Evans (born 1984), Saint Lucian Olympic javelin thrower
- Ernest Evans (cricketer) (1861–1948), English cricketer who played for Somerset
- Ernest Evans (politician) (1885–1965), Welsh politician
- Ernest E. Evans (1908–1944), officer of the United States Navy in WWII and medal of honor recipient
- Ethan Evans (born 2001), American football player
- Ethel Evans (1866–1929), American impressionist painter
- Evan Evans (disambiguation), multiple people
  - Evan Evans (poet) (1731–1789), Welsh poet and antiquary
  - Evan Evans (minister) (1804–1886), Welsh dissenting minister
  - Evan Evans (academic) (1813–1891), Master of Pembroke College, Oxford and Vice-Chancellor of the University of Oxford
  - Evan W. Evans, Welsh-born American Wisconsin State Assemblyman
  - Evan Herber Evans (1836–1896), Welsh Nonconformist minister
  - Evan Alfred Evans (1876–1948), United States federal judge
  - Evan Evans (racing driver) (born 1965), off-road champion racing in Championship Off-Road Racing
  - Evan Evans (film composer) (born 1975), American film score composer
- Evans Evans (1932–2024), American actress

== F ==
- Faith Evans (U.S. Marshal) (1937–2014), American state legislator in Hawaii
- Faith Evans (born 1973), American singer-songwriter
- Felix Evans (1910–1993), American baseball player
- Florrie Evans (1884–1967), Welsh revivalist and missionary
- Sir Francis Evans, 1st Baronet (1840–1907), British MP for Southampton 1888–1895, 1896–1900 and Maidstone 1901–1906
- Francis Thomas Evans Sr. (1886–1974), pioneer aviator
- Francis Evans (diplomat) (1897–1983), British ambassador to Israel and to Argentina
- Francis C. Evans (1914–2002), American zoologist and ecologist
- Frank Evans (disambiguation), multiple people
  - Frank Evans (general) (1876–1941), American Marine Corps Brigadier General
  - Frank Evans (actor) (fl. 1908–1927), American silent film actor
  - Frank Evans (rugby) (1897–1972), dual-code rugby player
  - Thomas David Frank Evans (1917–1996), known as Frank Evans, prisoner of war in World War II and author
  - Frank Evans (baseball) (1921–2012), Negro league baseball player
  - Frank Evans (politician) (1923–2010), U.S. Representative from Colorado
  - Frank Evans (bullfighter) (born 1942), British-born bullfighter
- Fred and Frederick Evans (disambiguation), multiple people
  - Fred Evans (union worker) (1881–1912), Australian unionist who died in the Waihi miners' strike of 1912
  - Fred Evans (comedian) (1889–1951), British music hall and silent movie comedian
  - Fred Evans (running back) (1921–2007), American football player for the Chicago Bears
  - Fred Evans (philosopher) (born 1944) American continental philosopher
  - Fred Evans (defensive tackle) (Frederick H. Evans, born 1983), American football player
  - Fred Evans (boxer) (born 1991), Welsh amateur boxer
    - Frederick John Owen Evans (1815–1885), Royal Navy officer and hydrographer
    - Frederick H. Evans (1853–1943), British photographer, primarily of architectural subjects

== G ==
- Gabe Evans, American politician from Colorado
- Garan Evans (born 1973), Welsh rugby union footballer
- Gareth Evans (disambiguation), multiple people
  - Gareth Evans (politician) (born 1944), Australian former politician & former head of the International Crisis Group
  - Gareth Evans (philosopher) (1946–1980), philosopher at Oxford University and student of Michael Dummett
  - Gareth Evans (rugby union, born 1952), Welsh former rugby union player
  - Gareth Evans (footballer, born 1967), English former professional footballer
  - Gareth Evans (director) (born 1980), Welsh film director based in Indonesia
  - Gareth Evans (footballer, born 1981), English former professional footballer
  - Gareth Evans (weightlifter) (born 1986), British weightlifter
  - Gareth Evans (footballer, born 1987), Welsh professional footballer
  - Gareth Evans (footballer, born 1988), English professional footballer
  - Gareth Evans (rugby union, born August 1991), New Zealand rugby union player
  - Gareth Evans (rugby union, born September 1991), English rugby union player
- Gary Evans (serial killer) (1954–1998), American serial killer
- Gary Evans (racing driver) (born 1960), British former racing driver
- Gary Evans (golfer) (born 1969), English golfer
- Gavin Evans (born 1984), Welsh rugby union player
- Gaulbert Evans (born 1965), cricketer for the United States Virgin Islands
- Gene Evans (1922–1988), American actor
- Gene Evans (pyrotechnician) (1937–2008), American pyrotechnician
- Gerard Evans (died 1979), Irishman supposedly executed by the IRA
- Geoff and Geoffrey Evans (disambiguation), multiple people
  - Geoff Evans (cricketer) (born 1939), English cricketer
  - Geoff Evans (rugby union, born 1942), former Wales international rugby union player
  - Geoff Evans (rugby union, born 1950), former England international rugby union player
  - Geoff Evans (political scientist), British political scientist
    - Geoffrey Evans (botanist) (1883–1963), British botanist
    - Geoffrey Charles Evans (1901–1987), British World War II general
    - Geoffrey Evans (c. 1943 – 2012), Irish serial killer
- George Evans (disambiguation), multiple people
  - George Evans (antiquary) (1630?–1702), English antiquary
  - George Evans, 1st Baron Carbery (c. 1680 – 1749), Irish politician
  - George Evans, 4th Baron Carbery (1766–1804), British politician
  - George Evans (explorer) (1780–1852), Australian explorer
  - Sir George De Lacy Evans (1787–1870), British Army general
  - George Evans (American politician) (1797–1867), American congressman
  - George Evans (Australian politician) (1802–1868), politician in Victoria, Australia
  - George Henry Evans (1805–1855), American radical reformer
  - George Hampden Evans (died 1842), Irish politician
  - George S. Evans (1826–1883), Texas Ranger, miner, businessman and political official
  - George Essex Evans (1863–1909), Australian journalist
  - George Evans (footballer, born 1864) (1864–1947), English football player (Manchester United)
  - George "Honey Boy" Evans (1870–1915), American songwriter and entertainer
  - George Evans (VC) (1876–1937), British Army officer
  - George Evans (coach) (1901–1976), American football, basketball, and baseball coach
  - George Evans (bandleader) (died 1993), English jazz bandleader, arranger and tenor saxophonist
  - George Ewart Evans (1909–1988), Welsh-born schoolteacher, writer and folklorist
  - George Evans (cartoonist) (1920–2001), comic book artist
  - George Roche Evans (1922–1985), American Catholic bishop
  - George Evans (footballer, born 1935) (1935–2000), Welsh footballer
  - George Evans (rugby league) (1941–2015), Australian rugby league footballer
  - George Evans (singer) (born 1963), Canadian-American jazz vocalist
  - George Evans (basketball) (born 1971), American basketballer
  - George Evans (footballer, born 1994), English football player (Manchester City, Crewe Alexandra)
- Geraint Evans (1922–1992), Welsh opera singer
- Geri Evans (1940–2018), American politician
- Gil Evans (1912–1988), Canadian jazz musician
- Gillian Evans, British philosopher
- Glen Evans (1936–2016), New Zealand politician
- Godfrey Evans (1920–1999), English cricketer (Kent)
- Graeme Evans (born 1942), Zimbabwean cricket umpire
- Graham Evans (born 1963), British Conservative politician
- Graham Evans (public servant) (born 1943), Australian public servant and policy maker
- Grant Evans (scholar) (1948–2014), Australian anthropologist
- Grant Evans (born 1990), Scottish footballer
- Greg Evans (disambiguation), multiple people
- Greg Evans (cartoonist) (born 1947), American cartoonist
- Greg Evans (television host) (born 1953), Australian television host
- Greg Evans (American football) (born 1971), professional American football player
- Gregory Evans (judge) (1913–2010), Canadian judge
- Gregory Evans (dramatist), British radio and television playwright
- Griffith Evans (politician) (1869–1943), Australian politician
- Griffith Conrad Evans (1887–1973), American mathematician
- Gurney Evans (1907–1987), politician in Manitoba, Canada
- Guy Evans (born 1947), English drummer, percussionist and composer
- Gwyn Evans (rugby union, born 1957) (born 1957), Welsh rugby union player
- Gwyndaf Evans (born 1959), Welsh rally driver
- Gwynfor Evans (1912–2005), Welsh politician
- Gwynn Evans (1915–2001), Welsh cricketer
- Gwynne Evans (1880–1965), American swimmer and water polo player
- Gwynne Owen Evans British criminal hanged for the murder of John Alan West
- Gyan Evans (born c. 1960), Australian singer-songwriter

== H ==
- Harold Evans (footballer) (1889–1973), Australian rules footballer
- Harold Evans (attorney) (1886–1977), American UN-appointed administrator of Jerusalem in 1948
- Harold Evans (1928–2020), British American journalist, former editor of Sunday Times and campaigner
- Harry Evans (disambiguation), multiple people
  - Harry Congreve Evans (1860–1899), South Australian journalist and editor
  - Harry Evans (composer) (1873–1914), Welsh composer
  - Harry Marshall Erskine Evans (1876–1973), Canadian politician and former mayor of Edmonton, Alberta
  - Harry Evans (Australian footballer) (1879–?), Australian rules footballer
  - Harry Evans (football manager), British football coach and former manager of Blackpool F.C. (1928–33)
  - Harry Evans (footballer, born 1919) (1919–1962), English football player and manager
  - Harry Evans (Australian Senate clerk) (1946–2014), Clerk of the Australian Senate
- Heath Evans (born 1978), American football fullback
- Henry Evans (disambiguation), multiple people
  - Henry Evans (theatre) (fl. 1583–1608), Elizabethan theatrical producer
  - Henry Evans (Evanion) (1832–1905), conjurer, ventriloquist and humorist
  - Henry H. Evans (1836–1917), American politician from Illinois
  - Henry Clay Evans (1843–1921), American politician and businessman
  - Henry Evans (English cricketer) (1857–1920), English cricketer
  - Henry R. Evans (1861–1949), American writer and amateur magician
  - Henry Evans (RFC officer) (1879–1916), British aviator and flying ace
  - Henry James Evans (1912–1990), Australian geologist, discoverer of the Weipa bauxite deposits in 1955
- Herbert and Herbie Evans (disambiguation), multiple people
  - Herbert Evans (politician) (1868–1931), British Labour Party Member of Parliament for Gateshead 1931
  - Herbert Evans (actor) (1882–1952), British-born American film actor
  - Herbert McLean Evans (1882–1971), American anatomist and embryologist
    - Herbie Evans (1894–1982), former Welsh footballer
- Heshimu Evans (born 1975), American-born Portuguese basketball player
- Hiram Kinsman Evans (1863–1941), U.S. Representative from Iowa
- Hiram Wesley Evans (1881–1966), Imperial Wizard of the "second" Ku Klux Klan
- Horace Evans, 1st Baron Evans (1903–1963), Welsh physician to the Royal Family
- Howard Evans (journalist) (1839–1915), British Radical and Nonconformist journalist
- Howard Ensign Evans (1919–2002), American entomologist
- Howard Evans (musician) (1944–2006), British trumpeter
- Hugh Evans (footballer) (1919–2010), Welsh footballer active in the 1940s and 1950s
- Hugh Evans (basketball) (1940–2022), American basketball referee active from 1972 to 2001
- Hugh Evans (humanitarian) (born 1983), Australian humanitarian
- Hywel Evans (figure skater) (born 1945), British Olympic figure skater

== I ==
- Iain Evans (born 1960), politician
- Iain Evans (field hockey) (born 1981), South African field hockey player
- Ian Evans (historian) (born 1940), Australian author, publisher and historian
- Ian Evans (footballer) (born 1952), Welsh footballer
- Ian Evans (cricketer) (born 1982), English cricketer
- Ian Evans (rugby union) (born 1984), Welsh rugby union player
- Ianto Evans, Welsh applied ecologist and landscape architect
- Ieuan Evans (born 1964), Welsh international rugby union footballer and British Lion
- Ifan Evans (born 1983), Welsh rugby union footballer
- Ifor Evans, Baron Evans of Hungershall (1899–1982), British academic
- Indiana Evans (born 1990), Australian singer-songwriter and actress
- Ioan Evans (disambiguation), multiple people
- Ira Hobart Evans (1844–1922), American officer in the Union Army, businessman and philanthropist
- Iris Evans (born 1941), Canadian politician in Alberta
- Isaac Newton Evans (1827–1901), American Republican Congressman from Pennsylvania
- Isaiah Evans (born 2005), American basketball player
- Islwyn Evans, Welsh rugby union international
- Ivor Evans (footballer, born 1966), Fijian football midfielder
- Ivor Evans (Australian footballer) (1887–1960), Australian rules footballer
- Ivor Parry Evans (1923–2009), United States Air Force officer
- I. H. N. Evans (Ivor Hugh Norman Evans, 1886–1957), British anthropologist, ethnographer and archaeologist
- Ivor Evans (bishop) (1900–1962), Anglican bishop in South America

== J ==
- Jack Evans (disambiguation), multiple people
  - Jack Evans (rugby, born 1871) (1871–1924), Welsh rugby union and rugby league footballer who played in the 1890s
  - Jack Evans (footballer, born 1889) (1889–1971), Welsh international footballer
  - Jack Evans (footballer, born 1891) (1891–1988), Australian rules footballer for Melbourne
  - Jack Elwyn Evans (1897–1941), Welsh rugby union and rugby league footballer who played in the 1920s
  - Jack Evans (American football) (1905–1980), American football player
  - Jack Evans (footballer, born 1908) (1908–1960), Australian rules footballer
  - Jack Evans (rugby, born 1922), Welsh rugby union, and rugby league footballer who played in the 1940s and 1950s
  - Jack Evans (English rugby league, born 1897), English rugby league footballer who played in the 1920s
  - Jack Wilson Evans (1922–1997), mayor of Dallas, Texas, 1981–1983
  - Jack Evans (ice hockey) (1928–1996), Canadian ice hockey player and coach in the National Hockey League
  - Jack Evans (Australian politician) (1928–2009), Australian Senator
  - Jack Evans (footballer, born 1930), Australian rules footballer for St Kilda
  - Jack Evans (D.C. politician) (born 1953), member of the Council of the District of Columbia
  - Jack Evans (musician) (born 1953), Reverend Zen drummer and composer
  - Jack Evans (born 1982), American professional wrestler
  - Jack Evans (footballer, born 1993), English footballer
- Jacob Evans (born 1997), American baseball player
- Jahri Evans (born 1983), American football player
- Jake Evans (disambiguation), multiple people
  - Jake Evans (baseball) (1856–1907), Major League Baseball right fielder
  - Jake Evans (footballer, born 1998), English footballer
  - Jake Evans (footballer, born 2008), English footballer
  - Jake Evans (ice hockey) (born 1996), Canadian ice hockey player
- James Evans (disambiguation), multiple people
  - James Evans (linguist) (1801–1846), Canadian missionary
  - James G. Evans (1809–1859), American painter
  - James La Fayette Evans (1825–1903), American politician from Indiana
  - James R. Evans (1845–1918), American Civil War soldier and Medal of Honor recipient
  - James Evans (Ontario politician) (1848–1880), Canadian politician
  - James Evans (cricketer) (1891–1973), English cricketer
  - James Evans (Utah politician), Chairman of the Utah Republican Party
  - James Evans (rugby league) (born 1978), Australian rugby league player, Wales international
- Jan Evans (1937–2000), American politician
- Jane Evans (disambiguation), multiple people
  - Jane Evans (activist) (1907–2004), American Jewish activist
  - Jane Evans (artist) (1946–2012), New Zealand artist
- Janet Evans (born 1971), American swimmer
- Janet Evans (revolutionary), British revolutionary
- Jason Evans (disambiguation), multiple people
- Jaxon Evans (born 1996), New Zealand racing driver
- Jean Evans (born 1966), American politician
- Jeff Evans (cricket) (1954–2025), Welsh cricket umpire
- Jeff Evans (born 1960), British writer and journalist
- Jeffrey Richard de Corban Evans (born 1948), British shipbroker and hereditary peer
- Jeffrey Evans, American musician
- Jem Evans (1867–1942), Welsh rugby union international
- Jenni L. Evans (1962–2025), Australian-born American meteorologist and academic
- Jennifer Evans, Welsh actress
- Jeremy Evans (born 1987), American basketball player
- Jerome Evans (football coach) (c. 1930 – 1995), US American football coach
- Jerome Evans (singer) (1938–2003), American singer
- Jerome Albert Evans Jr. (Silkski), American producer and rap artist
- Jerry Evans (born 1968), US American footballer (Denver Broncos)
- Jesse Evans (outlaw) (1853–????), American outlaw
- Jessie Evans (basketball), American college basketball coach
- Jessie Evans (singer), American-born songwriter, singer, saxophonist and record producer in Germany
- Jill Evans (born 1959), Welsh politician
- Jim and Jimmy Evans (disambiguation), multiple people
  - Jim Evans (umpire) (born 1946), baseball umpire
  - Jim Evans (artist) (born 1950), American painter
  - Jim Evans (rugby union) (born 1980), English rugby union player
    - Jimmy Evans (footballer, born 1894) (1894–1975), Welsh international footballer
- Jo Evans, American softball player and coach
- Joan Evans (art historian) (1893–1977), British art historian
- Joan Evans (charity worker) (born 1931), Australian religious sister and charity activist
- Joan Evans (actress) (1934–2023), American film actress
- Joanne Evans, New Zealand footballer
- Jodie Evans (born 1954), American political activist
- Joe Evans (baseball) (1895–1951), American baseball player
- Joe Evans (American football) (born 1999), American football player
- Joe Evans (musician) (1916–2014), American jazz alto saxophonist
- John and Johnny Evans (disambiguation), multiple people
  - John Evans (by 1519–67/69), English politician from Leominster
  - John Evans (bishop) (before 1671–1724), Welsh born bishop of Bangor and bishop of Meath
  - John Evans (Pennsylvania governor) (c. 1678–after 1709), Welsh-born colonial governor of Pennsylvania
  - John Evans (divine) (c. 1680 – 1730), Welsh divine and writer
  - John Evans (pirate) (died c. 1723), Welsh pirate
  - John Evans (actor) (c. 1693 – c. 1734), actor, who confined his performances to Ireland
  - John Evans (1702–1782), Welsh anti-Methodist Anglican priest
  - John Evans (died 1779), Welsh Anglican priest and curate of Portsmouth
  - John Evans (surgeon) (1756–1846), Welsh surgeon and cartographer
  - John Evans (Baptist) (1767–1827), Welsh minister
  - John Evans (topographical writer) (1768 – c. 1812), writer on Wales
  - John Evans (explorer) (1770–1799), Welsh explorer of the Missouri River
  - John Evans (19th-century writer) (died 1832), English writer
  - John Evans (printer) (1774–1828), English printer
  - John Evans (Methodist) (1779–1847), Welsh Methodist of Llwynffortun
  - John Evans (Kent cricketer) (fl. 1820s), English cricketer
  - John Evans or I. D. Ffraid (1814–1875), Welsh poet
  - John Evans (governor) (1814–1897), American politician, governor of Colorado Territory
  - John Evans (British Columbia politician) (1816–1879), Canadian miner and politician in British Columbia
  - John M. Evans (Wisconsin politician) (1820–1903), American physician and politician from Wisconsin
  - John Evans (archaeologist) (1823–1908), English archaeologist and geologist
  - John Newell Evans (1846–1944), Welsh-born Canadian politician from British Columbia
  - John Gwenogvryn Evans (1852–1930), Welsh minister and paleographer
  - John Evans (Australian politician) (1855–1943), Australian politician in Tasmania
  - John William Evans (geologist) (1857–1930), British geologist
  - John Gary Evans (1863–1942), American politician, governor of South Carolina
  - John M. Evans (Montana politician) (1863–1946), American politician from Montana
  - John Evans (Saskatchewan politician) (1867–1958), Welsh-born Canadian politician from Saskatchewan
  - John Edward "Ted" Evans (1868–1942), English footballer with Stoke and Port Vale
  - John Henry Evans (1872–1947), American Mormon educator and writer
  - John Evans (Ogmore MP) (1875–1961), Welsh politician from Ogmore
  - John Cayo Evans (1879–1958), Welsh mathematician and academic
  - John Hart Evans (1881–1959), Welsh rugby union centre
  - John Evans (cricketer, born 1889) (1889–1960), English cricketer
  - John Evans (footballer, born 1900) (1900–????), English footballer for Sheffield United, Walsall and Stoke
  - St John Evans (1905–1956), Anglican cleric in Africa
  - John Wainwright Evans (1909–1999), solar astronomer
  - John Evans (rugby union, born 1911) (1911–1943), Welsh international rugby union hooker
  - John C. Evans (fl. 1930–1965), American football and basketball player and coach
  - John Davies Evans (1925–2011), English archaeologist and academic
  - John Evans (Idaho governor) (1925–2014), American politician, governor of Idaho
  - John Evans (footballer, born 1929) (1929–2004), English footballer with Liverpool
  - John Robert Evans (1929–2015), Canadian pediatrician, academic, businessperson, and civic leader
  - John Rhys Evans (1930–2010), Welsh operatic baritone
  - John Evans, Baron Evans of Parkside (1930–2016), United Kingdom politician
  - John Leslie Evans (born 1941), Canadian politician from Ontario
  - John Evans (footballer, born 1941), footballer for Chester City
  - John Maxwell Evans (born 1942), Canadian judge
  - John D. Evans, American business executive and philanthropist
  - John Evans (special effects), Visual effects artist on 5 James Bond films
  - John Evans (bowls) (1947–2026), English footballer and bowls player
  - John Evan or Evans (born 1948), English musician with Jethro Tull
  - John Evans (canoer) (born 1949), American slalom canoer
  - John Louis Evans (1950–1983), American murderer executed in 1983
  - John Evans (Gaelic football), Irish Gaelic football manager
  - John Paul Evans (born 1954), Canadian ice hockey player
  - John Evans (Gaelic footballer) (born 1955), Irish Gaelic footballer
  - John R. Evans (born 1955), American politician from Pennsylvania
  - John Marshall Evans (born 1948), American ambassador to Armenia
  - J. Michael Evans (born 1954), Canadian technology executive and the President of Alibaba Group
  - John Evans (Box Tops) (born before 1963), American musician with the Box Tops
  - John Bryan Evans (born 1980), Welsh filmmaker
    - Johnny Evans (Canadian football) (before 1902–1930), Canadian football player
    - Johnny Evans (American football) (born 1956), American football player and radio commentator
- Jon Evans (born 1974), Canadian novelist and journalist
- Jonathan Evans (disambiguation), multiple people
  - Jonathan Evans (politician) (born 1950), British lawyer and Conservative Party Member of Parliament
  - Jonathan Evans, Baron Evans of Weardale (born 1958), British; Director-General of MI5
  - Jonathan Evans (American football) (born 1981), US American footballer
  - Jonathan Evans (rugby union) (born 1992), Welsh rugby union player
- Joni Evans (born 1942), American book publisher
- Jonny Evans (born 1988), Northern Irish footballer with Manchester United
- Jordan Evans (disambiguation), multiple people
- Joseph Edward Evans (1855–1938), British astronomer
- Josh Evans (film producer) (born 1971), American film producer
- Josh Evans (defensive lineman) (born 1972), former American football player
- Josh Ryan Evans (1982–2002), American actor
- Josh Evans (defensive back) (born 1991), US American football player
- Joshua Evans (Quaker minister) (1731–1798), Quaker minister from New Jersey
- Joshua Evans Jr. (1777–1846), United States Congressman from Pennsylvania
- Josiah J. Evans (1786–1858), United States Senator from South Carolina
- Josiah Evans (1820–1873), British engineer
- Joyce Evans (photographer) (1929–2019), Australian artist
- Joyce Evans, American news anchor and reporter
- Judi Evans (born 1964), American actress
- Julian Evans (born 1972), British adventurer and charity fund-raiser
- Juliana Evans (born 1989), Malaysian actress
- Justin Evans (born 1977), American soccer player
- Justin Evans (American football) (born 1995), American football player

== K ==
- Kane Evans (born 1992), Australian rugby league footballer, Fijian international
- Karen S. Evans, American bureaucrat
- Kate Williams Evans (1866-1961), suffragette and activist for women's rights
- Kathryn Evans (born 1952), British stage actress
- Kathryn Evans (born 1981), English swimmer
- Kathy Evans (1948–2003), English journalist and women's right activist
- Keenan Evans (born 1996), American basketball player in the Israel Basketball Premier League
- Kelly Evans (born 1985), American journalist
- Kellylee Evans (born 1975), Canadian jazz and soul vocalist
- Kenneth A. Evans (1898–1970), American Republican businessman and politician
- Kenneth Evans (bishop of Ontario) (1903–1970)
- Kenneth Evans (bishop of Dorking) (1915–2007)
- Kenny Evans (born 1979), American high jumper
- Kevin L. Evans (born 1962), French-born American entertainment executive
- Kevin Evans (cricketer) (born 1963), former English cricketer
- Kevin Evans (ice hockey) (born 1965), Canadian ice hockey player
- Kieran Evans (born 1969), Welsh film director and screenwriter
- Kwame Evans Jr. (born 2004), American basketball player

== L ==
- Sir Laming Worthington-Evans, 1st Baronet (1868–1931), British Conservative politician
- Larry Evans, multiple people
- Laura Evans (disambiguation), multiple people
- Lauren Evans (born 1983), American singer and songwriter
- Laurie Evans (politician) (1933–2016), Canadian politician in Manitoba
- Laurie Evans (born 1987), English cricketer
- Lawrence C. Evans (born 1949), American mathematician
- Lawrence Watt-Evans (born 1954), American sci-fi and fantasy author
- Lee Evans (disambiguation), multiple people
  - Lee Evans (athlete) (1947–2021), American sprinter
  - Lee Evans (Australian politician) (born c. 1962), Australian politician
  - Lee Evans (comedian) (born 1964), English comedian and actor
  - Lee Latchford-Evans (born 1975), musician and former member of the band Steps
  - Lee Evans (American football) (born 1981), American football player
  - Lee Evans (footballer) (born 1994), Welsh association football player with Wolverhampton Wanderers
  - Lee G. R. Evans, British birdwatcher
- Leighton Evans, British philosopher
- Len Evans (footballer) (1903–1977), Welsh international football goalkeeper
- Len Evans (wine) (1930–2006), Australian wine columnist
- Leomont Evans (born 1974), American football safety
- Leonard Evans (1929–2016), Canadian politician in Manitoba
- Lewis Evans (disambiguation), multiple people
  - Lewis Evans (controversialist) (fl. 1574), Welsh controversialist
  - Lewis Evans (surveyor) (c. 1700 – 1756), Welsh colonial surveyor and geographer
  - Lewis Evans (mathematician) (1755–1827), Welsh mathematician
  - Lewis Evans (collector) (1853–1930), British businessman and scientific instrument collector
  - Lewis Pugh Evans (1881–1962), British Brigadier General and World War I Victoria Cross recipient
  - Lewis Evans (bishop) (1904–1996), Anglican bishop of Barbados
  - Lewis Evans (rugby union) (born 1987), Welsh rugby union player
- Lila Walter Evans, American politician in Montana
- Lillian Evanti (1890–1967), American opera singer
- Linda Evans (disambiguation), multiple people
  - Linda Evans (born 1942), American actress
  - Linda Evans (U.S. radical) (born 1947), activist
  - Linda Evans (author) (born 1958), American science fiction writer
- Lini Evans, Canadian singer and actress
- Lisa Evans (born 1992), Scottish footballer
- Lisa Evans (playwright) (writing 1986-), British playwright, TV/radio writer
- Lissa Evans (graduated 1983), British television director, producer and author
- Lizzie Evans, American entertainer
- Lizzie P. Evans-Hansell (1836–1922), American writer
- Lloyd Evans (disambiguation), multiple people
- Llŷr Ifans (born 1968), Welsh actor
- Logan Evans (baseball) (born 2001), American baseball player
- Logan Evans (footballer) (born 2005), Australian rules footballer
- Lon Evans (1911–1992), US American footballer (Green Bay Packers)
- Lorenzo Evans (1878–????), footballer in the northwest of England
- Louis E. Atkinson (1841–1910), American physician, attorney and Republican politician
- Lucia Evans (born 1982), Irish–Zimbabwean singer
- Lucy Evans (born 1985), British actress
- Luke Evans (actor) (born 1979), Welsh actor
- Luke Evans (cricketer) (born 1987), English cricketer
- Luke Evans (rugby union) (born 1988), Australian rugby union player
- Luther H. Evans (1902–1981), American political scientist
- Lyn Evans (born 1945), Welsh scientist (CERN)
- Lynne Evans (born 1948), British archer

== M ==
- Mac Evans (1884–1974), Australian cricketer and footballer (soccer)
- Maddy Evans (born 1991), American soccer player
- Madge Evans (1909–1981), American actress
- Mal and Malcolm Evans (disambiguation), multiple people
  - Mal Evans (1935–1976), road manager for 'The Beatles'
  - Malcolm Evans (computer programmer) (born 1944), British computer programmer
  - Malcolm Evans (cartoonist) (born 1945), New Zealand cartoonist
  - Malcolm Evans (jurist) (born 1959), O.B.E., British jurist
- Maldwyn Evans (1937–2009), Welsh bowls player
- Marc Evans (born 1963), Welsh film director
- Marcus Evans (born 1963), a British businessman, owner of Ipswich Town F.C.
- Marcus C. Evans Jr., American congressman from Illinois
- Margaret Evans (journalist), Canadian journalist
- Margaret Evans Price, née Margaret Evans (1888–1973) American children's book illustrator and artist
- Margaret Evans (novelist), pseudonym used by British writer Margaret Potter (1921–1998)
- Margaret Evans (mayor), mayor of Hamilton, New Zealand, 1989–1998
- Margie Evans (1939–2021), American blues and gospel singer and songwriter
- Mari Evans (1919–2017), American poet
- Marjorie Evans (c.1850–1907), Scottish artist
- Mark Evans (disambiguation), multiple people
- Marlon Evans (born 1997), Guamanian footballer
- Marsha J. Evans (born 1947), American Rear Admiral
- Martin Evans (model engineer) (1916–2003), British magazine editor
- Martin Evans (born 1941), British scientist, 2007 Nobel Prize winner in Physiology or Medicine
- Martyn Evans (born 1953), Australian politician
- Martyn Evans (academic), Professor in Humanities in Medicine at the University of Durham
- Mary Evans (1770–1843), English; Samuel Taylor Coleridge's first love
- Mary Anne Evans (1792–1872), wife of Disraeli
- Mary Ann Evans (1819–1880), better known as George Eliot, writer
- Mary Ann Evans (1908–1996), better known as Fearless Nadia, Indian actress and stuntwoman
- Mary Augusta Tappage Evans (1888-1978), Shuswap-Métis elder, midwife, and storyteller
- Mary Beth Evans (born 1961), American actress
- Mary Forbes Evans (1936–2010), British writer and picture librarian
- Mary Evans (artist) (born 1963), British-Nigerian artist
- Mary Evans Wilson (1866–1928), American civil rights activist
- Mathew Evans, Canadian inventor
- Matilda Evans (1872–1935), African–American doctor and health campaigner
- Matilee Loeb-Evans Preston (1879-1963), American composer
- Matt Evans (born 1986), Filipino actor
- Matt Evans (rugby union) (born 1988), Canadian rugby union footballer
- Matthew Evans, Baron Evans of Temple Guiting (1941–2016), British Labour Party politician
- Matthew Rhys (born 1974), stage name used by Welsh actor born Matthew Evans
- Maureen Evans (born 1940), Welsh pop singer
- Maurice Evans (actor) (1901–1989), English actor
- Maurice Evans (footballer, born 1936) (1936–2000), British football player and manager
- Maurice Evans (basketball) (born 1978), American basketball player
- Maurice Evans (American football) (born 1988), American football defensive end
- Max Evans (Australian footballer) (1923–2006), Australian rules footballer
- Max Evans (politician) (1930–2019), Australian politician
- Max Evans (rugby union) (born 1983), Scottish international rugby union player
- Maxine Evans (born 1966), Welsh actress
- Maya Evans (born 1979), British peace campaigner
- Medwyn Evans (born 1964), Welsh footballer
- Melvin H. Evans (1917–1984), Governor of the United States Virgin Islands and ambassador to Trinidad and Tobago
- Meredith Evans, Australian paralympic swimmer
- Meredith Gwynne Evans (1904–1952), British physical chemist
- Merle Evans (1891–1987), American cornet player and circus band conductor
- Micah Evans (born 1993), English footballer
- Michael, Mickey, Micky and Mike Evans (disambiguation), multiple people
  - Michael Evans (actor) (1920–2007), original cast member of Gigi
  - Michael Evans (photographer) (1944–2005), presidential photographer
  - Michael Charles Evans (1951–2011), Roman Catholic bishop of East Anglia, England
  - Michael Evans (rower) (born 1957), Canadian Olympic rower
  - Michael Evans (water polo) (born 1960), American Olympic water polo player
  - Michael Evans (Dutch footballer) (born 1976), Dutch footballer
  - Michael Evans (boxer) (born 1977), American lightweight boxer
  - Michael Evans (Australian footballer) (born 1992), Australian rules footballer
  - Michael H. Evans, CEO and co-founder of The Vines of Mendoza
    - Mickey Evans (Welsh footballer) (born 1947), Welsh footballer
    - Mickey Evans (footballer born 1973), British footballer, played for Plymouth Argyle and Southampton
      - Micky Evans (born 1946), English footballer
        - Mike Ronay Evans (born 1959), American heavyweight boxer
        - Mike Evans (offensive lineman) (born 1946), American football offensive lineman
        - Mike Evans (journalist) (born 1947), American political author
        - Mike Evans (actor) (1949–2006), American actor on The Jeffersons, co-creator of Good Times
        - Mike Evans (basketball) (born 1955), retired NBA player and current coach
        - Mike Evans (wide receiver) (born 1993), American football wide receiver
- Mitch Evans (born 1994), New Zealand racing driver
- Monica Evans (born 1940), English actress
- Monique Evans (born 1956), Brazilian model, actress and TV presenter
- Monique Evans (Miss Texas) (born 1993), American beauty pageant title-holder
- Cowboy Morgan Evans (1903–1969), American rodeo performer
- Morgan "Bill" Evans (1910–2002), American landscape designer
- Morgan Evans (screenwriter), American writer, director and producer
- Moss Evans Welsh trade unionist
- M. Stanton Evans, American political conservative commentator and author

== N ==
- Nancy Evans (disambiguation), multiple people
- Nathan Evans (Ohio politician) (1804–1879), American politician
- Nathan George Evans (1824–1868), American Civil War Confederate general
- Neah Evans (born 1990), Scottish cyclist
- Neal Evans (c. 1888 – 1945), US-born pioneer freightman, entrepreneur cowboy, and miner in British Columbia, Canada
- Neil Evans (footballer) (born 1947), Australian rules footballer from Victoria
- Neil Evans (presenter), Australian Fox Sports television presenter
- Nerys Evans (born 1980), Welsh politician
- Nicholas, Nick and Nicky Evans (disambiguation), multiple people
  - Nicholas Evans (1950–2022), English screenwriter and journalist
  - Nicholas Evans (linguist) (born 1956), Australian linguist specializing in Indigenous Australian languages
    - Nick Evans (trombonist) (born 1947), British jazz trombonist of e.g. The Keith Tippett Group, Soft Machine
    - Nick Evans (cricketer) (born 1954), English cricketer
    - Nick Evans (rugby union) (born 1980), New Zealand rugby union footballer
    - Nick Evans (baseball) (born 1986), American baseball player
      - Nicky Evans (footballer) (born 1958), English footballer
      - Nicky Evans (born 1979), British actor
- Nigel Evans (born 1957), British politician
- Niki Evans (born 1972), English singer
- Noel Evans (footballer) (born 1930), Australian rules footballer
- Noel Evans (cricketer) (1911–1964), English cricketer
- Non Evans (born 1974), Welsh sportswoman
- Noreen Evans (born 1955), American politician in California
- Norm Evans (born 1942), American football offensive tackle
- Norman Evans (1901–1962), English variety and radio performer
- Norman Evans (architect), British architect

== O ==
- Oliver Evans (1755–1819), American inventor and engineer
- Omar Evans (born 1976), American Canadian football defensive back
- Omari Evans (born 2003), American football wide receiver
- Orinda Dale Evans (born 1943), American Federal Judge
- Orrin Evans (born 1976), American jazz pianist
- Orrin C. Evans (1902–1971), African-American journalist and comic book publisher
- Ossie Evans (1916–1986), Welsh footballer
- Owen Evans (disambiguation)

== P ==
- Pam Evans, founder of Peace Mala
- Pamela Evans (born 1949), British author
- Pat Evans (mayor) (born 1943), mayor of Plano, Texas
- Patrice Evans (born 1976), American writer and satirist
- Patrick Evans (disambiguation), multiple people
- Paul Evans (disambiguation), multiple people
  - Paul R. Evans (1931–1987), American furniture designer
  - Paul Evans (musician) (born 1938), American rock and roll singer/songwriter from the 1950s
  - Paul Evans (poet) (1945–1991), British poet
  - Paul F. Evans, American law enforcement officer who served as Commissioner of the Boston Police Department
  - Paul Evans (ice hockey, born 1954), Canadian ice hockey player in the NHL who played for the Philadelphia Flyers
  - Paul Evans (ice hockey, born 1955), Canadian ice hockey player in the NHL who played for the Toronto Maple Leafs
  - Paul Evans (athlete) (born 1961), British Olympic runner
  - Paul Evans (footballer, born 1973), South African football player
  - Paul Evans (footballer, born 1974), Welsh football player
  - Paul Evans (Australian footballer) (born 1978), Port Adelaide AFL footballer
  - Paul Evans (basketball), American college basketball coach
  - Paul Evans (football assistant manager), English football assistant manager and coach and ex goalkeeper
  - Paul Evans (Illinois politician), Republican member of the Illinois House of Representatives
- Peggy Evans (1921–2015), British actress
- Percy Evans (cricketer), British cricketer
- Percy Evans (footballer), Australian rules footballer
- Percy Evans (geologist), British geologist
- Pete Evans (born 1973), Australian chef, author and TV personality
- Peter Evans (disambiguation), multiple people
  - Peter Evans (restaurateur) (1926–2014), British restaurateur
  - Peter Evans (radio personality) (1927–1985), 3LO breakfast announcer 1965–1986
  - Peter Evans (musicologist) (1929–2018), British musicologist, author of The Music of Benjamin Britten
  - Peter B. Evans (born 1944), political sociologist
  - Peter Evans (swimmer) (born 1961), Australian swimmer, won a gold medal at the 1980 Summer Olympics
  - Peter Evans (musician), American musician, specializes in improvisation and avant-garde music
- Phil Evans (Australian footballer) (born 1950), Australian rules footballer
- Phil Evans (footballer, born 1980) (born 1980), South African football (soccer) player
- Philip Evans (1645–1679), Welsh Roman Catholic priest and saint
- Philip Evans (headmaster) (born 1948), British educationalist and headmaster
- Philip Evans (cricketer) (born 1982), English cricketer
- Phillip Evans (baseball) (born 1992), American baseball player
- Pippa Evans, British comedian
- Polly Evans, British TV presenter

== R ==
- Rachel Held Evans (1981–2019), American columnist and author
- Ralph Evans (disambiguation), multiple people
  - Ralph Evans (cricketer) (1891–1929), English first-class cricketer
  - Ralph Evans (footballer) (1915–1996), English forward in the Football League
  - Ralph Evans (sailor) (1924–2000), American sailor and Olympic medalist
  - Ralph Evans (boxer) (born 1953), British Olympic bronze medalist
  - Ralph Evans (violinist) (born 1953), American violinist in the Fine Arts Quartet
- Randall Evans (born 1991), hb football cornerback
- Randy Evans (born 1958), American Republican lawyer
- Raphale Evans (born 1990), English footballer
- Rashaan Evans (born 1996), American football player
- Rashad Evans (born 1979), American mixed martial arts fighter
- Ray and Raymond Evans (disambiguation), multiple people
  - Ray Evans (1915–2007), American songwriter
  - Ray Evans (halfback) (1922–1999), American football halfback
  - Ray Evans (Australian businessman) (1939–2014), Australian campaigner against climate change mitigation efforts
  - Ray Evans (cartoonist) (1887–1954), American editorial cartoonist
  - Ray Evans (footballer, born 1949) (born 1949), retired English footballer
  - Ray Evans (rugby league), rugby league footballer who played in the 1950s
    - Raymond Evans (USCG) (c. 1922 – 2013), United States Coast Guard sailor
    - Raymond Evans (field hockey) (1939–1974), Australian field hockey player
- Reanne Evans (born 1985), English snooker player
- Rebecca Evans (politician) (born 1976), Welsh politician
- Rebecca Evans (singer), Welsh soprano
- Red Evans (1906–1982), American baseball pitcher
- Redd Evans (1912–1972), American lyricist
- Reg Evans (1928–2009), British actor
- Reggie Evans (American football) (born 1959), US American footballer
- Reggie Evans (born 1980), American basketball player
- Reginald Evans (born 1939), footballer for Newcastle United
- Rheece Evans (born 1990), South African footballer
- Rhodri Evans (born 1989), Welsh cricketer
- Rhys Evans (born 1982), English footballer
- Rhys Evans (rugby league) (born 1992), Welsh rugby league footballer
- Rhys Ifans (born 1967), Welsh actor
- Ric Evans (born 1942), Australian cricket umpire
- Richard, Richie and Ricky Evans (disambiguation), multiple people
  - Richard Evans (1778-1864), British colliery owner
  - Richard Evans (portrait painter) (1784–1871), English portrait-painter and copyist
  - Richard Evans (1811-1887), son of Richard Evans (1778–1864)
  - R. C. Evans (1861–1921), Canadian leader in the Reorganized Church of Jesus Christ of Latter Day Saints
  - Richard Thomas Evans (1890–1946), British Liberal Party politician
  - Richard L. Evans (1906–1971), American leader in The Church of Jesus Christ of Latter-day Saints and radio announcer
  - Sir Richard Evans (British diplomat) (1928–2012), British diplomat
  - Richard Evans (actor) (1935–2021), American actor
  - Richard Bunger Evans (born 1942), American composer
  - Richard Evans (businessman) (born 1942), English business executive, known as Dick Evans
  - Richard Evans (designer) (born 1945), English creative artist for record album covers
  - Richard J. Evans (born 1947), English historian specialising in Germany before and during World War II
  - Richard Evans (rugby league), rugby league footballer who played in the 1970s
  - Richard Evans (Australian politician) (born 1953), Australian Liberal Party politician
  - Richard Evans (radio presenter) (born 1958), British radio presenter
  - Richard Paul Evans (born 1962), American author of books with Christian themes
  - Richard Evans (footballer, born 1968), Welsh footballer
  - Richard Evans (AI researcher) (born 1969), computer game developer
  - Richard Evans (footballer, born 1983), Welsh football midfielder
  - Richard Evans (Canadian composer), Canadian television score and new age composer
    - Richie Evans (1941–1985), American racecar driver in NASCAR
      - Ricky Evans (rugby union) (born 1960), Welsh rugby union international
      - Ricky Evans (darts player) (born 1990), English darts player
- Rob and Robert Evans (disambiguation), multiple people
  - Rob Evans (basketball) (born 1946), American college basketball coach
  - Rob Evans (Christian musician) (born 1953), children's singer-songwriter known as the Donut Man
  - Rob Evans (rugby union) (born 1992), Welsh rugby union player
  - Rob Evans (writer) (born 1978), playwright
    - Robert Harding Evans (1778–1857), bookseller and auctioneer
    - Robert Morgan Evans (1783–1844), American politician in Indiana
    - Robert Evans (Archdeacon of Westmorland) (1789–1866), English Anglican archdeacon and author
    - Robert Evans (Archdeacon of Cloyne) (1808–1889), Irish Anglican archdeacon
    - Robert Anderson Evans (died 1901), English executioner, 1873–1875
    - Robert K. Evans (1852–1926), United States Army officer
    - Robert E. Evans (1856–1925), Nebraska Republican politician
    - Robert Evans (footballer, born 1885) (1885–1965), footballer who played for Sheffield United
    - Robert Evans (racing driver) (1889-?), American racecar driver
    - Robert B. Evans (1906–1998), industrialist, socialite, sportsman, and Chairman of AMC
    - Robert Evans (1930–2019), film producer
    - Robert Evans (astronomer) (1937–2022), amateur supernovae astronomer
    - Robert John Weston Evans (born 1943), professor of modern history
    - Robert C. Evans (born 1947), American prelate of the Roman Catholic Church
    - Robert Evans (London politician) (born 1956), Member of the European Parliament for the Labour and Co-operative Parties
    - Robert Evans (writer) (born 1977), playwright and actor
    - Robert Evans (wrestler) (born 1983), Canadian professional wrestler
    - Robert De Friese Evans American Paralympic athlete
- Robin Evans (1944–1993), British architect and historian
- Robley D. Evans (admiral) (1846–1912), American naval fleet commander from 1907 to 1908, known as "Fighting Bob"
- Robley D. Evans (physicist) (1907–1995), American nuclear physicist
- Rod Evans (born 1947), English singer (Deep Purple)
- Rod L. Evans, American philosopher and author
- Roddy Evans (1934–2016), Welsh rugby union international and British Lion
- Roderick Evans (born 1946), judge of the High Court of England and Wales
- Rodney J. Evans (1948–1969), American Medal of Honour recipient
- Roger Evans (disambiguation), multiple people
- Ron Evans (1939–2007), Australian rules footballer from Melbourne
- Ronald Evans (astronaut) (1933–1990), NASA astronaut and one of only 24 people to have flown to the Moon
- Ronald Evans (rugby league) (1933–2010), rugby league footballer who played in the 1950s and 1960s
- Ronald M. Evans (born 1949), American professor and biologist
- Ros Evans (née Coats, 1950–2024), British athlete
- Rosser Evans (George Rosser Evans, 1867–?), Wales international rugby union player
- Rowland Evans (1921–2001), American journalist
- Roy Evans (disambiguation), multiple people
  - Roy Evans (baseball) (1874–1915), baseball pitcher from 1897 to 1903
  - Roy Evans (Australian footballer) (1913–1987), Australian rules footballer for Footscray
  - Roy Evans (actor) (born 1930), British actor
  - Roy Evans (rugby league), rugby league footballer who played in the 1950s, and 1960s
  - Roy Evans (footballer, born 1943) (1943–1969), Welsh international footballer who died in a car crash in 1969
  - Roy Evans (born 1948), English footballer and manager
  - Roy Evans (professor), Welsh civil engineer and professor
- Royston Evans, British footballer in the late 1950s and early '60s
- Ruby Evans (born 2007), Welsh artistic gymnast
- Rupert Evans (cricketer) (born 1954), Jamaican born English cricketer
- Rupert Evans (born 1977), English actor
- Russell Evans (cricketer) (born 1965), English cricketer and umpire
- Ryan Evans (born 1990), American basketball player
- Ryker Evans (born 2001), Canadian ice hockey player

== S ==
- Sam Evans (Big Brother), a Big Brother 14 contestant from Llanelli, born with 70–80% hearing loss
- Samuel B. Evans (1812–1836), Alamo defender
- Samuel Evans (VC) (c. 1821 – 1901), Scottish recipient of the Victoria Cross
- Samuel Thomas Evans (1859–1918), Welsh politician
- Sandy Evans, Australian jazz composer and saxophonist
- Sara M. Evans (born 1943), American historian academic
- Sara Evans (born 1971), American country music singer
- Sarah Lindsay Evans (1816–1898), Australian temperance activist
- Satyananda Stokes (1882–1946), American-born Indian; apple grower and freedom fighter
- Scott Evans (disambiguation), multiple people
  - Scott Evans (politician) (born 1965), Democratic politician and former mayor of Atlantic City, New Jersey
  - Scott Evans (lacrosse) (born 1981), Canadian lacrosse player
  - Scott Evans (actor) (born 1983), American actor
  - Scott Evans (Canadian football) (born 1983), Canadian football player
  - Scott Evans (badminton) (born 1987), Irish badminton player
- Seán Evan (born 1948), Irish Gaelic footballer
- Sebastian Evans (1830–1909), English journalist and political activist
- Seiriol Evans (1894–1984), Anglican dean and author
- Serena Evans (born 1959), British actress
- Shakiem Evans, American actor
- Shane Evans (born 1970), American musician
- Shaquelle Evans (born 1991), American football wide receiver
- Shaun Evans (born 1980), British actor
- Shawn Evans (ice hockey) (born 1965), Canadian ice hockey player and head coach
- Shawn Evans (lacrosse) (born 1986), Canadian lacrosse player
- Sian Evans (born 1971), Welsh singer-songwriter
- Sidney Evans (disambiguation), multiple people
- Simon Evans (writer) (1895–1940), Welsh writer
- Simon Evans (comedian) (born 1965), English comedian
- Simon Evans (racing driver) (born 1990), New Zealand racing driver
- Slayton A. Evans Jr. (1943–2001), American chemist
- Slim Evans (1890–1944), Canadian trade unionist leader in Canada and the US
- Sophie Evans (actress) (born 1976), Hungarian pornographic actress
- Sophie Evans (performer) (born 1993), Welsh singer and talent show contestant
- Sophie Evans (magician), English magician
- Sonia (singer) (born 1971), English pop singer
- Spencer Evans, Welsh footballer in the 1930s
- Stacey Evans, American politician in Georgia
- Stan Evans (born 1930), Australian politician
- Stanley Evans (1898–1970), British Labour politician
- Stanley Evans (writer) (born 1931), English-born Canadian writer
- Stephen Evans (disambiguation), multiple people
  - Stephen R. Evans, Malaysian politician, public administrator and author from Borneo
  - C. Stephen Evans (born 1948), American historian and philosopher
  - Stephen Evans (diplomat) (born 1950), British High Commissioner to Bangladesh
  - Stephen Evans (journalist), BBC correspondent in Berlin and Seoul
  - Stephen Evans (rower) (born 1962), who represented Australia at the 1984 Summer Olympics
  - Stephen Evans (actor) (born 1970), British actor and writer
  - Stephen Evans (footballer) (born 1980), Welsh footballer with Llanelli
    - Steve Evans (baseball) (1885–1943), Major League Baseball player
    - Steve Evans (rugby league), English rugby league footballer
    - Steve Evans (footballer, born 1962), Scottish football manager with Rotherham United
    - Steve Evans (writer) (born 1963), American journalist and film historian
    - Steve Evans (darts player) (born 1972), Welsh darts player
    - Steve Evans (field hockey) (born 1976), South African Olympic field hockey player
    - Steve Evans (footballer, born 1979), Welsh international footballer
      - Steven Evans (soccer) (born 1991), American soccer player
      - Steven Neil Evans (born 12 August 1960), Australian-American statistician and mathematician
- Stewart Evans (ice hockey) (1908–1996), Canadian ice-hockey player
- Stewart Evans (born 1960), English footballer
- Stuart Evans (author) (1934–1994), Welsh author and poet
- Stuart Evans (born 1963), Welsh rugby union international and rugby league footballer
- Sue Evans (born 1951), American musician
- Suellen Evans (1944–1965), American murder victim
- Susan E. Evans, British paleontologist and herpetologist
- Suzanne Evans (born 1965), English UKIP politician

== T ==
- T. Cooper Evans (Thomas Cooper Evans, 1924–2005), U.S. Congressman from Iowa
- Tania Evans (born 1967), British singer-songwriter
- Tavonia Evans, African-American author, businesswoman, cryptocurrency expert, and educator
- Ted Evans (footballer) (1868–1942), English footballer
- Ted Evans (public servant) (1941–2020), Australian public servant
- Tenniel Evans (1926–2009), British actor
- Terence, Terrence and Terry Evans (disambiguation), multiple people
  - Terence T. Evans, judge on the United States Court of Appeals for the Seventh Circuit
    - Terrence Evans (1934–2015), American actor
      - Terry Evans (wrestler) (1911–1999), Canadian freestyle sport wrestler
      - Terry Evans (musician) (1937–2018), American R&B, blues, and soul singer, guitarist and songwriter
      - Terry Evans (footballer, born 1965), English professional footballer
      - Terry Evans (footballer, born 1976), Welsh professional footballer
      - Terry Evans (baseball) (born 1982), American baseball outfielder
- Tesni Evans (born 1992), Welsh squash player
- Thom and Thomas Evans (disambiguation), multiple people
  - Thom Evans (born 1985), Scottish rugby union footballer
    - Thomas Evans (17th-century poet) (died 1633), English poet
    - Thomas Evans (bookseller) (1739–1803), Welsh bookseller
    - Thomas Evans (congressman) (c. 1755 – 1815), American politician, U.S. Congressman from Virginia
    - Thomas Simpson Evans (1777–1818), English mathematician
    - Thomas Evans (Archdeacon of Worcester) (fl. 1787–1817), Anglican priest
    - Thomas W. Evans (1823–1897), American dentist
    - Thomas Evans (poet, died 1833) (1766–1833), Welsh poet
    - Thomas Evans (British Army officer) (1776–1863), British-Canadian Army General
    - Thomas William Evans (1821–1892), High Sheriff of Derbyshire and MP
    - Thomas Evans (Medal of Honor) (1824–1866), recipient of the Congressional Medal of Honor
    - Thomas Evans (poet, 1840–65) (1840–1865), Welsh poet
    - Thomas Evans (Wisconsin politician) (1848–1919), Wisconsin State Assemblyman
    - Thomas Evans (cricketer) (1852–1916), English cricketer
    - Thomas Mellon Evans (1910–1997), American financier
    - Thomas Evans (Archdeacon of Carmarthen) (1914–1982), Anglican priest
    - Thomas B. Evans Jr. (born 1931), former U.S. Congressman from Delaware
    - Thomas Saunders Evans, was an eminent British scholar of and translator into Latin and Ancient Greek, born on 8 March 1816
- Tiffany Evans (born 1992), American singer and actress
- Tim and Timothy Evans (disambiguation), multiple people
  - Tim Evans (footballer) (born 1953), Australian rules footballer
  - Tim Evans (British Army officer) (born 1962)
    - Timothy Evans (1924–1950), Welshman hanged for murders he did not commit
    - Timothy C. Evans (born 1943), American judge
- Tolchard Evans (1901–1978), English songwriter and bandleader
- Tom and Tommy Evans (disambiguation), multiple people
  - Tom Evans (rugby union) (1882–1955), Welsh international rugby player
  - Tom Evans (footballer, born 1896) (1896–after 1926), English-born football wing half
  - Tom Evans (footballer, born 1907) (1907–1993), Welsh footballer for Tottenham Hotspur
  - Tom Evans (Australian politician) (1917–2009), member of the Victorian Legislative Assembly
  - Tom Evans (musician) (1947–1983), English musician and songwriter, member of the band Badfinger
  - Tom Evans (baseball) (born 1974), major league baseball player
  - Tom Evans (footballer, born 1976) (born 1976), English-born Northern Ireland footballer
- Tony Evans (disambiguation), multiple people
  - Tony Evans (footballer, born 1954), English footballer for Cardiff City and Birmingham City
  - Tony Evans (footballer, born 1960), English footballer for Colchester United
  - Tony Evans (Australian footballer born 1966), Australian rules footballer with St Kilda and Footscray
  - Tony Evans (Australian footballer born 1969), Australian rules footballer with the West Coast Eagles
  - Tony Evans (New Zealand footballer), New Zealand international football (soccer) player
  - Tony Evans (radio), Christian pastor and a radio broadcaster
- Trefor Evans (rugby union) (born 1947), Welsh rugby union international
- Trevor Evans (disambiguation), multiple people
- Troy Evans (actor) (born 1948), American actor
- Troy Evans (American football) (born 1977) American football linebacker
- Tudor Evans, British politician
- Tyreke Evans, American basketball player

== V ==
- Venida Evans (born 1947), American actress
- Vernon W. Evans (1895–1975), American politician
- Vernon Lee Evans (born 1949), American murderer
- Victor Evans (1912–1975), English cricketer
- Vin Evans (1935–2013), English cricketer
- Vince Evans (born 1955), American football quarterback
- Vincent Evans (1915–2007), British diplomat and international lawyer
- Vincent Evans (artist) (1896–1976), Welsh artist
- Virginia Evans (born 1986), American novelist
- Virginia Bargar Evans (1894–1983), American painter, glass designer, teacher
- Vyvyan Evans, Welsh linguistics academic

== W ==
- Walker Evans (1903–1975), American photographer
- Walker Evans (racing driver) (1938–2025), American off-road racing driver
- Walter Evans (disambiguation), multiple people
  - Walter Evans (American politician) (1842–1943), United States Representative from Kentucky
  - Walter Jenkin Evans (1856–1927), Welsh Presbyterian academic and writer
  - Walter Rice Evans (1863–1909), Welsh rugby union player
  - Walter Evans (footballer, born 1867) (1867–1897), Aston Villa F.C. and Wales international footballer
  - Sir Walter Evans, 1st Baronet (1872–1954), English hydraulic engineer, politician and public servant
  - Walter Allan Evans (1897–1955), Western Australian cricketer and footballer
  - Walter R. Evans (1920–1999), an American control theorist
- Warren Evans (born 1948), American politician
- Wayne Evans (disambiguation), multiple people
- Wesley G. Evans (1844-1921), American politician
- Wilbur Evans (1905–1987), American musical actor on Broadway, also in films and TV
- Will, William and Willie Evans (disambiguation), multiple people
  - Will Evans (footballer) (born 1991), English footballer
  - Will Evans (rugby union) (born 1997), English rugby union flanker
    - William Evans (divine) (died c. 1720), Welsh Presbyterian divine
    - William Evans (British Army officer), British Army officer during the War of Spanish Succession
    - William Evans (lexicographer) (died 1776), Welsh minister and lexicographer
    - William David Evans (1767–1821), lawyer
    - William Evans (1788–1856), British MP for North Derbyshire
    - William Davies Evans (1790–1872), Welsh chess player
    - William Evans (watercolourist) (1798–1877), William Evans of Eton, English artist
    - William Evans (priest) (1801–1869), divine and naturalist
    - William Evans (landscape painter) (1811–1858), William Evans of Bristol, English artist
    - William Frederick Evans, British entomologist
    - Sir William Evans, 1st Baronet (1821–1892), British Liberal politician and benefactor
    - William Henry Evans (1842–????), Wisconsin legislator
    - W. Leonard Evans Jr. (c.1914–1963), American businessman
    - William T. Evans (1843–1918), American art collector
    - William Evans (judge) (1846/7–1918), Welsh judge and legal author
    - William Evans (Medal of Honor) (1851–1881), American Indian Wars soldier
    - William D. Evans (1852–1963), jurist in the state of Iowa
    - William Evans (footballer) (1853–1919), Wales international footballer
    - William Gray Evans (1855–1911), president of the Denver Tramway Company
    - William Evans (Australian politician) (1856–1914), Australian union leader and politician
    - William Sanford Evans (1869–1950), Manitoba politician
    - W. H. Evans (1876–1956), lepidopterist
    - William Evans (Australian sportsman) (1876–1964), Queensland cricketer and rugby union player
    - William E. Evans (politician) (1877–1959), U.S. Congressman from California
    - William Evans (English cricketer) (1883–1913), South African-born English all-round cricketer
    - William Evans (rugby, born 1883) (1883–1946), Welsh international rugby player
    - William Evans (Wil Ifan) (1883–1968), Welsh poet and Archdruid
    - William Evans (cardiologist) (1895–1988), Welsh cardiologist and publisher
    - William W. Evans (c. 1908 – 1963), American lacrosse player
    - William Evans (1920–2013), American musician a.k.a. Yusef Lateef
    - William J. Evans (general) (1924–2000), U.S. general
    - William Evans (basketball) (1932–2020), Olympic basketball player
    - William E. Evans (pharmacist), American pharmacist and researcher
      - Willie Evans (footballer, born 1912) (1912–1976), Welsh footballer
      - Willie Evans (running back) (1937–2017), American footballer
      - Willie Evans (footballer, born 1939), Ghanaian footballer
      - Willie Evans (defensive end) (born 1984), American footballer
- Winifred Evans (fl. 1921), British actress
- Winsome Evans (born 1941), Australian composer, arranger and harpsichordist
- Woody Evans (born 1977), American writer
- Wyn Evans (born 1947), British Anglican bishop
- Wyndham Evans (born 1951), Welsh football player and manager
- Wynne Evans (born 1972), Welsh tenor

== Z ==
- Zac Evans (born 1991), Welsh footballer
- Zach Evans (born 2001), American football player
- Zack Evans (born 1990), Canadian football player from Saskatchewan

== Fictional characters ==
- Ben Evans (Sunset Beach), a fictional character in the US soap opera Sunset Beach
- Colin Evans, a fictional antagonist character in the 2014 film No Good Deed
- Dana Evans, fictional doctor in the American medical drama TV series The Pitt
- Derek Evans (Sunset Beach), a fictional character on the American soap opera Sunset Beach
- Greg Evans (One Life to Live), a fictional character on the American soap opera One Life to Live
- Isabel Evans, character in the Roswell TV series; twin sister to Max Evans
- James Evans Sr. and J.J. Evans, fictional characters on the American television series Good Times
- Jason Evans, a character in the 2004 American science fiction disaster movie The Day After Tomorrow
- Joanna Evans née Hartman, fictional character from Australian soap opera Neighbours
- Katrina Evans, fictional character from British soap opera Brookside
- Lily Evans, a fictional character in the Harry Potter series; the mother of Harry Potter
- Marlena Evans, character on the NBC soap opera Days of Our Lives
- Max Evans, lead male character in the Roswell TV series; twin brother to Isabel Evans
- Michael Evans (Good Times), a fictional character on the sitcom Good Times
- Miranda Evans, a fictional character on the BBC soap opera Doctors
- Relatives of Harry Potter discusses the family of Lily Potter, née Evans
- Roger Evans, fictional character on the sitcom Sister, Sister
- Roy Evans (Neighbours), fictional character on the Australian soap opera Neighbours
- Ryan Evans, character in High School Musical and its sequels; twin brother of Sharpay Evans
- Sam Evans, character on the series Glee
- Sharpay Evans, character in High School Musical, its sequels, and a spin-off film
- Shaun Evans (One Life to Live), a fictional character on the ABC soap opera One Life to Live
- Soul Eater Evans, character in manga series Soul Eater
- Trevor Evans, a fictional character in children's television series Fireman Sam

=== EastEnders ===
- Barry Evans (EastEnders)
- Derek Evans (EastEnders)
- Jack Evans (EastEnders)
- Janine Evans
- Natalie Evans
- Pat Evans
- Roy Evans (EastEnders)

== See also ==
- Baron Carbery (Evans family), Irish Peerage created in 1715
- Evans (baseball), baseball player
- The Andrew Evans case of wrongful conviction in the United Kingdom
- Bill Evans (album), a 1990 album by Paul Motian
- Bob Evans Restaurants, a chain of American restaurants
- Chukwudi Onuamadike, a Nigerian generally known as Evans
- Earnest Evans, video game for the Sega Genesis and Sega CD
- USS Frank E. Evans (DD-754), an Allen M. Sumner class destroyer
- USCGC Raymond Evans (WPC–1110), a Sentinel class cutter
- Sean Boog (born 1980), Sean Wayne Evans, American rapper
- Zager and Evans, American rock-pop duo of the late 1960s and early '70s
