= Roy Evans (disambiguation) =

Roy Evans (born 1948) is an English football player and manager (Liverpool FC).

Roy Evans may also refer to:

== People ==
- Roy Evans (actor) (born 1930), British actor
- Roy Evans (Australian footballer) (1913–1987), Australian rules footballer for Footscray
- Roy Evans (baseball) (1874–1915), American baseball pitcher from 1897 to 1903
- Roy Evans (engineer), Welsh civil engineer and academic
- Roy Evans (footballer, born 1943) (1943–1969), Welsh international soccer player who died in a car crash in 1969
- Roy Evans (rugby league), British rugby league footballer of the 1950s and 1960s for Great Britain, and Wigan
- Roy Evans (table tennis) (1909–1998), Welsh table tennis player and official
- Roy Evans (trade unionist) (1931–2015), Welsh trade union leader

== Fictional characters ==
- Roy Evans (EastEnders), fictional character on the BBC's EastEnders
- Roy Evans (Neighbours), fictional character on the Australian soap opera Neighbours
