= Reginald Evans (disambiguation) =

Reginald Evans may refer to:

- Reggie Evans (American football) (born 1959), American football player
- Reggie Evans (born 1980), American basketball player
- Reg Evans (1928–2009), British-born Australian actor
- Reginald Evans (born 1939), English football (soccer) player
- Arthur Reginald Evans (1905-1989), Australian coastwatcher who helped save John F. Kennedy after the sinking of PT-109
