= Donald Evans (disambiguation) =

Donald Evans (born 1946) is 34th United States Secretary of Commerce.

Donald Evans may also refer to:

- Don Evans (Donald Thomas Evans, 1938–2003), playwright, educator
- Donald Evans (artist) (1945–1977), American artist
- Donald Evans (American poet) (1884–1921), American poet, publisher, music critic and journalist
- Donald Evans (Welsh poet) (born 1940), Welsh poet, who writes in the Welsh language
- Donald Evans (American football) (born 1964), former American football defensive end
- Donald Randell Evans (1912–1975), Royal Air Force air chief marshal
- Donald W. Evans Jr. (1943–1967), American soldier and Medal of Honor recipient
- Donald Leroy Evans (1957–1999), American serial killer
- Donald Evans, birth name of Ean Evans (1960–2009), American musician
- Donald D. Evans (1927–2018), Canadian educator, psychotherapist and spiritual counsellor
