= Takashi Hiraide =

Japanese poet and critic (born 1950)

Takashi Hiraide (平出 隆, Hiraide Takashi; born 21 November 1950 in moji, now a part of Kitakyūshū, Fukuoka) is a Japanese poet, critic, book designer, and professor. Hiraide's most celebrated work, published in English, is The Guest Cat (2014). The Guest Cat made the New York Times best-seller list in the same year it was published in English, 2014 and has reached international acclaim.

== Career ==
=== Education ===
Takashi Hiraide graduated from Hitotsubashi University in the 1970s and shortly after published his first collection of Poems, "The Inn" (1976) while working as an editor at Kawadeshobishinsha, a publishing house in Tokyo. In 1985, Hiraide spent three months at the University of Iowa's International Writing Program, as poet in residence. During that time, he began writing postcards, addressed to the artist, Donald Evans. In 1990, Hiraide began teaching at Tama Art University, as a professor in poetics. From 1998 to 1999 Hiraide was a visiting scholar at the Berlin Free University, his time there became the basis of a book later published in 2002.

=== Exhibits ===
Hiraide's poetry and book design has led him to be a guest at several literary events, some of which were international:

1. "Shedding Light on Art in Japan, 1953" was on display at the Meguro Museum of Art, Tokyo between June 8–July 21, 1996.
2. "Airpost Poetry - Book Design for One by One" featured at the 2016 International Festival of Authors at Harbourfront Centre, sponsored by Japan Foundation in Toronto, Canada.
3. In August 2017, Hiraide was a resident at the Guest Studio of Vestfossen Kunstlaboratorium, an art studio in Vestfossen, Norway.
4. An exhibition at the Kawamura Memorial DIC Museum of Art from October 2018 to January 2019, entitled: "Language and Art - Takashi Hiraide & the Artists".
5. Hiraide was also a speaker during the 8th "Land and Power" Symposium "BEING ALIVE: What does it mean to live? From the perspective of artistic anthropology" at the Institute for Anthropology Art and Design, Tama Art University, held 19 October 2020.

== Critical reception ==
Japanese author, Kenzaburo Oe, has praised Hiraide's works as "an experiment that gives birth to a new kind of prose from within poetry". His works available in English translation include, Postcards to Donald Evans (2003), For the Fighting Spirit of the Walnut (2008) and The Guest Cat (2014). Both, For the Fighting Spirit of the Walnut (2008) and The Guest Cat (2014), were published by New Directions. Postcards to Donald Evans (2003) was an initial publication of the Tibor de Nagy Foundation. The book was the subject matter for a 2005 article published in the Literature & Aesthetics, a Sydney Open Journal, and a publication of the University of Sydney. Postcards to Donald Evans is also featured as a part of a perpetual online exhibit on tumblr, ⌥ + ␣ + esc [sic].

== Literary honors ==
- 1982: The original Japanese publication of For the Fighting of the Walnut was awarded the Minister of Education Prize for the New Writer.
- 1993: The original Japanese publication of Notes for My Left-hand Diary, won the Yomiuri Literary Award.
- 2001: The original Japanese publication of The Guest Cat won the Kiyama Shohei Literary Award (Japanese: 木山捷平文学賞, Kiyama Shōhei Bungakushō , also known as the Kiyama Prize).
- 2002: The Berlin Moment [sic], awarded The Travel Writing Award.
- 2009: For the Fighting Spirit of the Walnut won Best Translated Book Award for Poetry.
- 2014: New York Times Bestseller List named translated work, The Guest Cat.
