= Brian Evans =

Brian Evans may refer to:

== Sportsmen ==
- Brian Evans (basketball) (born 1973), American former basketball player
- Brian Evans (Glamorgan cricketer) (1936–2011), Glamorgan and Lincolnshire cricketer
- Brian Evans (Hertfordshire cricketer) (born 1964), Hertfordshire cricketer
- Brian Evans (footballer) (1940–2003), Welsh footballer
- Brian Evans (rugby union), New Zealand rugby union coach

== Others ==
- Brian Evans (politician) (born 1950), Canadian lawyer and former provincial level politician from Alberta, Canada
- Brian S. Evans, American politician from Arkansas
- Brian Evans (RAF officer) (1921–1944), Royal Air Force bomber pilot
