= Scott Evans =

Scott Evans may refer to:

- Scott Evans (actor) (born 1983), American actor
- Scott Evans (American football) (born 1968), American football player
- Scott Evans (badminton) (born 1987), Irish badminton player
- Scott Evans (Canadian football) (born 1983), Canadian football player
- Scott Evans (lacrosse) (born 1981), Canadian lacrosse player
- Scott K. Evans (born 1965), American politician and former mayor of Atlantic City, New Jersey
- Scott Evans (host) (born 1986), American television personality, Access Hollywood correspondent
- Scott Evans (Arrowverse), a character from The Flash

== See also ==
- De Scott Evans (1847–1898), American artist
- List of people with surname Evans
