= Benjamin Evans =

Benjamin or Ben Evans may refer to:

- Benjamin F. Evans Jr. (1912–1991), US Army major general
- Benjamin Evans (Baptist minister) (1844–1900), Welsh clergyman and Secretary of the Baptist Missionary Society
- Ifor Evans, Baron Evans of Hungershall (Benjamin Ifor Evans, 1899–1982), British academic
- Benjamin Evans (minister) (1740–1821), Welsh congregational minister
- Ben Evans (rugby union) (born 1975), former international Wales rugby union player
- Ben Evans (rugby league) (born 1992), Welsh rugby league footballer
- Ben Evans (Sunset Beach), a character in the American soap opera Sunset Beach
- Ben Evans (golfer) (born 1986), English golfer
- Ben Evans (designer) (born 1963), British designer and design historian
