= Michael Evans =

Michael, Mickey, or Mike Evans may refer to:

== Sports ==
=== American football ===
- Mike Evans (offensive lineman) (born 1946), American football offensive lineman
- Mike Evans (defensive lineman) (born 1967), American football defensive lineman
- Mike Evans (wide receiver) (born 1993), American football wide receiver

=== Association football ===
- Michael Evans (Dutch footballer) (born 1976), Dutch footballer
- Micky Evans (born 1946), English footballer
- Mickey Evans (footballer, born 1947), Welsh footballer
- Mickey Evans (footballer, born 1973), British footballer, played for Plymouth Argyle and Southampton

=== Other sports ===
- Michael Evans (Australian footballer) (born 1992), Australian rules footballer
- Mike Evans (basketball) (born 1955), former NBA player and current coach
- Mike Ronay Evans (born 1959), American heavyweight boxer
- Michael Evans (boxer) (born 1977), American lightweight boxer
- Michael Evans (cricketer) (1908–1974), English cricketer
- J. Michael Evans (born 1957), Canadian Olympic rower; Goldman Sachs, Alibaba executive
- Michael Evans (water polo) (born 1960), American Olympic water polo player

== Other people ==
- Michael Evans (actor) (1920–2007), original cast member of Gigi
- Michael Evans (photographer) (1944–2005), presidential photographer
- Michael Evans (bishop) (1951–2011), Roman Catholic bishop of East Anglia, England
- Michael H. Evans, CEO and co-founder of The Vines of Mendoza
- Mike Evans (actor) (1949–2006), American actor on The Jeffersons, co-creator of Good Times
- Michael D. Evans (born 1947), Christian American political author
- Michael Evans (politician) (born 1975), member of the Mississippi House of Representatives
- Michael Evans (cellist), see List of Stradivarius instruments

== Fictional characters ==
- Michael Evans, on the sitcom Good Times
- Mike Evans, in the 2012 film Snow Shark
- Mike Evans, co-founder of the Earth-Trisolaris Organization in the Three-Body trilogy
