= Ralph Evans =

Ralph Evans may refer to:

- Ralph Evans (boxer) (born 1953), British Olympic bronze medalist
- Ralph Evans (cricketer) (1891–1929), English first-class cricketer
- Ralph Evans (footballer) (1915–1996), English forward in the Football League
- Ralph Evans (violinist) (born 1953), American violinist in the Fine Arts Quartet
- Ralph Evans (sailor) (1924–2000), American sailor and Olympic medalist
