= Adrienne Evans =

British digital media scholar

- Education: University of Bath
- Scientific career
- Fields: Digital media, feminist theory
- Workplaces: Coventry University

Adrienne Evans is a British Professor at the Centre for Postdigital Cultures Coventry University, and sits on the editorial board of the Journal of Gender Studies.

== Education ==
Adrienne Evans gained her Ph.D. from the University of Bath.

== Bibliography ==
=== Books ===
- Evans, Adrienne; Riley, Sarah (2014). Technologies of sexiness: sex, identity, and consumer culture. New York: Oxford University Press. ISBN 9780199914760.
- Evans, Adrienne; Riley, Sarah; Robson, Martine (2019). Postfeminism and Health. Abingdon, London: Routledge.
- Evans, Adrienne; Riley, Sarah (2023). Digital Feeling. Palgrave Macmillan.

=== Chapters in books ===
- Evans, Adrienne (2015), "Representing sex and celebrity.", in Attwood, Feona; Smith, Clarissa; McNair, Brian; Egan, R. Danielle, Routledge Companion to Media Sex and Sexuality. London: Routledge.
- Evans, Adrienne (2016), "The entrepreneurial practices of becoming a doll.", in Gill, Rosalind; Scharff, Christina; Elias, Ana Sofia, Aesthetic labour: rethinking beauty politics in neoliberalism. Houndmills, Basingstoke, Hampshire New York: Palgrave Macmillan.

=== Journal articles ===
- Evans, Adrienne; Riley, Sarah; Shankar, Avi (February 2010). "Technologies of sexiness: theorizing women's engagement in the sexualization of culture". Feminism & Psychology. 20 (1): February 2010. doi:10.1177/0959353509351854. S2CID 145136872.
- Evans, Adrienne; Riley, Sarah; Shankar, Avi (August 2010). "Postfeminist heterotopias: negotiating 'safe' and 'seedy' in the British sex shop space". European Journal of Women's Studies. 17 (3): August 2010. doi:10.1177/1350506810368817. S2CID 145479496.
- Evans, Adrienne; Riley, Sarah (2013). "Immaculate consumption: negotiating the sex symbol in postfeminist celebrity culture" (PDF). Journal of Gender Studies. 22 (3): 268–281. doi:10.1080/09589236.2012.658145. S2CID 144765688.
- Evans, Adrienne; Stasi, Mafalda (December 2013). "Glitter(foot)ball tactics: negotiating mainstream gender equality in Iceland" (PDF). Men and Masculinities. 16 (5): 560–578. doi:10.1177/1097184X13511251. S2CID 53413643.
- Evans, Adrienne; Keenan, John (2014). "'I am a Starbucks worker … my life no longer belongs to me': the performance of estrangement as a learning tool" (PDF). Teaching in Higher Education. 19 (2): 101–112. doi:10.1080/13562517.2013.836100. S2CID 143581101.
- Evans, Adrienne; Broekhuizen, Francien (2014). "Pain, pleasure and bridal beauty: mapping postfeminist bridal perfection" (PDF). Journal of Gender Studies. 25 (3): 335–348. doi:10.1080/09589236.2014.959478. S2CID 143550700.
- Evans, Adrienne; Stasi, Mafalda (2014). "Desperately seeking methods: new directions in fan studies research" (PDF). Participations. 11 (2): 4–23.
