= Terry Evans =

Terry Evans may refer to:

- Terry Evans (wrestler) (1911–?), Canadian freestyle sport wrestler
- Terry Evans (musician) (1937–2018), American R&B, blues, and soul singer, guitarist and songwriter
- Terry Evans (footballer, born 1965), English professional footballer
- Terry Evans (footballer, born 1976), Welsh professional footballer
- Terry Evans (baseball) (born 1982), American baseball outfielder
- Terry Evans (photographer) (born 1944), American photographer

== See also ==
- Terence T. Evans (1940–2011), American judge
- Terrence Evans (1934–2015), American actor
