= Dennis Evans =

Dennis Evans may refer to:

- Dennis Evans (footballer, born 1930) (1930–2000), English footballer who played for Arsenal
- Dennis Evans (footballer, born 1935), footballer who played for Wrexham and Tranmere Rovers
- Dennis F. Evans (1928–1990), English chemist

== See also ==
- Denis Evans (born 1951), Australian scientist
