= Steve Evans =

Steve, Steven or Stephen Evans may refer to:

== Sports ==
- Steve Evans (baseball) (1885–1943), American baseball player
- Steve Evans (broadcaster) (1942–2000), American motorsports announcer
- Steve Evans (rugby league) (1957/58–2017), English rugby league footballer
- Steve Evans (footballer, born 1962), Scottish football manager
- Stephen Evans (rower) (born 1962), Australian rower
- Steven Evans (cricketer) (born 1967), Sint Maartener cricketer
- Steve Evans (field hockey) (born 1976), South African field hockey player
- Steve Evans (footballer, born 1979), Welsh international footballer
- Stephen Evans (footballer) (born 1980), Welsh footballer with Carmarthen Town
- Steven Evans (soccer) (born 1991), American soccer player
- Steve Hunt (footballer, born 1956), English soccer player who changed his name to Evans after retirement

== Other ==
- Stephen R. Evans (?–2017), politician, public administrator and author from Borneo
- Steve Evans (poet), Australian poet connected with Friendly Street Poets in Adelaide, South Australia
- C. Stephen Evans (born 1948), American philosopher
- Stephen Evans (pharmacoepidemiologist) (born 1943), British pharmacoepidemiologist and medical statistician
- Stephen Evans (diplomat) (born 1950), British High Commissioner to Bangladesh
- Stephen Evans (journalist) (born c. 1955), BBC correspondent
- Steven Neil Evans (born 1960), Australian-American statistician and mathematician
- Stephen C. Evans (born 1963), admiral in the United States Navy
- Steve Evans (writer) (born 1963), American journalist and film historian
- Stephen Evans (actor) (born 1970), British actor and writer
- Steve Evans (darts player) (born 1972), Welsh darts player

== See also ==
- Stephen EvEns, both an alias of and a band formed by Stephen Gilchrist
