= Malcolm Evans =

Malcolm Evans may refer to:

- Sir Malcolm Evans (academic lawyer), British jurist
- Malcolm Evans (cartoonist) (born 1945), New Zealand cartoonist
- Malcolm Evans (computer programmer) (born 1944), British computer programmer
- Mal Evans (1935–1976), road manager for The Beatles
