= Craig Evans =

Craig Evans may refer to:

- Craig Evans (Australian footballer) (born 1965), Australian rules footballer who played in the VFL
- Craig Evans (Zimbabwean sportsman) (born 1969), Zimbabwean cricketer and rugby union footballer
- Craig Evans (Welsh cricketer) (born 1971), former Welsh cricket batsman
- Craig A. Evans (born 1952), Canadian biblical scholar and apologist
- Craig Evans (boxer) (born 1989), Welsh boxer
- Craig Evans (referee) (born 1991), Welsh rugby union referee
- Lawrence Craig Evans (born 1949), American mathematician
