= Eric Evans =

Eric Evans may refer to:

== Sportspeople ==
- Eric Evans (rugby union, born 1894) (1894–1955), Wales rugby union footballer and administrator
- Eric Evans (rugby union, born 1921) (1921–1991), English rugby union footballer
- Eric Evans (canoeist) (born 1950), American competitive canoer

== Others ==
- Eric Evans (priest, born 1928) (1928–1996), Anglican priest and Dean of St Paul's (London)
- Eric J. Evans (fl. 1966–2011), British academic and historian
- Eric Evans (priest, born 1902) (1902–1977), Archdeacon of Warrington
- Eric Evans (technologist), a technologist who coined the term domain-driven design in 2003
