= Walter Evans =

Walter Evans may refer to:

== Sportsmen ==
- Walter Rice Evans (1863–1909), Welsh rugby union player
- Walter Evans (footballer, born 1867) (1867–1897), Aston Villa F.C. and Wales international footballer
- Walter Evans (Bilbao footballer) (fl. 1901–1904), English footballer who played as a striker for Athletic Club
- Allan Evans (Australian sportsman) (Walter Allan Evans, 1897–1955), Western Australian cricketer and footballer

== Other people ==
- Walter Evans (American politician) (1842–1923), American judge and politician from Kentucky
- Walter Jenkin Evans (1856–1927), Welsh Presbyterian academic and writer
- Walter Howard Evans (1870–1959), judge for the United States Customs Court
- Sir Walter Evans, 1st Baronet (1872–1954), English hydraulic engineer, politician and public servant
- Walter R. Evans (1920–1999), American control theorist

== See also ==
- Walter Evans Edge (1873–1956), American governor of New Jersey, 1917–1919, 1944–1947
- Walter Evans-Wentz (1878–1965), American anthropologist
