= Brad Evans =

Brad Evans may refer to:

- Brad Evans (soccer) (born 1985), American soccer player
- Brad Evans (author) (born 1974), political philosopher, critical theorist and writer
- Brad Evans (cricketer) (born 1997), Zimbabwean cricketer
- Brad Evans (cyclist) (born 1992), New Zealand cyclist
