= Owen Evans =

Owen Evans may refer to:

- Owen Evans (politician) (1876–1945), Liberal Party politician from Wales
- Jem Evans (Owen James Evans, 1867–1942), Welsh rugby union half-back
- Owen Evans (rugby union) (born 1989), Welsh rugby union prop forward
- Owen Evans (Australian footballer) (1916–1972), Australian rules footballer
- Owen Evans (priest) (1864–1937), Anglican priest and author
- Owen Evans (Welsh footballer) (born 1996), Welsh football goalkeeper
- Tom Owen-Evans (born 1997), English footballer
- Owen P. Evans (1927–2018), American football player and coach
- Owen Evans (civil servant), Welsh civil servant
- Owen Richard Evans, former drummer for AJJ (band) and musician known for solo project Roar
