= Jason Evans =

Jason Evans may refer to:

- Jason Evans (photographer) (born 1968), Welsh photographer and lecturer on photography
- Jason Evans (bowls) (born 1971), South African lawn bowler
- Jason T. Evans, United States Army general
- Jason Evans (musician) (born 1987), former vocalist of Ingested
- Jason Evans (campaigner) (born 1989), British campaigner on the infected blood scandal
