= Gene Evans (pyrotechnician) =

American pyrotechnician (1937–2008)

Gene Evans (July 25, 1937, Detroit – July 8, 2008, Anaheim) was an American pyrotechnician. In addition to being one of the pyrotechnic designers for the 1986 Statue of Liberty centennial celebration, and having designed special effects for a number of Las Vegas shows, Evans was perhaps best known as the man behind all fireworks displays at Hollywood Bowl concerts, from 1969 through 2008, with his final performance coming only days before his death.
