= Thomas Evans (17th-century poet) =

British poet

Thomas Evans (died 1633) was an English poet.

== Life ==
Evans was educated at Corpus Christi College, Cambridge, where he graduated B.A. in 1612, M.A. in 1616, and B.D. in 1628. He was presented to the rectory of Little Holland, Essex, in 1618, and held that benefice till his death in 1633.

== Works ==
Evans was the author of Oedipus, a rare poetical work. It is dedicated to John Clapham, one of the six clerks in chancery, and in a pedantic preliminary address, the author says that it is his "first child, but not the heyre of all the fathers wit: there is some laid up to enrich a second brother, to keepe it from accustomed dishonesty, when I shall put it to shift into the world; yet if this prove a griefe to the parent, I will instantly be divorc't from Thalia, and make myself happy in the progeny from a better stocke". Each canto contains about six hundred lines, rhyming alternately.
