= Roger Evans =

Roger Evans may refer to:

- Roger Evans (London politician) (born 1964), member of the London Assembly
- Roger Evans (British Army officer) (1886–1968), British Army officer
- Roger Evans (footballer) (1879–1974), Welsh footballer
- Roger Evans (Monmouth MP) (born 1947), British politician, MP for Monmouth
- Roger Evans, a character in the TV series Sister, Sister
