= Trevor Evans =

Trevor or Trefor Evans may refer to:

== People ==
- Trevor Evans (priest) (1937–2020), Anglican priest
- Trevor Evans (politician) (born 1981), Australian politician
- Trevor Evans (journalist) (1902–1981), British journalist
- Trevor Evans (mathematician) (1925–1991), British and American mathematician
  - Trevor Evans Award, an award of the Mathematical Association of America
- Trevor Evans (scientist) (1927–2010), British physicist
- Trefor Evans (rugby union) (born 1947), Wales rugby union player
- Trefor Evans (diplomat) (1913–1974), British diplomat

== Fictional characters ==
- Trevor Evans (Fireman Sam), character from Fireman Sam
- Trevor Evans (Suits), a character from Suits
- Trevor Evans (Doctors), a character from Doctors
- Trevor Evans (Ozark), a character from Ozark
