= Larry Evans =

Larry Evans may refer to:

- Larry Evans (American football) (born 1953), American football linebacker
- Larry Evans (author) (died 1925), American writer
- Larry Evans (chess player) (1932–2010), American chess grandmaster
