= Sidney Evans =

Sidney or Sydney Evans may refer to:

- Sidney Evans (footballer) (1893–?), or Sid, English footballer
- Sidney Evans (boxer) (1881–1927), or Sid, British boxer
- Sydney Hall Evans (1915–1995), Dean of Salisbury
- Len Evans (footballer) (Sidney John Vivian Leonard Evans, 1903–1977), Welsh footballer

== See also ==
- Evans (surname)
