= Peter Evans =

Peter Evans may refer to:

- Peter Evans (actor) (1950–1989), American actor
- Peter Evans (musician) (born 1981), American musician, specializes in improvisation and avant-garde music
- Peter Evans (musicologist) (1929–2018), British musicologist, author of The Music of Benjamin Britten
- Peter Evans (restaurateur) (1926–2014), British restaurateur
- Peter Evans (radio personality) (1927–1985), 3LO breakfast announcer 1965–1986
- Peter Evans (rugby union) (1928–2014), Welsh rugby union player
- Peter Evans (swimmer) (born 1961), Australian swimmer, won a gold medal at the 1980 Summer Olympics
- Peter Evans (sailor) (born 1961), New Zealand Olympic sailor
- Peter Evans (author) (died 2012), British journalist and author
- Peter B. Evans (born 1944), political sociologist
- Peter Evans, fictional character in the Tracy Letts play Bug
- Pete Evans (born 1973), Australian chef and television presenter

== See also ==
- Peter Darvill-Evans (born 1954), British writer and editor
