= Marlon Evans =

Guamanian footballer

Personal information
- Full name: Marlon Uchiyama Evans
- Date of birth: August 3, 1997 (age 29)
- Height: 1.80 m (5 ft 11 in)
- Position: Midfielder

College career
Years	Team	Apps	(Gls)
2015–2018	North Greenville Crusaders		

Senior career*
Years	Team	Apps	(Gls)
2013–2019	Wings F.C.		
2019	Detroit City		

International career^{‡}
2013–	Guam U-18	5	(0)
2014–	Guam	8	(0)
- * Club domestic league appearances and goals as of 22 July 2020 ‡ National team caps and goals as of 13 June 2021

Marlon Uchiyama Evans (born 3 August 1997) is a Guamanian international footballer. He previously played for Wings F.C. in the Guam Men's Soccer League, Detroit City FC, and captained the North Greenville Crusaders.

== Career ==
Beginning in 2013, Evans played for Guam Men's Soccer League club Wings F.C.

== International ==
He made his first appearance for the Guam national football team in 2014.
