= Nancy Evans =

Nancy Evans may refer to:

- Nancy Evans (table tennis) (1903–1998), Welsh table tennis player
- Nancy Evans (mezzo-soprano) (1915–2000), British opera singer (mezzo-soprano)
- Nancy Evans (actress) (1910–1963), American actress in Treasury Men in Action and Life with Father
- Nancy Evans (softball) (born 1975), American softball player and coach in 1997 Women's College World Series
- Nancy Hasty Evans (born 1948), Massachusetts politician
