= Journal of Gender Studies =

- Discipline: Interdisciplinary gender studies
- Language: English

Publication details
- History: 1991–present
- Publisher: Routledge (United Kingdom)
- Frequency: Quarterly
- Impact factor: 2.539 (2020)

Standard abbreviations
- ISO 4: J. Gend. Stud.

Indexing
- CODEN: JGESEH
- ISSN: 0958-9236 (print); 1465-3869 (web)
- LCCN: 2001238211
- OCLC no.: 321078833

Links
- Journal homepage; Online access; Online archive

The Journal of Gender Studies is a leading British peer-reviewed journal for interdisciplinary gender studies, published by Routledge. It has been published since 1991, and publishes articles relating to gender from a feminist perspective covering a wide range of disciplines. It aims to create a dialogue among the different academic fields that engage with ideas and theories of gender.

According to the Journal Citation Reports, its 2020 impact factor is 2.539.

== See also ==
- List of women's studies journals
