= Tim Evans =

Tim or Timothy Evans may refer to:

- Tim Evans, an American-born Australian comedian and talent show judge, who married Australian singer-actress Elaine McKenna in 1963
- Tim Evans (footballer) (born 1953), Australian rules football player
- Tim Evans (British Army officer) (born 1962)
- Tim Evans (rowing) (born 1970), American Olympic rower
- Timothy Evans (1924–1950), Welshman wrongly executed for murder
- Timothy C. Evans (born 1943), American judge

== See also ==
- Tim Rhys-Evans (born c. 1972), Welsh conductor
