= Phil Evans (Australian footballer) =

Australian rules footballer

Personal information
- Full name: Philip Evans
- Nickname: Phil Evans
- Born: 23 January 1950 (age 76)
- Original team: Burnie

Playing career^{1}
Years	Club	Games (Goals)
1970 — 1971	Geelong	27 (8)
- ^{1} Playing statistics correct to the end of 1971.

Philip Evans (born 23 January 1950) (more commonly known as Phil Evans; born 23 January 1950) is a former Australian rules footballer who played for Geelong in the Victorian Football League (now known as the Australian Football League). He also played alongside his brother Tim Evans with the Geelong Cats.
