= Wayne Evans =

Wayne Evans may refer to:

- Wayne Evans (Australian footballer) (born 1958), former Australian rules footballer
- Wayne Evans (Welsh footballer) (1971–2023), Welsh football player with Walsall and Rochdale
- Wayne Evans (rugby league) (born 1974), former professional rugby league footballer
- Wayne Evans (rugby union) (born 1984), Welsh rugby union scrum half
