= Lloyd Evans =

Lloyd Evans may refer to:

- Annie Lloyd Evans (1873–1938), Welsh educator
- D. L. Evans (1933–1990), British cricketer
- Dudley Lloyd-Evans (1895–1972), British soldier and airman
- Lloyd Evans (athlete) (1915–2002), Canadian Olympic runner
- Lloyd Evans (plant physiologist) (1927–2015), New Zealand plant physiologist who made his career in Australia
- Lloyd Evans (rugby union, born 1990), Welsh rugby union player
- Lloyd Evans (rugby union, born 1995), English rugby union player
- Martin Lloyd-Evans (born 1963), British opera director
- Tom Lloyd-Evans (1941–2014), British astronomer
