= Alison Evans =

British economist

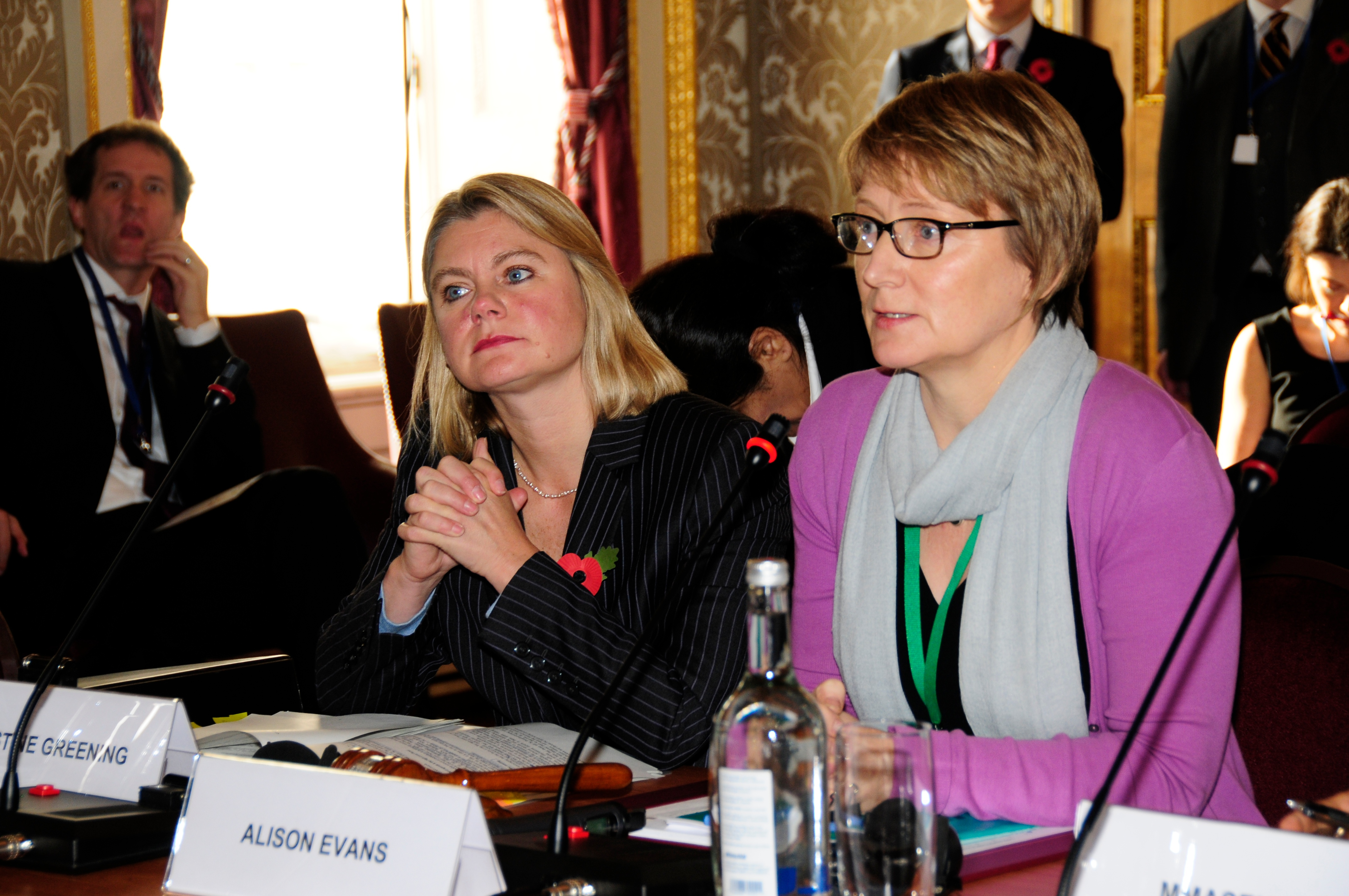
Evans (right) with Justine Greening in 2012

Alison Evans is a British economist. She is director general of Independent Evaluation Group at the World Bank Group since January 2019. Before her current role, Evans was the Chief Commissioner of the UK's Independent Commission for Aid Impact (ICAI) based in London, England, where she led the evolution of that organization's scrutiny mandate. Prior to joining ICAI, she was executive director of the Overseas Development Institute (ODI) in the United Kingdom.

For six years, Evans was a senior economist at the World Bank, and a member of the team producing the World Development Report 1997, as well as a senior evaluation specialist in the World Bank Operations Evaluation Department (former name for the Independent Evaluation Group).

She earned a Ph.D. in development studies from the University of Sussex and a master's degree in economics and politics from the University of Cambridge.

Evans has served as a trustee on multiple boards, including Oxford Policy Management, BBC Media Action, The Christian Michelsen Institute (CMI), The Baring Foundation and Social Finance UK.
