= Rheece Evans =

South African football player

Personal information
- Full name: Rheece Craig Evans
- Date of birth: 28 August 1990 (age 36)
- Place of birth: Durban, South Africa
- Positions: Right-back; midfielder

Youth career
- Santos Cape Town
- Villa Park FC

Senior career*
Years	Team	Apps	(Gls)
2010–2014	Maritzburg United	73	(3)
2014–2015	Mamelodi Sundowns	2	(0)
2016–2018	Ajax Cape Town	12	(0)
- * Club domestic league appearances and goals

Rheece Evans (born 28 August 1990) is a South African football player who played as a defender and midfielder.

The defender was bought in to bolster a back four in the winter of 2014 and will look to break into the first XI immediately. He was brought to Sundowns after having an impressive season at Maritzburg United. He is seen as a speedy and offensive right back.
