= Reginald Evans =

English footballer

Personal information
- Date of birth: 18 March 1939 (age 87)
- Place of birth: Consett, England
- Position: Left winger

Senior career*
Years	Team	Apps	(Gls)
1956–1959	Newcastle United	4	(0)
1959–1960	Charlton Athletic	2	(1)
- * Club domestic league appearances and goals

Reginald Evans (born 18 March 1939 in Consett, County Durham) is a former footballer for Newcastle United from 1956 to 1959.

In the mid-fifties great things were expected from Reg; however, he failed to live up to his early potential and moved on after 4 appearances for Newcastle.

1959 saw him move to Charlton Athletic and then onto Ashington.

Evans worked as a brewer for Newcastle Breweries for nearly 40 years until 1996, when he became a tour guide at the brewery.
