= Ifor Evans, Baron Evans of Hungershall =

Leader of the House of Lords (UK)

The Right Honourable The Lord Evans of Hungershall

Member of the House of Lords Lord Temporal
- In office 25 August 1967 – 28 August 1982; Life peerage

Personal details
- Born: 19 August 1899
- Died: 28 August 1982 (aged 83)

Benjamin Ifor Evans, Baron Evans of Hungershall (19 August 1899 – 28 August 1982), was a British academic and university administrator. He was Provost of University College London from 1951 to 1966. He spent a year in the Middle East and reported on the state of English and English literature there in 1944. Accordingly, he reached the conclusion that the English Association and the British Council should do more to present English literature to men and women whose first language is not English. He published A Short History of English Literature, 1940; reprint 1955.

He was knighted by HM The Queen at Buckingham Palace 12 July 1955, and was created a life peer as Baron Evans of Hungershall, in the Borough of Royal Tunbridge Wells, on 25 August 1967.

Academic offices
Preceded by David Pye	Provost of University College London; 1951–1966	Succeeded by Noel Annan
