= Brian Evans (Glamorgan cricketer) =

Welsh cricketer

Personal information
- Full name: John Brian Evans
- Born: 9 November 1936; Clydach, Wales
- Died: 1 May 2011 (aged 74); Grimsby, Lincolnshire, England
- Nickname: Ginger
- Batting: Right-handed
- Bowling: Right-arm fast-medium

Domestic team information
- Years: Team
- 1958–1963: Glamorgan
- 1965–1971: Lincolnshire

Career statistics
Competition	First-class	List A
Matches	88	5
Runs scored	1535	18
Batting average	13.70	6.00
100s/50s	0/7	0/0
Top score	62*	13*
Balls bowled	14,263	338
Wickets	251	3
Bowling average	27.04	70.66
5 wickets in innings	10	0
10 wickets in match	0	n/a
Best bowling	8/42	1/26
Catches/stumpings	46/–	1/–
- Source: Cricinfo, 2 August 2017

John Brian Evans (9 November 1936 – 1 May 2011) was a Welsh cricketer. He played first-class and List A cricket for Glamorgan from 1958 to 1963. He also played Minor Counties and List A cricket for Lincolnshire from 1965 to 1971. He was born at Clydach, Glamorgan, Wales, and died at Grimsby, Lincolnshire, England.

A right-arm fast-medium bowler, Evans' best first-class bowling figures were 8 for 42, when he and Ossie Wheatley bowled unchanged to dismiss Somerset for 87 in July 1961. Injury forced him to retire from first-class cricket in 1964, but he was able to take up a position as a professional cricketer in Grimsby. In the Minor Counties Championship he and his opening partner Norman McVicker each took 71 wickets when Lincolnshire won the championship for the first time in 1966.
