= Eric Evans (rugby union, born 1894) =

Welsh rugby union player and official

- Born: William Eric Evans; 27 February 1894 Neath, Wales
- Died: 21 June 1955 (aged 61)
- School: Neath Intermediate School
- University: St Catharine's College, Cambridge
- Occupation(s): School teacher Sports administrator

Rugby union career
- Position: wing threequarter
Amateur team(s)
Years	Team	Apps	(Points)
- Neath RFC

William Eric Evans (27 February 1894 – 21 June 1955) was a Welsh rugby player and the secretary of the Welsh Rugby Union from 1948–1955.

Born in Neath in 1894, Evans left Wales to study at St Catharine's College, Cambridge. He returned to Neath during his vacations where he played for the Neath Rugby Club. The outbreak of the First World War prevented Evans completing his university education and he was posted at Gallipoli. After the end of hostilities he returned to Cambridge and graduated in 1922. He returned to Wales and became English master and rugby coach of Cardiff High School. In 1923 he was one of the founding members of the Welsh Secondary Schools Rugby Union (WSSRU), to which the turn in fortune in Welsh rugby in the 1930s is attributed. He was a director of the Cardiff Arms Park Company and was a freeman of Haverfordwest.

In 1948 Evans would replace fellow Neath stalwart, Walter E. Rees, as secretary of the Welsh Rugby Union, after acting as honorary assistant secretary for the previous two years. Evans was a popular choice having been a member of the union for the last twenty one years and proving through his connections with the WSSRU his commitment to the advancement of the Welsh game. In his first season as secretary he brought clear administration and a sense of professionalism. During his first Christmas in charge he returned nearly a hundred gifts from various donors who were hoping for some consideration in the distribution of international tickets.

In 1955 Evans died while still in office; during his time as secretary he saw Wales win two Triple Crowns and the formation of the Welsh Youth Union in 1949.

== Bibliography ==
- Smith, David; Williams, Gareth (1980). Fields of Praise: The Official History of The Welsh Rugby Union. Cardiff: University of Wales Press. ISBN 0-7083-0766-3.
- Owen, O.L., ed. (1956). Playfair Rugby Football Annual 1955-56. London: Playfair Books Ltd.
