= Terry Evans (footballer, born 1976) =

Welsh footballer

Personal information
- Full name: Terence Evans
- Date of birth: 8 January 1976 (age 50)
- Place of birth: Pontypridd, Wales
- Height: 1.78 m (5 ft 10 in)
- Position: Full back

Youth career
- 1991–1993: Cardiff City

Senior career*
Years	Team	Apps	(Gls)
1993–1995	Cardiff City	14	(0)
1995–2001	Barry Town	177	(13)
2001–2003	Swansea City	43	(0)
2003–2004	Newport County	41	(0)
2005	Cardiff Grange Quins	14	(0)
2005–2006	Newport County	13	(0)
2006–2007	Carmarthen Town	30	(2)
2007–2011	Haverfordwest County	107	(1)
2013–2014	Cambrian & Clydach Vale		

International career
1994–199?	Wales U21	3	(0)
- * Club domestic league appearances and goals

Terence Evans (born 8 January 1976) is a Welsh former professional footballer who played as a defender.

== Career ==
Evans began his career as a youth team member at Cardiff City. After completing a two-year YTS scheme, he made his professional debut in a 2–1 defeat to Bristol Rovers in January 1994 and made a handful of appearances during the season, including earning under 21 caps for Wales. He switched to the Welsh Premier League to play for Barry Town and was part of the side that found some success in European football.

In 2001, he returned to The Football League with Swansea City where, after beginning the season on the bench, he established himself in the first team, making 16 appearances in all competitions, before his season was ended in February 2002 when he suffered a double fracture in his jaw after being struck by a deliberate elbow thrown by David Partridge during a match against Leyton Orient on 9 February 2002. Evans was released by Swansea at the end of the 2002–03 season, moving to non-league club Newport County. After one season at Newport he was released by then manager Peter Nicolas in June 2005. He then had a brief spell playing for Cardiff Grange Quins, but re-joined Newport County in 2005.

He joined Welsh Premier League side Haverfordwest County in 2007, making over 100 appearances for the club before retiring on medical advice in 2011. He later played for Cambrian & Clydach Vale.
