= Roy Evans (engineer) =

British scholar

Professor Roy Evans CBE FREng FICE FIStructE FLSW

Vice-Chancellor, University College of North Wales/University of Wales, Bangor
- In office 1995–2004

Professor of Civil and Structural Engineering, University College, Cardiff/University of Wales College of Cardiff
- In office 1983–1995

Personal details
- Born: Hubert Roy Evans; 27 May 1942 (age 83) Llandysul, Cardiganshire, Wales

Hubert Roy Evans (born 27 May 1942) is a Welsh civil engineer and academic.

He is a native of Llandysul, in Ceredigion, Wales. A graduate of Swansea University (Wales) he became Professor of Civil and Structural Engineering at Cardiff University, where he spent 26 years of his career.

He won international recognition as a civil engineer, receiving numerous awards (including the George Stephenson Medal in 1980) and became a Fellow of the Royal Academy of Engineering in 1992. Evans was appointed Commander of the Order of the British Empire in 2002, for services to higher education.

He served as Deputy Principal at Cardiff University for four years before his appointment as the Vice Chancellor of the University of Wales, Bangor in 1995, retiring in 2004. He was a Welsh Supernumerary Fellow of Jesus College, Oxford for the academic year 1998/9.

He is a Founding Fellow of the Learned Society of Wales.

Academic offices
| Preceded by Eric Sunderland | Vice-Chancellor of the University of Wales, Bangor | Succeeded by Merfyn Jones |
