= Donald Evans (artist) =

American artist (1945–1977)

Donald Evans was an American artist (1945–1977), who was known for creating hand-painted postage stamps (artistamps) of fictional countries. Evans died in a fire in the Netherlands in 1977.

While Evans initially painted postage stamps as a child, he returned to making them in 1971, shortly after graduating from Cornell University and training as an architectural designer with Richard Meier and Associates in New York City. During a six-year period from 1971 to 1977, he painted faux stamps issued by forty-two countries he conjured in his imagination.

To make his art, Evans usually traced each stamp design in pencil, then completed it with a No. 2 Grumbacher paintbrush, watercolor, and pen and ink. To simulate stamp perforations, Evans pounded out a series of periods on an old typewriter.

Evans catalogued all of his creations in a book he called the Catalogue of the World, which resembled a stamp-collecting catalogue in layout and style.

Evans traveled widely during the six-year period in which he painted professionally, often renting small flats or staying with friends. Given the tiny scale of his art, he could pack an entire gallery exhibition under his arm. He enjoyed considerable success while he was alive, and had solo gallery shows in Amsterdam, London, New York City, Paris and Washington, D.C.

On April 29, 1977, Evans's Amsterdam apartment building caught fire. He did not escape. But after his death his reputation continued to grow, particularly after the publication of Willy Eisenhart’s The World of Donald Evans in 1980 (followed by a second edition in 1994). Several prominent critics and authors have admired Evans’s work, including Bruce Chatwin, Adam Gopnik, Nick Bantock and Takashi Hiraide.

Chatwin's admiration was effusive: "By common consent, the art of the drop-out generation is a mess -- and the art of Donald Evans is the antithesis of mess. Nor is it niggling. Nor is it precious. Yet I can't think of another artist who expressed more succinctly and beautifully the best aspirations of those years: the flight from war and the machine; the asceticism; the nomadic restlessness; the yearning for sensual cloud-cuckoo-lands; the retreat from public into private obsessions, from the big and noisy to the small and still."

== Legacy ==
Evans' stamps can be found digitally, as well as in many museums and private collections.

From December 9, 1979 until January 27, 1980 the Museum of Modern Art, MoMA, displayed Donald Evans' stamps in an exhibit titled, Artists' Stamps and Stamp Images.

Takashi Hiraide wrote a book entitled Postcards to Donald Evans, published in 2003. It is a collection of postcards, written to the deceased artist and mailed between 1985-1988. Hiraide offers an explanation of the postcards in the "Afterword" of his book, "These words of correspondence were written to the deceased painter, but he was not the addressee. They were at the same time supposed to be delivered to the . . . imaginary worlds he belonged to."

The same publisher of Hiraide's book, Tibor de Nagy Editions, is an imprint of the Tibor de Nagy Foundation, which funds the Tibor de Nagy Gallery. The Gallery has digitally memorialized Donald Evans' work. The Tibor de Nagy Gallery has had six exhibits showcasing Evans' stamps, which can also be categorized as mail art, between the years 2009-2022. The exhibits are listed on the Gallery's website, under the Estate of Donald Evans. The webpage also includes a listing for a publication from 1999 and an article which accompanied the 2022 exhibit, "A Travelogue of Imaginary Lands in Stamps" by John Yau in Hyperallergic.

Evans' stamps has also been showcased on Atlas Obscura. In 2017, an article titled, "The Subversive World of ‘Cinderella Stamps’" by Emily Cleaver includes background information on the artist and several images of the stamps.

For recent exhibits showcasing Evans' work, auctions, and articles about Donald Evans imaginary worlds via stamps, more information can be found via the Donald Evans page on the Mutual Art website.

== Bibliography ==
- Calvino, Italo "Stamps from States of Mind", Collection of Sand (Penguin Classics) 1984, Eng. trans. 2013.
- Chatwin, Bruce "The Album of Donald Evans," The New York Review of Books, Volume 28, Number 8 (May 14, 1981).
- Eisenhart, Willy The World of Donald Evans (Harlin Quist Books) 1980.
- Gopnik, Adam On (Or, Rather, To) Donald Evans. (Tibor De Nagy Gallery) 1999.
