= Michael H. Evans =

Michael Evans is the CEO and Co-Founder of The Vines of Mendoza. Evans served on the John Kerry presidential campaign, and was COO of the Rock the Vote Campaign. He was also previously Executive Director of CTIA Foundation, an international association for the wireless telecommunications industry and ran business development for iNetnow, a start-up Web-based concierge service in 2000. Evans is also a photographer.

== The Vines of Mendoza ==
Evans, a former technology and political executive, went on vacation to Mendoza, Argentina in 2004. Shortly after meeting his business partner Pablo Gimenez Riili, they formed The Vines of Mendoza together.

With Riili, Evans raised money from friends and family, purchased 900 acres of land in the Uco Valley, and created The Vines of Mendoza's private vineyard estates.

Evans and Riili also established The Vines of Mendoza Tasting Room that provides 100 Argentine wines in one location. The Acequia Wine Club and The Vines Online Wine Store were also created at that time.
