= Craig Evans (Welsh cricketer) =

Welsh cricketer

Personal information
- Full name: Craig Evans
- Born: 15 November 1971 (age 54); Neath, Glamorgan, Wales
- Batting: Right-handed
- Bowling: Right-arm off break

Domestic team information
- Years: Team
- 1994–1995: Wales Minor Counties

Career statistics
Competition	List A
Matches	1
Runs scored	12
Batting average	12.00
100s/50s	–/–
Top score	12
Balls bowled	–
Wickets	–
Bowling average	–
5 wickets in innings	–
10 wickets in match	–
Best bowling	–
Catches/stumpings	–/–
- Source: Cricinfo, 13 February 2011

Craig Evans (born 15 November 1971) is a former Welsh cricketer. Evans was a right-handed batsman who bowled right-arm off break. He was born in Neath, Glamorgan.

Evans made his debut for Wales Minor Counties in 1994 in the Minor Counties Championship against Herefordshire. From 1995 to 1995, he represented the team in six Championship matches, the last of which came against Cheshire. He played just a single MCCA Knockout Trophy fixture for the team, against Staffordshire in 1994. It was also in 1994 that he played his only List A match, when Wales Minor Counties took on Middlesex in the 1st round of the 1994 NatWest Trophy at Northop Hall Cricket Club Ground. In his only List A match he scored 12 runs before being dismissed by Richard Johnson.
