= Allan Evans (Australian sportsman) =

Australian sportsman (1897–1955)

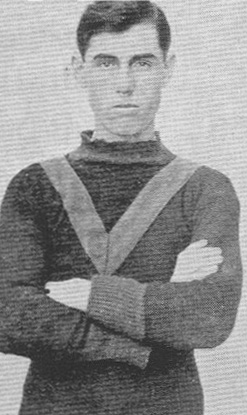
- Evans in the 1920s

Personal information
- Full name: Walter Allan Evans
- Born: 29 September 1897; Gympie, Queensland
- Died: 15 January 1955 (aged 57); Hollywood, Western Australia
- Batting: Left-handed
- Bowling: Right-arm medium
- Role: Bowler

Domestic team information
- Years: Team
- 1921/22–1931/32: Western Australia

Career statistics
Competition	First-class
Matches	22
Runs scored	543
Batting average	14.67
100s/50s	0/1
Top score	53
Balls bowled	3,606
Wickets	38
Bowling average	36.18
5 wickets in innings	1
10 wickets in match	0
Best bowling	5/37
Catches/stumpings	14/–
- Source: CricketArchive, 15 November 2022

Walter Allan Evans (29 September 1897 – 15 January 1955) was an Australian sportsman who played first-class cricket for Western Australia and Australian rules football for Perth in the West Australian Football League (WAFL).

== Biography ==
Although born in Queensland, Evans was brought up in the Western Australian goldfields.

== Australian rules football ==
He captained a Boulder City schoolboy team while in the country and played for North Perth when he moved to the capital city during adolescence.

When he made his WAFL debut with Perth in 1917 it was as a rover but he soon developed into a prolific full-forward, despite standing at only 170 cm. In 1921 he was the league's top goalkicker with 64 goals, despite Perth finishing with the wooden spoon. This tally included 13 goals against East Fremantle, where he kicked all but one of his team's goals. He topped Perth's goalkicking for a second time in 1922 and then every year from 1924 to 1927. His best season total was 69 goals, which he managed in 1927. His performance that season earned him selection in the Western Australian squad which competed in the Melbourne Carnival, however Evans didn't play a game. At the end of the year he announced his retirement but made a comeback in 1929 and scored enough goals to again be Perth's leading forward. He then retired permanently, having played 153 games for Perth and once for Western Australia, when Essendon toured Western Australia in 1924.

== Cricket ==
As a cricketer, Evans was an all-rounder at Western Australian Grade Cricket level but was used more as a bowler when picked for Western Australia. He took part in most of Western Australia's first-class fixtures during the 1920s and was also twice selected to play for an Australian XI, against the touring Marylebone Cricket Club. Statistically he had his best season in 1926/27 when he took 15 wickets at 14.20, with eight of those wickets coming in a match against South Australia. During his first-class career he had the distinction of twice dismissing Wally Hammond, while the England great had been playing for the MCC. His biggest scalp however was undoubtedly Don Bradman, who despite averaging over 100 for the season was sent back to the pavilion by Evans for just 27, in Western Australia's match against the Australian XI in 1929/30.

When playing for East Perth (Perth Cricket Club), Evans was prolific. In the most outstanding all-round career in the club's history he scored 6,708 runs (five centuries) and took a record 554 wickets in 268 matches from 1920 to 1945. Evans was an automatic inclusion in the Perth Cricket Club Team of the Century at the 150th Year celebration in 2012.
