= Roy Evans (rugby league) =

GB international rugby league footballer

Personal information
- Full name: Roy Evans
- Born: c. 1938
- Died: 1987 (aged 49)

Playing information
- Position: Second-row, Loose forward
Club
Years	Team	Pld	T	G	FG	P
1957–65	Wigan	252	34			102
Representative
Years	Team	Pld	T	G	FG	P
1961–62	Great Britain	4	1	0	0	3
1963–65	Lancashire	2	0	0	0	0

Roy Evans (c. 1938 – 1987) was a British professional rugby league footballer who played in the 1950s and 1960s. He played at representative level for Great Britain, and at club level for Wigan, as a second-row, or loose forward.

== Playing career ==
=== Wigan ===
Roy Evans played loose forward in Wigan's 27-3 victory over Wakefield Trinity in the Championship Final during the 1959–60 season at Odsal Stadium, Bradford on Saturday 21 May 1960.

Roy Evans played loose forward in Wigan's 30-13 victory over Hull F.C. in the 1959 Challenge Cup Final during the 1958–59 season at Wembley Stadium, London on Saturday 9 May 1959, in front of a crowd of 79,811, and played right-second-row, i.e. number 12, in the 20-16 victory over Hunslet in the 1965 Challenge Cup Final during the 1964–65 season at Wembley Stadium, London on Saturday 8 May 1965, in front of a crowd of 89,016.

Roy Evans played in Wigan's victories in the Lancashire League during the 1958–59 season and 1961–62 season.

=== International honours ===
Roy Evans won caps for Great Britain while at Wigan in 1961 against New Zealand (2 matches), and in 1962 against France, and New Zealand.

== Post-retirement ==
Evans announced his retirement from rugby league in January 1966. He later worked as director of rugby at Blackpool Borough.

He died in 1987 after a long illness, aged 49.
