= Dennis F. Evans =

English chemist

Dennis Frederick Evans FRS (7 March 1928 – 6 November 1990) was an English chemist who made important contributions to nuclear magnetic resonance, magnetochemistry and other aspects of chemistry.

== Early life ==
Evans was born in Nottingham, England on 28 March 1928. His father George Frederick Evans was a master carpenter and his mother (née Gladys Martha Taylor) was a dressmaker. He was educated at Huntingdon Street Junior School and then won a scholarship to Nottingham High School. In 1946 he entered Oxford with a scholarship to Lincoln College where his tutor was Rex Richards (later Sir Rex Richards FRS). He won the university Gibbs Prize in Chemistry in 1949, and in that year started DPhil work with Richards on calorimetry and the magnetic properties of clathrates containing nitric oxide or oxygen; nine papers resulted from this work. He was an ICI Research Fellow from 1952-5. In 1953-4 he became a postdoctoral research associate at the University of Chicago with Robert S. Mulliken working on the electronic spectra of halogens in organic solvents, producing four papers under his own name.

== Career and research ==
In October 1955 Geoffrey Wilkinson appointed him as a lecturer in inorganic chemistry at Imperial College London. He was subsequently promoted to Senior Lecturer in 1963, Reader in 1964 and Professor in 1981. He was awarded an FRS in 1981.

His research interests ranged widely over a number of topics in inorganic, organic and physical chemistry. Here we select just three areas which made a lasting contribution to chemistry.

I. Measurement of magnetic susceptibility. For paramagnetic inorganic materials in particular, such measurements are often useful. In 1959, he devised a procedure, now called the Evans Method, in which an NMR tube containing the paramagnetic species is dissolved in water-tert-butanol in the presence of a capillary of pure tert-butanol. From the difference in positions of the ^{1}H NMR peak of the hydroxyl peak of pure butanol and the same peak shifted by the paramagnetic substrate the susceptibility of the sample can be calculated. In 1967 he devised an ingenious modification of the classical Gouy balance in which, instead of weighing the sample in a magnetic field, a small but powerful magnet was weighed against the static sample. This was further refined in 1974 by using two 6 g. strong magnets, each mounted on a torsion strip. The force that the static paramagnetic sample exerted on one magnet was balanced out by a current passed through a coil placed between the poles of the second magnet; by measurement of this current the magnetic susceptibility of the sample can be calculated.

II Nuclear magnetic resonance spectroscopy (NMR). In addition to his use of NMR to determine magnetic susceptibilities of species in solution (see above) he made wide use of the technique in the study of organometallic and coordination complexes. He also used the technique of double irradiation of organic compounds to establish the relative signs of coupling constants.

III Inorganic chemistry. He made a number of studies on organometallic and coordination complexes. An example of his ingenuity in this area is to show that divalent lanthanides might show Grignard-like behaviour, and to this end he found that samarium, europium and ytterbium formed such species and that they showed Grignard-type reactions.

== Personal life ==
Evans was looked upon fondly by people close to him, giving freely of his time and his immense knowledge (which was not confined to chemistry) to all who asked for help. Evans donated his time to assist those who asked for his assistance in a variety of topics, not nessesarly confined to chemistry. He kept a range of exotic pets, such as a Cayman Islands alligator and a five-foot sand snake called George fed with live toads obtained from his local Chelsea pub. George escaped into the King’s Road and was after re-capture given by Evans to the London Zoo. He also kept locusts (some of these escaped too), bird-eating lizards and giant scorpions. He became a celebrated member of the Chelsea Arts Club.
