= Ralph Evans (footballer) =

English footballer (1915–1996)

Personal information
- Full name: Denzil Ralph Evans
- Date of birth: 9 October 1915
- Place of birth: Hungerford, Berkshire, England
- Date of death: 20 February 1996 (aged 80)
- Place of death: Langley, Berkshire, England
- Height: 5 ft 10 in (1.78 m)
- Position: Forward

Senior career*
Years	Team	Apps	(Gls)
- Yeovil & Petters United
1934–1936	Bury		
1936–1937	Halifax Town		
1937–1948	Watford	88	(30)
- * Club domestic league appearances and goals

Denzil Ralph Evans (9 October 1915 – 20 February 1996) was an English association footballer.

Born in Hungerford, Evans' first club was Yeovil & Petters United. He joined Football League club Bury on amateur terms in 1934, turning professional at the end of the 1934–35 season. After spending the 1936–37 season at Halifax Town, Evans joined Watford, where he would remain for the rest of his career. The Second World War severely hampered Evans' career, but he managed to finish as Watford's top scorer in 1946–47. His playing days were ended the following year, but Evans stayed at the club as a coach until 1952. He died in 1996, aged 80.
