= Donald Leroy Evans =

American serial killer

Donald Evans
- Mugshot
- Born: Donald Leroy Evans; July 5, 1957; Watervliet, Michigan, U.S.
- Died: January 5, 1999 (aged 41); Mississippi State Penitentiary, Sunflower County, Mississippi, U.S.
- Cause of death: Stab wounds
- Other names: Don, Donny
- Convictions: Federal; Kidnapping; Mississippi; Capital murder Sexual battery (2 counts); Florida; First degree murder Aggravated battery
- Penalty: Federal; Life imprisonment Mississippi; Death; Florida; Life imprisonment

Details
- Victims: 3–70+
- Span of crimes: 1985–1991
- Country: United States
- States: Florida, Mississippi, and possibly other states
- Date apprehended: August 5, 1991

Donald Leroy Evans (July 5, 1957 – January 5, 1999) was an American serial killer and Neo-Nazi who murdered at least three people from 1985 to 1991. He was known for confessing to killing victims at parks and rest areas across more than twenty U.S. states.

== Crimes ==
Born in Michigan, Evans was convicted of his first crime in Galveston, Texas, for the rape of a local woman in 1986. He was sentenced to fifteen years in prison, but served only five. After his parole in 1991, he returned to Galveston and took work as a desk clerk in a motel, but was discharged after parole officials "objected to a convicted sex offender working in a motel setting."

He eventually faced a new arrest warrant when a former girlfriend filed a complaint to police about threats of violence. Evans stayed ahead of law enforcement officials briefly by stealing a car and fleeing to Mississippi. He tried to remain inconspicuous in the Gulfport area, but soon committed the crime for which he would receive the death penalty: the rape and murder of 10-year-old Beatrice Louise Routh on August 1, 1991.

Evans seized the homeless girl from a Gulfport park and sexually assaulted her, before strangling her to death and dumping her corpse in a rural area. At trial, the medical examiner testified that the girl "was conscious, and could feel pain" throughout her day-long ordeal. Evans was arrested while he was employed on a fishing boat for the murder, confessed to abducting the girl, and was remanded to a federal prison in Colorado on kidnapping charges. On August 16, 1993, a jury trial in Mississippi convicted Evans of sexual battery and murder. Three days later, the jury sentenced him to death.

== Incarceration and death ==
While in custody, Evans claimed responsibility for killing more than 70 other people in 22 states. Most of the murders and rapes were committed at rest stops and public parks. The authorities were originally skeptical of Evans's claims, but two of his descriptions were perfect matches to unsolved cases across Florida. In 1995, Evans pleaded guilty to the 1985 strangulation death of Ira Jean Smith in exchange for a life sentence.

Evans successfully escaped the Harrison County Jail in June 1993 but was recaptured a short time later, hiding in a shed. He was stabbed to death in 1999 by fellow death row inmate Jimmie Mack at the Mississippi State Penitentiary while in the shower. Mack was originally sent to death row for the 1990 murder of Henry Fulton in Bolivar County. According to the Mississippi Department of Corrections, Mack was convicted of manslaughter for the attack and was sentenced to 20 years in prison. However, his original death sentence was commuted to life in prison in 2006 after a judge ruled that he was intellectually disabled.

== Known victims ==
- Ira Jean Smith (female, 38, March 7, 1985)
- Janet Marie Movich (female, 38, April 14, 1985)
- Beatrice Louise Routh (female, 10, August 1, 1991)

== See also ==
- List of serial killers in the United States
