= Malcolm Evans (cartoonist) =

New Zealand cartoonist

Malcolm Paul Evans (born 20 December 1945) is a New Zealand cartoonist residing in Auckland.

Up until September 2014, Evans' cartoons appeared daily in three major New Zealand newspapers, The Manawatu Standard, The Timaru Herald and The Christchurch Press. Evans still produces political cartoons for the Northland Age and still produces his Edna character, the ubiquitous farmer's wife, which has been running fortnightly since 1976 in New Zealand's largest farming newspaper Rural News. Evans also produces cartoons fortnightly for New Zealand Dairy News and Dairy News Australia, personal cartoon caricature commissions, and also sculpts and paints.

Having first worked for The New Zealand Herald in the 1970s, when he succeeded Sir Gordon Minhinnick, Evans was again its cartoonist for six years from 1997 until 2003 when those opposed to his pro-Palestinian cartoons, put pressure on the paper and, following Evans' subsequent refusal to stop drawing cartoon comments on Israeli treatment of Palestinians, he was subsequently fired. During his time at the New Zealand Herald he was twice judged New Zealand Cartoonist of the Year, a title he held at the time of his firing, along with that of President of the NZCIA - the New Zealand Cartoonists and Illustrators Association.

== See also ==
- Political cartoons
