= Steve Evans (writer) =

American journalist

Stephen Burgess Evans (born April 1, 1963, in Charlottesville, Virginia) is an American investigative journalist, author, communications professional and film historian. A Poynter Institute for Media Studies Fellow, Evans has received first place awards for feature writing from the Virginia Press Association and Tennessee Press Association. He has also received numerous awards from the Council for Advancement and Support of Education (CASE) for excellence in academic writing and publishing in higher education. His writing and photography have appeared in more than 50 print publications, including The Wall Street Journal, the Los Angeles Times, The Richmond Times-Dispatch, the Miami Herald and The Washington Post, as well as scores of online publications. Evans' film commentary appears on DVDVerdict.com, RottenTomatoes.com, CinemaUprising.blogspot.com, IMDb.com, and has been featured on The Criterion Collection homepage, among many other online sites devoted to film appreciation and cinema history.

He is a graduate of the University of Virginia master's degree program for studies in classical rhetoric and communication theory. During his time at UVA he received the departmental award for outstanding teaching in his work with undergraduates. Evans received a bachelor's degree with honors in journalism and political science from Virginia Commonwealth University.

His journalism focuses on business & finance, international stock markets and the myriad, endlessly creative schemes people concoct to multiply their coin. His business reporting appears regularly on Yahoo Finance, MSN Money, Morningstar, Benzinga and other market facing sites.

As a movie writer and film historian, Evans has published more than 6,500 detailed reviews of motion pictures produced in virtually every country with a film industry. An international readership follows his website celebrating classic, obscure and contemporary cinema, as well as film history. Evans' writing and research on world cinema focus on a richer appreciation of life as viewed through the prism of different cultures that use film as a medium for artistic expression.

Google has indexed every post on his film blog, and Evans' work is widely referenced in other major search engines including Yahoo and Bing.

His new screenplay, "Monet for Nothing," centers on an international art heist by an American expatriate couple on the lam in Paris — running from Interpol, the mafia and a cabal of obnoxious, oddball in-laws.

== Awards ==
- Poynter Institute, Fellow, Narrative Non-Fiction Writing, 1997.
- Virginia Press Association, First Place Feature Writing, 1998.
- Tennessee Press Association, First Place Feature Writing, 1999.
- CASE award for outstanding academic magazine, 2006, 2007, 2008.
