= William Evans =

William Evans may refer to:

== Arts and entertainment ==
- William Evans (watercolourist) (1798–1877), English watercolour painter born in Eton
- William Evans (landscape painter) (1809–1858), William Evans of Bristol
- William T. Evans (1843–1918), American art collector
- William Evans (Wil Ifan) (1883–1968), Welsh poet and Archdruid
- William John Evans (1866–1947), Welsh musician and composer
- Yusef Lateef (1920–2013), a.k.a. William Evans, American musician
- Dave Evans (bluegrass) (William Evans, 1950–2017), bluegrass musician
- Bill Evans (William John Evans, 1929–1980), American jazz pianist and composer
- Bill Evans (saxophonist) (William D. Evans, born 1958), jazz saxophonist
- Bill Evans (bluegrass) (William G. Evans, born 1956), banjo player, author, and teacher

== Politics, law, and military ==
- William Evans (British Army officer), British Army officer during the War of Spanish Succession
- William David Evans (1767–1821), English lawyer
- William Evans (1788–1856), British MP for North Derbyshire
- William F. Evans (1799–1865), Texan politician
- Sir William Evans, 1st Baronet (1821–1892), British Liberal politician and benefactor
- William Evans (Pennsylvania politician) (1831–1905), American politician from Pennsylvania
- William Henry Evans (1842–1923), Wisconsin legislator
- William Evans (judge) (1846/7–1918), Welsh judge and legal author
- William D. Evans (1852–1936), jurist in the state of Iowa
- William Evans (Medal of Honor) (1853–1893), American Indian Wars soldier
- William Evans (Australian politician) (1856–1914), Australian union leader and politician
- William Sanford Evans (1869–1950), Manitoba politician
- William E. Evans (politician) (1877–1959), U.S. Congressman from California
- William S. Evans (1884–1984), Lithuanian-born Jewish-American lawyer, politician, and judge
- William Wadsworth Evans (1886–1972), politician in the New Jersey General Assembly
- William Evans (trade unionist) (1899–1983), British trade union leader
- William W. Evans Jr. (1921–1999), American politician in the New Jersey General Assembly
- William J. Evans (general) (1924–2000), United States Air Force general
- William T. Evans (politician) (1925–1991), American politician and judge
- William Andrew Evans (born 1939), British general

== Religion ==
- William Evans (divine) (died 1720), Welsh Presbyterian divine
- William Evans (lexicographer) (died 1776), Welsh minister and lexicographer
- William Evans (priest) (1801–1869), English divine and naturalist

== Science ==
- William Evans (ornithologist) (1851–1922), Scottish naturalist, ornithologist and actuary
- William Percival Evans (1864–1959), New Zealand chemistry academic
- William Harry Evans (1876–1956), lepidopterist
- William Evans (cardiologist) (1895–1988), Welsh cardiologist and publisher
- William Evans, Baron Energlyn (1912–1985), Welsh geologist and life peer
- William J. Evans (chemist), American chemist
- William Frederick Evans (1813–1867), Victorian era British entomologist
- William E. Evans (pharmacist), American pharmacist and researcher
- William Eugene Evans (1930–2010), marine mammal acoustician and ecologist
- William Charles Evans (1911–1988), biochemist

== Sports ==
=== Association football ===
- Bill Evans (footballer, born 1873) (1873-1961), English footballer, see List of Bury F.C. players (1–24 appearances)
- William Evans (footballer) (1853–1919), Welsh international football defender
- Will Evans (footballer, born 1991), English football defender
- Will Evans (footballer, born 1997), Welsh football forward
- Billy Evans (footballer, born 1921) (William Emmanuel Evans, 1921–1960), English footballer
- Willie Evans (footballer, born 1912) (William Evans, 1912–1976), Welsh international footballer

=== Baseball ===
- William Evans (baseball), Negro league baseball player
- Bill Evans (1910s pitcher) (William James Evans, 1893–1946), played for the Pirates
- Bill Evans (1940s pitcher) (William Lawrence Evans, 1919–1983), played for the Red Sox and White Sox
- Bill Evans (outfielder) (William Demont Evans, 1899–1986)
- Billy Evans (William George Evans, 1884–1956), American umpire in Major League Baseball

=== Basketball ===
- Bill Evans (basketball coach) (William LaVar Evans, born 1948), college men's basketball coach
- Billy Evans (basketball, born 1932) (William Best Evans, 1932–2020), American member of the 1956 gold medal-winning Olympic team
- Billy Evans (basketball, born 1947) (William D. Evans, born 1947), American basketball player who played at Boston College and then in the ABA

=== Cricket ===
- William Evans (cricketer, born 1883) (1883–1913), South African-born English all-round cricketer
- William Evans (cricketer, born 1897) (1897–1966), English first-class cricketer and civil servant

=== Rugby union ===
- William Evans (Australian sportsman) (1876–1964), Queensland cricketer and rugby union player
- William Evans (rugby, born 1883) (1883–1946), Welsh international rugby union player
- William Evans (rugby union, born 1892) (1892–1979), Welsh rugby union player
- Will Evans (rugby union) (born 1997), English rugby union flanker
- Bill Evans (rugby union) (William Frederick Evans, 1857–1935), Welsh rugby union international

=== Other sports ===
- William W. Evans (1908–1963), American lacrosse player
- Will Evans (rugby league) (William Evans, born 2001), Wales international rugby league player

== Other ==
- William Davies Evans (1790–1872), Welsh chess player
- William Gray Evans (1855–1911), president of the Denver Tramway Company
- William B. Evans (born 1959), commissioner of the Boston Police Department, 2014–2018
- William Evans (police officer) (1980–2021), United States Capitol Police officer killed in vehicular assault on Capitol
- William Evans, a character in the 2007 film 3:10 to Yuma, played by Logan Lerman
- Bill Evans (meteorologist) (William Howard Evans, born 1960), American meteorologist
- Will Evans (comedian) (William Edward Evans, 1866–1931), English comedian, music hall performer, and maker of silent films

== See also ==
- Willie Evans (disambiguation)
- Bill Evans (disambiguation)
- Billy Evans (disambiguation)
- Will Evans (disambiguation)
- List of people with surname Evans
