= Will Evans =

Will Evans may refer to:

- Will Evans (footballer, born 1991), English football defender
- Will Evans (footballer, born 1997), Welsh footballer
- Will Evans (rugby union) (born 1997), English rugby union flanker
- Will Evans (rugby league) (born 2001), Wales international rugby league footballer
- Will Evans (comedian) (1866–1931), English comedian, music hall performer, and maker of silent films
- Will Evans (publisher) (born 1983–1984), American publisher

== See also ==
- William Evans (disambiguation)
