= David C. Jones =

9th Chairman of the Joint Chiefs of Staff

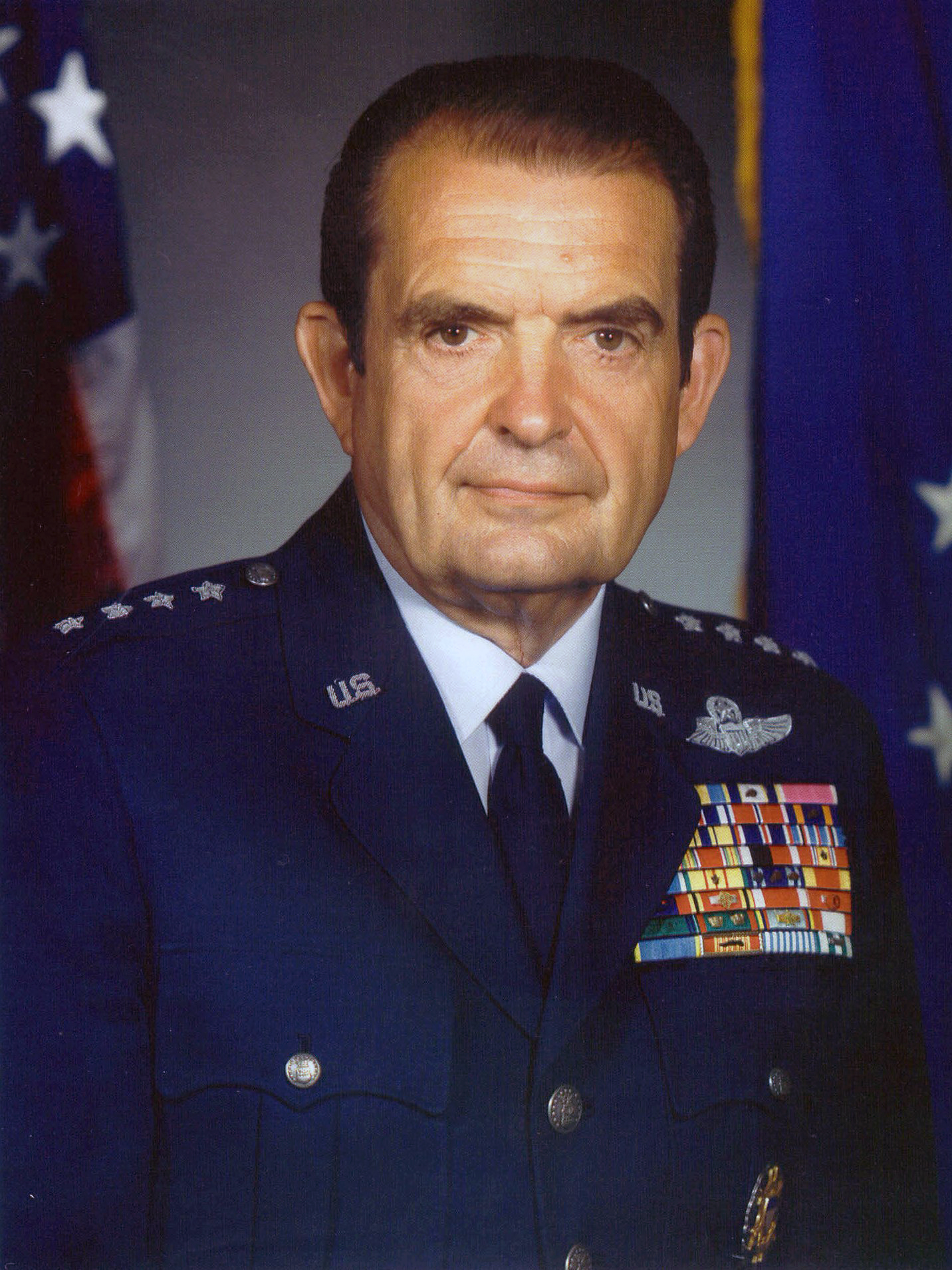
- Official portrait, 1978
- Born: July 9, 1921; Aberdeen, South Dakota, U.S.
- Died: August 10, 2013 (aged 92); Potomac Falls, Virginia, U.S.
- Spouse: Lois Tarbell (m. 1942; died 2009)
- Children: 3
- Military career
- Allegiance: United States
- Branch: United States Air Force
- Service years: 1943–1982
- Rank: General
- Commands: Chairman of the Joint Chiefs of Staff; Chief of Staff of the United States Air Force; United States Air Forces Europe; Fourth Allied Tactical Air Force; Second Air Force; 33rd Tactical Fighter Wing; 33rd Bombardment Squadron; 22nd Air Refueling Squadron; 19th Bombardment Squadron
- Conflicts: World War II; Korean War; Vietnam War
- Awards: Defense Distinguished Service Medal (3); Air Force Distinguished Service Medal (2); Army Distinguished Service Medal; Navy Distinguished Service Medal; Legion of Merit; Distinguished Flying Cross; Bronze Star Medal

David Charles Jones (July 9, 1921 – August 10, 2013) was a United States Air Force general and the ninth chairman of the Joint Chiefs of Staff. In this capacity, Jones served as the highest-ranking uniformed officer of the United States Armed Forces. He previously served as the ninth Chief of Staff of the United States Air Force and fifteenth commander of the United States Air Forces in Europe.

Jones is best known for his efforts to cement the chairman of the Joint Chiefs of Staff as the principal military advisor to the President, as opposed to being a "first among equals" of the Joint Chiefs of Staff. Following his retirement from active duty in 1982, he continued to emphasize the importance of such reform, which contributed to the passage of Goldwater-Nichols Act.

== Early life ==
Born in Aberdeen, South Dakota, and raised in Minot, North Dakota, Jones graduated from Minot High School and attended both the University of North Dakota in Grand Forks and Minot State Teacher's College. While attending college, he received his private pilot license from the Civilian Pilot Training Program. In April 1942, he left college to join the United States Army Air Forces.

== Military career ==
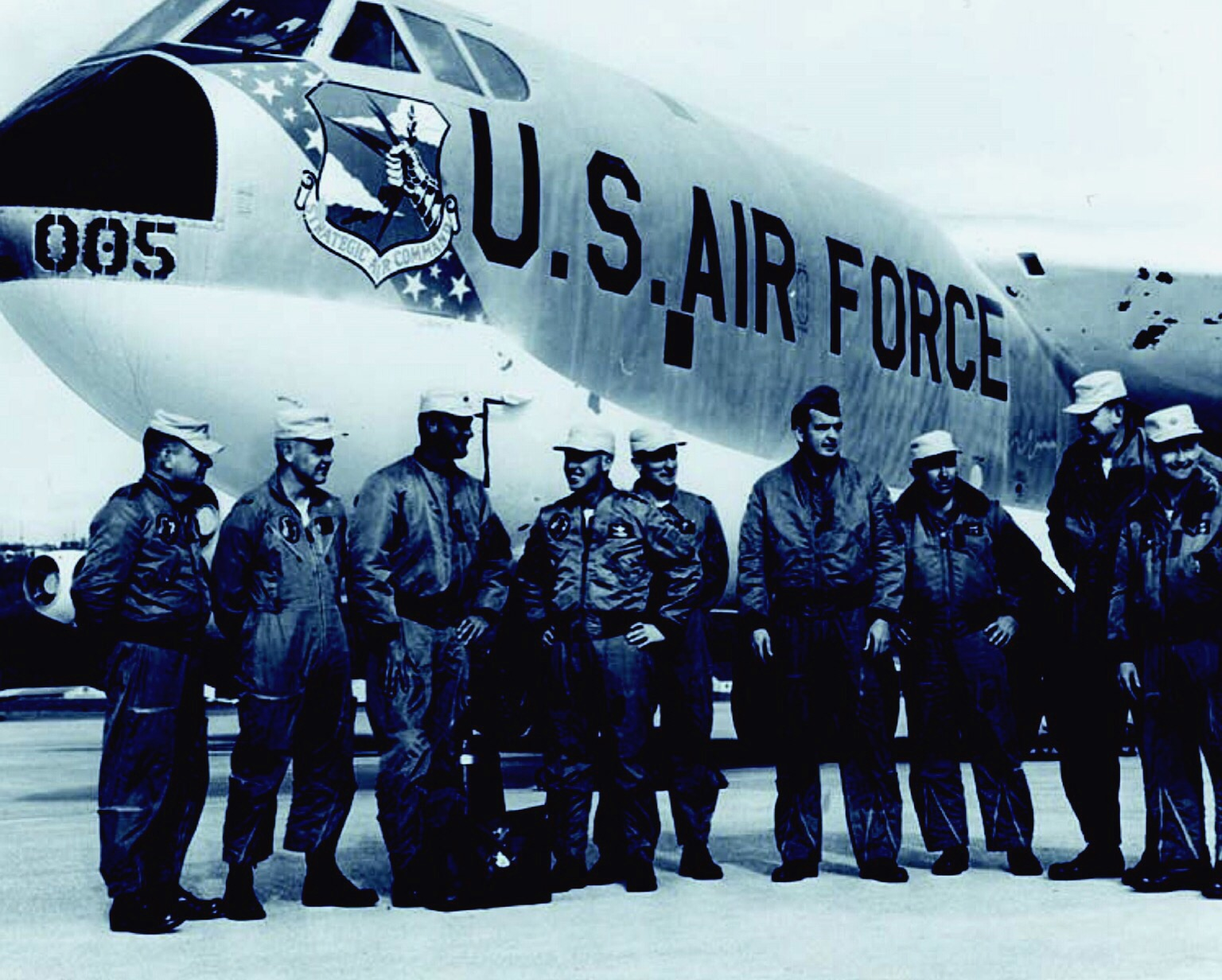
Colonel David C. Jones (fourth from right) at Barksdale Air Force Base, Louisiana while serving at the Strategic Air Command in January 1957.

In February 1943, Jones graduated from Roswell Army Airfield flight school in New Mexico, received his pilot wings, and was commissioned a second lieutenant in the United States Army Air Forces. After serving as a flying instructor in New Mexico, Arizona and Texas, Jones was assigned to the 3rd Emergency Rescue Squadron of the Fifth Air Force in Japan in 1945. He began as a unit pilot, flying Catalina flying boats, and rose to command the squadron.

From 1948 to 1949 Jones was a unit instructor and then assistant operations and training officer with the 2236th Air Force Reserve Training Center, Godman Field, Kentucky. Also during this period, he attended specialized professional military training courses.

Jones was assigned to the 19th Bombardment Squadron at March AFB, California, in January 1950. During his years with the 19th, he rose to aircraft commander, then operations officer and finally commander of the squadron. He flew more than 300 hours on combat missions over North Korea, when the squadron was one of the first bombardment units committed to the Korean War. In May 1953 he transitioned from bombers to tankers, taking command of the 22nd Air Refueling Squadron at March. Promoted to lieutenant colonel in June 1953, he remained at March but returned to bombers the following year as commander of the 33rd Bombardment Squadron.

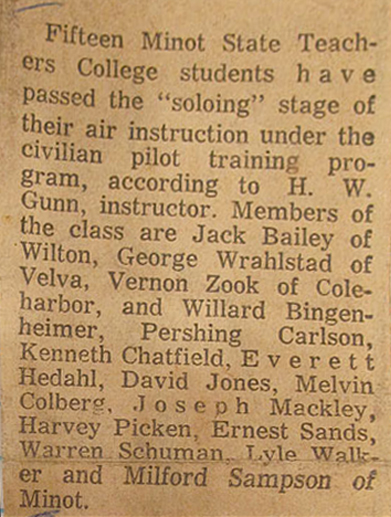
CPTP Students Solo 1940

Jones next served at Headquarters Strategic Air Command (SAC), Offutt AFB, Nebraska, during SAC's build-up period. He was assigned initially in September 1954 as an operations planner in the bomber mission branch and remained there until January 1955, when General Curtis LeMay selected him as his aide. Promoted to colonel in April 1957, Jones became director of materiel and later deputy commander for maintenance of SAC's 93rd Bombardment Wing at Castle AFB, California.

Jones was a 1960 graduate of the National War College. Following that, Jones was assigned to the Air Staff's operations directorate for four years. As chief of the manned systems branch, he worked on the B-70 bomber project. He then served as deputy chief and chief of the Strategic Division. After F-100 and F-4 training, Jones assumed command of the 33rd Tactical Fighter Wing, Eglin AFB, Florida, at its activation in 1965 and bought it to operational status.

Jones then served in key staff assignments with United States Air Forces in Europe. He received his second star in November 1967. In February 1969 Jones was assigned to Headquarters Seventh Air Force, Tan Son Nhut Airfield, Vietnam, as deputy chief of staff for operations and became vice commander in June. Promoted to lieutenant general, he returned to SAC in August 1969 as commander of the Second Air Force, headquartered at Barksdale AFB, Louisiana.

In April 1971, Jones returned to United States Air Forces in Europe (USAFE) as vice commander in chief. He assumed command of USAFE and the Fourth Allied Tactical Air Force in August and was promoted to general in September. In his North Atlantic Treaty Organization (NATO) capacity as commander of the Fourth Allied Tactical Air Force, Jones directed an international planning team that integrated central region air forces into a more cohesive organization. Key to that effort was his creation of a small operational and planning headquarters, Allied Air Force, Central Europe.

== United States Air Force Chief of Staff ==
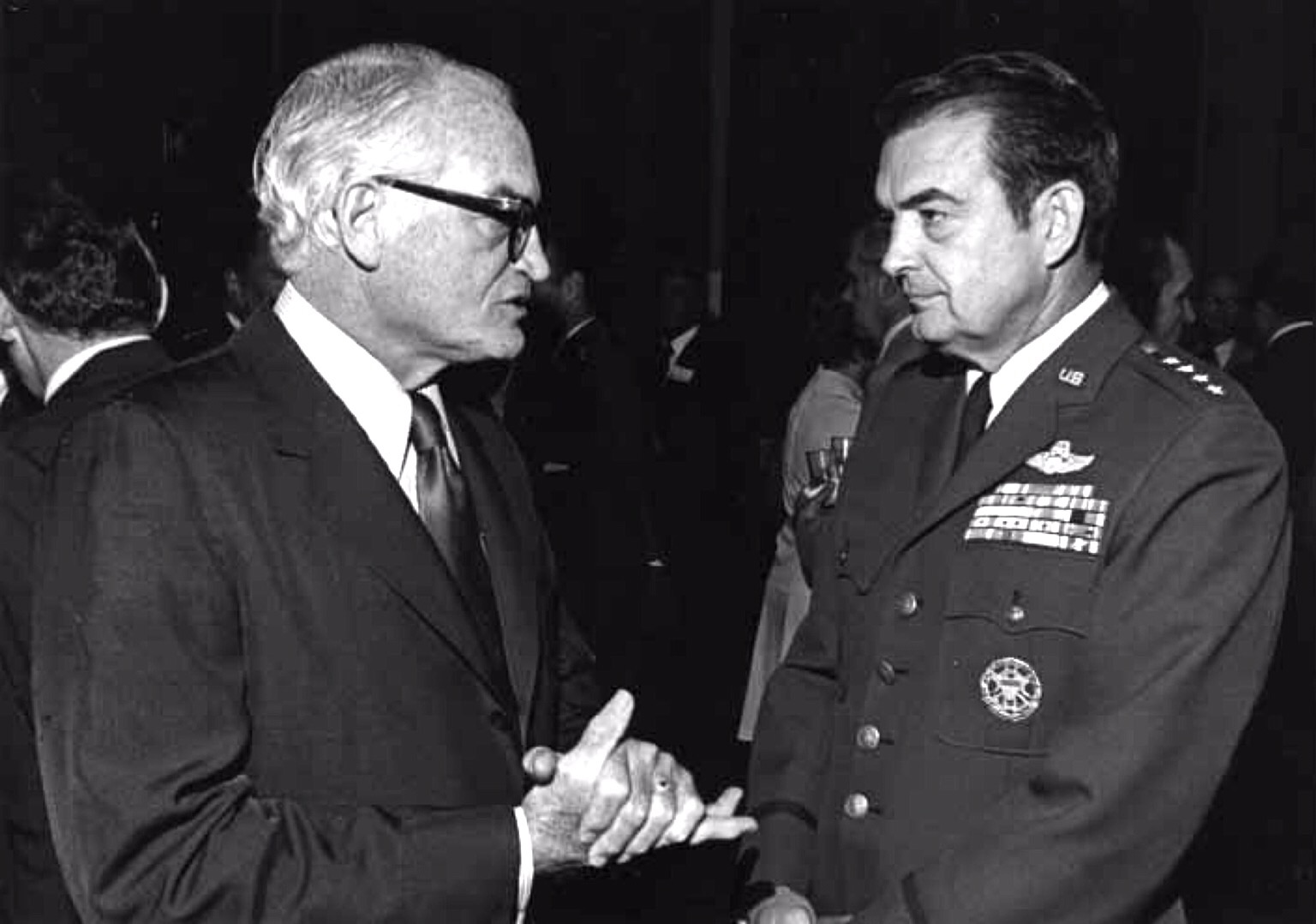
Air Force Chief of Staff General David C. Jones with U.S. Senator Barry Goldwater

Capping a career that had included operational and command positions in bomber, tanker, training and tactical fighter units as well as headquarters staff positions, General Jones was nominated by President Richard Nixon as the ninth Chief of Staff of The United States Air Force in July 1974, following the appointment of General George S. Brown as the eighth Chairman of The Joint Chiefs of Staff. As Chief of Staff of The United States Air Force, General Jones responsible for administering, training and equipping all of the airmen employing in the world's largest Air Force. During his tenure as Air Force Chief of Staff General Jones also advocated for the development of high-technology of future weapons systems and also reorganized the Air Force command structure. He supported modernization with such systems as the F-15, F-16, the A–10, and the E–3A.

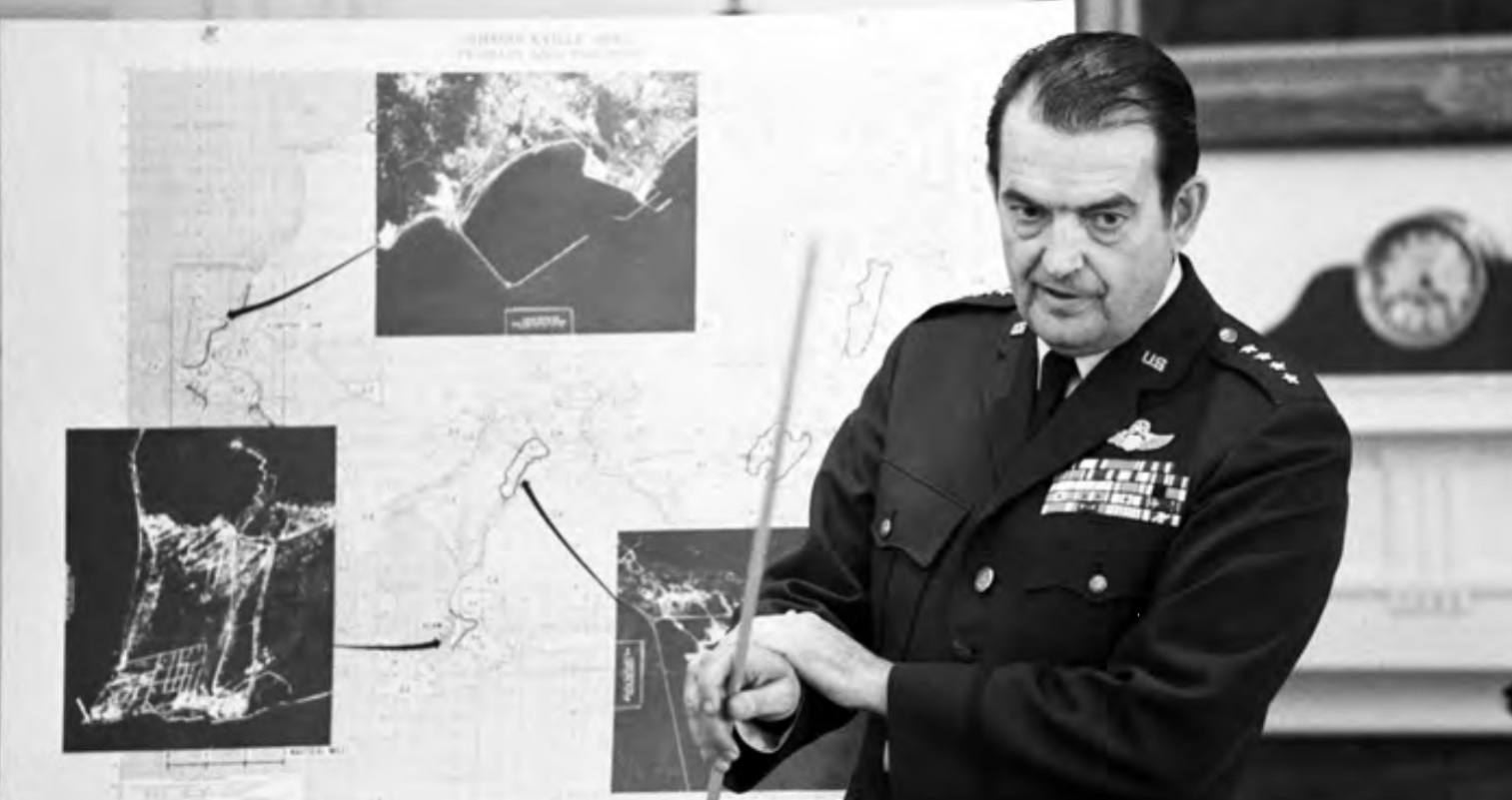
General David C. Jones briefed the National Security Council at the White House, during The Mayaguez Incident on May 12, 1975.

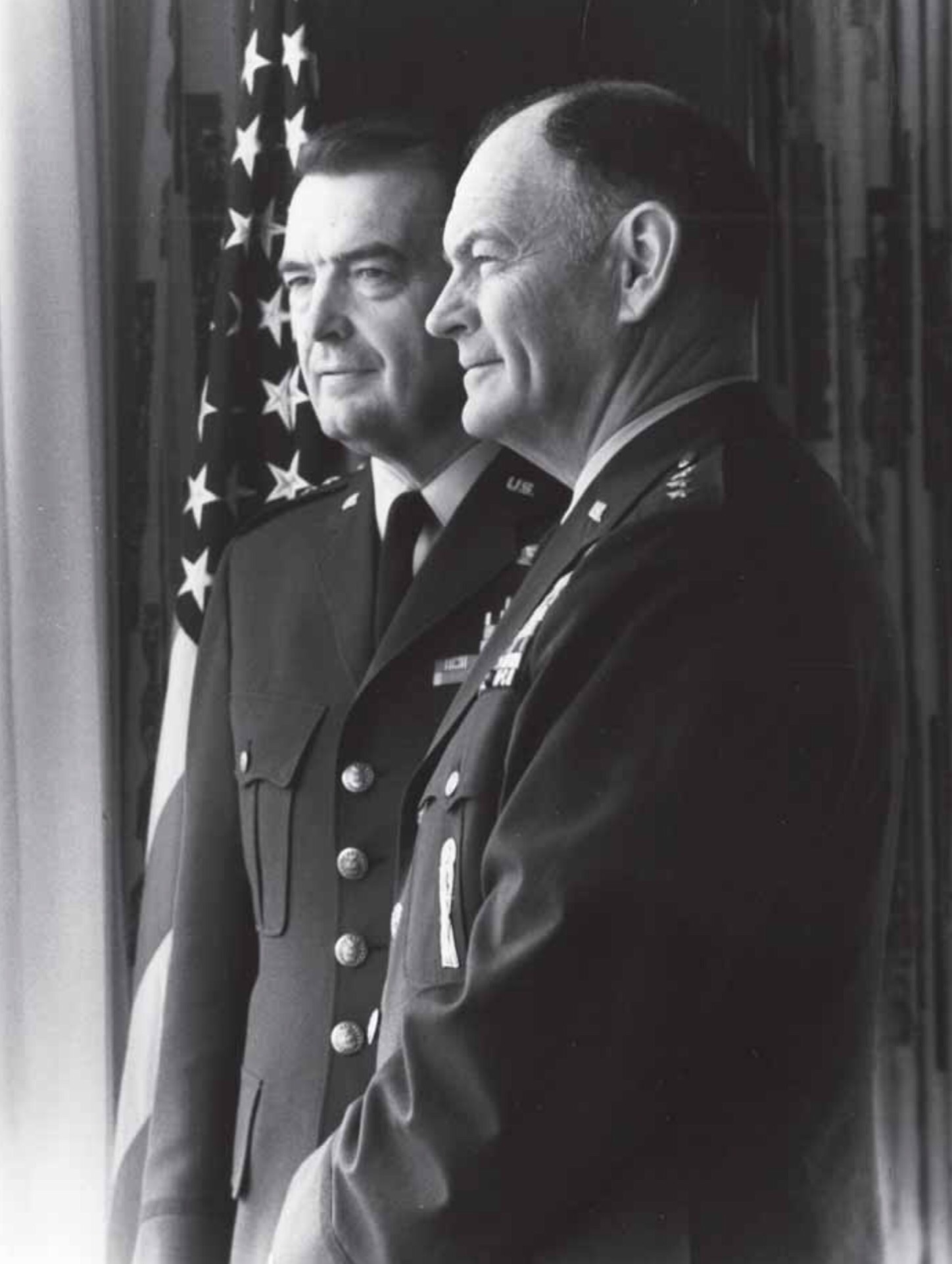
United States Air Force Chief of Staff General David C. Jones with Chairman of The Joint Chiefs of Staff General George S. Brown at The White House, in 1977.

General Jones emphasized the needs of modernizing the Air Force following the end of the Vietnam War and in order to stop a potential Soviet armored thrust. As a result, the Fairchild A-10 Warthog aircraft was built to become the primary survivable tank killer. That program was followed by the General Dynamics EF-111 to counter Soviet air mobile defenses, along with the Boeing E-3 Sentry AWACS, which served to provide picture and detail of the airborne battlefield. Much of the modernization program was focused on the European area, where the United States developed initiatives in response to Department of Defense and congressional interest for an increase in the capability of NATO.

During his tenure as Air Force Chief of Staff General Jones also oversaw the improvements in the working relationship between the Air Force, Army and Navy. General Jones also developed an emerging concepts of air and ground integration that would eventually result in the Air-Land Battle Doctrine. The concepts and the battle doctrine was developed in order to oppose the growing Soviet conventional threat within the Central Europe. In May 1975 following a cable from United States Embassy in Jakarta, Indonesia which informed an SOS and Mayday signals from a U.S. merchant vessel SS Mayaguez that has been attacked and seized by Khmer Rouge militia following their took control of Cambodian Capital Phnom Penh; this event lead to a military crisis known as the Mayaguez incident. During the incident, General Jones served as the acting Chairman of The Joint Chiefs of Staff due to the fact that Chairman Gen. George S. Brown was in Europe for a NATO Summit at that time of the Mayaguez Incident. General Jones advised President Gerald Ford, Secretary of Defense James Schlesinger and the National Security Council on a range of military options, including the plan for military operations to rescue the crew of SS Mayaguez. The United States initially launch a rescue operation, by deploying U.S. Marines to recaptured the SS Mayaguez and also attacked the island of Koh Tang, on which it was believed the crew of the SS Mayaguez was held imprisonment by the Khmer Rouge. The crew of the SS Mayaguez was finally rescued, however General Jones saw a complex communication and relationship between the military and the civilian officials during the Mayaguez Incident. The Mayaguez crisis was the one that eventually convinced General Jones of the need for change within the military and civilian relationship, especially during a military crisis and wartime situation. This became a crucial factor in the enactment of the 1986 Goldwater-Nichols Act. On May 31, 1978, Jones was awarded the Order of the Sword, the Air Force enlisted force's highest honor for officer leadership.

== Chairman of the Joint Chiefs of Staff ==
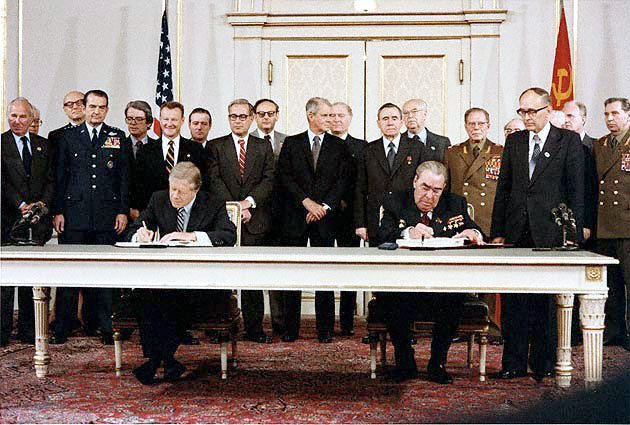
Chairman of The Joint Chiefs of Staff General David C. Jones (in Air Force uniform) accompanying President Jimmy Carter at the signing of the SALT II treaty, 18 June 1979, in Vienna.

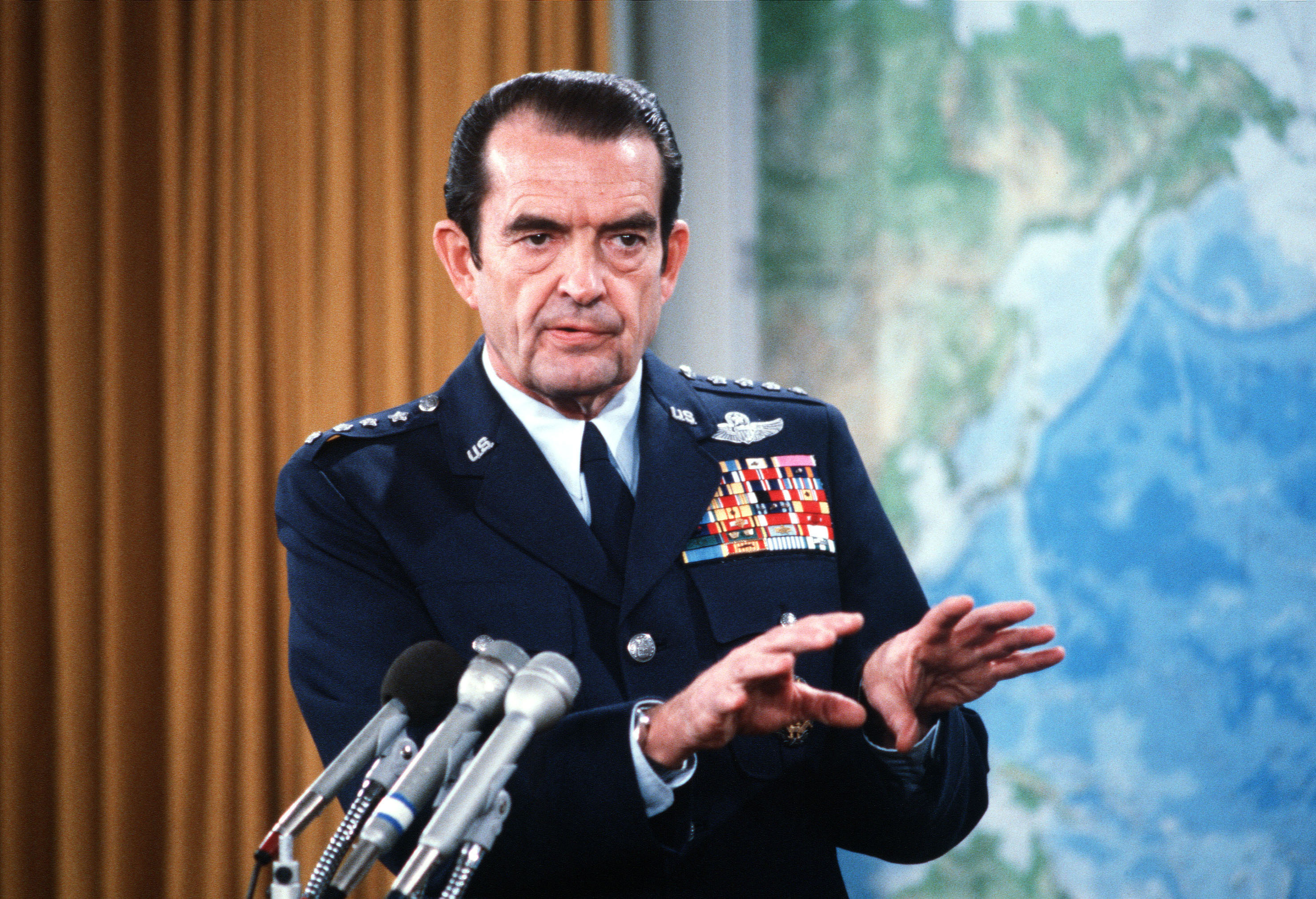
Chairman of the Joint Chiefs of Staff General David C. Jones during a press briefing in The Pentagon.

General David C. Jones was nominated by President Jimmy Carter to become Chairman of the Joint Chiefs of Staff on 21 June 1978, replacing General George S. Brown, who retired due to ill health. General Jones became the only Chairman of the Joint Chiefs of Staff who was not a graduate from either a college or service academy. General Jones became the Chairman of the Joint Chiefs of Staff during a period of increasing of the Soviet military arsenal and the emerging of Muslim militias within the Persian Gulf region that was deemed as a threat within the Western world nations. General Jones also oversaw the increased funding for defense in response to the Soviet threat and due to the continuing Joint Chiefs of Staff advocacy of strategic force modernization.

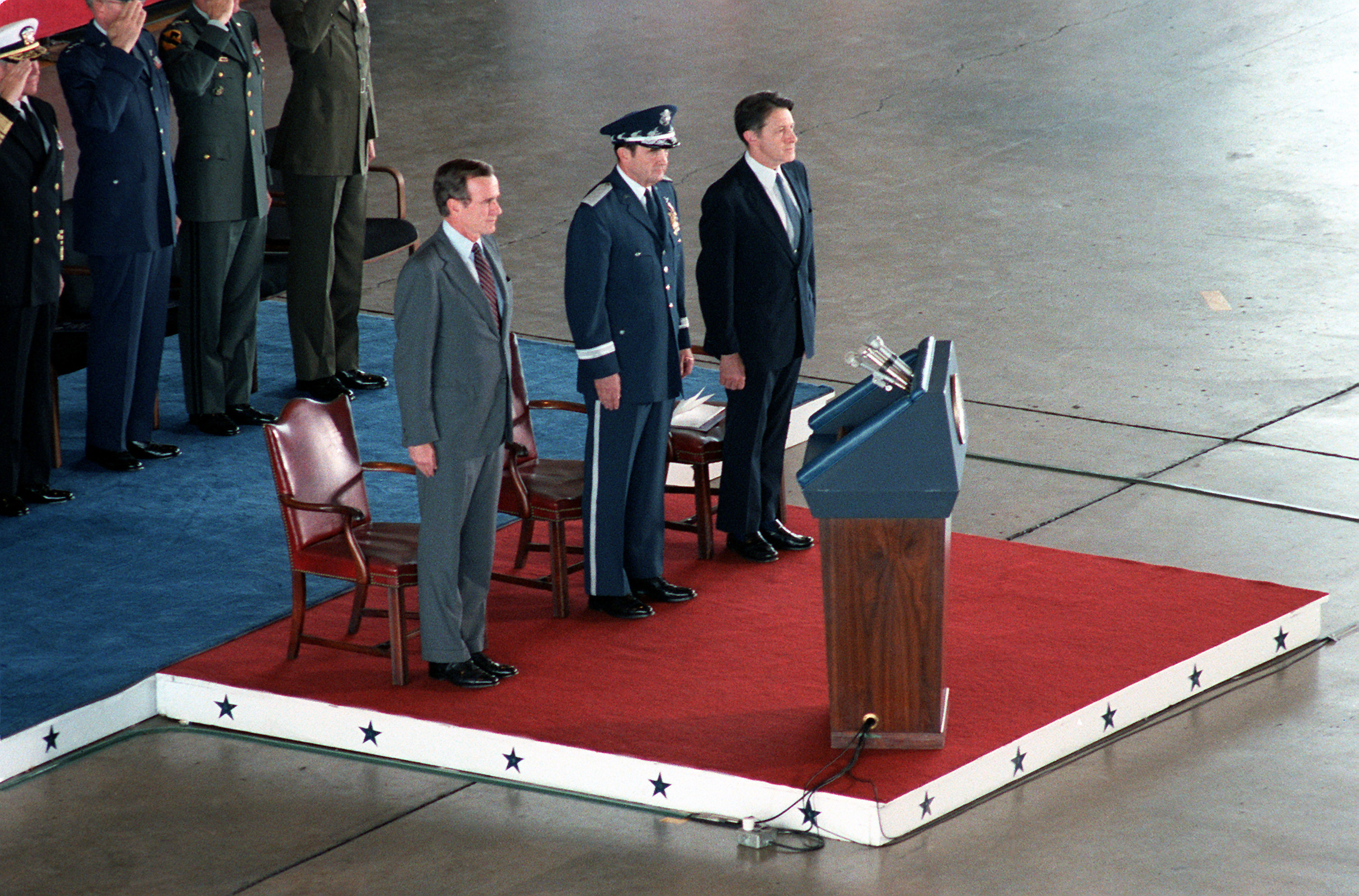
Chairman of the Joint Chiefs of Staff General David C. Jones with U.S. Vice President George H. W. Bush and Secretary of Defense Caspar Weinberger at Andrews Air Force Base.

Jones accompanied President Jimmy Carter to Vienna, Austria, in June 1979 for the final stage of the Strategic Arms Limitation Treaty II negotiations with the USSR. When the Soviet invasion of Afghanistan raised fears that Soviet forces there might move into neighboring Iran, where an anti-Western militant Islamic regime had taken power in early 1979, Carter created a rapid deployment force for Southwest Asia to counter any such attempt in the region. Subsequently, at the direction of the secretary of defense, Jones oversaw planning for the transformation of the Rapid Defense Force into a regional unified command. The planning for what in 1983 became the United States Central Command (USCENTCOM) was essentially completed during his chairmanship. Jones also oversaw the planning for the rescue of the U.S. embassy personnel taken hostage in November 1979 by followers of the Iranian leader Ayatollah Khomeini, and he survived the criticism for that rescue mission's failure.

=== Goldwater-Nichols Act ===
During his second term as chairman, Jones worked to make the chairman, rather than the corporate JCS, the principal military adviser to the president and the secretary of defense, arguing that such a change of the National Security Act would improve the quality and timeliness of military advice and the combined readiness and effectiveness of the nation's combat forces. Jones continued his efforts toward that goal after his retirement as chairman of the JCS and saw it come to fruition with the passage of the Goldwater-Nichols Department of Defense Reorganization Act in 1986.

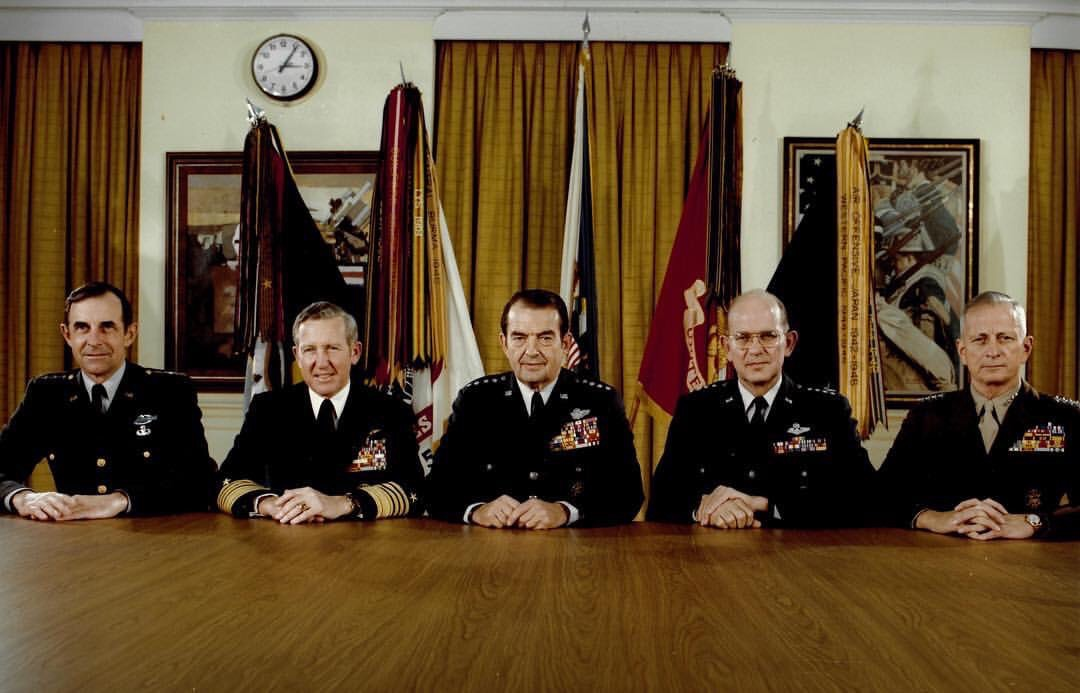
Chairman of the Joint Chiefs of Staff General David C. Jones with the other members of the Joint Chiefs of Staff at The Pentagon in 1981.

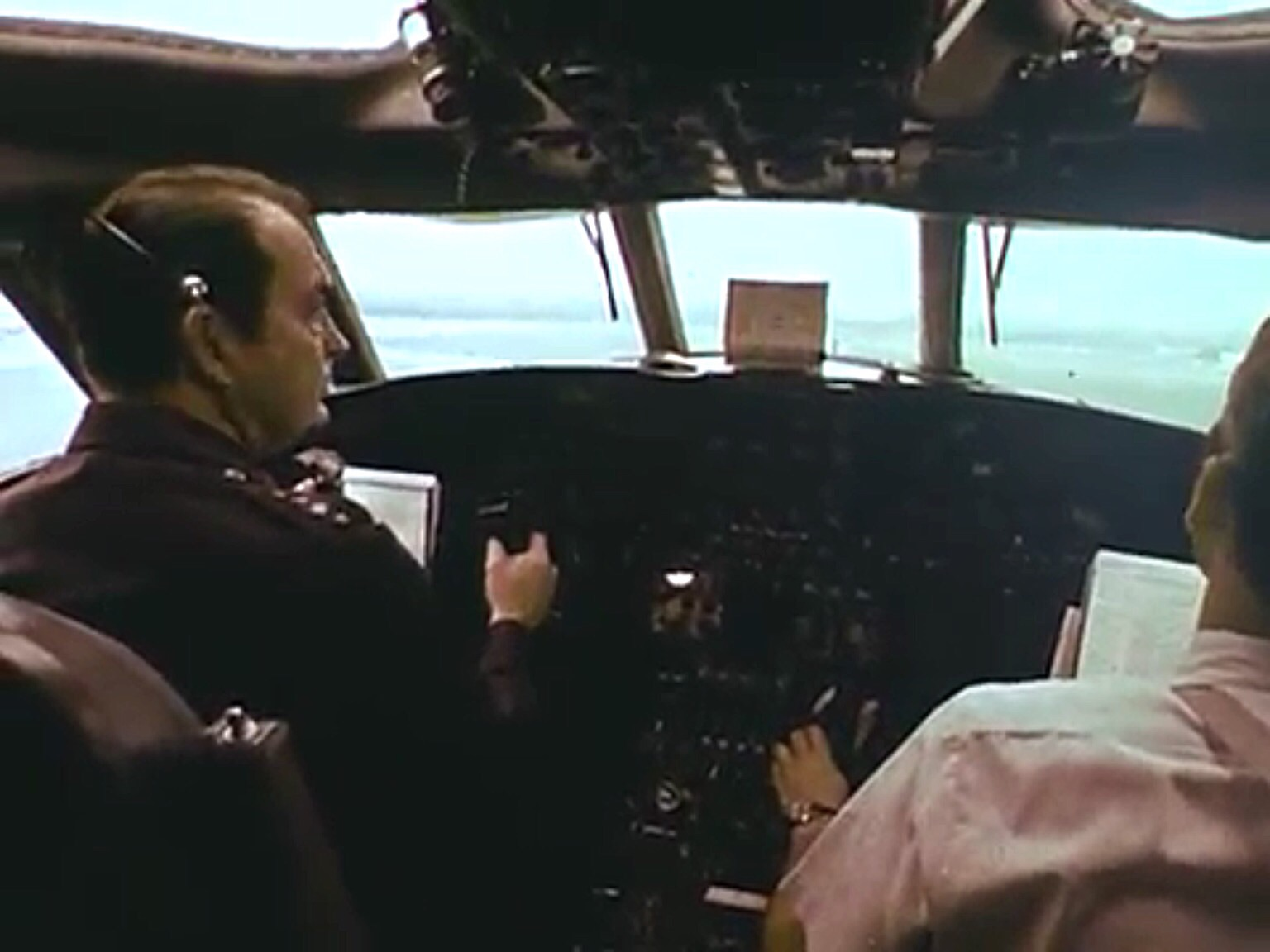
Chairman of the Joint Chiefs of Staff General David C. Jones piloting a United States Air Force Lockheed VC-140B JetStar.

Jones continued to serve as Chairman of the Joint Chiefs of Staff during the first years of Ronald Reagan's Presidency in 1981. He retired from active-duty within the United States Air Force after his second term period as Chairman of the Joint Chiefs of Staff finished on June 18, 1982. In 1989 military history book Four Stars: The Inside Story of The Forty-Year Battle Between The Joint Chiefs of Staff and America's Civilian Leaders, historian Mark Perry wrote that General David C. Jones had earned a reputation as "a good service manager" who "welcomed change" during his tenure as both U.S. Air Force Chief of Staff and Chairman of the Joint Chiefs of Staff.

Jones was awarded an honorary doctorate of humane letters degree from the University of Nebraska Omaha in 1974, an honorary doctorate of laws degree from Louisiana Tech University in 1975, and an honorary doctorate of humane letters degree from Minot State College in 1979. Jones received the Golden Plate Award of the American Academy of Achievement presented by Awards Council member Roger Staubach in 1979. Jones was the final Chairman of the Joint Chiefs of Staff to be decorated for service in World War II, Korea, and Vietnam.

Jones was a member of the Air Force Association, the Falcon Foundation, the Council on Foreign Relations, the Alfalfa Club, the Bohemian Club and the Family.

== Personal life and death ==
In 1942, he married Lois Tarbell (1921–2009). They had three children, two daughters Susan and Kathy; and a son, David Curtis.

Jones died August 10, 2013, at a military retirement community in Potomac Falls, Virginia at age 92. He had Parkinson's disease. Jones was buried in Arlington National Cemetery on October 25, 2013.

== Dates of rank ==
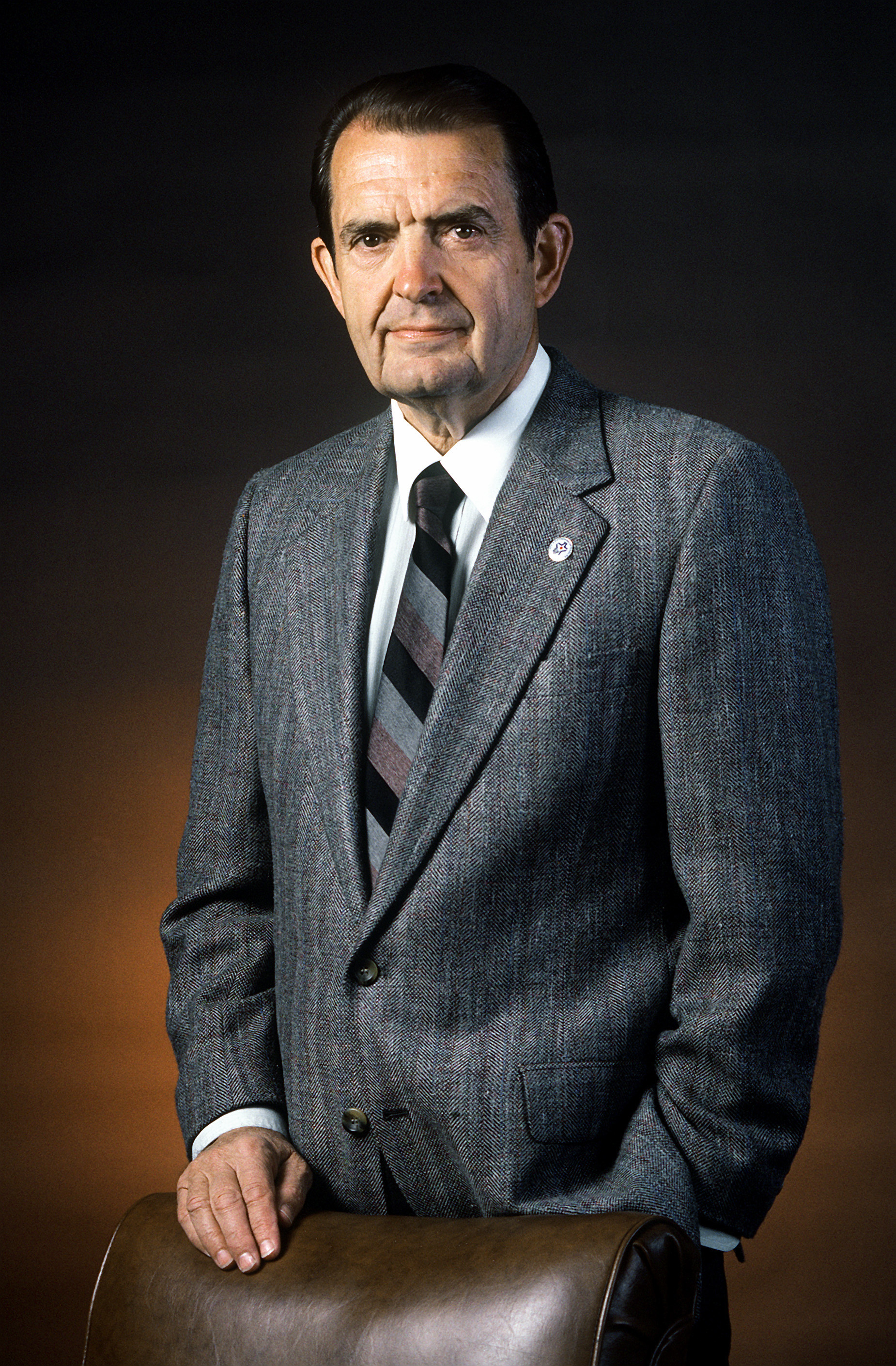
Jones in 1986

| Insignia | Rank | Date |
|---|---|---|
| | Second Lieutenant | February 6, 1943 |
| | First Lieutenant | February 28, 1944 (permanent on February 6, 1946) |
| | Captain | April 11, 1946 (permanent on October 25, 1948) |
| | Major | February 5, 1951 (permanent on January 23, 1952) |
| | Lieutenant Colonel | June 1, 1953 (permanent on July 1, 1959) |
| | Colonel | April 23, 1957 (permanent on December 22, 1960) |
| | Brigadier General | December 1, 1965 (permanent on February 10, 1966) |
| | Major General | November 1, 1967 (permanent on January 24, 1969) |
| | Lieutenant General | August 1, 1969 |
| | General | September 1, 1971 |

== Awards and decorations ==
| US Air Force Command Pilot Badge |
| Office of the Joint Chiefs of Staff Identification Badge |

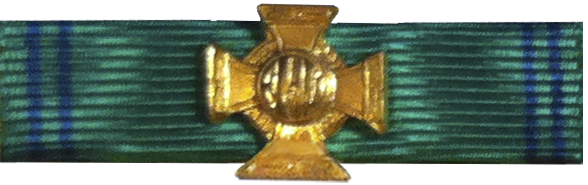
| Defense Distinguished Service Medal with two bronze oak leaf clusters |
| Air Force Distinguished Service Medal with one bronze oak leaf cluster |
| Army Distinguished Service Medal |
| Navy Distinguished Service Medal |
| Legion of Merit |
| Distinguished Flying Cross |
| Bronze Star Medal |
| Air Medal with oak leaf cluster |
| Air Force Commendation Medal |
| Air Force Outstanding Unit Award |
| American Campaign Medal |
| Asiatic-Pacific Campaign Medal |
| World War II Victory Medal |
| Army of Occupation Medal |
| National Defense Service Medal with one bronze service star |
| Korean Service Medal with two service stars |
| Vietnam Service Medal with service star |
| Air Force Longevity Service Award with silver and three bronze oak leaf clusters |
| Chinese Order of the Cloud and Banner, 1st Grade with Special Grand Cordon |
| National Order of Vietnam, Knight |
| Air Force Distinguished Service Order, 1st class (Vietnam) |
| Order of Merit of the Federal Republic of Germany, Knight Commander's Cross |
| Order of May of Aeronautical Merit, Knight (Argentina) |
| French Legion of Honour, Commander |
| Air Force Cross (Venezuela) |
| Order of Merit of the Italian Republic, Grand Officer |
| Air Force Cross of Aeronautical Merit, Grand Cross (Colombia) |
| Order of the Rising Sun, degree unknown (Japan) |
| Bolivian Order of Aeronautical Merit, Knight |
| Vietnam Gallantry Cross Unit Award |
| United Nations Korea Medal |
| Vietnam Campaign Medal |

== See also ==
- List of commanders of USAFE

Military offices
| Preceded by Gen. Joseph R. Holzapple | Commander of The United States Air Forces Europe; 1971 – 1974 | Succeeded by Gen. John W. Vogt Jr. |
| Preceded by Gen. George S. Brown | Chief of Staff of the United States Air Force; July 1, 1974 – June 20, 1978 | Succeeded by Gen. Lew Allen Jr. |
| Preceded by Gen. George S. Brown | Chairman of the Joint Chiefs of Staff; June 21, 1978 – June 18, 1982 | Succeeded by Gen. John William Vessey Jr. |
