= Ultramarins =

Ultramarins is a 2021 fantasy book by French author Mariette Navarro.

== Summary ==
A cargo ship crosses the Atlantic Ocean, captained by a strict, practical woman - the only woman aboard. In the middle of the ocean, the captain uncharacteristically allows several of the crew violate the usual shipboard regulations and take a swim in the waters. When the crew members climb back onto the ship after their swim, there are more of them than there were before...

== Publication history ==
The novel was originally published in French by Quidam éditeur on 19 August 2021. 5000 copies were printed for its first run, with the number of printed copies reaching 17 000 by late October 2021.

An English translation, titled Ultramarine, was published by the British Héloïse Press in 2023, translated by Canadian Cory Stockwell. An American English translation was published in 2025, by Franco-American Eve Hill-Agnus of Deep Vellum. It was Hill-Angus's first novel-length work of translation.

== Themes ==
Drew Broussard of Literary Hub has written that the novel examines "questions of hierarchy, gender, and isolation." Publishers Weekly noted that "Navarro explores the captain’s profound connection with her ship (evoking the myth of Iphigenia, the captain reflects, “What will we sacrifice, boat? What will we throw into the sea to make you come back to our side?”) and the complex gender dynamics aboard."

Fernanda Coutinho Teixeira of Strange Horizons has noted that the novel "embraces the notion of the open sea as almost a different dimension, a place where both sailors and captain must understand themselves as something beyond the confines of earthly concepts." Carr Harkrader of The Chicago Review of Books wrote that the novel's "setting in the barren sea frames the human impulses attempting to break through people who have been trained to ignore them."

In an interview with France Culture, Navarro stated that "I am obsessed with the notion of time... time spent aboard a ship makes the world disappear: there's no more network, no more of the flood of internet notifications, in the end, two weeks aboard a cargo ship is a like a retreat in a monastery."

== Reception ==
Publishers Weekly gave the novel a starred review, praising the "spellbinding prose that enhances the novel’s nightmarish atmosphere... This captivating saga lures and disturbs in equal measure." Annilee Newton of Asymptote wrote that the novel "feels like the work of a poet. It isn’t the kind of novel that hammers down linear plot points and works its way methodically through a narrative. Instead, the story roots itself in the perceptions of the characters and the almost gothic atmosphere," adding that "Navarro gives us an eerily beautiful portal into the submerged depths of our own interior worlds." Fernanda Coutinho Teixeira of Strange Horizons wrote that it was "an uncanny, introspective story" that was "a brief but memorable read that feels precise and intentional in its handling of its themes. In embracing its fluidity, the novella creates an immersive, emotional experience for a reader willing to dive into its mixture of yearning, fear, and loneliness."

== Adaptations ==
In early 2025, a theatre in Biarritz, in southern France, staged a play adaptation of the novel.
