= Willie Evans =

Willie Evans may refer to:

- Willie Evans (footballer, born 1912) (1912–1976), Welsh Internationsl footballer
- Willie Evans (running back) (1937–2017), University of Buffalo
- Willie Evans (footballer, born 1939) (1939–c. 2014), Ghanaian footballer
- Willie Evans (defensive end) (born 1984), National Football League

== See also ==
- William Evans (disambiguation)
