= Jamerson =

Jamerson is an American/English surname, and a Brazilian name.

== Name ==
- Jamerson Bahia (born 1998), Brazilian footballer

== Surname ==
Notable people with the surname include:

- Dave Jamerson, American former professional basketball player
- Doug Jamerson (1947–2001), former Education Commissioner of Florida
- James Jamerson (1936–1983), American musician
- James L. Jamerson, American general
- Lefty Jamerson (1900–1980), relief pitcher in Major League Baseball
- Natrell Jamerson, American football defensive back

== See also ==
- Jemerson
