= Will Evans (publisher) =

American publisher

- Born: 1983–1984
- Education: Emory University; Duke University

Will Evans (born 1983–1984) is an American publisher and translator. He is the founder of Deep Vellum Publishing, one of the largest publishing houses for translated fiction in the United States. Evans was also instrumental in Dallas' creation of a poet laureate position.

In 2022, he was inducted into the Texas Institute of Letters. In 2023, he was made a Fellow of the Dallas Institute of Humanities & Culture. In 2024, in acknowledgment of his work in bringing French literature to English-reading audiences, he was made a Chevalier de l'Ordre des Arts et des Lettres by the French Ministry of Culture.

== Early life and education ==
Evans grew up in Wilmington, North Carolina. He attended Emory University, where he received a Bachelor of Arts in History and Russian Language and Culture in 2005. He received a Master of Arts in Russian Culture from Duke University in 2012.

== Deep Vellum ==
Evans moved to Dallas, Texas and founded Deep Vellum Publishing in 2013. In 2015, he opened Deep Vellum Books, a bookstore on Commerce Street in the city's Deep Ellum neighborhood.

In 2019, Deep Vellum Publishing bought two small publishing houses, Los Angeles' Phoneme Media and Austin's A Strange Object. In 2020, Dalkey Archive Press joined the team. Under the leadership of John O’Brien, Dalkey Archive published, among other authors, Jon Fosse.
