= Bill Evans (disambiguation) =

Bill Evans (1929–1980) was a jazz pianist.

Bill Evans may also refer to:

== Other musicians ==
- Bill Evans (saxophonist) (born 1958), jazz saxophonist
- Bill Evans (bluegrass) (born 1956), banjo player, author, and teacher

== Sports ==
- Bill Evans (1910s pitcher) (1893–1946), played for the Pirates
- Bill Evans (1940s pitcher) (1919–1983), played for the Red Sox and White Sox
- Bill Evans (outfielder) (1899–1986)
- Bill Evans (rugby union) (1857–1935), Welsh rugby union international
- Billy Evans (basketball, born 1932) (1932–2020), American member of the 1956 gold medal-winning Olympic team
- Bill Evans (basketball coach) (born 1948), college men's basketball coach
- Bill Evans (dancer), American dancer and choreographer
- Bill Evans (Canadian football) in 1975 CFL draft
- Bill Evans (jockey) on List of Melbourne Cup winners
- Bill Evans (racing driver) in 1979 Australian Touring Car Championship

== Others ==
- Bill Evans (meteorologist) (born 1960), American meteorologist
- Morgan "Bill" Evans (1910–2002), Disney horticulturist
- William B. Evans (born 1958), commissioner of Boston Police Department
- Bill Evans, a police officer killed in the 2010 West Memphis police shootings
- Bill Evans (album), a 1990 album by Paul Motian

== See also ==
- Billy Evans (disambiguation)
- William Evans (disambiguation)
- List of people with surname Evans
