= William L. Kirk =

United States Air Force general

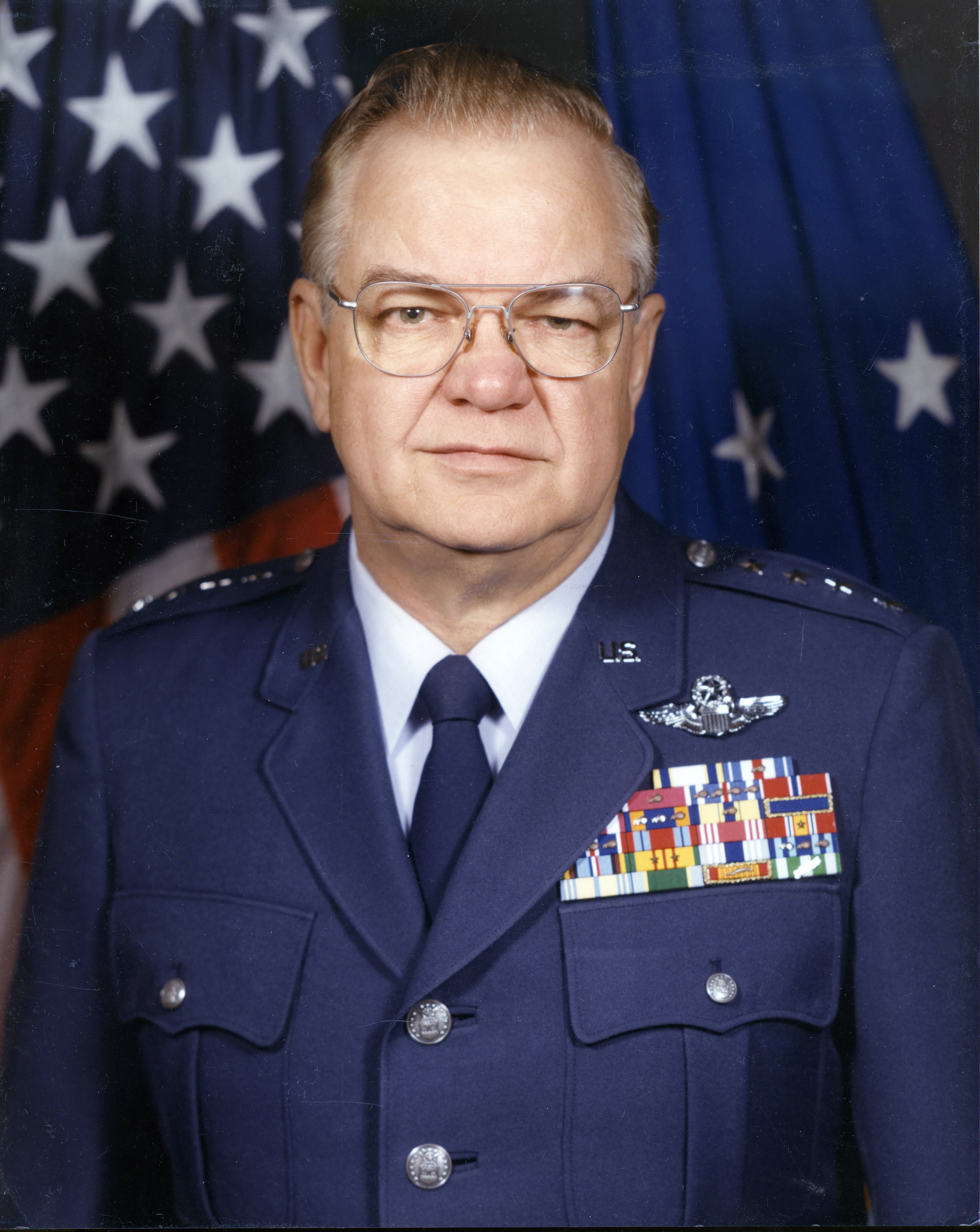
- Born: July 11, 1932; Rayville, Louisiana, U.S.
- Died: April 26, 2017 (aged 84); Niceville, Florida, U.S.
- Burial place: Barrancas National Cemetery; Pensacola, Florida
- Military career
- Allegiance: United States of America
- Branch: United States Air Force
- Service years: 1951–1989
- Rank: General
- Commands: United States Air Forces in Europe; 9th Air Force; 49th Tactical Fighter Wing; 4538th Fighter Weapons Squadron
- Conflicts: Vietnam War
- Awards: Distinguished Service Medal; Silver Star (2); Distinguished Flying Cross (5); Bronze Star Medal

William Leslie Kirk (July 11, 1932 – April 26, 2017) was a four-star general in the United States Air Force (USAF). He served as Commander in Chief, United States Air Forces in Europe/Commander, Allied Air Forces Central Europe (CINCUSAFE/COMAAFCE) from 1987 to 1989.

Kirk was born in 1932, in Rayville, Louisiana. He graduated from Rayville High School in 1950 and attended Northeast Louisiana State College. He completed Squadron Officer School in 1962 and the Air War College in 1971.

He enlisted in the USAF in 1951 and became an aviation cadet in February 1953. He was commissioned as a Second Lieutenant and awarded his pilot's wings in April 1954.

After completing pilot training at Kinston Air Base, North Carolina, as well as Bryan and Perrin Air Force Bases, both in Texas, Kirk attended tactical reconnaissance phase training at Shaw AFB, South Carolina. In October 1954 he was assigned as a pilot with the 17th Tactical Reconnaissance Squadron at Shaw. From March 1955 to June 1957 he served as a pilot with the 15th Tactical Reconnaissance Squadron at Komaki and Yokota Air Bases in Japan. He became a flight commander with the 6021st Tactical Reconnaissance Squadron, Johnson Air Base, Japan, in June 1957.

Kirk returned to the United States in November 1957 and again was assigned to the 17th Tactical Reconnaissance Squadron. From September 1960 to June 1964 he served, first, as pilot, then as Assistant Flight Commander, and finally as flight commander with the 92nd Tactical Fighter Squadron, RAF Bentwaters, England. He then transferred to the 4453rd Combat Crew Training Wing at Davis-Monthan AFB, Arizona, where he served successively as air operations officer, command post controller, instructor pilot, and chief of standardization and evaluation for Tactical Air Command's first F-4 Phantom II replacement training unit.

In June 1966 he completed the F-4 fighter weapons instructor course at Nellis AFB, Nevada and was assigned to the 8th Tactical Fighter Wing Wolf Pack at Ubon Royal Thai Air Force Base, Thailand, in March 1967 serving under famed commander Colonel Robin Olds and deputy commander Daniel James Jr. He destroyed two North Vietnamese MiG fighter aircraft during his 130 F-4 Phantom II missions with the Wolf Pack. Upon his return to the United States in January 1968, he was assigned as a squadron operations officer at Eglin AFB, Florida. He assumed command of the 4538th Fighter Weapons Squadron at Nellis AFB in January 1969.

After completing the Air War College in June 1971, General Kirk was assigned as chief of the Tactics Branch and, later, as deputy chief of the Tactical Division, Directorate of Operations, Office of the Deputy Chief of Staff, Plans and Operations, Headquarters USAF, Washington, D.C., where he was credited with developing the Red Flag training program. Although assigned at the Pentagon, he spent much of this tour of duty in Thailand. In July 1973 he became deputy commander for operations, 4th Tactical Fighter Wing, Seymour Johnson AFB, North Carolina. From January 1974 to January 1976 Kirk was assigned to Holloman AFB, New Mexico, first as vice commander, and later as commander, of the 49th Tactical Fighter Wing.

He then served as Deputy Chief of Staff for Operations, Headquarters 9th Air Force, at Shaw AFB. From November 1977 to June 1979 he was assigned as assistant deputy chief of staff, operations and readiness, Headquarters Pacific Air Forces, Hickam AFB, Hawaii. He then became the command's inspector general. In July 1980 Kirk returned to USAF headquarters as director of electronic combat, Office of the Deputy Chief of Staff, Plans and Operations. He was assigned as deputy chief of staff for operations at Headquarters United States Air Forces in Europe (USAFE), Ramstein Air Base, West Germany, in July 1982. He became commander of 9th Air Force in July 1985. He assumed his final position as CINCUSAFE/COMAAFCE in April 1987. He retired from the USAF on April 12, 1989 and died on April 26, 2017.

== Flight Information ==
- Rating: Command pilot
- Flight hours: More than 6,000
- Aircraft flown: RF-84 Thunderflash, RF-101, F-101 Voodoo, F-4 Phantom II, F-16 Fighting Falcon

== Major awards and decorations ==
| US Air Force Command Pilot Badge |

| Air Force Distinguished Service Medal |
| Silver Star with bronze oak leaf cluster |
| Legion of Merit with bronze oak leaf cluster |
| Distinguished Flying Cross with four bronze oak leaf clusters |
| Bronze Star Medal |
| Meritorious Service Medal with two bronze oak leaf clusters |
| Air Medal with two silver and one bronze oak leaf cluster |
| Air Force Commendation Medal with bronze oak leaf cluster |
| Air Force Outstanding Unit Award with three bronze oak leaf clusters |
| Air Force Organizational Excellence Award |
| Combat Readiness Medal |
| Army Good Conduct Medal |
| National Defense Service Medal with one bronze service star |
| Armed Forces Expeditionary Medal |
| Vietnam Service Medal with two bronze service stars |
| Air Force Overseas Short Tour Service Ribbon |
| Air Force Overseas Long Tour Service Ribbon with three bronze oak leaf clusters |
| Air Force Longevity Service Award with silver and three bronze oak leaf clusters |
| Armed Forces Reserve Medal |
| Small Arms Expert Marksmanship Ribbon |
| Air Force Training Ribbon |
| Vietnam Campaign Medal |

== See also ==
- List of commanders of USAFE
