= Billy Evans (disambiguation) =

Billy Evans (1884–1956) was an American umpire in Major League Baseball.

Billy Evans may also refer to:

- Billy Evans (businessman), entrepreneur, and partner of Elizabeth Holmes
- Billy Lee Evans (born 1941), American politician from Georgia
- Billy Evans (footballer, born 1921) (1921–1960), English football (soccer) player
- Billy Evans (Australian footballer) (born 1996), Australian rules footballer
- Billy Evans (basketball, born 1932) (1932–2020), American basketball player who played at the University of Kentucky
- Billy Evans (basketball, born 1947) (born 1947), American basketball player who played at Boston College and then in the ABA
- Billy Evans (1980–2021), American murder victim

== See also ==
- Billie Evans, married name of British singer and actress Billie Piper when she was married to DJ Chris Evans
- Bill Evans (disambiguation)
- William Evans (disambiguation)
