= List of commanders of USAFE =

Senior United States Air Force appointment

Commander of United States Air Forces in Europe – Air Forces Africa
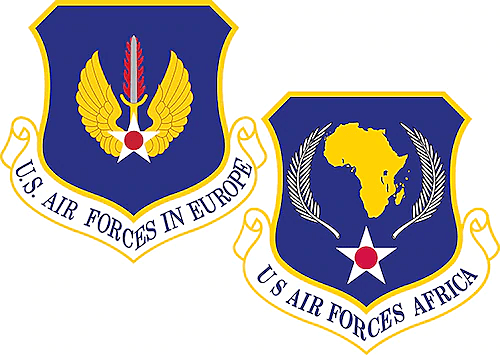
- Insignia of USAFE-AFRICA

- Flag of a U.S. Air Force four-star general

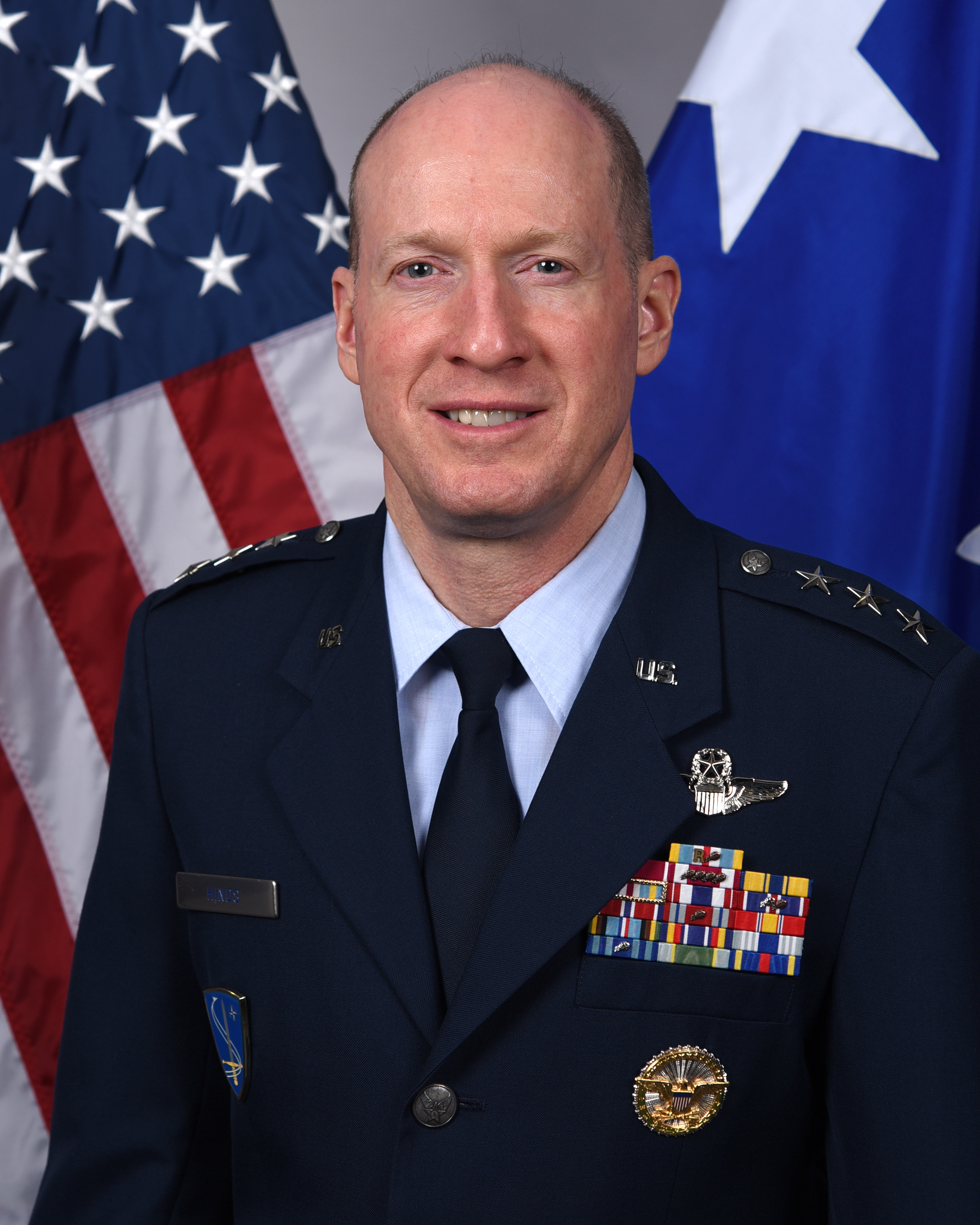
- Incumbent; Lieutenant General Jason T. Hinds; Acting since May 3, 2025
- United States Air Forces in Europe – Air Forces Africa
- Type: Service component commander
- Abbreviation: COMUSAFE/COMAFAFRICA
- Reports to: Secretary of the Air Force (administrative); Chief of Staff of the United States Air Force (administrative); Commander, U.S. European Command (operational); Commander, U.S. Africa Command (operational)
- Seat: Ramstein Air Base, Rhineland-Palatinate, Germany
- Appointer: The president; with Senate advice and consent
- Term length: 2–3 years; (approx.)
- Precursor: Commanding General, U.S. Strategic Air Forces in Europe
- Inaugural holder: Lt Gen John K. Cannon
- Formation: July 4, 1945
- Deputy: Deputy Commander, United States Air Forces in Europe – Air Forces Africa

The commander, United States Air Forces Europe (COMUSAFE) is the most senior officer and head of the United States air forces in Europe. In October 2025, it was reported that the post will be downgraded from a four-star rank to three-star. This is in line with the Department of War directive to reduce general and flag officer positions.

== List of USAFE commanders ==
#	Photo	Name	Dates	Notes
–		Jason T. Hinds	2025–present	
39		James B. Hecker	2022–2025	
38		Jeffrey L. Harrigian	2019-2022	
37		Tod D. Wolters	2016-2019	Commander, U.S. European Command/Supreme Allied Commander Europe (CDRUSEUCOM/SACEUR), 2019–2022.
36		Frank Gorenc	2013-2016	
35		Philip M. Breedlove	2012-2013	Vice Chief of Staff, U.S. Air Force (VCSAF), 2011–2012.; Commander, U.S. European Command/Supreme Allied Commander Europe (CDRUSEUCOM/SACEUR), 2013–2016.
34		Mark Welsh	2010-2012	Chief of Staff, U.S. Air Force (CSAF), 2012–2016.
33		Roger A. Brady	2008-2010	
32		William T. Hobbins	2005-2007	
31		Robert H. Foglesong	2003-2005	Vice Chief of Staff, U.S. Air Force (VCSAF), 2001–2003.
30		Gregory S. Martin	2000-2003	Commander, Air Force Materiel Command (COMAFMC), 2003–2005.
29		John P. Jumper	1997-2000	Commander, Air Combat Command (COMACC), 2000–2001.; Chief of Staff, U.S. Air Force (CSAF), 2001–2005.
28		Michael E. Ryan	1996-1997	Chief of Staff, U.S. Air Force (CSAF), 1997–2001.
27		Richard E. Hawley	1995-1996	Commander, Air Combat Command (COMACC), 1996–1999.
26		James L. Jamerson	1994-1995	
25		Robert C. Oaks	1990-1994	
24		Michael J. Dugan	1989-1990	Chief of Staff, U.S. Air Force (CSAF), 1990.; Special Assistant to the Secretary of the Air Force, 1990–1991.
23		William L. Kirk	1987-1989	
22		Charles L. Donnelly, Jr.	1984-1987	
21		Billy M. Minter	1982-1984	
20		Charles A. Gabriel	1980-1982	Chief of Staff, U.S. Air Force (CSAF), 1982–1986.
19		John W. Pauly	1978-1980	
18		William J. Evans	1977-1978	Commander, Air Force Systems Command (COMAFSC), 1975–1977.
17		Richard H. Ellis	1975-1977	Vice Chief of Staff, U.S. Air Force (VCSAF), 1973–1975.; Commander in Chief, Strategic Air Command (CINCSAC), 1977–1981.
16		John W. Vogt, Jr.	1974-1975	Commander, Seventh Air Force, 1972–1973.; Commander in Chief, Pacific Air Forces (CINCPACAF), 1973–1974.
15		David C. Jones	1971-1974	Chief of Staff, U.S. Air Force (CSAF), 1974–1978.; Chairman of The Joint Chiefs of Staff (CJCS), 1978–1982.
14		Joseph R. Holzapple	1969-1971	
13		Horace M. Wade	1968-1969	Vice Chief of Staff, U.S. Air Force (VCSAF), 1972–1973.
12		Maurice A. Preston	1966-1968	
11		Bruce K. Holloway	1965–1966	Vice Chief of Staff, U.S. Air Force (VCSAF), 1966–1968.; Commander-in-Chief, Strategic Air Command (CINCSAC), 1968–1972.
10		Gabriel P. Disosway	1963-1965	Commander, Tactical Air Command (COMTAC), 1965–1968.
9		Truman H. Landon	1961-1963	
8		Frederic H. Smith, Jr.	1959-1961	Vice Chief of Staff, U.S. Air Force (VCSAF), 1961–1962.
7		Frank F. Everest	1957-1959	Commander, Tactical Air Command (COMTAC), 1959–1961.
6		William H. Tunner	1953-1957	
5		Lauris Norstad	1951-1953	Supreme Allied Commander, Europe (SACEUR), 1952–1962.
4		John K. Cannon	1948-1951	Commanding General, Tactical Air Command (CG TAC), 1951–1954.
3		Curtis LeMay	1947-1948	Commander-in-Chief, Strategic Air Command (CINCSAC), 1955–1957.; Vice Chief of Staff, U.S. Air Force (VCSAF), 1957–1961.; Chief of Staff, U.S. Air Force (CSAF), 1961–1965.
2		Idwal H. Edwards	1946-1947	
1		John K. Cannon	1945-1946	

== See also ==
- List of United States Air Force four-star generals
- List of commanders-in-chief of the Strategic Air Command
- List of commanders of Tactical Air Command
