= Maurice A. Preston =

United States Air Force general (1912–1983)

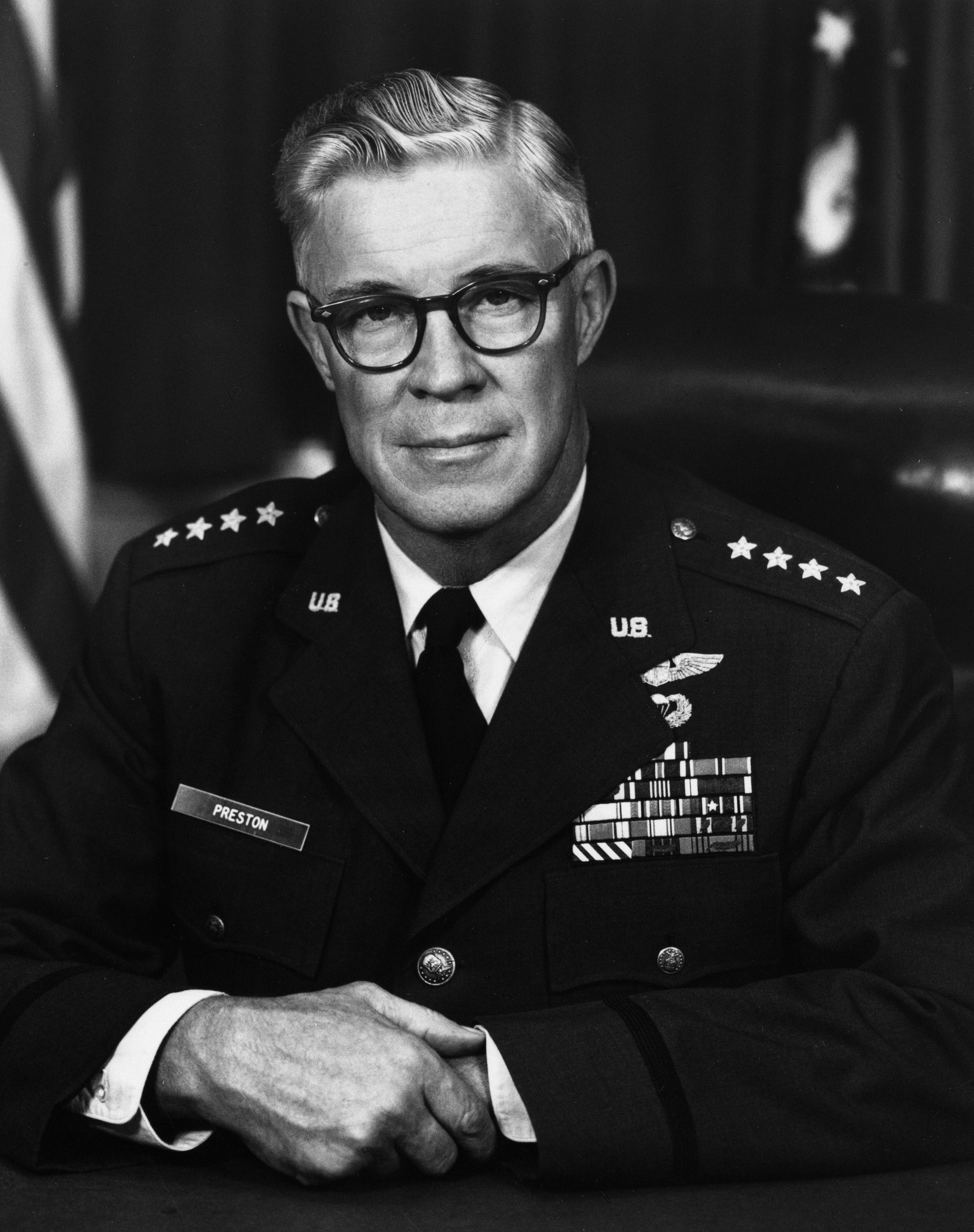
- Preston in 1966
- Born: November 25, 1912; Weed, California
- Died: January 25, 1983 (aged 70); Bethesda, Maryland
- Military career
- Allegiance: United States of America
- Branch: United States Air Force
- Service years: 1937–1968
- Rank: General
- Nickname: Mo/Moe
- Commands: United States Air Forces in Europe; Fifth Air Force; U.S. Forces Japan; Nineteenth Air Force
- Conflicts: World War II
- Awards: Silver Star (2); Legion of Merit (2); Distinguished Flying Cross (3); Bronze Star; Air Medal (8)

Maurice Arthur Preston (November 25, 1912 – January 25, 1983) was a United States Air Force four-star general who served as Commander in Chief, United States Air Forces in Europe (CINCUSAFE) from 1966 to 1968.

== Early life ==
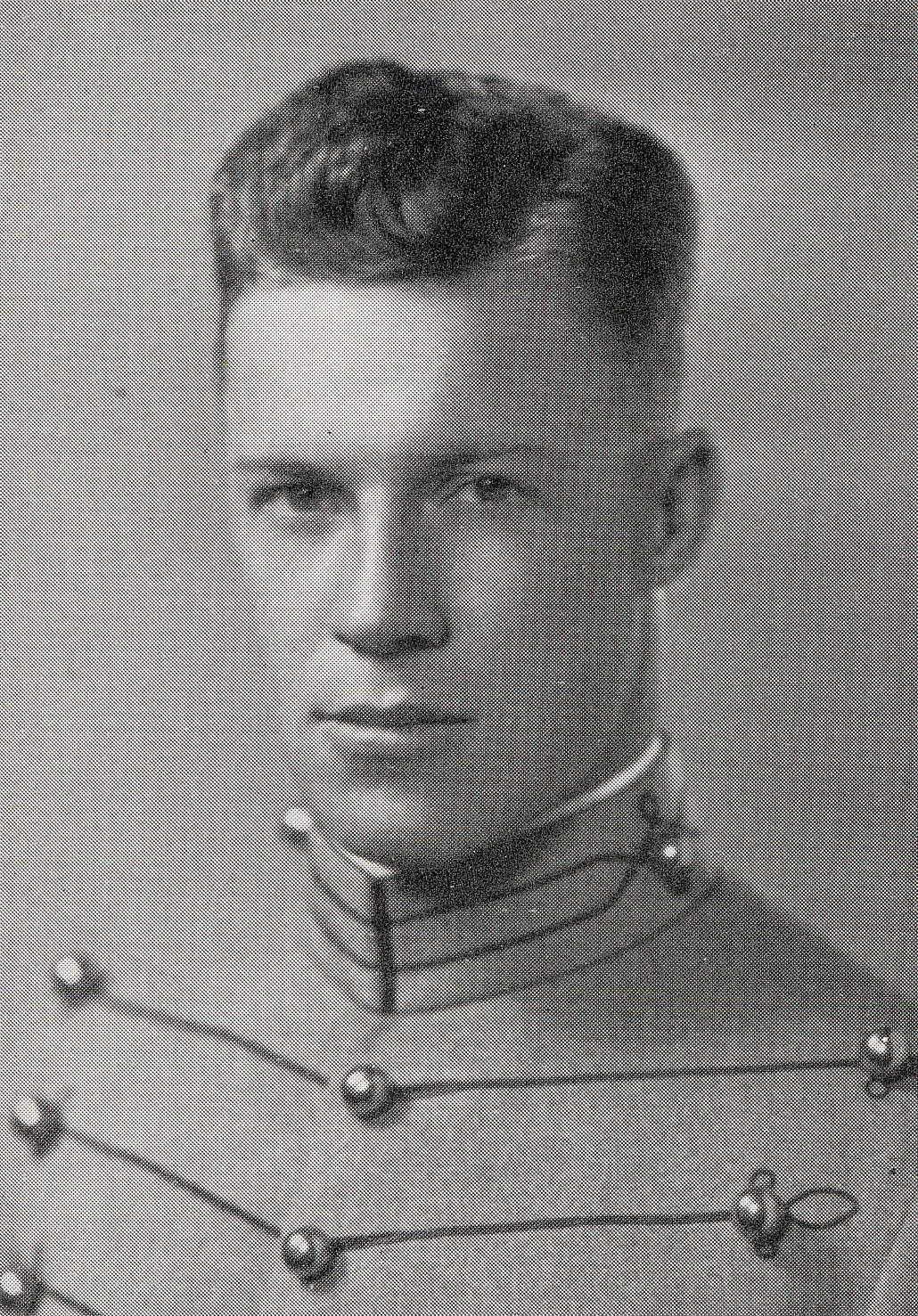
Preston as a United States Military Academy cadet c. 1937

Preston was born in Weed, California, in 1912, and graduated from high school in Tulare, California, in 1931. After attending Saint Mary's College of California, he entered the United States Military Academy, graduating June 12, 1937.

== Military career ==
Preston completed flying school at Kelly Field, Texas, in October 1938, and then served in various squadron positions before he was assigned as commander of the 62nd Bombardment Squadron at Davis-Monthan Field, Arizona, in 1941. He later became deputy group commander of the 34th Bombardment Group there.

In June 1942, Preston was transferred to Gowen Field, Idaho, and served as deputy group commander of the 34th Bombardment Group and then as deputy commander of the 29th Bombardment Group. In January 1943, he became commander of the 379th Bombardment Group at Wendover Field, Utah. He took the 379th to Europe in early 1943 and flew 45 combat missions in the B-17 Flying Fortress. He participated in the now-historic Schweinfurt raids, leading the second one on April 13, 1944. He commanded the 41st Bombardment Wing from October 1944 until May 1945, when he returned to the United States. Preston was then assigned as base commander of the 231st Army Air Force Base Unit at Alamogordo, New Mexico.

Preston enrolled as a student at the Air Command and Staff School, Maxwell Field, Alabama, in August 1946, and upon graduating in June 1947, became the chief, Inter-American Security Branch and Military Coordinating Committee, of the Permanent Joint Board of Defense Canada and United States, Washington, D.C. He later joined the Plans Division of Air Force Headquarters in Washington, D.C.

Going overseas in 1949, Preston was appointed deputy commander for Plans and Operations of the U.S. Northeastern Command, with duty station at St. John's, Newfoundland. Assigned to the Strategic Air Command in March 1952, he became commander of the 308th Bombardment Wing (Medium) at Hunter Air Force Base, Georgia. In January 1954 he assumed command of the Strategic Air Command's 4th Air Division at Barksdale Air Force Base, Louisiana.

Reassigned to Air Force Headquarters, Washington, D.C., in May 1956, Preston was named deputy director of operations in the Office of the Deputy Chief of Staff/Operations. He assumed the position of director of operations in August 1957. In 1958, [2] Preston assisted his former hometown in obtaining on loan a B-17G then stationed at Eglin AFB for permanent display as a tribute to its past. Preston flew the aircraft from Davis Monthan AFB in Tucson, Az, to Castle AFB in Atwater, CA. He then flew reporters on an aerial tour of his former hometown then landed in nearby Visalia. Because was still in the USAF he was not allowed to land on the short Tulare runway, and had to turn the controls over to another pilot for the August 4, 1958 landing. On July 25, 1960, he became commander of the Tactical Air Command's Nineteenth Air Force, often termed "the suitcase Air Force" because of its ability to move instantly anywhere in the world as the command nucleus and planning elements of the Tactical Air Command's Composite Air Strike Force. He became commander, U.S. Forces Japan and commander, Fifth Air Force, in August 1963, and in August 1966 he assumed command of United States Air Forces in Europe.

Preston logged some 7,000 flying hours in most types of aircraft within the U.S. Air Force. He was rated as a navigator and bombardier, and in addition to being a command pilot, he became the first Air Force officer of his rank to go through the Army's airborne school, earning his paratrooper's wings in October 1960.

In July 1966 Emperor Hirohito of Japan conferred Japan's First Order of the Sacred Treasure on Preston, then commander of the U.S. Forces Japan and Fifth Air Force. The decoration, one of the highest awards the Government of Japan bestows upon a foreign military officer, was presented to Preston by Defense Minister Raizo Matsuno and General Yoshifusa Amano, chairman of the Joint Staff Council, Defense Agency.

His other decorations include the Silver Star with oak leaf cluster, Legion of Merit with oak leaf cluster, Distinguished Flying Cross with two oak leaf clusters, Bronze Star Medal, Air Medal with seven oak loaf clusters, Army Commendation Medal and the Purple Heart.

== Later life ==
Preston retired from the Air Force on August 1, 1968. He died of cancer January 25, 1983.

== Notes ==
- Thompson, Scott. Final Cut: The Post War B-17 Flying Fortress, The Survivors. pp. 188–189. ISBN 978-1-57510-143-9.
- This article incorporates public domain material from the United States Air Force

== See also ==
- List of commanders of USAFE
