= William Evans (cricketer, born 1897) =

English cricketer and civil servant

Personal information
- Full name: William Lewis Evans
- Born: 29 November 1897; Streatham, Surrey, England
- Died: 25 April 1966 (aged 68); Epsom, Surrey, England
- Batting: Unknown
- Bowling: Unknown

Career statistics
Competition	First-class
Matches	1
Runs scored	23
Batting average	23.00
100s/50s	0/0
Top score	15*
Balls bowled	102
Wickets	0
Bowling average	–
5 wickets in innings	0
10 wickets in match	0
Best bowling	–
Catches/stumpings	1/–
- Source: Cricinfo, 17 February 2019

William Lewis Evans (29 November 1897 – 25 April 1966) was an English first-class cricketer and civil servant.

Evans was born at Streatham. He first joined the Civil Service in January 1913 as a clerk, later transferring to the Office of Works in May 1920. Evans represented the Civil Service cricket team in its only appearance in first-class cricket against the touring New Zealanders at Chiswick in 1927. Batting twice during the match, he scored 8 runs in the Civil Service first-innings before being dismissed by Curly Page, while in their second-innings he ended not out on 15. He bowled seventeen wicketless overs in the New Zealanders only innings, conceding 52 runs.

By 1937, he was employed as a clerk in the Inland Revenue. He died at Epsom in April 1966.
