= Joseph R. Holzapple =

United States Air Force general

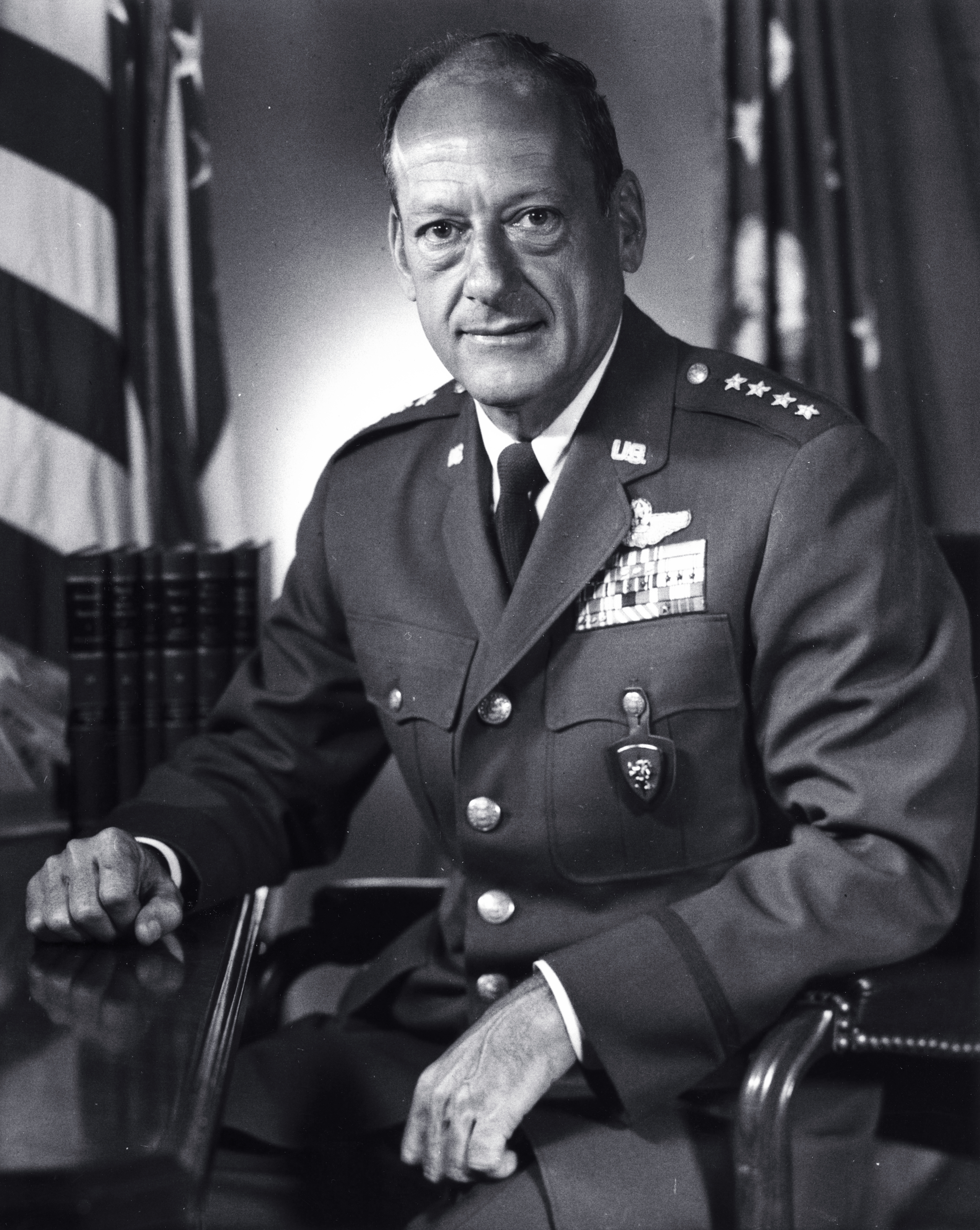
- General Joseph R. Holzapple
- Born: September 7, 1914; Peoria, Illinois, U.S.
- Died: November 14, 1973 (aged 59); Arlington, Virginia, U.S.
- Military career
- Allegiance: United States of America
- Branch: United States Air Force
- Service years: 1941–1971
- Rank: General
- Commands: U.S. Air Forces in Europe; 47th Bombardment Wing
- Conflicts: World War II
- Awards: Silver Star; Legion of Merit; United States Distinguished Flying Cross (2); United Kingdom Distinguished Flying Cross; Air Medal (19)

Joseph Randall Holzapple (September 7, 1914 – November 14, 1973) was a United States Air Force four-star general who served as Commander in Chief, U.S. Air Forces in Europe (CINCUSAFE) from 1969 to 1971.

== Military career ==
Holzapple was born in 1914 in Peoria, Illinois, where he graduated from Bradley University in 1938 with a Bachelor of Science degree in business administration. He received an honorary doctor of laws degree from the same university in 1958. He entered aviation cadet training in December 1940 and graduated in August 1941 with a commission as second lieutenant and his pilot wings. Subsequently, he performed various flying duties at Jackson, Mississippi; Patterson Field, Ohio; and Barksdale Field, Louisiana.

He was ordered to the European Theater of Operations in September 1942, where he served as operations officer and then commander of the 319th Bombardment Group, Twelfth Air Force. He flew 91 combat missions in North Africa and Europe with a total of 390 combat hours primarily in Martin B-26 Marauder aircraft. In November 1944 the 319th Group converted to North American B-25 Mitchell aircraft and used them for approximately two months before the group returned to the United States where it was reequipped with Douglas A-26 Invader aircraft. In May 1945 the group moved to Okinawa where it operated until August 1945. During this period, Holzapple flew eight combat missions over Japan and mainland China, totaling 33 combat hours.

Holzapple returned to the United States in February 1946 and was assigned to Headquarters Army Air Forces, Washington, D.C., with duties in the Requirements Division of the Office of the Assistant Chief of Staff for Training and Requirements. He entered the Armed Forces Staff College in Norfolk, Virginia, in August 1949 and completed the Joint Operations Course there in January 1950. He returned to Washington, D.C., and was assigned to Headquarters U.S. Air Force for duties with the Air Force Special Weapons Project.

In September 1951 he was assigned to the Air Research and Development Command at Baltimore, Maryland, where he served first as the deputy for strategic air and later as assistant for operational readiness. From August 1954 to August 1955, he attended the National War College at Washington, D.C.

After graduation, Holzapple went overseas to RAF Sculthorpe to become commander of the 47th Bombardment Wing. In October 1956 he was assigned to U.S. Air Forces in Europe with headquarters at Wiesbaden, Germany, as deputy chief of staff for operations, and later became chief of staff.

In July 1958 Holzapple again was assigned to Headquarters U.S. Air Force, this time as deputy director for operational forces with Office of the Deputy Chief of Staff for Operations. In August 1959 he was assigned to the Air Research and Development Command at Wright-Patterson Air Force Base, Ohio, as assistant deputy commander for weapons systems management, and in July 1960 he became commander of Wright Air Development Division.

He was reassigned in July 1961 to Headquarters U.S. Air Force as assistant deputy chief of staff for systems and logistics. In May 1964 he became director of the Weapon Systems Evaluation Group, Office of the Director of Defense Research and Engineering, Department of Defense. In September 1966 he returned to Headquarters U.S. Air Force as deputy chief of staff for research and development.

Holzapple became commander in chief, U.S. Air Forces in Europe, with headquarters at Lindsey Air Station, Wiesbaden, Germany, and commander of the Fourth Allied Tactical Air Force with headquarters at Ramstein Air Base, Germany, in January 1969. He received an honorary doctor of laws degree from the University of Utah, Salt Lake City, Utah, in 1970. He retired from the Air Force on September 1, 1971, and died on November 14, 1973.

== Awards and decorations ==
His military decorations included the Air Force Distinguished Service Medal with oak leaf cluster, Silver Star, Legion of Merit, Distinguished Flying Cross with oak leaf cluster, Air Medal with 18 oak leaf clusters, and Distinguished Unit Citation Emblem with oak leaf cluster. His foreign awards included the Croix de Guerre with etoile d'argent (France), the Croix de Guerre with palm (France), and the Distinguished Flying Cross (Great Britain). He was a command pilot.

== See also ==
- List of commanders of USAFE
