= Deep Vellum =

American publisher of translated literature

- Founded: 2013
- Founder: Will Evans
- Country of origin: United States
- Headquarters location: Deep Ellum, Dallas, Texas, U.S.
- Imprints: A Strange Object, La Reunion, Phoneme Media
- Official website: deepvellum.org

Deep Vellum is a non-profit publishing house that specializes in translated literature based in Dallas, Texas, United States. Deep Vellum is the country's largest publisher of literature in translation.

Its authors include Jon Fosse who received the 2023 Nobel Prize in Literature.

The publisher has helped grow the literary community in Dallas.

In 2024, Deep Vellum's founder, Will Evans, was bestowed the title of Chevalier de l'Ordre des Arts et des Lettres by the French Ministry of Culture for his work in bringing French literature to English-reading audiences through the publishing house.

== History ==
In 2019 the company acquired two independent publishing houses, Phoneme Media of Los Angeles and A Strange Object of Austin.

In 2020, the company acquired the Dalkey Archive Press based in McLean, Illinois. The press was relaunched in April 2022.
