= William J. Evans (general) =

United States Air Force general

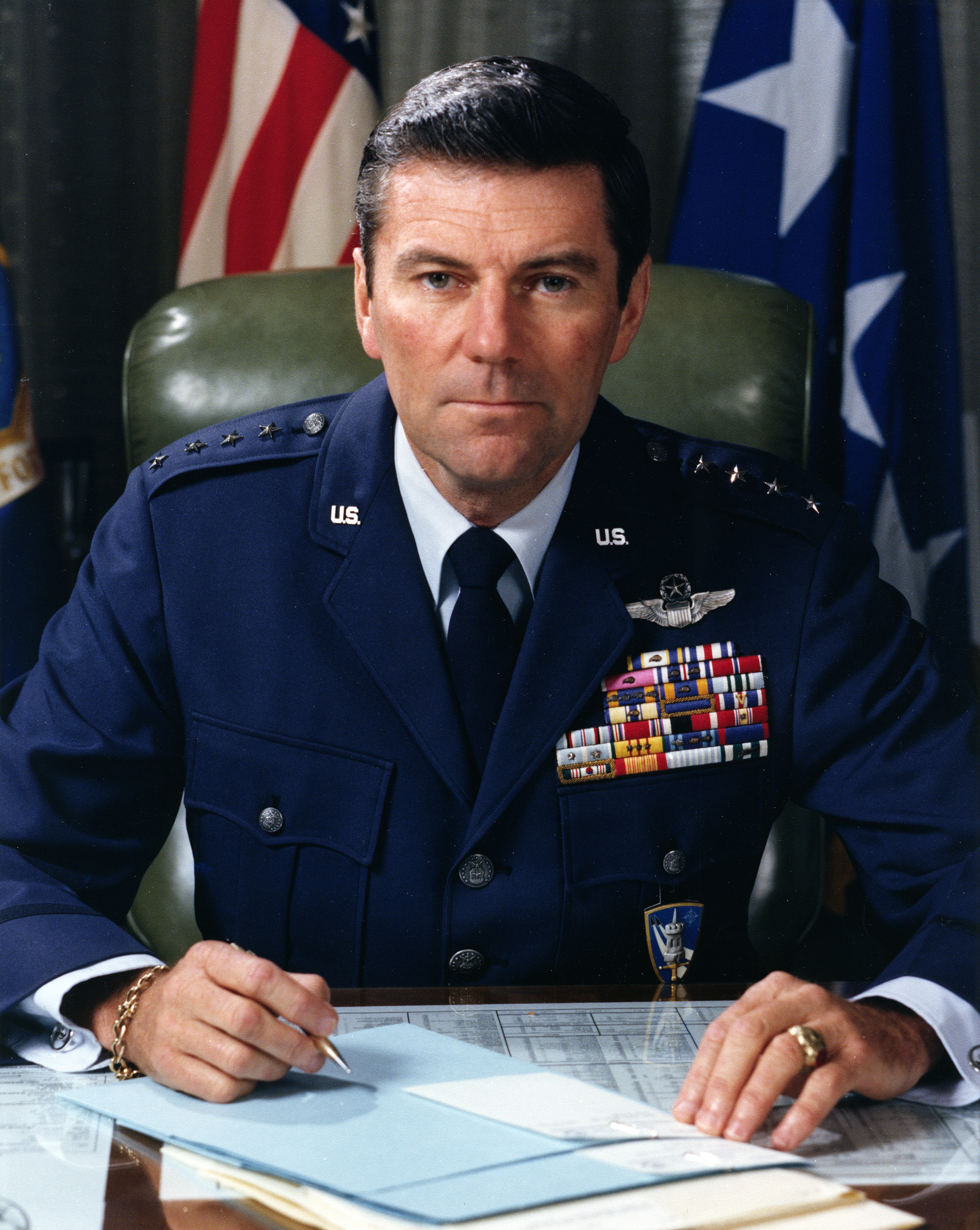
- Born: March 4, 1924; Norwich, Connecticut, U.S.
- Died: December 12, 2000 (aged 76); Scottsdale, Arizona, U.S.
- Military career
- Allegiance: United States
- Branch: United States Air Force
- Service years: 1943–1978
- Rank: General
- Commands: 434th Fighter-Bomber Squadron; Vice Commander, 7272d Flying Training Wing; 31st Tactical Fighter Wing; Air Force Systems Command; Allied Air Forces Central Europe; United States Air Forces in Europe
- Conflicts: World War II; Cold War; Korean War; Vietnam War

William John Evans (March 4, 1924 – December 12, 2000) was a general in the United States Air Force and commander of Allied Air Forces Central Europe.

== Early life ==
Evans was born in Norwich, Connecticut, in 1924. He graduated from St. Mary Parochial School and in 1942 from Norwich Free Academy. He was offered a scholarship to Yale University and entered that summer.

== Military career ==
Later that year he received an appointment to the United States Military Academy at West Point, New York, which he entered in July 1943 and was commissioned as a second lieutenant in the Army Air Corps and received a Bachelor of Science degree in military engineering in June 1946.

He next entered fighter transition training at Williams Field and gunnery school at Ajo, Arizona. His first tactical assignment was with the 20th Fighter Group at Shaw Field, South Carolina, in November 1946. In June 1948, he was transferred to the 475th Tactical Fighter Group at Itazuke Air Base, Japan.

At the start of the Korean War in June 1950, he flew P-51 Mustang aircraft with the 35th Fighter-Interceptor Group from Tsuiki Air Field, and Taegu Air Base. Later that year, he was transferred to Headquarters Fifth Air Force at Taegu, where he continued to fly intelligence missions for the headquarters. Before returning to the United States in 1951, he completed approximately 130 combat missions in the P-51, P-80 Shooting Star, T-6 Texan and L-5 Sentinel aircraft.

From September 1951 to March 1952, he was assigned to the Air Research and Development Command, Baltimore, Maryland. In April 1952, he was transferred to the 479th Tactical Fighter Wing at George Air Force Base, California, where he commanded the 434th Fighter-Bomber Squadron, equipped with F-51 Mustang and later F-86 Sabre aircraft.

In April 1954, he returned to the Far East as executive officer to the commander, Far East Air Forces. In July 1955, he was assigned to Headquarters Air Defense Command, and in July 1956 he returned to George Air Force Base to command the 436th Fighter-Day Squadron, equipped with F-100 Super Sabre aircraft. In 1958, he became director of operations for the 479th Tactical Fighter Wing and was responsible for the conversion of the wing to F-104 Starfighter aircraft.

In August 1959, he entered the Army War College in Carlisle Barracks, Pennsylvania, and after graduation in June 1960 was assigned to the Armed Forces Staff College in Norfolk, Virginia, where he served on the faculty until June 1964.

Evans next was transferred to Wheelus Air Base, Libya, and served as deputy for operations and later as vice commander of the 7272d Flying Training Wing, the weapons training center for the United States Air Forces in Europe.

He volunteered for Southeast Asia duty in 1966 and was transferred to the Republic of Vietnam in May 1967 as vice commander, and later was commander of the 31st Tactical Fighter Wing at Tuy Hoa Air Base. Before returning to the United States in May 1968, he completed 278 combat missions in the F-100 Super Sabre aircraft.

In June 1968, Evans was assigned as assistant deputy director for concepts and operational readiness, Defense Communications Planning Group, Washington, D.C., and in June 1969 he assumed duties as the deputy director.

In February 1970, Evans was assigned to Headquarters United States Air Force, Washington D.C., as special assistant for sensor exploitation, a newly created office. He was transferred in April 1971 to the Office of the Deputy Chief of Staff, Research and Development, as director of operational requirements and development plans, and in September 1971 he became director of development and acquisitions. In April 1972, Evans became assistant deputy chief of staff, research and development, and in August 1973 he was appointed deputy chief of staff, research and development.

He was promoted to the grade of general September 1, 1975, with date of rank August 30, 1975.

General Evans became commander of the Air Force Systems Command, Andrews Air Force Base, Maryland, in August 1975. He was appointed commander, Allied Air Forces Central Europe and commander in chief, United States Air Forces in Europe on July 29, 1977.

He was a command pilot with more than 6,200 flying hours to his credit, the majority of which were in fighter aircraft, including the P-51 Mustang, P-82 Twin Mustang, P-80 Shooting Star, F-84 Thunderjet, F-86 Sabre, F-100 Super Sabre, F-102 Delta Dagger, F-104 Starfighter, F-4 Phantom, F-5 Freedom Fighter, F-111 Aardvark, A-7 Corsair II, F-14 Tomcat, and F-15 Eagle, CF-100 Canuck, Harrier jump jet, de Havilland Vampire, Gloster Meteor, Dassault Mirage F1, Saab 37 Viggen. He has also flown the B-1 Lancer, the McDonnell Douglas DC-10, the T-43 Bobcat, the YC-14 and the YC-15.

== Awards ==
Awards earned during his career:

- Air Force Distinguished Service Medal with an oak leaf cluster
- Silver Star
- Legion of Merit with oak leaf cluster
- Distinguished Flying Cross with two oak leaf clusters
- Bronze Star Medal
- Air Medal with 24 oak leaf clusters
- Joint Service Commendation Medal
- Air Force Commendation Medal with oak leaf cluster
- Republic of Vietnam Air Force Distinguished Service Order, 2nd Class
- Republic of Vietnam Gallantry Cross (device unknown)
- Republic of Korea Presidential Unit Citation
- Republic of Vietnam Campaign Medal with 1960- device
- Norwich Native Son Award

== Effective dates of promotion ==
Insignia	Rank	Date
	General	September 1, 1975
	Lieutenant general	August 1, 1973
	Major general	November 1, 1971
	Brigadier general	August 1, 1969
	Colonel	March 15, 1962
	Lieutenant colonel	April 13, 1956
	Major	April 28, 1951
	Captain	July 22, 1950
	First lieutenant	March 26, 1948
	Second lieutenant	June 4, 1946

== See also ==
- List of commanders of USAFE
