= William Evans (ornithologist) =

Scottish naturalist, ornithologist, and actuary

William Evans FRSE FFA FSA MBOU (1851–1922) was a Scottish naturalist, ornithologist and actuary. He was described as one of the most competent field naturalists of his day. He served as President of the Royal Physical Society of Edinburgh.

== Life ==
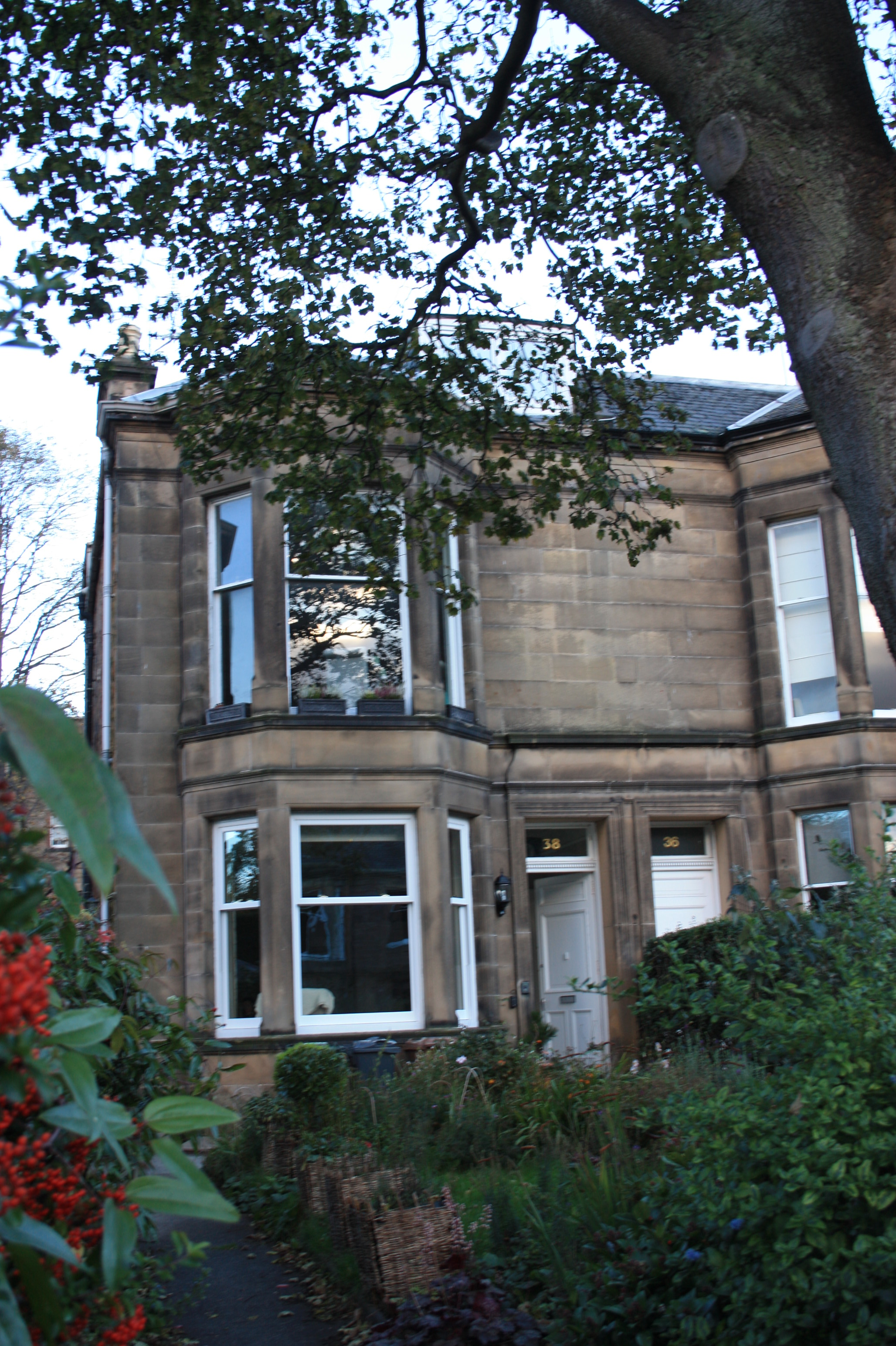
38 Morningside Park, Edinburgh

He was born at the Royal Botanic Garden Edinburgh (presumably in the East Lodge), where his father, William Wilson Evans, was Curator, on 9 May 1851.

After a wonderful early exposure to botany, his family moved in 1857 to Tynefield Farm near East Linton (east of Edinburgh) where his interests continued with a more practical vein. Here though, he came under the influence of Charles Nelson of Pitcox, who extended his interests from plant life to birds, William also taking a keen interest in sculpting birds from wood from this time. During this time he was educated at the Free Kirk School in East Linton.

William also spent some later years with his uncle at Buckstone Farm near Mortonhall, Edinburgh (the farm now giving rise to the name of one of Edinburgh's suburbs). Around 1865 his father received an appointment as Agent and Factor on the estate of Sir George Clerk of Penicuik and the family therefore moved to Penicuik (south of Edinburgh). William was then sent to the Edinburgh Institution (now Stewart's Melville College) for further schooling. At age 17 (in 1868) he was apprenticed as an actuary in the Scottish Widows Fund. By 1892 he had reached the level of Assistant Actuary to the Fund, but had to retire due to ill-health. Curiously, his election as a Fellow of the Royal Society of Edinburgh in 1884 is minuted as being due to his actuarial skills rather than naturalist skills. His proposers were Robert Gray, Thomas Bond Sprague, John MacGregor McCandlish, and Sir Peter Redford Scott.

In later life he lived at 38 Morningside Park in south-west Edinburgh. In the later 19th century he conducted a correspondence with the German ornithologist Ernst Hartert, these documents are now held in the Natural History Museum, London.

He died on 23 October 1922.

== Family ==
In 1879 he married Patricia Jane Deuchar (1849–1921). They had one son, William Edgar Evans (1882-1963), and one daughter, Charlotte E. Evans. William Edgar Evans followed in his father's footsteps becoming a botanist and Assistant in Charge of the Herbarium at the Royal Botanic Garden Edinburgh from 1919 to 1944. He was also a Fellow of the Royal Society of Edinburgh.

== Publications ==
- The Mammalian Fauna of the Edinburgh District (1906)
