= John W. Vogt Jr. =

United States Air Force general and World War II flying ace

John W. Vogt
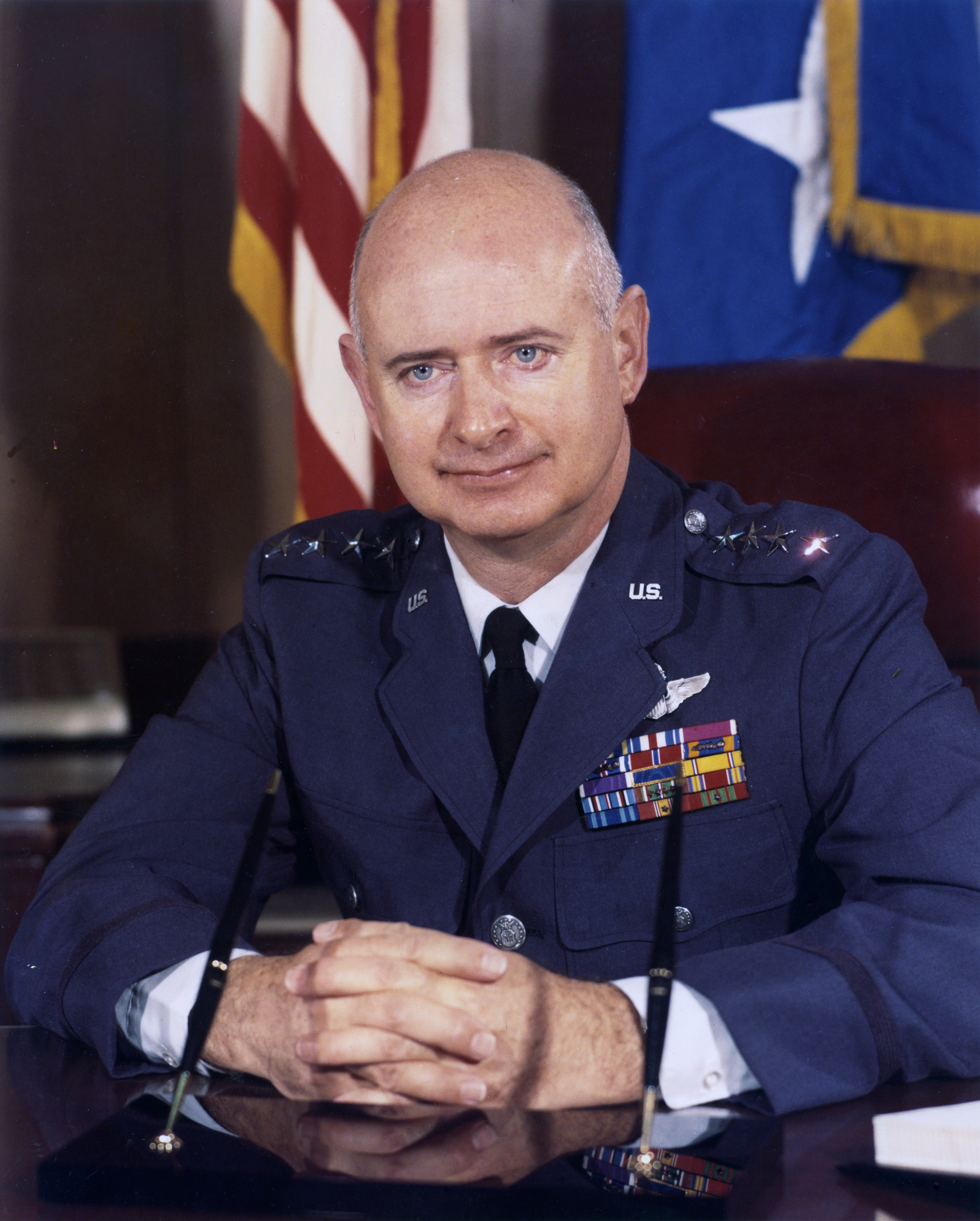
- Born: March 18, 1920; Elizabeth, New Jersey
- Died: April 16, 2010 (aged 90); Melbourne, Florida
- Military career
- Allegiance: United States
- Branch: United States Army Air Forces; United States Air Force
- Service years: 1941–1975
- Rank: General
- Commands: Allied Air Forces Central Europe; United States Air Forces in Europe; Pacific Air Forces; 360th Fighter Squadron
- Conflicts: World War II; Vietnam War
- Awards: Air Force Distinguished Service Medal (4); Army Distinguished Service Medal; Silver Star; Legion of Merit; Distinguished Flying Cross (5); Bronze Star Medal; Air Medal (4); Purple Heart

General John William Vogt Jr. (March 18, 1920 – April 16, 2010) was a flying ace of the United States Army Air Forces in World War II who later achieved the rank of general in the United States Air Force during the Cold War period. He was commander Allied Air Forces Central Europe and commander in chief United States Air Forces in Europe at Ramstein Air Base, Germany in the 1970s.

== Biography ==
Vogt was born on March 18, 1920, in Elizabeth, New Jersey, where he graduated from Thomas Jefferson High School in 1938. He received his Bachelor of Arts degree from Yale University and his Master of Arts from Columbia University. He was also a fellow of the Harvard School for International Affairs. In 1941 he entered the Army Air Corps as an aviation cadet and attended flying schools at Randolph Field and Ellington Field, Texas. He received his pilot wings and commission as second lieutenant in April 1942.

From April to December 1942, he served as a fighter pilot with the 63d Fighter Squadron, 56th Fighter Group. In January 1943 he accompanied his squadron to England and completed a combat tour of duty as a flight commander. In May 1944 he became commander of the 360th Fighter Squadron, 356th Fighter Group, and completed a second combat tour. He participated in the Air Offensive, Europe, and Rhineland campaigns and the Normandy Invasion.

He destroyed eight enemy aircraft in aerial combat and in so doing became an ace.

From November 1945 to July 1946, he served as commander of the First Air Base Squadron and Ibura Army Base at Recife, Brazil, where he remained until he returned to the United States.

After various staff assignments, he was assigned, in 1951, to the Office of the Special Assistant to the Joint Chiefs of Staff for National Security Council Affairs, where he worked with the senior staff, and later, the planning board of the National Security Council.

In August 1955 he became assistant deputy for plans and operations, Headquarters Far East Air Forces, Japan. The following year, he was transferred to Hickam Air Force Base, Hawaii, as the special assistant to the chief of staff, commander in chief, Pacific.

In 1960 Vogt was assigned to the Office of the Deputy Chief of Staff for Plans and Programs, Headquarters U.S. Air Force, as deputy assistant director of plans where he functioned as the Air Force planner in the Joint Chiefs of Staff. Later, he became the assistant director of plans for joint matters, with responsibility for the preparation of Joint Chiefs of Staff Air Force positions for consideration of the chief of staff.

In February 1963 he became the director of the policy planning staff, Office of the Assistant Secretary of Defense, International Security Affairs. In this assignment, he was the head of staff of defense department planners, both civilian and military, who participated in the drafting of political/military plans.

In August 1965 he began a three-year tour of duty as deputy for plans and operations, Pacific Air Forces, in which capacity he participated in the planning and direction of the air campaign against North Vietnam. He left Hawaii in June 1968 to become assistant deputy chief of staff for plans and operations, Headquarters U.S. Air Force.

In August 1969 he joined the Organization of the Joint Chiefs of Staff as director for operations (J-3). On July 20, 1970, he became director of the Joint Staff, a position he held until April 7, 1972, when he was promoted to general.

He assumed duty as commander, Seventh Air Force (PACAF), and deputy commander, U.S. Military Assistance Command, Vietnam, on April 10, 1972, replacing General John D. Lavelle who had been forced to resign. Vogt was responsible for air operations in Southeast Asia for the last eighteen months of United States combat activity. With the cease-fire in Vietnam he became the commander of the U.S. Support Activities Group in Thailand which conducted all U.S. air activities in Laos and Cambodia until U.S. combat involvement ceased in August 1973. He became commander in chief of Pacific Air Forces on October 1, 1973, and assumed command of Allied Air Forces Central Europe and United States Air Forces in Europe in June 1974. He is the only officer to have been commander in chief of both the U.S. Pacific and European Air Forces.

He retired from the Air Force on August 31, 1975.

He died on April 16, 2010.

He was interred at Arlington National Cemetery in Section 59, Site 4224.

== Aerial victory credits ==
Chronicle of aerial victories
Date	#	Type	Location	Aircraft flown	Unit Assigned
August 19, 1943	1	Messerschmitt Bf 109	Walcheren, Netherlands	Republic P-47C Thunderbolt	63 FS, 56 FG
October 4, 1943	1	Messerschmitt Bf 110	Düren, Germany	P-47C	63 FS, 56 FG
October 20, 1943	1	Focke Wulf Fw 190	unknown	P-47C	63 FS, 56 FG
February 21, 1944	1	Bf 110	Münster, Germany	Republic P-47D Thunderbolt	63 FS, 56 FG
February 22, 1944	1	Bf 110	Paderborn, Germany	P-47D	63 FS, 56 FG
May 19, 1944	1	Fw 190	Celle, Germany	P-47D	360 FS, 356 FG
August 4, 1944	2	Bf 109	Hamburg, Germany	P-47D	360 FS, 356 FG

SOURCES: Air Force Historical Study 85: USAF Credits for the Destruction of Enemy Aircraft, World War II

== Awards and decorations ==
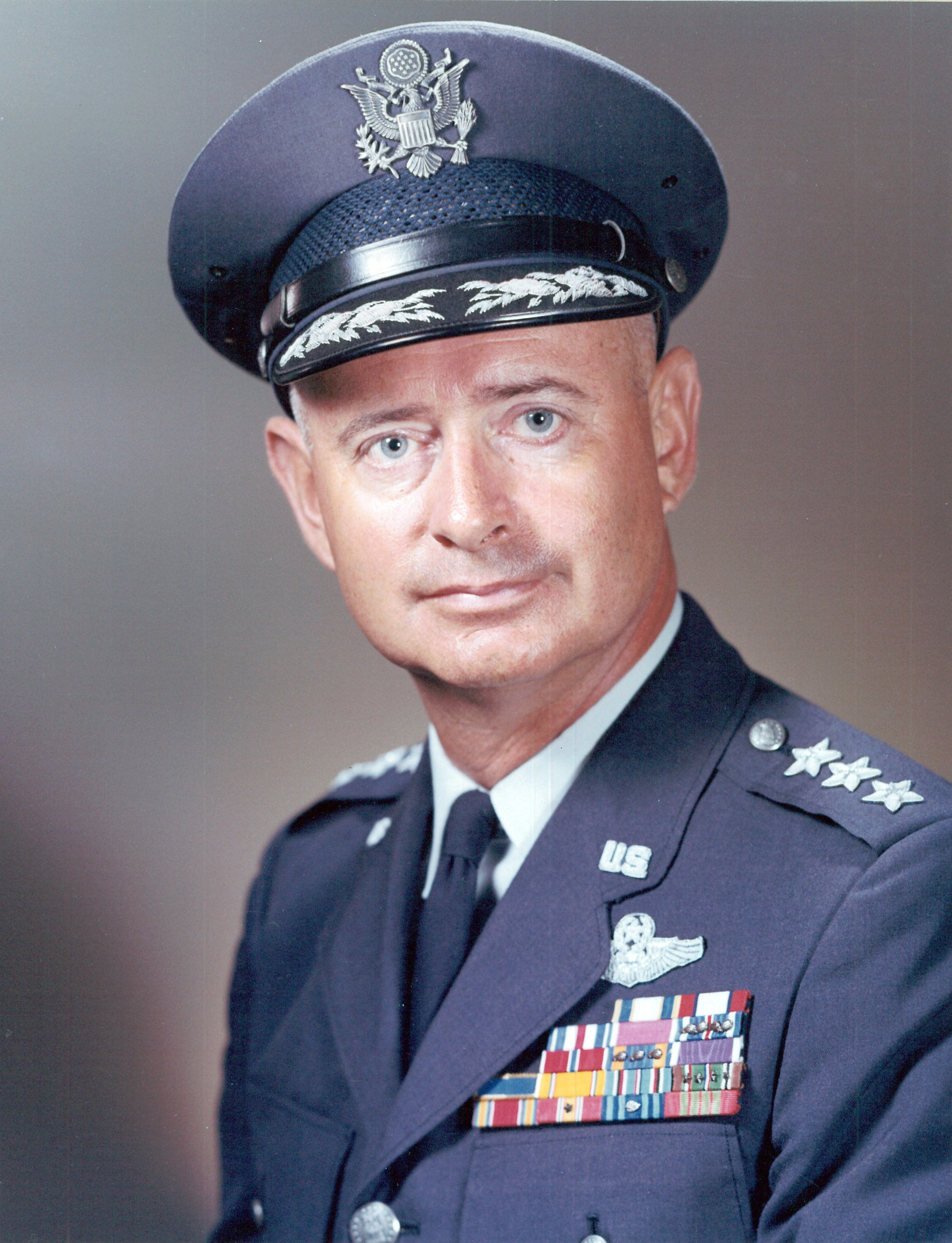
General John W. Vogt Jr.

His military decorations and awards include:

US Air Force Command Pilot Badge

Air Force Distinguished Service Medal with three bronze oak leaf clusters
Army Distinguished Service Medal
Silver Star
Legion of Merit
Distinguished Flying Cross with four oak leaf clusters
Bronze Star
Air Medal with three oak leaf clusters
Joint Service Commendation Medal
Army Commendation Medal
Purple Heart
Air Force Presidential Unit Citation
American Defense Service Medal
European-African-Middle Eastern Campaign Medal with four bronze service stars
World War II Victory Medal
National Defense Service Medal with service star
Vietnam Service Medal with service star
Air Force Longevity Service Award with silver and two bronze oak leaf clusters
Croix de Guerre 1939–1945 (France) with silver-gilt star
National Order of Vietnam, Commander
Vietnamese Cross of Gallantry with palm
Vietnam Air Service Medal
Order of the Cloud and Banner, 1st class (Republic of China)

Vogt was the 1973 recipient of the General H.H. Arnold Award of the Arnold Air Society in recognition of outstanding contributions to military aviation and aerospace progress.

== See also ==
- List of commanders of USAFE
