= James L. Jamerson =

United States Air Force general

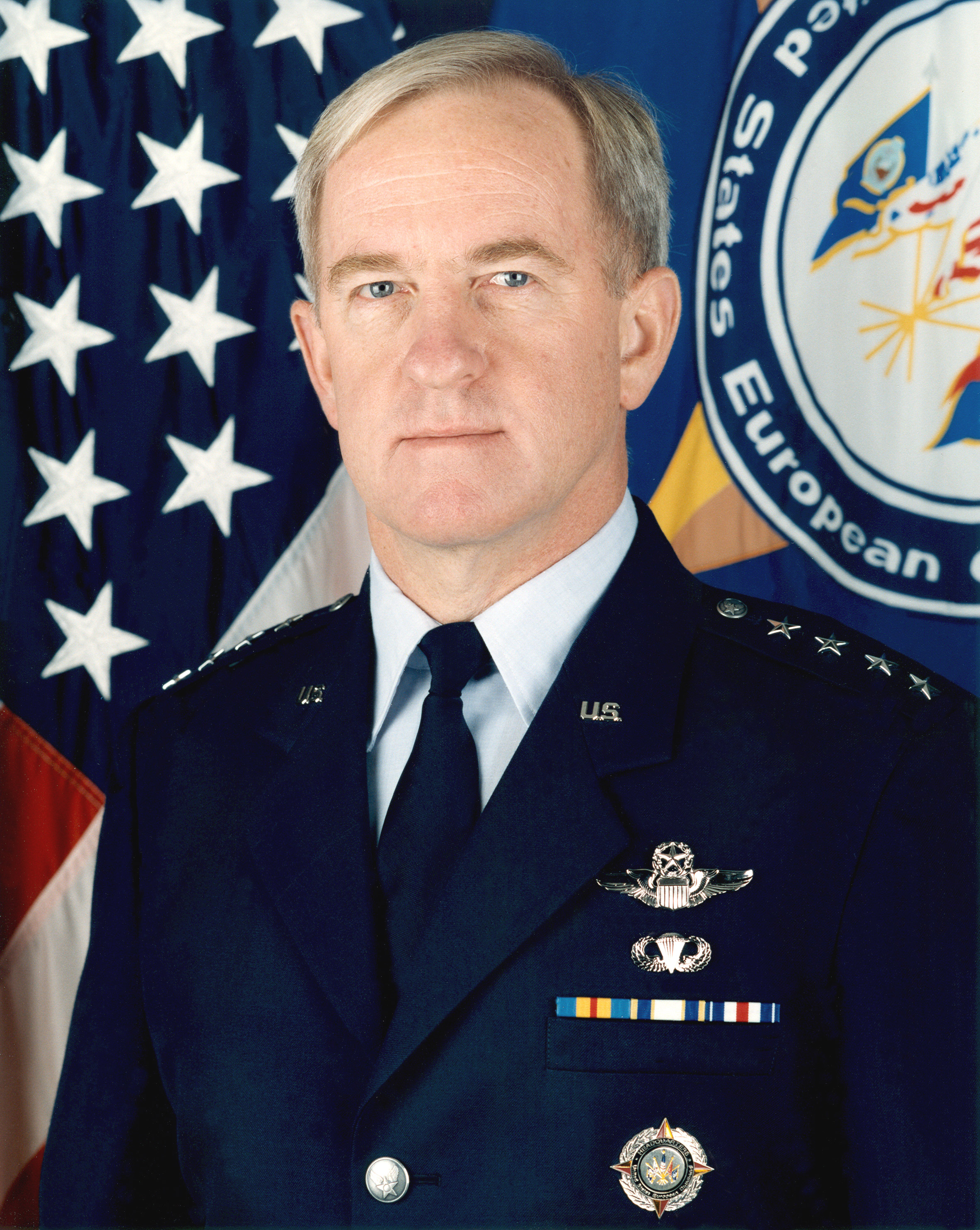
- Official portrait
- Born: January 29, 1941 (age 85); Chapel Hill, North Carolina
- Military career
- Allegiance: United States
- Branch: United States Air Force
- Service years: 1963–1998
- Rank: General
- Commands: 354th Tactical Fighter Wing; 23rd Tactical Fighter Wing; 56th Tactical Training Wing; 12th Air Force; United States Southern Command Air Forces; United States Air Forces in Europe; United States European Command
- Conflicts: Cold War; Vietnam War

James L. Jamerson (born January 29, 1941) is a retired four-star general in the United States Air Force (USAF). His last assignment before retirement was as the Deputy Commander in Chief, United States European Command from 1995 to 1998.

== Biography ==
=== Early life ===
The general was born and raised in Chapel Hill, North Carolina, and entered the Air Force in 1963 following graduation from the United States Air Force Academy. Beginning in May 1963 and going to August 1964, he was a student in pilot training at Webb Air Force Base, Texas. He then was an instructor in the T-38 Talon at Webb until December, 1967. From December until May, 1968, he was a student of A-1E Skyraider training at Hurlburt Field, Florida. From May until June 1969, he was an A-1E close air support and search and combat rescue pilot, 602nd Air Commando Squadron, Udorn Royal Thai Air Force Base and Nakhon Phanom Royal Thai Air Force Base, Thailand. He later was an AT-33 Shooting Star fighter lead-in instructor pilot, later, A-7D Corsair II pilot, 354th Tactical Fighter Wing, Myrtle Beach Air Force Base, South Carolina from June 1969 to August 1971.

From August 1971 and going for the next year, he was a student at the Air Command and Staff College, Maxwell Air Force Base, Alabama. For the next four years, he was a staff officer, Operational Requirements and Contingency Plans Division, Headquarters Pacific Air Forces, Hickam Air Force Base, Hawaii. Starting in August 1976 and going to June 1981, he was an A-7D Corsair II aircraft commander; chief of safety; squadron operations officer; squadron commander, and assistant deputy commander for operations, for the 23rd Tactical Fighter Wing, England Air Force Base, Louisiana.

=== Later career ===
Jim became a student at the Air Force Institute of Technology, Georgetown University, Washington D.C. from June 1981 to August 1982. Right after graduation, he was assigned as Chief of Pacific, Middle East and Africa Policy Division, Directorate of International Programs, Headquarters United States Air Force, Washington D.C. until July 1984. His following assignment was as Vice Commander, 354th Tactical Fighter Wing at Myrtle Beach Air Force Base, South Carolina until May 1985. From May 1985 to February 1987, he was the Commander of the 23rd Tactical Fighter Wing at England Air Force Base, Louisiana. He then became the commander of the 56th Tactical Training Wing at MacDill Air Force Base, Florida until January 1989.

From January 1989 to November 1991, he served as the assistant Deputy Chief of Staff for Operations, and later, the Deputy Chief of Staff for Operations, Headquarters United States Air Forces in Europe, Ramstein Air Base, Germany. Following those positions, General Jamerson was assigned as the Assistant Chief of Staff for Operations, Supreme Headquarters Allied Powers Europe in Mons, Belgium from November 1991 to August 1992. Beginning in August 1992 and going until July 1993, he was the Vice Commander in Chief, Headquarters United States Air Forces in Europe, back at Ramstein AB. For the next year, he was the Commander of the 12th Air Force and United States Southern Command Air Forces at Davis-Monthan Air Force Base, Arizona. For the year after that, he became the Commander of the United States Air Forces in Europe, and Allied Forces Central Europe, also at Ramstein. His final military assignment was as the Deputy Commander in Chief, United States European Command, Stuttgart-Vaihingen, Germany from July 1995 until his retirement on 1 September 1998.

Jamerson is a member of the U.S. Global Leadership Coalition National Security Advisory Council.

== Awards ==
Awards earned over his career:

- Defense Distinguished Service Medal with oak leaf cluster
- Air Force Distinguished Service Medal with oak leaf cluster
- Silver Star
- Legion of Merit with an oak leaf cluster
- Distinguished Flying Cross with two oak leaf clusters
- Meritorious Service Medal with an oak leaf cluster
- Air Medal with eleven oak leaf clusters
- Vietnam Service Medal with four bronze service stars
- Republic of Vietnam Campaign Medal
- Order of the Sword
- Command pilot with more than 5,000 flying hours
- Parachutist

== Dates of Promotion ==
Dates at which he was promoted:

- Second Lieutenant: June 5, 1963
- First Lieutenant: December 5, 1964
- Captain: March 10, 1967
- Major: January 1, 1972
- Lieutenant Colonel: November 1, 1977
- Colonel: June 1, 1981
- Brigadier General: February 1, 1988
- Major General: August 1, 1990
- Lieutenant General: August 1, 1992
- General: September 1, 1994

== See also ==
- List of commanders of USAFE
