= Phoneme Media =

Los Angeles-based nonprofit publishing house

- Parent company: Deep Vellum
- Founded: 2013
- Founders: Brian Hewes and David Shook
- Country of origin: United States
- Headquarters location: Los Angeles
- Publication types: Books
- Fiction genres: Works in translation
- Official website: www.phonememedia.org

Phoneme Media is a Los Angeles–based nonprofit publishing house sponsored by PEN Center USA. Phoneme was founded in 2013 by translators Brian Hewes and David Shook. The aim of the company was to increase the availability of books and videos from countries and languages underrepresented in English translation. In 2019, Phoneme was acquired by Deep Vellum Publishing.

== Notable authors ==
- David Avidan
- Mario Bellatin
- Mohsen Emadi
- Natalia Toledo
- Roberto Castillo Udiarte
- Rocío Cerón

== Source languages ==
- Icelandic
- Lingala
- Spanish
- Tsotsil
- Yucatec Maya
- Zapotec
- Zoque
- Hebrew
