= Willie Evans (footballer, born 1912) =

Welsh footballer

Personal information
- Full name: William Evans
- Date of birth: 7 November 1912
- Place of birth: Waunllwyd, Ebbw Vale, Wales
- Date of death: 22 July 1976 (aged 63)
- Place of death: Ponders End, England
- Height: 5 ft 6 in (1.68 m)
- Position: Outside left

Senior career*
Years	Team	Apps	(Gls)
	Tottenham Juniors	?	(?)
	Barnet	?	(?)
	Hayward Juniors	?	(?)
1930–1931	Cardiff City	0	(0)
1931–1936	Tottenham Hotspur	178	(78)
1937–?	Fulham	0	(0)

International career
1932–1936	Wales	6	(1)
- * Club domestic league appearances and goals

William Evans (7 November 1912 – 22 July 1976) was a Welsh professional footballer who played for Cardiff City, Tottenham Hotspur, Fulham and represented Wales on six occasions.

== Football career ==
Evans was born in Waun-Lwyd and joined Spurs from Cardiff in 1931 after spells with Tottenham Juniors, Barnet and Hayward Sports.

Between 1931 and 1936 the outside left played a total of 195 matches and netting 86 goals in all competitions for the White Hart Lane club. The Welshman scored twice on his 'Lilywhites' debut in a 6-2 victory over Swansea City at White Hart Lane in November 1931 in the old Second Division.

Evans joined Fulham in 1937 and ended his football career at Craven Cottage.

== Career statistics ==
=== International ===
Appearances and goals by national team and year
National team	Year	Apps	Goals
Wales	1932	1	0
Wales	1933	2	1
Wales	1934	1	0
Wales	1936	2	0
Total		6	1

Wales score listed first, score column indicates score after each Evans goal

List of international goals scored by Willie Evans
No.	Date	Venue	Cap	Opponent	Score	Result	Competition	Ref.
1	4 October 1933	Ninian Park, Cardiff, Wales	2	Scotland	1–0	3–2	1933–34 British Home Championship	
