= Will Evans (rugby league) =

Wales international rugby league player

Personal information
- Full name: William Evans
- Born: 4 May 2001 (age 24) Australia
- Height: 5 ft 10 in (1.77 m)
- Weight: 14 st 5 lb (91 kg)

Playing information
- Position: Centre
Club
Years	Team	Pld	T	G	FG	P
2022	Whitehaven RLFC	26	8	0	0	32
2023	Widnes Vikings	0	0	0	0	0
2024	Whitehaven RLFC	24	5	0	0	20
2025	Workington Town	6	3	0	0	12
	Total	56	16	0	0	64
Representative
Years	Team	Pld	T	G	FG	P
2022	Wales	2	0	0	0	0
- Source: As of 8 March 2026

Will Evans (born 4 May 2001) is a Wales international rugby league footballer who last played as a centre for Workington Town in the RFL League 1.

He previously played for Widnes Vikings in the Championship.

== Background ==
Evans was born in Australia. He is of Welsh descent.

== Playing career ==
=== Burleigh Bears ===
Evans played in 1 games for the Burleigh Bears in the 2020 Queensland Cup.

=== Whitehaven RLFC ===
In the 2022 season he made 26 appearances and scored eight tries for Whitehaven.

=== Widnes Vikings ===
On 12 October 2022 it was announced that he had signed a one-year deal with the Widnes Vikings.

=== Whitehaven RLFC (rejoin) ===
On 4 Oct 2023 it was reported that he had rejoined Whitehaven RLFC on a 2-year deal.

=== Workington Town ===
He signed for Workington Town in the RFL League 1 before the start of the 2025 season. After just 6 games, he requested release from his contract to return to Australia for personal reasons.

=== International career ===
Evans played for Wales at the 2019 Rugby League World Cup 9s.

He made his full international debut in June 2022 against France at the Stadium Municipal d'Albi in Albi.

In 2022 Evans was named in the Wales squad for the 2021 Rugby League World Cup.
