= Edward Evans =

Edward Evans or Ted Evans may refer to:

== Arts and academia ==
- Edward Evans (actor) (1914–2001), British actor
- Edward Evan (1716–1798), Welsh poet, sometimes known as Edward Evans
- Edward Payson Evans (1831–1917), American scholar and linguist

== Politics and government ==
- Edward Evans (British politician) (1883–1960), British Labour Party politician
- Edward Evans (Newfoundland politician) (1819–1898), Newfoundland merchant and politician
- Edward Gurney Evans (1907–1987), politician in Manitoba, Canada
- Edward J. Evans (1871–1928), American labor unionist
- Ed Evans (born 1959), member of the West Virginia House of Delegates
- Ted Evans (politician) (1939–1981), Australian politician
- Ted Evans (public servant) (1941–2020), Australian public servant and businessman

== Religion ==
- Edward Evans (divine) (1573–?), English divine
- Edward Lewis Evans (bishop) (1904–1996), Bishop of Barbados

== Sport ==
- Eddie Evans (born 1964), Canadian rugby union player
- Ted Evans (footballer) (1868–1942), English footballer
- Ted Evans (cricketer) (1849–1921), Australian cricketer

== Others ==
- Edward Evans (c. 1948–1965), victim of the Moors murders in England
- Edward Evans (printseller) (1789–1835), printseller and compositor in London
- Edward Evans, 1st Baron Mountevans (1880–1957), British naval officer and Antarctic explorer
- Edward B. Evans (1846–1922), British philatelist and army officer
- Edward P. Evans (1942–2010), American heir, businessman, investor, horse breeder and philanthropist
- Edward De Lacy Evans (1830?–1901), servant, blacksmith and gold miner, revealed as assigned female at birth

== See also ==
- E. E. Evans-Pritchard (1902–1973), British anthropologist
- Edwin Evans (disambiguation)
