= Anthony Wilson =

Anthony or Tony Wilson may refer to:

== Anthony Wilson ==
- Anthony Wilson (musician) (born 1968), jazz guitarist and composer
  - Anthony Wilson (album), 1997
- Anthony Wilson (sprinter) (born 1968), Canadian sprinter
- Anthony Wilson (MP), British politician during 1850s
- Anthony Wilson (American politician), member of the Georgia House of Representatives
- Anthony Babington Wilson (born 1931), business executive, artist and author
- Sir Anthony Wilson (accountant) (1928–2012), English accountant and civil servant
- Deke Arlon, musician/manager, born Anthony Howard Wilson
- Henry Bromley (writer) (1750–1814), real name Anthony Wilson, writer on art
- A. Dash Wilson (1898–?), Liberian politician

== Tony Wilson ==
- Tony Wilson (1950–2007), TV presenter, co-founder of Factory Records
- Tony Wilson (boxer) (born 1964), British boxer
- Sir Tony Wilson, 6th Baronet (1935–2019), British Army officer
- Tony Wilson (musician) (1936–2026), member of Hot Chocolate
- Tony Wilson (radio presenter), Australian author and radio presenter, 2000s
