= 1988 New Year Honours =

British royal recognitions

The New Year Honours 1988 were appointments by most of the Commonwealth realms of Queen Elizabeth II to various orders and honours to reward and highlight good works by citizens of those countries, and honorary ones to citizens of other countries. They were announced on 31 December 1987 to celebrate the year passed and mark the beginning of 1988 in the United Kingdom, Australia, New Zealand, Mauritius, the Bahamas, Grenada, Papua New Guinea, the Solomon Islands, Saint Lucia, Saint Vincent and the Grenadines, Belize, Antigua and Barbuda, and Gibraltar.

The recipients of honours are displayed here as they were styled before their new honour, and arranged by honour, with classes (Knight, Knight Grand Cross, etc.) and then divisions (Military, Civil, etc.) as appropriate.

== United Kingdom ==
=== Life Peer ===
Barons

- Sir Robert Temple Armstrong, GCB, CVO, lately Secretary of the Cabinet and Head of the Home Civil Service.
- The Right Honourable Sir John Francis Donaldson, Master of the Rolls.
- Rabbi Sir Immanuel Jakobovits, Chief Rabbi of the United Hebrew Congregation of the British Commonwealth of Nations.

=== Privy Counsellor ===
- The Honourable Peter Leonard Brooke, MP, Minister of State, HM Treasury. Member of Parliament, the City of London and Westminster South.
- Antony Harold Newton, OBE, MP, Minister for Health. Member of Parliament, Braintree.
- Cranley Gordon Douglas Onslow, MP, Member of Parliament, Woking.

=== Knight Bachelor ===
- Richard Stanley Barratt, CBE, QPM, H.M. Chief Inspector of Constabulary.
- Edgar Philip Beck, chairman, John Mowlem & Co. plc.
- Christopher John Benson. For public services.
- Alan Bowness, CBE, Director, Tate Gallery.
- Michael Harris Caine, chairman, Booker plc.
- Commander Ian Tofts Campbell, VRD, CBE. For political and public service.
- John Seton Cassels, CB, Director General, National Economic Development Office.
- Alan Hugh Cook, Jacksonian Professor of Natural Philosophy and Master of Selwyn College, Cambridge.
- (Thomas) Henry Cotton, MBE. For services to Golf.
- Professor Henry Clifford Darby, CBE. For services to the study of Historical Geography.
- Paul Girolami, chairman, Glaxo Holdings plc.
- Alexander John Gordon, CBE, Senior Partner, Alex Gordon Partnership.
- Anthony Herbert Grabham, Consultant Surgeon, Kettering and District General Hospital.
- Kenneth Green, Director, Manchester Polytechnic.
- Simon Michael Hornby, Director and chairman, W. H. Smith and Son Holdings Ltd. Chairman, The Design Council.
- David Anthony Jacobs. For political service.
- Antony Rupert Jay. For political and public service.
- John Patrick Grosvenor Lawrence, CBE. For political and public service.
- Hugh Frank John Leggatt, Art Dealer, Member of the Museums and Galleries Commission.
- John Warren Loveridge. For political and public service.
- David Neil Macfarlane, MP. For political service
- Donald Murdo McCallum, CBE, DL. For services to Industry and Education in Scotland.
- The Honourable Charles Andrew Morrison, MP. For political service.
- Kenneth Gordon Oxford, CBE, QPM, Chief Constable, Merseyside Police.
- Ralph Harry Robins, managing director, Rolls-Royce plc.
- Frank Jarvis Rogers, chairman, EMAP plc.
- Maurice Shock, lately Vice-Chancellor, University of Leicester.
- John Lindsay Eric Smith, CBE, chairman, Landmark Trust.
- James Wilton Spicer, MP. For political service.
- Ernest Sanderson Temple, MBE, QC, (His Honour Judge Temple), Recorder of Liverpool.
- Professor Bernard Evans Tomlinson, CBE, chairman, Northern Regional Health Authority.
- Harry Anthony Wheeler, OBE, President, Royal Scottish Academy.
- Anthony Wilson, Head of Government Accountancy Service and Accounting Adviser to HM Treasury.

Diplomatic Service and Overseas List

- Mr. Justice Yang Ti-liang, Chief Justice-designate, Hong Kong.

=== Order of the Bath ===
==== Knight Grand Cross of the Order of the Bath (GCB) ====
Military Division

- Air Chief Marshal Sir Peter Harding, KCB, Royal Air Force.

Civil Division

- Sir Brian (David) Hayes, KCB, Permanent Secretary, Department of Trade and Industry.

==== Dame Commander of the Order of the Bath (DCB) ====
Civil Division

- Anne Elisabeth Mueller, CB, Second Permanent Secretary, HM Treasury.

==== Knight Commander of the Order of the Bath (KCB) ====
Military Division

- Lieutenant General John Martin Carruthers Garrod, OBE, Royal Marines.
- Lieutenant General Peter Edgar de la Cour de la Billière, CBE, DSO, MC, (424859), late The Light Infantry Colonel Commandant The Light Division.
- Lieutenant General Peter Anthony Inge (448984), late The Green Howards Colonel The Green Howards (Alexandra, Princess of Wales's Own Yorkshire Regiment), Colonel Commandant Corps of Royal Military Police.
- Lieutenant General John James Stibbon, OBE, (437174), late Corps of Royal Engineers, Colonel Commandant Corps of Royal Engineers, Colonel Commandant Royal Army Pay Corps, Colonel Commandant Royal Pioneer Corps.

Civil Division

- Frederick Edward Robin Butler, CVO, Second Permanent Secretary, HM Treasury.

==== Companion of the Order of the Bath (CB) ====
Military Division

Royal Navy

- Rear Admiral Gilbert Archibald Ford Hitchens.
- Rear Admiral Robin Ivor Trower Hogg.
- Rear Admiral Anthony Wheatley.

Army

- Major General Edwin Horace Alexander Beckett, MBE, (454977), late The Prince of Wales's Own Regiment of Yorkshire.
- Major General Gerald Brian Berragan (433719), late Royal Army Ordnance Corps.
- Brigadier Andrew Dewe Myrtle, CBE, ADC, (430393), late The King's Own Scottish Borderers.
- Major General Christopher Noel Thompson (427012), late Corps of Royal Engineers, Colonel Commandant Corps of Royal Engineers.

Royal Air Force

- Air Vice-Marshal Ronald Dick.
- Air Vice-Marshal Barry Hamilton Newton, OBE.
- Air Vice-Marshal James Donald Spottiswood, CVO, AFC.

Civil Division

- James Geoffrey Ashcroft, Deputy Under Secretary of State, Ministry of Defence.
- Daniel Barry, Permanent Secretary, Department of the Environment, Northern Ireland.
- Professor Ernest Arthur Bell, Director, Royal Botanic Gardens, Kew.
- John Roger Bickford Smith, TD, Senior Master, Queen's Bench Division.
- Roger James Dawe, OBE, Deputy Secretary, Department of Employment.
- Edward Peter Kemp, Deputy Secretary, HM Treasury
- Neville Frank Ledsome, Under Secretary, Department of Trade and Industry.
- Barbara Haig MacGibbon, Senior Principal Medical Officer, Department of Health and Social Security.
- George Leeke McLoughlin, lately deputy director of Public Prosecutions, Northern Ireland.
- Michael John Moriarty, Deputy Under Secretary of State, Home Office.
- Howard David Myland, Deputy Comptroller and Auditor General, National Audit Office.
- John Peters, Under Secretary, Ministry of Defence.
- William Howard Guest Rees, Chief Veterinary Officer, Ministry of Agriculture, Fisheries and Food.
- James Archibald Scott, LVO, Secretary, Scottish Education Department.
- John Williams Stevens, Under Secretary, Cabinet Office.
- John Handby Thompson, Under Secretary, Department of Education and Science.
- James Henry Willcox, Clerk of Public Bills, House of Commons.

=== Order of Saint Michael and Saint George ===
==== Knight Grand Cross of the Order of St Michael and St George (GCMG) ====
- The Right Honourable Thomas Edward, Baron Bridges, KCMG, lately HM Ambassador, Rome.

==== Knight Commander of the Order of St Michael and St George (KCMG) ====
- Michael O'Donal Bjarne Alexander, CMG, United Kingdom Permanent Representative on the North Atlantic Council.
- Stephen Loftus Egerton, CMG, HM Ambassador, Riyadh.
- Leslie Fielding, lately Director-General for External Relations, Commission of the European Communities, Brussels.
- Christopher Leslie George Mallaby, CMG, HM Ambassador-designate, Bonn.

==== Companion of the Order of St Michael and St George (CMG) ====
- Margaret Bryan, HM Ambassador, Panama City.
- Robert Linklater Burke Cormack, HM Ambassador, Kinshasa.
- John Michael Crosby, LVO, lately British High Commissioner, Belmopan.
- Emrys Thomas Davies, HM Ambassador, Hanoi.
- Barrie Charles Gane, OBE, Foreign and Commonwealth Office.
- David Arthur Steuart Gladstone, British High Commissioner, Colombo.
- Peter Robert Mossom Hinchcliffe, CVO, HM Ambassador, Kuwait.
- Colin Garth Mays, British High Commissioner, Nassau.
- Keith Elliott Hedley Morris, HM Consul-General, Milan.
- Arthur Jeffrey Payne, British High Commissioner, Kingston.
- John Peter Scott Taylor, lately Special Adviser for Human Rights, European Parliament, Luxembourg.
- John Michael Willson, British High Commissioner-designate, Lusaka.

=== Royal Victorian Order ===
==== Knight Grand Cross of the Royal Victorian Order (GCVO) ====
- Marshal of the Royal Air Force Sir John Grandy, GCB, KBE, DSO.

==== Knight Commander of the Royal Victorian Order (KCVO) ====
- Gerrard Charles Peat.
- Very Reverend Alan Brunskill Webster.
- Harold Haywood, OBE, DL.

==== Commander of the Royal Victorian Order (CVO) ====
- Dr. James Ewart Henderson.
- Robert Heron.
- Dr. (Francis) John Long.
- David Henry Maitland.
- His Honour Andrew James Blackett-Ord.
- Lieutenant Colonel George Arthur Alston-Roberts-West.
- Group Captain Alan Marcus Wills, OBE.
- Ronald Winford.

==== Lieutenant of the Royal Victorian Order (LVO) ====
- Lieutenant Colonel Donald Clayton Barter, CD.
- Keith Lynden Brown.
- Pearl Leoni Kathleen Clark.
- Dr. Peter Macdonald Crawford.
- Captain Charles Roderick Curwen, OBE.
- Lieutenant Colonel James Eagles.
- Edith Mary Fisher, MVO, BEM.
- Commander Beresford Victor Charles Reeves, Royal Navy.
- David Edwin Walker, MVO.

==== Member of the Royal Victorian Order (MVO) ====
- John David Bond.
- Inspector David Robert Comben, Metropolitan Police.
- Eileen Mary Ferguson.
- Lieutenant Commander William Barry Kirby, Royal Navy.
- Eileen Blanche Searle.
- Colin Adair Sherman Sturmer.
- Gillian Irene Wickham.
- Lee Williams.

==== Medal of the Royal Victorian Order (RVM) ====
In Silver

- Raymond Frederick Bridges.
- G42744391 Flight Sergeant John Benjamin Buck, Royal Air Force.
- William Leslie Day.
- Corporal of Horse Colin Ernest Dean (19058941), The Life Guards.
- David Hugh Farrow.
- Neville Gordon Farrow.
- T8068910 Chief Technician Terence Michael Fry, Royal Air Force.
- Zoe Clare Hudson.
- Jean-Marc Lautier.
- Peter Edward Loose.
- Christopher Harry Marlow.
- Arthur Petrie.
- Alexis Guerry Polhill.
- John Preston.
- Leslie Charles Spong.
- Local Acting Chief Marine Engineering Mechanic (Electrical) John Kenneth Turner (D1011355F), Royal Navy.

=== Order of the Companions of Honour (CH) ===
- Anthony Dymoke Powell, CBE, Author.

=== Order of the British Empire ===
==== Dame Commander of the Order of the British Empire (DBE) ====
Civil Division

- Barbara Evelyn Clayton, CBE, (Mrs. W. Klyne), Professor of Chemical Pathology and Human Metabolism, University of Southampton.
- Judith Olivia Dench, OBE, (Mrs. Michael Williams), Actress.
- (Mary) Elaine Kellett-Bowman, MP. For political service.

==== Knight Commander of the Order of the British Empire (KBE) ====
Military Division

- Lieutenant General John Peter Barry Condliffe Watts, CB, CBE, MC, (415012), late The Royal Irish Rangers (27th (Inniskilling) 83rd and 87th).

Civil Division

- David Robert Ford, LVO, OBE, Chief Secretary, Hong Kong.

==== Commander of the Order of the British Empire (CBE) ====
Military Division

Royal Navy

- Captain Neil Christopher Baird-Murray, Royal Navy.
- Commandant Marjorie Helen Fletcher, ADC, Women's Royal Naval Service.
- Captain Neil Anthony Douglas Grant, Royal Navy.
- Captain Graham Francis Laslett, Royal Navy.

Army

- Brigadier Samuel Cowan, OBE, (474845), late Royal Corps of Signals.
- Colonel William Telford Dennison, OBE, (445837), late Corps of Royal Engineers.
- Colonel Francis Farquharson Gibb (463341), late The Royal Scots (The Royal Regiment).
- Colonel John Henry McKeown (480880), late Corps of Royal Engineers.
- Brigadier Paul David Orchard-Lisle, TD, ADC, (452125), late Royal Regiment of Artillery, Territorial Army.
- Brigadier Michael John Paterson (422321), Army Catering Corps.

Royal Air Force

- Air Commodore Michael John Allisstone, Royal Air Force.
- Group Captain Peter Langridge Harris, Royal Auxiliary Air Force.
- Air Commodore David Frank Lawrence, OBE, Royal Air Force.
- Group Captain Graeme Alan Robertson, OBE, Royal Air Force.
- Air Commodore John Frederick Boon, Royal Air Force.

Civil Division

- John Derek Allen, Chairman, Cwmbran Development Corporation.
- Kenneth Albert Allen, lately Director General of Printing and Publishing, Her Majesty's Stationery Office.
- Kenneth Henry Albert Allen, Grade 4, Department of the Environment.
- John Alistair Alston, Vice-Chairman, Norfolk County Council.
- Peter William Barker, Chairman and Chief Executive, J. H. Fenner (Holdings) plc. For services to Export.
- Bryan Ronald Basset. For services to Royal Ordnance plc.
- John Charles Brocklehurst, Professor of Geriatric Medicine, University of Manchester.
- Ronald Alfred Bullers, QFSM, Chief Fire Officer, London Fire and Civil Defence Authority.
- Sherban Cantacuzino, Secretary, Royal Fine Arts Commission.
- William Montgomery Carson. For services to Commerce and Industry in Northern Ireland.
- Douglas Anthony Chamberlain, Consultant Cardiologist and Consultant Physician, Royal Sussex County Hospital.
- Edwina Olwyn Coven, Chief Commoner, City of London.
- Professor Charles Donald Cowan, Director, School of Oriental and African Studies, University of London.
- Alan George Cox, Chief Executive, Allied Steel and Wire Holdings plc.
- Colin Denzil Coxhead, lately Professional and Technology Directing B, Ministry of Defence.
- Peter John Cropper. For political service.
- William Martindale Darling, OBE, Chairman, South Tyneside Health Authority.
- Professor Gordon Donaldson. For services to Scottish History.
- David John Downham, MBE, Chairman, West Dorset Health Authority.
- Kenneth James Doyle, Grade 5, Department of Trade and Industry.
- Robert Geoffrey Edwards, Professor of Human Reproduction, University of Cambridge.
- Bruce John Elliott, TD, lately Secretary and Treasurer, The Association of County Court and District Registrars.
- Denholm Mitchell Elliott, Actor.
- Gordon Haig Emery. For political and public service.
- Christopher Harris Doyle Everett, Headmaster, Tonbridge School, Kent.
- Roger Arthur Farrance, Member, Electricity Council.
- Dennis Lowndes Flower, DL. For political and public service.
- Alan Campbell Frood, Managing Director, Crown Agents.
- John Fry, OBE. For services to General Practice,
- Henderson Alexander (Sandy) Gall, Foreign Correspondent and Newscaster, Independent Television News.
- Colin Simister Gaskell, Managing Director, Marconi Instruments Ltd.
- John Gibb, OBE, Chairman, Borders Health Board.
- Alexander Grant Gordon, Chairman and Managing Director, William Grant and Sons Ltd.
- Robert Gray, Lord Provost, Glasgow City Council.
- David Grieves, Board Member and Managing Director, Personnel and Social Policy, British Steel Corporation.
- Reginald Edward Hawke Hadingham, OBE, MC, TD, Chairman, All England Lawn Tennis and Croquet Club.
- Robert James Hanna, OBE, Chairman, Ulster Countryside Committee.
- Robin David Ronald Harris. For political and public service.
- Donald Leslie Haxby, Veterinary Surgeon.
- Bernard Vere Henderson, Chairman, Anglian Water Authority.
- Robert Aubrey Hinde, Royal Society Research Professor, University of Cambridge.
- Andrew Law Howie, Chairman, Scottish Milk Marketing Board.
- Henry Holman Hunt, Deputy Chairman, Monopolies and Mergers Commission.
- Cecil Alfred Johnson, Secretary and Scientific Director, British Pharmacopoeia Commission.
- (John) Raymond Johnstone, Chairman and Managing Director, Murray Johnstone Ltd.
- George Briscoe Jones, Director, Co-operative Development Agency.
- Jane Isabel Jones, Director of Information and Regional Nursing Officer, West Midlands Regional Health Authority.
- Roger Alwyne Juggins. For political and public service.
- James Kincade, Principal, Methodist College Belfast.
- Derek John Kingsbury, Group Chief Executive, Fairey Group Ltd.
- David Donald Kirby, Member, British Railways Board.
- Bryan David Langton, Director, Bass plc. Chairman, Bass plc International Hotels Division.
- Percy Livingstone, Vice Chairman, Royal Naval Film Corporation.
- Brenda Margaret Lowe. For political service.
- John Newcombe Maltby, Chairman, The Burmah Oil plc.
- Denis Victor Mardle, Grade 5, Foreign and Commonwealth Office.
- George Henry Martin. For services to the British Record Industry.
- David Slesser McCall, Chief Executive, Anglia Television Ltd.
- James Black McGillivray McKean, Registrar, Capital Taxes Office, Scotland, Board of Inland Revenue.
- Geoffrey Daniel McLean, QPM, Assistant Commissioner, Metropolitan Police.
- Thomas Jaffrey McNair, President, Royal College of Surgeons of Edinburgh.
- David John McNeil, lately President, Law Society of Scotland.
- Philip David Merridale, Chairman, Education Committee, Hampshire County Council.
- Edward Miller, Director of Education, Strathclyde Regional Council.
- Frank Leslie Morgan, MBE. For public service in Wales.
- John Orwin Morris, County Education Officer, Essex.
- Gareth John Jarvis Neale. For political and public service.
- John Hallam Mercer Norris, lately President, Country Landowners' Association.
- John William Parsons, Chairman and Chief Executive, Time and Data Systems International Ltd. Member, The British Overseas Trade Board. For services to Export.
- John Edgar Norris Peters, MBE. For political and public service.
- Charles Edward Pugh, lately Managing Director, National Nuclear Corporation Ltd.
- Edward Ernest Ray, Senior Partner, Spicer & Pegler.
- Barry St George Austin Reed, MC, DL, Chairman and Chief Executive, Austin Reed Group plc.
- (Enid) Diana (Elizabeth) Rigg (Mrs. Stirling), Actress.
- Michael Silvanus Robinson, lately President, Shell International Trading Company.
- Professor Ian Campbell Roddie, TD, Chief Regional Scientific Adviser, Civil Defence, Northern Ireland.
- Major Charles Frederick Rose, MBE, Grade 4, Department of Transport.
- Derek Norman Rosling, Vice Chairman, Hanson plc.
- Michael Colin Shannon. For services to the Health and Safety Commission.
- Stephen Ashley Sherbourne. For political service.
- Robert Shearer Sim, MBE, QPM, H.M. Inspector of Constabulary for Scotland.
- Adrian Carnegie Slade. For political and public service.
- Clive Edward Snowden. For services to the Food Industry.
- John Oliver Spalding, Director and Chief Executive, Halifax Building Society.
- Patrick Christopher Steptoe, Medical Director, Bourn Hall Clinic, Cambridge.
- David Deas Stevenson, Group Managing Director, The Edinburgh Woollen Mill Ltd.
- Ronald George Taylor, Director General, The Association of British Chambers of Commerce.
- John Telford Beasley, Chairman and Managing Director, London Buses Ltd.
- David Jeffrey Thompson. For services to the development of synchrotron radiation.
- Professor Raymond Thompson, lately Business Development Director, Borax Holdings Ltd.
- Robert Burgess Thompson, lately Director Works Services, Department of Health and Social Services, Northern Ireland.
- Alistair MacLachlan Thomson, Director, Scottish Prison Service, Scottish Home and Health Department.
- John Warren Turner, Chairman and Managing Director, E. Turner & Sons Ltd.
- Professor Thomas Summers West, lately Site Director, Macaulay Land Use Research Institute.
- Alfred Arden Wood, TD. For services to conservation.
- Cecil Derek Woodburn-Bamberger. For political and public service.
- John George Woolhouse, Director of Educational Programmes, Manpower Services Commission.

Diplomatic Service and Overseas List

- Frank Addison, lately Judge of the High Court, Hong Kong.
- Graham Barnes, JP, Secretary, Government Secretariat, Hong Kong.
- Dr. John Charles Blackwell, British Council Representative, Indonesia.
- Christopher Herzig, lately Director (External Relations), IAEA, Vienna.
- Peter George Moate. For services to British commercial interests in Australia.
- Charles Wilfrid Newton, JP, chairman, Mass Transit Railway Corporation, Hong Kong.
- Philip Michael Piddington, lately Counsellor, Joint Administration Office, HM Embassy, Brussels.
- McWelling Todman, OBE, QC, chairman, Public Service Commission, British Virgin Islands.

==== Officer of the Order of the British Empire (OBE) ====
Military Division

Royal Navy

- Commander John Birkett, Royal Navy.
- Commander Michael John Butt, Royal Navy.
- Commander Peter John Cantelo, Royal Navy.
- Commander Francis Michael Emmett, Royal Navy.
- Major (Local Lieutenant Colonel) Graham Anthony Clifford Hoskins, MVO, Royal Marines.
- Commander Gordon Daniel Leary, Royal Navy.
- Commander William Lawrence Tosco Peppe, Royal Navy.
- Commander David Patrick Blackwood Ryan, Royal Navy.
- Lieutenant Commander Dennis Peter Selwood, MBE, Royal Navy.
- Commander (CCF) Frederick Edward Wakelin, Royal Naval Reserve.
- Commander Anthony Edward Wilkins, Royal Navy.

Army

- Lieutenant Colonel David de Gonville Bromhead, LVO, (479181), The Royal Regiment of Wales (24th/41st Foot).
- Lieutenant Colonel Terence Byrd (472503), Royal Army Ordnance Corps.
- Lieutenant Colonel Robert Arthur Crawley (483791), Royal Corps of Transport.
- Lieutenant Colonel Ian Geoffrey Campbell Durie (476500), Royal Regiment of Artillery.
- Lieutenant Colonel Jeremy John Gaskell (479230), The King's Regiment.
- Lieutenant Colonel Anthony Edmond Gaynor (480304), The Yorkshire Volunteers, Territorial Army.
- Lieutenant Colonel David Keith Harris, MBE, TD, (483629), The Royal Anglian Regiment, Territorial Army.
- Lieutenant Colonel Richard Holworthy (453486), The Light Infantry.
- Lieutenant Colonel Iain Alexander Johnstone (485762), The Royal Scots (The Royal Regiment).
- Lieutenant Colonel Stanley Mervyn Arnold Lee (481811), Royal Corps of Signals.
- Lieutenant Colonel Greville John Wyndham Malet (457063), The Royal Hussars (Prince of Wales's Own).
- Lieutenant Colonel Andrew Christopher Massey, MBE, (475200), Royal Corps of Transport.
- Lieutenant Colonel (Quartermaster) John Morgan (488726), Corps of Royal Engineers.
- Lieutenant Colonel Peter William Morling (481829), Royal Corps of Transport.
- Lieutenant Colonel George Anthony Neilson (478096), The Argyll and Sutherland Highlanders (Princess Louise's).
- Lieutenant Colonel Walter Hugh Malcolm Ross (476629), Scots Guards.
- Lieutenant Colonel Michael John Squire (476642), Royal Corps of Transport.
- Acting Colonel James Matheson Knight Weir, TD, DL, (443908), Army Cadet Force, Territorial Army.

Royal Air Force

- Wing Commander Frank Ernest Lawrence Hartnett (508022), Royal Air Force (Retired).
- Wing Commander Ernest Henry Lowe (207156), Royal Air Force Volunteer Reserve (Training).
- Wing Commander Hector Gavin Mackay, AFC, (2616088), Royal Air Force.
- Wing Commander Malcolm David Pledger, AFC, (508272), Royal Air Force.
- Wing Commander Thomas William Rimmer (2619749), Royal Air Force.
- Wing Commander Peter John Seymour (608395), Royal Air Force.
- Wing Commander William George Simpson, MBE, (689320), Royal Air Force.
- Wing Commander (now Group Captain) Peter Charles Symonds (682225), Royal Air Force.
- Wing Commander Andrew George Buchanan Vallance (608864), Royal Air Force.
- Wing Commander Barry Lewis Wood (3519293), Royal Air Force.
- Wing Commander Gerald James Woodley (608762), Royal Air Force.

Civil Division

- William Norman Adsetts, Chairman, Sheffield Insulating Company Ltd.
- Alice Margaret Janet Ainslie. For services to the Soldiers', Sailors' and Airmen's Families Association.
- Norman Douglas Anderson, Secretary, Scottish Crop Research Institute.
- Eric George Abbott Armstrong, Member, Central Arbitration Committee, Advisory Conciliation and Arbitration Service.
- Leslie Asquith, lately Chief Executive, Welwyn Hatfield District Council.
- Adam Noel Bailie. For services to agriculture in Northern Ireland.
- Malcolm Groves Barker, lately Editor, Yorkshire Evening Post.
- John Raymond Barringer, TD. For political and public service.
- Margaret Marie Bell, Headteacher, The Dales School, Northallerton, North Yorkshire.
- Frank Atkinson Benson, DL, lately Professor and Head of Department of Electronic and Electrical Engineering, University of Sheffield.
- Richard Stuart Best, Director, National Federation of Housing Associations.
- Dennis George Harley Billett, Principal Professional and Technology Officer, Ministry of Defence.
- Quentin Saxby Blake, Artist and Illustrator.
- Cyril Bleasdale, General Manager, London Midland Region, British Railways.
- Bernard Clifford Bowman, Honorary Sheriff, Dundee Sheriff Court.
- Damien Anthony Breen, Chairman, Police Complaints Board for Northern Ireland.
- Michael Bright, Chairman, Kearney & Trecker Marwin Ltd.
- Donald William Bromfield. For political and public service.
- Derrick Brown, lately Chairman, Ice Cream Federation.
- John Mackay Buckle, lately Principal Scientific Officer, Ministry of Defence.
- William Edward Buckley, lately Director, North Cheshire College.
- Jean Annette Bullwinkle, Deputy Drama Director, Arts Council.
- Edgar Stanley Bulmer, Manager, Lakeland Area, North Western Electricity Board.
- Peter John Bunker. For services to the community in Sussex.
- James Burnside, Managing Director, Welch Margetson.
- John Nicholas Butler, Principal, BIB Design Consultants.
- Basil Herbert Caesar-Gordon, DL, Chairman, London and South East Region Air Training Corps.
- Commander Donald Bruce Cairns, RD, lately Chief of Operations, Royal National Lifeboat Institution.
- Anne MacFarlane Calderwood, Principal Professional Adviser, National Board for Nursing, Midwifery and Health Visiting for Scotland.
- Thomas John Carter, Chairman, Barnet District Health Authority.
- Barrie George Ernest Cass, Foreign and Commonwealth Office.
- John Alan Chipchase, lately Assistant Chief Surveyor, Building, Metropolitan Police.
- John Brownlie Clark. For services to the Telecommunications Industry.
- Peter Clarke. For services to the National Council of Young Men's Christian Association.
- John Brian Cook, Central Engineering Manager, Exploration and Production, Shell UK.
- Alistair Basil Cooke. For political service.
- Jean Cooper (Mrs. Robinson), Principal, The National Hospitals College of Speech Sciences.
- Michael Norman Tizard Cottell, County Surveyor, Kent County Council.
- Thomas George Crane, Farmer and Company Director, Oxnead, Norwich.
- Edward George Culham, Director, Social Services, Nottinghamshire County Council.
- Robert Cummings, Deputy Chief Constable, North Yorkshire Police.
- Leslie Frank Curtis, BEM, Chairman, The Police Federation of England and Wales.
- Emily Eliza Dargue, District Nursing Officer, Sheffield Health Authority.
- Gavin Owen Davies. For services to the Magistracy.
- Cecil Leslie Dawkins, Finance Director, Management Services Ltd.
- John Archibald Donachy, Chairman, Scottish Film Council.
- Margaret Dunn. For services to Dance.
- Stanley William Egginton, Principal, Board of Customs and Excise.
- John Widdrington Elliott, Inspector SP, Board of Inland Revenue.
- John Walter Evans, Area Director, Western Area, British Coal Corporation.
- Eric Hampson Farnworth, Divisional Production Director and Assistant Managing Director, Air Weapons Division, Lostock, British Aerospace.
- Roy Paul Filling, Counselling Advisor, Small Firms Service.
- Robert Anthony Finch, Education Liaison Section Head, Imperial Chemical Industries.
- John Arthur Fitzgerald, Director, 'Bridge' Consultancy. For services to child care.
- Kevin Lindsay Fitzpatrick, Grade 7, Ministry of Defence.
- Gordon Lindsay Fordyce, Consultant Oral Surgeon, Mount Vernon Hospital.
- Peter Foxton. For services to Polar Sciences.
- Ralph John French, Director, East European Relations, Imperial Chemical Industries Europa. For services to Export.
- Hilary Doreen Gault, Chief Executive, Belfast Improved Houses Ltd.
- Andrew Gerrard, Master Boat Builder, Arbroath.
- John Philip Gillbanks, Divisional Director and General Manager, British Aerospace plc.
- Derek Channon Gladwell, Head, Department of Food and Hospitality Studies, Sheffield City Polytechnic.
- Commander Nisbet Cunningham Glen, Royal Navy (Retd.), lately Naval Assistant, Ministry of Defence.
- Leslie Henry Wynne Golding. For services to Athletics.
- George Grassie, Director of Development, East Kilbride Development Corporation.
- John Frederick Webb Green, TD, Member, West Wales Regional Committee, Territorial Auxiliary and Volunteer Reserve Association.
- Alan Ray Hacker, Conductor and Clarinetist.
- Thomas Hamer, lately Grade 7, Manpower Services Commission.
- Michael Hamilton, lately Consultant Physician, Mid Essex District Health Authority. For services to Medicine.
- Miles Clayton Hardie, lately Director General, International Hospital Federation.
- Sydney Herbert Harrison. For services to the Gazette Group Newspapers.
- David Michael Hart, General Secretary, National Association of Head Teachers.
- Vincent Hart, chairman, North Yorkshire Area Manpower Board; Manpower Services Commission.
- Patricia Hayes (Mrs. Brooke), Actress.
- Anthony John Heath, Head, UK Aircraft and General Aviation Sections, Civil Aviation Authority.
- Robert Heatley, Chairman and Managing Director, G. A. Group.
- Thomas Heaton, Primary Adviser, Rochdale Local Education Authority.
- Douglas Thorley Hemmings, Chief Executive, Cumnock and Doon Valley District Council.
- Kenneth Henry Alexander Henderson, Senior Principal Courts Administrator, Winchester.
- David Thomas Heslop, Director of Sales, British Gas plc.
- John Alfred Blyth Hibbs, Director of Transport Studies, City of Birmingham Polytechnic.
- William Wilson Hill, Dockyard Personnel Manager, Babcock-Thorn Ltd, Rosyth.
- Gilbert Clive Hinckley, Group Managing Director, The Hinckley Group of Companies.
- Margaret Joy Howell-Jones. For political and public service.
- Peter John Hubbard, Principal Scientific Officer, Ministry of Defence.
- Brian Eric Humphrey. For services to the horticultural industry.
- Christian Gibson Hunter, lately Secretary to the Delegates of Local Examinations, University of Oxford.
- Kathleen Marjorie Jacobs. For political and public service.
- James Turnbull Jardine, Head of Physics Department, Moray House College of Education.
- Cyril Raymond Jeffs, lately General Manager, Aviation & General Insurance Company Ltd.
- Richard Frederick Jolley, MC, lately Director, British Beef Company Ltd.
- William John Jones, MBE, Chairman, Mid and Glamorgan Area Manpower Board.
- Robert Anthony Keable-Elliott, General Medical Practitioner, Buckinghamshire.
- Thomas Augustine Kelly, Principal Education Psychologist, Sandwell.
- Sister Oliver Kinane. For services to the education and care of disabled children.
- Kenneth Alexander Lane. For political service.
- David Langdon, Cartoonist and Illustrator.
- Joan Mary Last. For services to Music Education.
- Alan Lee, Chief Nursing Officer, Park Lane Special Hospital, Department of Health and Social Security.
- Thomas Orr Leith, Contracts Director, Weir Pumps Ltd. For services to Export.
- Sheila Florence Lesley. For services in the field of Patents and Trade Marks.
- Frank Stanley Lester. For public service in Bedfordshire.
- Donald Gordon Lewis. For political and public service.
- Hugh Little, Member, Cumbria County Council.
- Derek John Llewellyn, General Practitioner, Bridgend, Mid Glamorgan.
- Peter Lloyd-Owen. For services to The Girl Guides Association.
- John Michael Lomax, Director, Safety and Health Division, The Building Employers' Confederation.
- John Duncan Ott Loudon, lately Consultant Obstetrician and Gynaecologist, Eastern General Hospital, Edinburgh.
- Ian MacArthur, Director, British Textile Confederation.
- Edward Gerard Mackle, Director, Newry Credit Union.
- Donald MacPhail, Principal, Moray College of Further Education.
- Patrick Arthur Magennis, Member, Federation of Building and Civil Engineering Contractors, Northern Ireland.
- John Makepeace. For services to furniture design.
- William Alison Martin, Governor I, HM Prison, Leeds.
- John Walter Matthew. For political and public service.
- Alan Gilbert McBride, Secretary, Seamen's Hospital Society.
- Graeme Patrick Daniel McDonald, Controller, BBC 2 Television.
- Cameron McLatchie, Group Managing Director, Scott & Robertson plc, Greenock.
- James Paton McPherson. For public service, particularly in Tayside.
- Herbert James McVeigh, Grade 7, Department of the Environment.
- Thomas Gurney Mercer, DL. For services to the community in Hertfordshire.
- John Terence Middleton. For political and public service.
- Alan Michael Millwood, Director, John Laing plc.
- Ivor Graham Mitchell. For services to Sport for the Disabled.
- William Henry Moffatt, Director, Hospital Advisory Service, Northern Ireland.
- Jill Mary Moore, Member, National Consumer Council.
- Leonard Mostyn. For services to Friendly Societies.
- Stephen Basil William Mouat, Director and Manufacturing Manager, Uniroyal Englebert Tyres Ltd.
- Margaret Hilary Mullineux, Chief Nursing Officer, Scunthorpe Health Authority.
- Paul Geoffrey Murdin, Head, Astronomy and Research Division, Royal Greenwich Observatory, Science and Engineering Research Council.
- Sheelagh Mary Murnaghan, lately Chairman, Industrial Tribunals, Northern Ireland.
- Alan Walter Nelson, Member of the council, Chartered Association of Certified Accountants.
- Paul Newell, QPM, Deputy Chief Constable, Dumfries and Galloway Constabulary.
- George Oakley Nixon, Senior Principal, Ministry of Defence.
- Alan William Northen, Leader, Wellingborough Borough Council.
- Sister Anne Therese O'Shea, Regional Co-ordinator, Secondary Schools Development Programme, Northern Ireland.
- Professor Patrick Edmund O'Sullivan, Institute of Science and Technology Chair of Agricultural Science, University of Wales. For services to Energy Conservation.
- Shirley Ann Oxenbury, MBE. For political service.
- Margaret Sutcliffe Palmer. For political service.
- Geoffrey Keith Charles Pardoe, Chairman and Managing Director, General Technology Systems Ltd.
- Richard Harry Passmore. For political and public service.
- Margaret Ruth Olivia Patey. For voluntary services particularly to Dr. Barnardo's.
- Franklyn Hugh Perring, lately General Secretary, Royal Society for Nature Conservation.
- Anthony Guy Phillips, Secretary, Association of Professional Foresters.
- Irwyn Phillips. For public service in Wales.
- Stuart Phillips, President, Freight Transport Association.
- Robert Heywood Phillipson, Director General, British Aggregate Construction Materials Industries.
- Douglas Edwin Pickford, Headteacher, Great Cornard Upper School, Sudbury, Suffolk.
- Frederick Arthur Charles Pinney, Leader, East Devon District Council.
- James Louis Patrick Pope, Official Receiver (A), The Insolvency Service.
- Raymond Alfred James Porter. For services to the community in Surrey.
- Judith Anne Pratt. For political and public service.
- Arthur Preece. For political and public service.
- Frank Samuel Preston, VRD, lately Director of Medical Services, British Airways plc.
- Donald William Proctor, Grade 7, Ordnance Survey.
- Dennis Pugh, Grade 7, Welsh Office.
- Richard Howard Pullan, lately County Surveyor and Engineer, Gwent County Council.
- Evelyn May Raymond, National Chairman, Women's Section, The Royal British Legion.
- George Reynolds. For services to Youth in London.
- Kenneth Frederick Richardson. For political and public service.
- Peter McKellar Robertson, lately Deputy Chairman, Commission for Local Authority Accounts in Scotland.
- Anita Lucia Roddick, Managing Director, The Body Shop International plc.
- William Thomas Rooney, Chairman, The Spring Ram Corporation plc.
- John Rowlands, lately Head Teacher, Holyhead Comprehensive School, Gwynedd.
- John Bell Russell, Inspector SP, Board of Inland Revenue.
- Marina Agostina Corinna Seabright, Head of Wessex Regional Cytogenetics Unit.
- Michael Lewis Shattock, Registrar, University of Warwick.
- Terence Joseph Shiels, TD, lately Vice-Chairman, Police Authority for Northern Ireland.
- William Harry Simpson, Chief Architect, Welsh Health Common Services Agency.
- Basil Chisholm Skinner, Director, Extra Mural Studies, University of Edinburgh.
- Pamela Veronica Smith. For political and public service.
- Arthur Kirk Stock, Director, National Institute of Adult Continuing Education, England and Wales.
- Alexander Stone. For charitable services to the community, particularly the West of Scotland.
- James McFall Strain, Chief Education and Training Officer, Northern Ireland Office.
- George Highley Sugden, MC. For services to the National Trust.
- Timothy Gerard Sullivan. For services to the Magistracy.
- Alan Turner. For services to the food industry.
- Anthony Richard Tutton, TD. For services to agriculture in Wales.
- Leslie William Vincent. For services to Scouting in Berkshire.
- Doreen Mary Wagner, Chief Nursing Officer, North Bedfordshire Health Authority.
- Peter Watson, Chief Executive, Guest, Keen & Nettlefolds Technology Ltd.
- Arthur Alfred William Weston, BEM, Secretary, Civil Aviation Centre, St John Ambulance Association, London Airport.
- Desmond James Williams, Senior Partner, Ellis & Williams Partnership.
- Peter Henry Wilson, Chief Fire Officer, Nottinghamshire Fire Brigade.
- John Wadham Winckworth. For public service in Alderney.
- Vincent Antony Woods, lately Deputy Principal Clerk, Supreme Courts, Scottish Courts Administration.
- Priscilla Jean Wotherspoon, Chairman, Probation Committee, Merseyside.

Diplomatic Service and Overseas List

- Richard Harding Alford, British Council Representative, Poland.
- Margaret Patricia Barclay, lately Translator, Secretariat General, EC Commission, Brussels.
- William Norman Bodden, MBE. For public services in the Cayman Islands.
- Chan Sui Kau, JP. For public services in Hong Kong.
- Leonard Chiu Kung-phoo, JP. For public and community services in Hong Kong.
- Raymond Chow Ting-hsing. For services to the film industry in Hong Kong.
- Rodney Bray Croker. For services to British commercial interests in Greece.
- Dr. Esther Mary Davis. For medical and welfare services to the community in Nigeria.
- William Keith Dobson, lately British Council Representative, Hungary.
- Nadine Georgette Makrouhi Ekserdjian, MBE, Honorary British Consul, Cagliari.
- John Llewelyn Dixon Evans. For services to British commercial interests in Singapore.
- Rita Fan Hsu Lai-tai, JP. For public services in Hong Kong.
- John Hartley Greenfield, First Secretary (Commercial), British High Commission, Port of Spain.
- Robert Arthur Groom. For services to the British community in Boston.
- Robin Ian Menelaus Hardy. For services to British commercial interests in Panama.
- James Stanley Hawken. For services to British commercial interests in the Federal Republic of Germany.
- Anthony John Hawkes, lately First Secretary, HM Embassy, Islamabad.
- Kenneth Kwok Wai Kai, JP, Director, Territory Development, Hong Kong.
- Anthony Mango, lately Executive Secretary, Joint Staff Pensions Board, UN, New York.
- Ivanhoe Nigel Stuart Lathom-Sharp. For services to the British community in Paris.
- Anthony Wyndham Mead. For services to British aviation interests in Italy.
- Joseph Charles Morello, QPM, CPM, Commissioner of Police, Gibraltar.
- Nigel Pendleton Parkinson. For services to British commercial interests in Mexico.
- Derrick Weastall Paterson. For services to British commercial interests in Dubai.
- William Alfred Thomas Pulleyblank, MBE, British Vice-Consul, Tangier.
- George William Reid, lately British Council Representative, Sierra Leone.
- Michael John Senter. For services to British commercial interests in Czechoslovakia.
- John Alexander Shuttleworth, Accountant-General, Vanuatu.
- Clive St. George Stanbrook. For services to British commercial interests in Belgium.
- John Arthur Taylor, Commonwealth Development Corporation Representative, Eastern Caribbean.
- Alan Tremain. For services to British commercial interests in Boston.
- Reginald Dennis Williams, lately First Secretary (Commercial), British High Commission, Lusaka.
- Brian Woodhead, MBE, General Manager, Commonwealth Development Corporation Plantations, Solomon Islands.
- Yeung Po-Kwan, CPM, JP, For public services in Hong Kong.

==== Member of the Order of the British Empire (MBE) ====
Military Division

Royal Navy

- Lieutenant Commander Samuel Patterson Edgar, Royal Navy.
- Lieutenant Commander Thomas Edwards, Royal Navy.
- Lieutenant Richard Ernest Euridge, Royal Marines.
- Warrant Officer (Diver) Michael George Fellows, DSC, BEM.
- Lieutenant Commander (SCC) John Stewart Flynn, Royal Naval Reserve.
- Lieutenant Commander (SCC) Stanley John Haworth, Royal Naval Reserve.
- Lieutenant Commander John Anthony Holt, Royal Navy.
- Warrant Officer 1 Andrew Ray Disney Jackson, Royal Marines.
- Lieutenant Commander Nigel Peter Richard Maddox, Royal Navy.
- Lieutenant Commander Thomas McAndrew, Royal Navy.
- Lieutenant Commander Christopher Paul Robinson, Royal Navy.
- Warrant Officer (Steward) Albert Brazier Saywell.
- Lieutenant (NCS) Julian Adrian Stockwin, Royal Naval Reserve.

Army

- 24082842 Warrant Officer Class 2 Malcolm Scott Barnish, Royal Regiment of Artillery.
- Major Terence John Bock (481726), The Cheshire Regiment.
- Acting Major Ronald Boylen (473853), Army Cadet Force, Territorial Army.
- 24326006 Warrant Officer Class 2 Wayne Stewart Brown, Royal Corps of Signals.
- Major John Edward Rivers Bulkeley (476854), The Queen's Own Hussars.
- 23890927 Warrant Officer Class 2 Anthony Charles Canessa, Corps of Royal Engineers.
- 22779369 Warrant Officer Class 1 Dennis Patrick Cleary, Irish Guards.
- Major Graham Kinnear Cowie (474445), 52nd Lowland Volunteers, Territorial Army.
- 23940981 Warrant Officer Class 2 John Michael Joseph Devine, Corps of Royal Engineers.
- Major Terence Oliver Dowey (485197), The Royal Irish Rangers (27th (Inniskilling) 83rd and 87th).
- 24035642 Warrant Officer Class 2 David Edwin Duffy, The Royal Hampshire Regiment.
- Major Charles Joseph Edwards (488099), The Queen's Own Mercian Yeomanry, Territorial Army.
- 24183378 Warrant Officer Class 2 Mervyn Finch, Royal Corps of Signals.
- Captain (Quartermaster) Ronald Stanley Goodwin (516689), The Cheshire Regiment.
- Major (Staff Quartermaster) Reginald Evan Granger (497770), Royal Army Ordnance Corps.
- Captain Roger Ernest Green (509838), Royal Army Medical Corps.
- 22138788 Warrant Officer Class 2 Iain Gerald Hounslow, Royal Army Pay Corps, Territorial Army.
- Major (Staff Quartermaster) John Archibald James Humphreys (497795), Royal Army Ordnance Corps.
- 24115818 Warrant Officer Class 2 Eric Jones, Royal Corps of Transport.
- 24332757 Warrant Officer Class 2 Steven Aleksa Krstic, Royal Regiment of Artillery.
- 22931687 Warrant Officer Class 2 Sidney John Lang, Royal Corps of Signals, Territorial Army.
- Major (Quartermaster) John McMullen Lauder (496560), The Argyll and Sutherland Highlanders (Princess Louise's).
- Captain Frank Michael Lindop (519987), Corps of Royal Military Police.
- Major Guy Spencer Lucas (479439), Corps of Royal Engineers.
- 24120516 Warrant Officer Class 2 Edward Walter Miles, BEM, Corps of Royal Engineers.
- Major Hugh Brisbane Henry Ewart Monro (493053), Queen's Own Highlanders (Seaforth and Camerons).
- Major Malcolm Beresford Montgomery (474013), The Queen's Regiment.
- Captain Michael Munn (498228), The Parachute Regiment.
- Acting Major Valentine Anthony Narracott (474496), Combined Cadet Force, Territorial Army.
- Captain Mark Richard Neville (509189), Corps of Royal Engineers.
- Captain (Traffic Officer) Sylvia Pratt (512231), Women's Royal Army Corps.
- 24179012 Warrant Officer Class 1 Derek Arthur Preece, Corps of Royal Engineers.
- Major Michael Jeremy Richards (488479), Royal Corps of Transport.
- Major Michael Stephen Robjohn (472613), The Royal Irish Rangers (27th (Inniskilling) 83rd and 87th).
- Captain (Garrison Engineer (Construction)) Robert Senior (520421), Corps of Royal Engineers.
- 23938106 Warrant Officer Class 1 Robert Arthur Skinner, Corps of Royal Electrical and Mechanical Engineers.
- Major (Quartermaster) Michael Jeffrey Smee (507643), Corps of Royal Engineers.
- Major James Ronald Smiles, TD, (440838), Royal Army Pay Corps, Territorial Army.
- Captain Michael James Stephens (515839), Royal Army Medical Corps.
- Major Piers Atherley David Storie-Pugh, TD (492831), The Queen's Regiment, Territorial Army.
- Major Frederick Richard Viggers (492992), Royal Regiment of Artillery.
- Major (Garrison Engineer (Construction)) Clifford George Leonard Whennell (497860), Corps of Royal Engineers.
- Major (Quartermaster) Glyn White (504566), Welsh Guards.
- Major Albert Edward Whitley (495259), Corps of Royal Engineers.
- Major Michael Norman Woodford (487438), Royal Army Ordnance Corps, Territorial Army.

Royal Air Force

- Flight Lieutenant (now Squadron Leader) Walter Armstrong (4274731), Royal Air Force.
- Flight Lieutenant Jonathan Paul Baggott (5203132), Royal Air Force.
- Warrant Officer Anthony Bulman (F4074597), Royal Air Force.
- Flight Lieutenant David Edward Carter (687081), Royal Air Force.
- Warrant Officer Alan Combes (H1939968), Royal Air Force.
- Squadron Leader Kenneth Ellis Dunlop (8022903), Royal Air Force.
- Squadron Leader Anthony Robert Garland (685748), Royal Air Force.
- Warrant Officer Dennis Francis Christopher Griggs (P1949227), Royal Air Force.
- Warrant Officer Colin John Hawkins (S4087217), Royal Air Force.
- Master Engineer Adrian John Knight (C4148398), Royal Air Force.
- Flight Lieutenant (now Squadron Leader) Francis Lovejoy (1939621), Royal Air Force.
- Squadron Leader George Annal Mackay (3525300), Royal Air Force.
- Flight Lieutenant Arthur Stanley Michael (207414), Royal Air Force Volunteer Reserve (Training).
- Flight Lieutenant (now Squadron Leader) Anthony Raymond Mills (1931874), Royal Air Force.
- Master Engineer John Richard Murrell (B0688326), Royal Air Force.
- Warrant Officer Keith Albert Proctor (N0593487), Royal Air Force.
- Squadron Leader Ronald George Rhodes, AFC, (3504347), Royal Air Force.
- Warrant Officer Brian John Robins (M0685173), Royal Air Force.
- Squadron Leader Ernest Harold Scase (4190600), Royal Air Force.
- Warrant Officer Hamish Christopher Thompson, BEM, (X1931935), Royal Air Force.
- Squadron Leader (now Wing Commander) David Todd (5202569), Royal Air Force.
- Squadron Leader Roger William White (4335650), Royal Air Force Regiment.
- Flying Officer Brian Whitton (1950308), Royal Air Force.
- Squadron Leader Andrew Orr Wright (609112), Royal Air Force.

Overseas Award

- Squadron Leader Royston Webb Brooks, Royal Hong Kong Auxiliary Air Force.

Civil Division

- Edith Abel. For services to the community in Northern Ireland.
- Sudarshan Kaur Abrol, Headteacher, Mayfield Special School, Handsworth, Birmingham.
- John Peter Airey, Navigation Manager and Chief Inspector, Thames Water Authority.
- Joyce Irene Akam, lately Higher Executive Officer, Metropolitan Police.
- Dennis Leslie Amiss. For services to Cricket.
- Dennis Craig Amor, Artillery Products Group Manager, Ordnance Systems Division, Frimley, Marconi Command & Control Systems Ltd.
- George John Ansell, Probation Officer. For services to Thanet Victim Support Scheme.
- Major Richard John Armstrong (Retd.), lately Retired Officer III, Ministry of Defence.
- Lieutenant Commander Brian Gerald Ashmore, RD, (Royal Naval Reserve, Retd.), Director and Secretary, Westfield Housing Association Ltd.
- Alan Roy Ashton, Chief Mechanical Engineer, Devon County Council.
- John Atkinson, National Coach, British Amateur Gymnastics Association.
- Burjor Jal Avari, Section Leader, Multi-Cultural Education, Tameside.
- Diane Jane Bailey. For services to Golf.
- Wendy Diane Bailey. For political service.
- Herbert Charles Richard Ballam, chairman, Beacon Hill Group of Companies.
- Joan Barker, County Staff Officer, Grade II Nursing Cadets, Humberside Branch, St John Ambulance Brigade.
- Betsy Kate Barsby. For services to the community in Peterborough.
- Brian Michael Batty, Divisional Officer II, Hereford and Worcester Fire Brigade.
- Trevor Bawn, Operations Manager, IMI Bailey Birkett Ltd.
- Brian Bazley, Higher Executive Officer, Advisory, Conciliation and Arbitration Service.
- Eric George Beaman, VRD, Deputy Principal, Department of Economic Development, Northern Ireland.
- Maurice John Bean, Vice-chairman, British Fire Protection Systems Association Ltd.
- Norman Henry Beaver, Ambulance Station Officer, Cornwall.
- Alan Magrath Beckett. For services to the Agricultural Industry.
- Margaret Belcher, lately Higher Executive Officer, Department of Health and Social Security.
- Corinne Gillian Bennett, Partner, Purcell, Miller & Tritton.
- Robert Michael Berrington, Principal in General Practice, Huntingdon.
- James Sutherland Bertram, lately Governor (Class III), HM Young Offenders' Institution, Castle Huntly, Scottish Home and Health Department.
- Cynthia Margaret Bingham, Headmistress, Oaklands Infants', School, Wilmslow, Cheshire.
- Vivian Peter Birch, CPM, lately Security Officer (Physical) I, Ministry of Defence.
- Marie Josephine Bird. For political and public service.
- Graham Austin Black, Higher Executive Officer, Department of Health and Social Security.
- Joseph Derek Black. For services to the community in Hampshire.
- Frederick Joseph Bloor. For services to the community in the Medway Towns.
- Una Grace Blues. For services to the Dorset Branch, National Association of Retired Police Officers.
- Leslie Bolton, lately Higher Executive Officer, Office of Population Censuses and Surveys.
- William Arthur Bonds. For services to Association Football.
- Muriel Ann Elizabeth Bowdich, Senior Personal Secretary, Welsh Office.
- Henry William Yool Bowie, Head of Machinery Department, Cumbria College of Agriculture and Forestry, Newton Rigg.
- Margaret Joyce Bowman, Controller, St. John Ambulance Air Wing.
- Roger Joseph Bradshaw, Founder, Eastern Ravens Trust. For services to children and young people at risk, Cleveland.
- Arthur Thomas Brain, Secretary, National Association of Cider Makers.
- Philip John Brind. For services to agricultural marketing.
- Henry John Bristow, Collector (Higher Grade), Board of Inland Revenue.
- Margaret Dorothy Brock, vice-president, Sense, the National Deaf-Blind and Rubella Association.
- Greta (Margaret Somerville) Brooks, lately chairman, Community Police Consultative Group, Lambeth.
- Norah Jane Browning, lately Deputy Headmistress, Nutfield Priory Boarding School for the Deaf, Redhill, Surrey.
- Marion Buchanan, TD, Nursing Services Manager, United Services Unit, Lothian Health Board.
- Kenneth John Burge, lately Editor in Chief, South West Counties Newspapers.
- William Burnett, Director, Brighton Resorts Services Department, Brighton Borough Council.
- Robert Charles Butcher, Joint Managing Director, Bluemay Ltd.
- Jean Marion Butler, Headteacher, Lawefield First School, Wakefield.
- Dinah Rosemary Cadogan. For services to Sport for the Disabled.
- Alan Caiger-Smith, Potter.
- John Caine, Founder and Leader, Salford Playhouse.
- Mabel Isobel Cameron. For services to the community in Motherwell.
- James Campbell, Director, Careers Service, Hampshire.
- Patricia Dorothy Jill Campbell, Head of Personnel Services, British Museum.
- Robert White Campbell, Director, Scottish Building Employers' Federation.
- John Wallis Carter, Systems Department Manager, Marconi Space Systems Ltd.
- Sheila Reid Chaplin. For political service.
- Charles Henry Chapman, Treasurer, Devon Youth Association.
- Anne Gartner Cheetham. For political and public service.
- Eric William Clayton. For services to the Construction Industry Training Board.
- Kenneth Sidney Cobley, Inspector, Board of Inland Revenue.
- Raymond William Ogilvie Collins, Production Manager, Portex Ltd., Hythe, Kent.
- Thomas Connah, Chief Commandant, Durham Special Constabulary.
- Audrey Conway, lately Senior Executive Officer, Manpower Services Commission.
- Herbert Douglas Haig Cooper, DFC, Member, Board of Visitors, HM Prison, Magilligan, County Londonderry.
- Victor George Cowland, Senior Professional and Technology Officer, Ministry of Defence.
- Susan Margaret Cox. For political and public service.
- Cynthia Margaret Crawford. For political service.
- Dorothy Gwendoline Crossley, lately Radiographer, Grendon Underwood Security Prison, Buckinghamshire.
- Leslie Crowther, lately Business Opportunities Manager, North West Water Authority.
- Leonard Mathew Cruikshank, Project Manager, Diggers Community Programme and Landscaping Scheme.
- Lieutenant Colonel Ernest Melville Terence Crump, Superintendent, Corps of Queen's Messengers and Head of Messenger Services.
- Joan Mary Cullen. For political and public service.
- Barry Oakley Dabell, Head of Mechanical Support, Rolls-Royce & Associates Ltd.
- Ian Dale, Higher Executive Officer, Board of Customs and Excise.
- Desmond John Dartmouth. For political service.
- Jean Mary Davies, Higher Executive Officer, Board of Inland Revenue.
- Frank Cecil Davis, Contributor on the decorative arts to Country Life Magazine.
- Roger Brent Davis, Chief Superintendent, Northamptonshire Police.
- Thomas Michael Davis, executive director, Rubber Trade Association of London.
- Joyce Lilian Daysh, Typing Manager, Department of Health and Social Security.
- Henry William Allan Deacon, Chief Test Pilot, Short Brothers plc.
- Colin Thomas Deans. For services to Scottish Rugby Football.
- Edith Florence Devlin, Lecturer, Queen's University, Belfast. For services to Adult Education.
- James Frederick Dixon, lately Executive Officer, Ministry of Defence.
- Arthur Donaldson, Chief Inspector, Strathclyde Police.
- Alfred Arthur Doorne, lately Assistant Collector, Board of Inland Revenue.
- Terence Downing. For services to the Barrow Lifeboat Station Branch, Royal National Lifeboat Institution.
- Vivian George Ian Dunington, Member, Luton Borough Council.
- Peggy Elizabeth Durrant, Administrative Officer, Lord Chancellor's Department.
- Peggy Vivien Edwards. For political and public service.
- Elizabeth Owen Evans. For political and public service.
- Janet Elizabeth Evans, Headmistress, Abbey Primary School, Leicester City.
- Nicholas Alexander Faldo. For services to Golf.
- John Feenan, Technical Director Fusegear Division, GEC Installation Equipment Ltd.
- Henry Forrest Ferguson, lately Senior Executive Officer, HM Youth Custody Centre, Hollesley Bay.
- Robert George Fewell, Principal Medical Laboratory, Scientific Officer, London Hospital, Whitechapel.
- John Fidler, Senior Scientific Officer, Ministry of Defence.
- Charles James Fisk. For services to the Construction Industry.
- Julia Fitzpatrick, lately Sister, Acute Medical Ward, Rotherham Health Authority.
- Gloria Fleming, Organiser, East Kilbride Citizens' Advice Bureau.
- Jean Doreen Mary Forbes, Vice-chairman, Women's Royal Voluntary Service, Wales.
- Gordon Horace Foster, Partner, Gordon H. Foster.
- George Alexander Fraser, Superintendent, Central Scotland Police.
- Brian Leslie Freedman, chairman and Joint Managing Director, Carfax Gowns Ltd.
- Edith Freeman, Secretary, Plymouth Society for Mentally Handicapped Children.
- Elizabeth Mclntosh Fulton, President, Edinburgh Branch, British Red Cross Society.
- Harry Ward Gardner, Conductor, The Linn Choir. For services to Charity.
- Cyril Gibbens, Chief Superintendent, Metropolitan Police.
- John Anderson Gibson, Senior Scientific Officer, Engineering Sciences Division, Harwell, UK Atomic Energy Authority.
- Robert Wallace Glass, chairman, Scottish Council, British Dental Association.
- Rufus John Godson, Chief Economist, Headquarters, British Gas plc.
- William Law Goldie, chairman and managing director, Lamberton & Company Ltd, Coatbridge.
- Helen Kennoway Gonella, Supervisor, Text Processing Centre, South of Scotland Electricity Board.
- Ronald Gooch. For services to the agricultural organic fertiliser industry.
- Denise Patricia Grannum. For political service.
- David Gray, Director of Music and Conductor, Brighton Youth Orchestra.
- Celia Greenhalgh, Inspector of Taxes, Board of Inland Revenue.
- (William) Kenneth Grigg, DFM. For services to the fishing industry.
- David Arthur Gurnham, General Dental Practitioner. Chairman, Solihull Family Practitioner Committee.
- Pamela Mary Hardy. For political and public service.
- Sheila Harper, Headteacher, Finzean Primary School, Aboyne, Aberdeenshire.
- Jenkin Alun Harries, Higher Executive Officer, Manpower Services Commission.
- Donald Norman Harrington, Principal Transcriber, House of Commons.
- Eustelle Patrick Harvey, Deputy President, Western Branch, The British Red Cross Society, Northern Ireland.
- Stuart Harvey, Senior Professional and Technology Officer, Department of the Environment.
- Dorothy Mollie Harwood, Senior Nursing Officer, Occupational Health Unit, Royal Victoria Hospital, Bournemouth.
- Norman Joseph Hazell. For political and public service.
- Patrick William Francis Hazell, Local Officer I, Department of Health and Social Security.
- Kenneth Headon, chairman, Sale, Altrincham and District Spastics Society.
- Eileen Mary Helliwell, Headteacher, Chantlers County Primary School, Bury, Lancashire.
- Mary Henry, lately Senior Night Sister Westmorland County Hospital.
- James Hewitson, lately Area Industrial Relations Officer, Nottinghamshire Area, British Coal Corporation.
- Alan John Higbee, chairman, Institute of Rent Officers.
- Dorothy Ann Hirons, Matron, Director of Nursing Services, General and Dental Hospitals, Birmingham.
- Doreen Halstead Hitchcock, Secretary, Burnley and District Incorporated Chamber of Commerce and Industry.
- Dr. Alfred Lewis Hodgson, Senior Partner in General Practice, Finsbury Park, London.
- Andrew Jeremy Holmes. For services to Rowing.
- George Rowland Howe, Chief Clerk, Registrar's Office, University of Newcastle upon Tyne.
- Eric William Hughes, Chief Superintendent, Surrey Constabulary.
- John William Hume, Master, J. & A. Gardner & Company Ltd.
- Frederick William Huntley, Administrator, Corporate Secretariat, British Airways plc.
- Eric Greenwood Jenner. For services to the community in Brechin.
- Colin Gilbert Jennings, Senior Executive Officer, Department of Employment.
- Richard Edmund Johnston, lately Chief Education Welfare Officer, South Eastern Education and Library Board.
- David Arthur Jones, General Adviser, Craft, Design and Technology, Bradford Local Education Authority.
- John Emrys Oriel Jones. For services to agriculture.
- Thomas Henry Jones. For services to the fishing industry.
- William Victor Jones. For services to the Camping and Caravanning Club.
- Norman Kates, Higher Professional and Technology Officer, Commonwealth War Graves Commission.
- Margaret Ferguson Kellam. For services to mentally disabled people in Northampton.
- Marion Miller Kennedy, Typing Manager, Ministry of Agriculture, Fisheries and Food.
- Ronald George Killick, lately Senior Safety Co-ordinator, Conoco United Kingdom Ltd.
- Martha McCullough Kirker, chairman, Helping Hands Club, Muckamore Abbey Hospital, County Antrim.
- Deryck Francis Knight, lately Detective Superintendent, West Mercia Constabulary.
- Maria Knight, Matron, Mid-Downs Health Authority.
- James Stuart Lacy, Local Officer I, Department of Health and Social Security.
- Audrey Doris Ladd, Executive Officer, Department of the Environment.
- Valerie Doreen Langweil, Private Secretary, Medical Research Council.
- Mary Large, Farmer, North Hykeham, Lincoln.
- Diana Joan Lavender, lately Computer Aided Design and Manufacture Controller, Air Weapons Division, Hatfield, British Aerospace plc.
- Alan Albert Leach, Technical Secretary, The Brewers Society.
- Sylvia Mary Leach, lately Headteacher, Harewood Lane First School, North Elmsall, West Yorkshire.
- Ernest Alexander Leslie, lately Senior Nurse, Ladysbridge Hospital, Banff.
- Harry Stanley Lewis, lately Senior Professional and Technology Officer, Ministry of Defence.
- Anne Jackson Liddle, Headteacher, Pentland Primary School, Bilh'ngham, Cleveland.
- Catherine MacNaughton MacCuish. For political and public service.
- Elizabeth MacDonald. For services to crofting.
- Thomas MacIver. For political service.
- Lachlan Hugh Maclachlan, lately Senior Executive Officer, Board of Customs and Excise.
- Alistair Ian MacLeod, chairman, Dumfries and Galloway Committee for the Employment of Disabled Persons.
- Humphrey Winthrop Macworth-Praed, chairman, Conservation Committee, Surrey Wildlife Trust.
- Peggy Makeman, State Enrolled Nurse, Nottingham Area Health Authority.
- Gordon Malpass, Training Adviser, Product Engineering, Austin Rover Group Ltd.
- Sylvia Marder, Deputy Principal Solicitor, London Residuary Body.
- Thomas Edward Marriott. For services to the Royal British Legion, Northern Ireland.
- Dennis John Mason, Editor, Stroud News and Journal.
- Clifford John Maxwell. For services to Energy Conservation.
- Max Heinz Mayer, Group Production Manager, Gomshall & Associated Tanneries Ltd.
- Archibald McAlpine, Vice-chairman, Scottish Vocational Education Council.
- William McCallum, Chief Ambulance Officer, West Glamorgan Health Authority.
- Patrick John McCoy, Creamery Convenor, Amalgamated Transport and General Workers' Union.
- Bernard Garnett McCusker, General Manager, Operations, Port of Liverpool.
- James Oliver McDonald, Treasurer, Jubilee Trust and Prince's Trust, Northern Ireland.
- Jean McGuire, Secretary, Maryhill Housing Association, Glasgow.
- James Jackson McLachlan, Head of Exchange Maintenance Division, Northern Ireland District British Telecommunications plc.
- Jillian McWilliam (Mrs. Lee), Director, Bejam Freezer Food Centres Ltd.
- Edward Mellor, Trade Secretary, British and South Asian Trade Association, The British Overseas Trade Board, Area Advisory Group. For services to Export.
- Wendy May Mercier, lately Headteacher, Hillcrest Special School, Dunstable, Bedfordshire.
- Ronald Edward George Meyer, BEM. For services to the Scout Association.
- William Alexander Middleton, Manager, Pluscarden Farms, Elgin.
- Alistair Robert Milne, Technical Manager, Weapon Systems, Defence Systems Division, Vickers plc.
- Josephine Ann Morgan, lately Senior Midwifery Tutor, Lewisham and North Southwark.
- Alice Joyce, Morris, Higher Executive Officer, Department of Health and Social Security.
- Mary Murray. For services to the Scottish Fisheries Museum, Anstruther.
- Alan David Nicol, Clerk, Castlereagh Borough Council, Northern Ireland.
- William Ernest Nowill. For services to the community in Sheffield.
- Judith Miriam Oakes. For services to Athletics.
- Hugh Patrick O'Donnell, Inspector, Royal Ulster Constabulary.
- Jean Constance Ogden, Secretary and Organiser, The Norwich Society.
- Sadie O'Kane, Nursing Sister, Belfast City Hospital.
- Frederick Arthur John Orledge, Production Director, Wardle Storeys.
- Hugh Henry Bayley Oswell, managing director, Submarine Products Ltd.
- Keith Alexander Pardoe, BEM, Field Support Manager, Customer Support Division, Westland Group plc.
- Noel Parry. For services to disabled people in Clwyd.
- Alan Paul. For political and public service.
- John Hubert Petit, lately Harbour Master, Guernsey.
- James Garfield Phillips. For services to agriculture in Wales.
- Gerta Regine (Traudi) Plesch. For charitable services.
- (Ruby) Norma Poole, Superintendent, Thrapston Boat Station, Leicester Unit Sea Cadet Corps.
- Robert Vernon Porter. For political and public service.
- Edwin Power. For services to the community in Newcastle upon Tyne.
- Kathleen Mary Preston. For services to the Walsall Branch, Soldiers', Sailors' and Airmen's Families Association.
- Edward Emmanuel Quiligotti, chairman, A. Quiligotti & Company Ltd, Stockport.
- Kenneth Charles Quinton, lately Director of Research, British Cable Services Ltd.
- David Ernest Arthur Rackliffe, lately Detective Superintendent, Kent Constabulary.
- James Joseph Ray, chairman, Avon War Pensions Committee.
- David Thomas Rees, Director, Microelectronics Education Unit, Wales.
- Garnet William Reid, Secretary, Duncan of Jordanstone College of Art, Dundee.
- Maurice Arthur Ribbans, Principal Lands Officer, Sir Owen Williams & Partners.
- Peter Richardson, Secretary General, the Confederation of British Wool & Textiles Ltd.
- Emmeline Mary Carmella Riddell, Project Organiser, Jalchatra Trust.
- Harry Roberts, Clwyd County Co-ordinator for mathematics teaching in the primary phase.
- John Ellis Roberts, Head Warden, Snowdonia National Park.
- Duncan Robertson, managing director, LHD (Fisheries) Ltd, Lerwick.
- Joy Louise Robilliard. For political service.
- Joseph William Middleton Robson, Group Training Manager, Tyneside Training Services Ltd.
- Maurice Robert Romilly. For political service.
- George Dennis Rose. For services to the community particularly disabled people in Barrow-in-Furness.
- Gordon James Roser, lately Higher Executive Officer, Department of Energy.
- Duncan Ross, Member, Countryside Commission for Scotland.
- Eileen Florence Rossiter, Director of Nursing Services and Assistant General Manager, Community Health Unit, Gwent Health Authority.
- Kathleen Julie Ruel, chairman, League of Friends, Broadmoor Hospital.
- Patrick Lewis Russell. For services to agriculture in Wales.
- Derek Joseph Rye, Collector (Higher Grade), Board of Inland Revenue.
- Geoffrey Sanders. For services to Canoeing.
- Samuel Sennett, President, The Royal Air Forces Association, Jersey.
- The Honourable Helen Service, DL, chairman, Perth and Kinross Association of Voluntary Service.
- Malcolm Leonard Shakesby, Chief Officer, Duke of Anglia.
- Kenneth David Shakeshaft, Higher Executive Officer, Department of Health and Social Security.
- William Eric Sharpe, General Manager, Operations, London Underground Ltd.
- Robert John Shepherd, Chief Superintendent, Metropolitan Police.
- Eve Sheppard, Area Organiser, London North East, Women's Royal Voluntary Service.
- Donald Kirby Shires, Personnel Manager, Thorn EMI Electronics Ltd.
- Gordon Simpson, Forest Officer II, Forestry Commission.
- Stanley Edward Skippings, chairman, Birmingham Branch, Royal Marines Association.
- Ronald Soanes, Senior Professional and Technology Officer, Department of Transport.
- Alexander Thomas Sowerby, chairman, Waltham Forest Branch, MENCAP.
- Gene Donald Spenceley, Research Manager, Process Development and Site Manager, Teesside Laboratories, British Steel Corporation.
- Christine Ann Spetch, Social Worker, Headquarters British Communication Zone, British Army of the Rhine, SSAFA.
- Flight Lieutenant Frederick Richard Stage, RAFVR (Retd.), chairman, Civilian Welfare Committee, No. 173 (Orpington) Squadron Air Training Corps.
- Gerald Thomas Edwin Stevens, lately Executive Officer Finance, Western Wessex Territorial Auxiliary and Volunteer Association.
- Lieutenant Commander James Stewart, Royal Navy (Retd.), lately Area Marketing Manager, STC Submarine Systems Ltd. For services to Export.
- William Joseph Stewart. For voluntary services to musical education.
- Julia Stretton, Treasurer, Regular Forces Employment Association.
- William Victor Sumner, Director, Portsmouth Area Enterprise.
- Ivy Elizabeth Sutcliffe. For political and public service.
- David John Tate, Technical Director, 'Lilliput Lane'.
- Barbara Joyce Taylor, Chief Welfare Officer, British Army of the Rhine, St. John and Red Cross Hospitals Welfare.
- Kenneth Taylor. For services to the National Children's Home, North East Region.
- Brian John Thetford, Chief Executive, Newbury District Council.
- Peter Wentworth Thompson, Consultant Anaesthetist, University Hospital, Wales. For services to the British Standards Institute.
- Trevor Antony Clifford Thompson, lately Director of Housing, North Herts District Council.
- Angus Cochrane Thorburn, Accountant, Head Office Risley Site, British Nuclear Fuels plc.
- Elizabeth Mary Thornton (Mrs. Craig), lately Director, Adoption Services, Scottish Adoption Association Ltd.
- Sheila Mary Thorpe, lately Higher Executive Officer, University Grants Committee.
- Phyllis Throp. For services to the community in Pudsey, West Yorkshire.
- Hugh Brown Torrance, chairman, Scottish Liaison Committee, Building Societies' Association.
- Richard Thomas John Tree, chairman, Form & Surface Grinding Ltd, Mid Glamorgan.
- Andrew Lyall Tulley, chairman, Ettrick and Lauderdale District Council.
- Adam Raymond Turnbull, Export Director, Melroses Ltd, Edinburgh.
- Gabrielle Marie Villermet, Senior Technical Officer, Institute of Ophthalmology, University of London.
- Audrey Margaret Viner, lately Senior Executive Officer, Ministry of Defence.
- Jennie Waiyaki, Assistant County Librarian, Schools Library Service, Northumberland County Council.
- Kenneth Charles Walker, Chief Executive, Association of Sound and Communications Engineering.
- Theresa Winifred Walker, Administrative Officer, Manpower Services Commission.
- William Sydney Walkinshaw, Senior Executive Officer, Department of Trade and Industry.
- Olive Smith Waller, chairman, Mansfield Committee, Cancer Research Campaign.
- John James Walsh, Member, London Borough of Waltham Forest.
- Elaine Waterson, Member, Northern Ireland Tourist Board.
- David Lennox Watson, chairman, Ulster Savings Committee, Portadown.
- Lilian Weston, Health Visitor, Miriam Clinic, Birkenhead.
- Winifred Mary Wheeler. For services to the elderly in Leicester.
- Frank George Whiteman, lately Treasurer, Management Committee, Eastbourne Citizens' Advice Bureau.
- Reverend Glynn Meirion Williams, chairman, Wales Council for the Blind.
- Bessie Annabella Crompton Wilson, Headteacher, Bank School, Cumnock, Ayrshire.
- Donald Charles Wilson, lately Chief Superintendent, West Midlands Police.
- Robert Joseph Wilson, Area Manager, Ulsterbus.
- Charles Alfred Winter, Senior Executive Officer, Board of Inland Revenue.
- George Findlay Wood, lately Director of Nursing Services, Mental Handicap, Basildon and Thurrock Health Authority.
- Ronald Albert Wooding, Local Officer I, Department of Health and Social Security.
- Jack William Wymer. For services to the Disabled in Norwich.
- Margaret Eileen Wymer. For services to the Disabled in Norwich.
- Ronald William Young, Space Systems Consultant, Space and Communications Division, British Aerospace plc.
- Michael John Youngs, MC, Trustee, Great Hospital Charity, Norwich.

Diplomatic Service and Overseas List

- Jane, Lady Akers-Jones, Chief Commissioner, Girl Guides, Hong Kong.
- Barbara Mary Blackwell. For services to the British community in Brussels.
- Lieutenant Commander Harold John Ernest Brickwood, Royal Navy (Retd). For services to youth and the community in Hong Kong.
- John William Chincotta, Head Teacher, Education Department, Gibraltar.
- Richard Granville Scale Cole. For services to British commercial interests in Tokyo.
- Joan Cooper. For nursing and welfare services to the community in Muscat.
- Margaret Elizabeth Eaton. For nursing and welfare services to the community in Kiribati.
- Captain Anthony Fleming. For services to British interests in Oman.
- Albert Leslie Fuller. For services to engineering development in Kenya.
- John Andrew Furze. For community services in the Cayman Islands.
- Sterling Wellington Garland, Secretary for Natural Resources, Turks and Caicos Islands.
- Peter Sharman-Golding, Commercial Officer, H.M. Embassy, Panama City.
- Lionel Victor Gomez, Professional and Technical Officer, Public Works Department, Gibraltar.
- Derek Barrington Gore, Honorary British Consul, Acapulco.
- Anthony Gross. For services to Royal Navy ex-servicemen in Paris.
- John Michael Howard, Principal Industry Officer, Trade and Industry Department, Hong Kong.
- Marjorie Elizabeth Joseph, Staff Nurse, Health Department, Montserrat.
- Patricia Ann Vivian Kerr. For welfare services to children in Bangladesh.
- Elizabeth Anne Klapper De Velasco. For nursing and welfare services to the community in Ecuador.
- Juliet Lambert, Private Secretary to the Governor of Bermuda.
- Lee Wing-tat, Controller of Government Supplies, Hong Kong.
- Paul Andre Leseur. For public services in Bermuda.
- Sonia Lind, Personal Secretary, Commercial Section, H.M. Embassy, Stockholm.
- Yvonne McKetney. For services to the community in the British Virgin Islands.
- The Reverend John Charles Eastmead McQuillan. For services to education in Kenya.
- Sybil Margaret Melchers. For services to the British community in Brussels.
- Dr. Ian Gordon Mowat, lately Chief Medical Officer, Guadalcanal, Solomon Islands.
- Gordon Arthur Page. For services to the community in Mexico City.
- Lois Marion Roselyn Perinchief. For services to the community in Bermuda.
- Nadine Peroni. For services to the British community in Asunción.
- The Reverend Brother John Phillips, FMS. For services to education in Cameroon.
- Ramanathan Pillai, Administration Officer, British Deputy High Commission, Madras.
- Hazel Evelyn Plaits. For welfare services to the community in Calcutta.
- Ingeborg Pope, Clerk/Typist, British Military Government, Berlin.
- Donald Stanley Price, Second Secretary, H.M. Embassy, Warsaw.
- Dr. William Reed. For services to the development of agriculture in Hyderabad.
- Eric Richards, lately Regional Director, British Council, Cape Town.
- Anahid Salakian, Personal Assistant to H.M. Consul-General, Boston.
- Marlene Silva, lately Consular Assistant, H.M. Embassy, Santiago.
- Norman Stead. For services to British commercial interests in Malawi.
- John Hope Stuart-Jervis, Honorary Royal Naval Liaison Officer, St. Croix, U.S. Virgin Islands.
- Captain Keith Parker Tibbetts. For services to the community in the Cayman Islands.
- Rachel Mary Joyce Van Der Wilden. For services to Anglo-Netherlands relations.
- Robert Anthony Britcliffe Walkden. For services to R.A.F. ex-servicemen in Belgium.
- Sara Walker. For services to English language teaching in Brasília.
- Peter Malcolm Watson. For services to British commercial interests in Gabon.
- Cyril Stanley Widgery, lately Administration Officer, Aid Department, British High Commission, Nairobi.
- Clive Willey, Second Secretary, British High Commission, Nairobi.
- Trevor Ayton Williams. For services to education in Jedda.
- Brian John Wills, BEM, lately Archivist, British High Commission, Suva.
- Wong Chun Wan, Departmental Secretary, City and New Territories Administration, Hong Kong.
- Harold George Wootton. For services to the British community in Berlin.
- Yip Kwok-hung, Assistant Principal Immigration Officer, Hong Kong.

=== Companion of the Imperial Service Order (ISO) ===
Home Civil Service

- Martin James Barber, Chief Examiner, Board of Inland Revenue.
- Frank Gordon Barker, Assistant Collector, Board of Customs and Excise.
- John Henry Boon, Senior Principal Scientific Officer, Ministry of Defence.
- William Raymond Bere Carter, Agricultural Advisory Officer I, Ministry of Agriculture, Fisheries and Food.
- Samuel Leslie Coffey, Grade 7, Ministry of Defence.
- John Robert Corkhill, Senior Principal Scientific Officer, Ministry of Defence.
- Captain David Ross Corse, Marine Superintendent, Department of Agriculture and Fisheries for Scotland.
- Anne Margaret Dickinson, lately Grade 7, Cabinet Office.
- Kevin Luke Grace Follin, Principal, Department of Health and Social Security.
- Harold Charles Greenwood, lately Grade 7, Department of Trade and Industry.
- Bernard Stockman Griffiths, Grade 6, Department of the Environment.
- William Edward Griffiths, Inspector (SP), Board of Inland Revenue.
- James Joseph Herron, lately Principal, Northern Ireland Civil Service.
- Philip Baylis Jones, Inspector (SP), Board of Inland Revenue.
- Sidney Jones, Principal, Department of Health and Social Security.
- Norman Arthur George Leppard, Principal Scientific Officer, Ministry of Defence.
- Roy Alexander McDowall, lately Grade 6, Home Office.
- Ian Douglas Neilson, Grade 6, Department of Transport.
- Sidney Charles Pennock, Principal, Overseas Development Administration.
- John Edgar Tyrer, Foreign and Commonwealth Office.
- Albert Clifford Welch, Principal, Department of Enercy.
- Edna Mary Winstanley, Grade 7, Department of Trade and Industry.
- Roy Henry Woodcock, Grade 6, Department of Employment.

Diplomatic Service and Overseas List

- Tyebjee Hatam Barma, Commissioner, Export Credit Insurance Corporation, Hong Kong.
- Dr. Sylvia Chan Chui Sai-bun, Senior Assistant Director, Medical and Health Department, Hong Kong.
- Robert Holmes, QFSM, CPM, Director of Fire Services, Hong Kong.
- Patrick Sham Pak, JP, Director, Royal Observatory, Hong Kong.

=== British Empire Medal (BEM) ===
Military Division

Royal Navy

- Chief Petty Officer Air Engineering Artificer (WL) Paul Austen, D077931G.
- Charge Chief Weapon Engineering Artificer Anthony Michael Babb, D082321B.
- Chief Petty Officer (Diver) Christopher John Ballinger, D055789G.
- Corporal Neil Richard Bowman, Royal Marines, P025859K.
- Master At Arms Christopher Terence Vine Budden, D062183K.
- Chief Petty Officer Air Engineering Artificer (M) Christopher Burrows, D082364U.
- Charge Chief Marine Engineering Artificer (P) Robert Alfred Charity, D159795J.
- Chief Petty Officer Weapon Engineering Artificer Stanley John Collins, D055261Y.
- Charge Chief Air Engineering Artificer Paul Day, F957094T.
- Chief Petty Officer Wren (R) (CA) Eileen May Gardiner, W121890L.
- Chief Petty Officer (MW) Brian Haley, D073753J.
- Chief Petty Officer Weapon Engineering Mechanic Eric Herron, D057088A.
- Master At Arms Philip John Kingston, M978234W.
- Chief Petty Officer (MW) Bruce Geoffrey Lynn, Royal Naval Reserve, D986152G.
- Chief Petty Officer Cook Geoffrey Richard Anderson Mazzoni, D103751D.
- Medical Technician 1st Class (L) Paul O'Callaghan, D144183E.
- Chief Petty Officer Weapon Engineering Artificer (Wd) Andrew James Porter, D156818D.
- Chief Petty Officer (PRI) Michael John Reed, J889550W.
- Chief Petty Officer (Ops) (S) (SM) Derek Robert Shaw, D077806S.
- Chief Petty Officer Wren Writer Elizabeth Jane Walsh, W122322Y.

Army

- 24239081 Sergeant Neil Vincent Abdy, Corps of Royal Military Police.
- 24336959 Sergeant Alan Ashcroft, Royal Army Ordnance Corps.
- 24245263 Staff Sergeant Nigel Attwood, Wessex Regiment Territorial Army.
- W/0392537 Sergeant Phyllis Margaret Bates, Women's Royal Army Corps, Territorial Army.
- 24209175 Staff Sergeant Basil George Beardsley, Corps of Royal Electrical and Mechanical Engineers.
- 24299785 Staff Sergeant Melvyn Arthur Bennett, Royal Corps of Transport.
- 24396154 Sergeant James Billinger, Royal Army Ordnance Corps.
- 24385426 Sergeant Paul John Blackhurst, Royal Army Ordnance Corps.
- 24395613 Corporal Lyndon Brooke, Corps of Royal Electrical and Mechanical Engineers.
- 24267618 Staff Sergeant David Reginald Bugler, Royal Corps of Transport.
- 24392922 Lance Bombardier Colin Keith Carr, Royal Regiment of Artillery.
- 24483382 Corporal Mark Anthony Collins, Corps of Royal Engineers.
- 24294052 Staff Sergeant Paul Philip Crampton, Corps of Royal Military Police.
- 23732744 Staff Sergeant George Curran, 52nd Lowland Volunteers, Territorial Army.
- 24242706 Staff Sergeant Paul Danson, The King's Own Royal Border Regiment.
- 24170527 Staff Sergeant Andrew Robert Davidson, Corps of Royal Electrical and Mechanical Engineers.
- 23988178 Staff Sergeant Ian George Edwards, The Worcestershire and Sherwood Foresters Regiment (29th/45th foot).
- 24249046 Staff Sergeant Robert Elliot, The Argyll and Sutherland Highlanders (Princess Louise's).
- 24290977 Staff Sergeant Michael Reginald England, Corps of Royal Engineers.
- 24197165 Sergeant Trevor Evans, The Royal Green Jackets.
- 23898069 Staff Sergeant Peter Anthony Findell, Royal Corps of Signals.
- W/0458890 Sergeant Angela Margaret Forsyth, Women's Royal Army Corps.
- 24264363 Staff Sergeant Graham John Fuery, Corps of Royal Electrical and Mechanical Engineers.
- 24241969 Staff Sergeant Douglas John George, The Royal Anglian Regiment, Territorial Army.
- 23696545 Staff Sergeant Raymond Stanley Guthrie Georgeson, Royal Corps of Signals, Territorial Army.
- W/0459503 Staff Sergeant Aine Main Godfrey, Women's Royal Army Corps.
- 24277031 Sergeant John Alfred Graham, The Black Watch (Royal Highland Regiment).
- 24092942 Sergeant Richard Bernard Hall, The Queen's Royal Irish Hussars.
- 24085806 Sergeant Edward Hanratty, Corps of Royal Engineers, Territorial Army.
- 23698547 Staff Sergeant William Anthony Harold, The Parachute Regiment, Territorial Army.
- 24127843 Staff Sergeant William Heelan, Royal Corps of Signals.
- 24004821 Staff Sergeant Edmond Gordon Hewitt, Royal Regiment of Artillery.
- 23898876 Sergeant Andrew Robin Hounsell, The Royal Regiment of Fusiliers.
- 24354557 Sergeant Philip Barrie Hunt, Royal Corps of Signals, Territorial Army.
- 24225873 Staff Sergeant Robert Richard Irvine, The Royal Welch Fusiliers.
- 21162240 Sergeant Khagendra Rai, 10th Princess Mary's Own Gurkha Rifles.
- 24270307 Sergeant John James Vincent McEvoy, The Royal Green Jackets.
- W/0454036 Corporal Carrie Elizabeth McKeon, Women's Royal Army Corps.
- 23813155 Staff Sergeant Geofrey Morrish, The Royal Green Jackets, Territorial Army.
- 23911465 Staff Sergeant Thomas George Padden, Royal Corps of Signals, Territorial Army.
- 24330557 Lance Corporal Donald George Pemberton, Royal Corps of Transport.
- 24471198 Lance Corporal Wyndham Arwel Pemberton, Royal Corps of Signals.
- 24343871 Staff Corporal Terence Alan Pendry, The Blues and Royals (Royal Horse Guards and 1st Dragoons).
- 24229598 Staff Sergeant David Ian Pitman, Royal Pioneer Corps.
- 24169608 Sergeant David John Playford, The Parachute Regiment.
- 23219808 Staff Sergeant George Stewart Pringle, Queen's Own Highlanders (Seaforth and Camerons).
- 24290090 Staff Sergeant Stephen James Roberts, Corps of Royal Engineers.
- 22175294 Sergeant Geoffrey Hill Robinson, Royal Army Pay Corps, Territorial Army.
- 23908098 Staff Sergeant David Charles Sandfield, Royal Army Ordnance Corps.
- 23854407 Staff Sergeant John Scotson, The Royal Regiment of Fusiliers, Territorial Army.
- 24318024 Staff Sergeant David Scott, Officers Training Corps, Territorial Army.
- 21160923 Sergeant Shivabahadur Biswakarma, 6th Queen Elizabeth's Own Gurkha Rifles.
- 24082571 Bombardier Howard Robert Simcox, Royal Regiment of Artillery.
- 24143834 Corporal Timothy James Spearey, The Gloucestershire Regiment.
- 24474426 Lance Corporal Andrew George Steer, The Black Watch (Royal Highland Regiment).
- 24509862 Corporal Neil Stephen Stock, Corps of Royal Engineers.
- 24056629 Staff Sergeant Paul William Stow, Royal Tank Regiment.
- 24053928 Staff Sergeant Paul Leroy Summerhayes, Corps of Royal Engineers.
- 24202868 Corporal Roland Eric Symonds, Royal Corps of Transport.
- 23879175 Staff Sergeant Raymond Taylor, Coldstream Guards.
- 24213639 Staff Sergeant Glenn Bradley Ternent, The Royal Green Jackets.
- 24494340 Corporal Gary Thompson, Royal Army Ordnance Corps.
- 23985844 Corporal Donald Arthur Topp, Wessex Regiment, Territorial Army.
- 23967949 Sergeant Andrew John Triggs, The Devonshire and Dorset Regiment (Now Discharged).
- 24068336 Sergeant David John Walker, Royal Corps of Signals.
- 24349757 Corporal Paul Ward, Corps of Royal Engineers.
- 24215325 Corporal Christopher Paul Wilson, The Queen's Own Hussars.
- Overseas Award British Empire Medal (Military Division) BEM.
- Staff Sergeant Tam Wing-Chu, Royal Hong Kong Regiment (The Volunteers).

Royal Air Force

- R8000821 Sergeant Graham Philip Brewer, Royal Air Force.
- U4159323 Chief Technician George Greenhill Brown, Royal Air Force.
- B4264589 Chief Technician Denis Buckley, Royal Air Force.
- E4286443 Sergeant Thomas Harpur Carson Calvert, Royal Air Force.
- P4281146 Flight Sergeant Owen Connell, Royal Air Force.
- P4266501 Flight Sergeant Gabriel Costello, Royal Air Force.
- A8072048 Flight Sergeant Alan James Day, Royal Air Force.
- S8088330 Flight Sergeant Eric Charles Day, Royal Air Force Regiment.
- P4280436 Flight Sergeant Andrew McFarlane Forrester, Royal Air Force.
- L0683502 Flight Sergeant Anthony Raymond Peter Goodwin, Royal Air Force.
- E0689073 Flight Sergeant David Ernest Green, Royal Air Force.
- X2580270 Flight Sergeant Edward William Ernest Guy, Royal Air Force.
- S4260900 Flight Sergeant Geoffrey Nathan Hall, Royal Air Force.
- G1934894 Flight Sergeant James Kissick Henderson, Royal Air Force.
- G0687736 Flight Sergeant Colin James Godfrey Hicks, Royal Air Force.
- K0683717 Flight Sergeant John Albert Langcake, Royal Air Force.
- A4248051 Flight Sergeant John Duncan O'Connor, Royal Air Force.
- P8075073 Flight Sergeant Lawrence Jeffrey Pennington Parr, Royal Air Force Regiment.
- D4285884 Flight Sergeant Alun Price, Royal Air Force Regiment.
- XI961747 Flight Sergeant Donald Allen Shanks, Royal Air Force.
- H4286608 Chief Technician David John Tichener, Royal Air Force.
- E1950355 Flight Sergeant George Kevan Timms, Royal Air Force.
- R0594521 Sergeant Peter George Weatherill, Royal Air Force.
- J4276218 Sergeant David Cyril White, Royal Auxiliary Air Force Regiment.

Civil Division

United Kingdom

- Godfrey George Ablard, Sergeant, British Transport Police, British Railways.
- Muriel Florence Ackworth, Junior Leader, Newbury Centre, Berkshire Branch, The British Red Cross Society.
- Kenneth Sydney Adams, Craftsman Painter, Ash Grove Garage, London Buses Ltd.
- Sardar Ali, Community Relations Worker, Burton-on-Trent.
- Alexander Bennett Allan, Range Warden, Blairadam Range, Territorial Auxiliary and Volunteer Reserve Association.
- Doris Eva Allis, Wages Clerk and Canteen Manageress, Kirton Brickworks, Nottinghamshire.
- William George Apter, Chauffeur to the Vice-Chancellor, University of Liverpool.
- Daphne Arscott, Bristol City Organiser, Women's Royal Voluntary Service.
- John Arthur Edwin Astman, lately Technician IIA, British Telecommunications plc.
- Thomas Dewhurst Atkinson, Head Foreman, Heavy Engineering Department, Vickers Shipbuilding & Engineering Ltd.
- John Legat Bain, Service Engineer, Product Support Group, Ferranti Defence Systems Ltd.
- Kenneth George Francis Balfour, MC, Subpostmaster to multiple offices in London and Home Counties, The Post Office.
- Richard Garston Barber. For services to the community in Worth, Kent.
- Derrick Roy Barker, Foreign and Commonwealth Office.
- Mary Dalgetty Baxter. For charitable services in Galashiels.
- Philip Bayford, lately Distribution Foreman, Eastern Electricity Board.
- Joan Bell. For services to the Humberside Leukaemia Research Fund.
- Kenneth Raymond Benney, Professional and Technology Officer, Planning Department, Devonport Management Ltd.
- Marion Patricia Bere. For services to the Berlin Military Welfare Service.
- Leslie Ernest Gordon Blake, Senior Prison Officer, HM Prison Dartmoor.
- John Bonser, Underground Fitter, Annesley Colliery, Nottinghamshire Area, British Coal Corporation.
- Keith Bottomley, Housekeeper, Hatchards Ltd.
- William Bowie, lately Chief Works Officer (Class II), HM Prison, Perth.
- Muriel Patricia Bowker. For services to Manchester Family Practitioners Committee.
- Victor Bernard Bowman, Centre Organiser, Norwich Branch, The British Red Cross Society.
- William Spence Brack, Ganger, Forestry Commission.
- Edward Robert Brewer, Storekeeper, Swindon Supplies Depot, The Post Office.
- Anthony Brooks, Telephone Switchboard Operator, Manpower Services Commission.
- Elizabeth Freda Brown, Telephonist and Receptionist, Northern Ireland Railways.
- Jack Brown, Assistant Parks Superintendent, Department of the Environment.
- John Taggart Brown, Chief Officer II, HM Detention Centre Eastwood Park.
- Margaret Isabel Patricia Burford, Subpostmistress, Stockbridge TSO, Edinburgh, The Post Office.
- Frederick Maurice Burge, Supervisory Caretaker, Helston School, Cornwall Local Education Authority.
- Robert Burrows, For services to Buxton Opera House.
- Patrick Albert Charles Byrne, Constable, Metropolitan Police.
- Alexander Robertson Calder, Chargehand Fitter, Ministry of Defence.
- Norman George Catto. For services to the North East Branch, Far East Prisoners of War Association.
- Lucille Adele Chorley. For services to The Friends of St Thomas' Hospital.
- William Joseph Church, Superintendent Registrar, Forest of Dean.
- John Churchill, Sheet Metal Worker, Ministry of Defence.
- James Dudley Henderson Clarke. For services to the London Marathon Race.
- Dennis Clifton, Advanced Mining Instructor, Bentinck/Moorgreen Training Centre, Nottinghamshire Area, British Coal Corporation.
- James Clunie, Final Assembly Superintendent, Steelwork, Yarrow Shipbuilders Ltd.
- Andrew Coogan. For services to the Tayside Amateur Athletic Club.
- Winifred Alison Cooper, Supervisor of Government Telephonists, Ministry of Defence.
- Jack Wyndham Cox, lately Surveyor Higher Grade, Ordnance Survey.
- Thomas Hill Crymble, Professional and Technical Officer, Police Authority for Northern Ireland.
- May Victoria Cummins, Foster Mother, Eastern Health and Social Services Board, Northern Ireland.
- Raymond Andrew Cummins, Sergeant, Royal Ulster Constabulary.
- Terence James William Curno, Professional and Technology Officer, Production Department, Devonport Management Ltd.
- Gavin Fleming Currie, Bookbinder, William Collins plc, Bishopbriggs.
- Arthur James Davey, MM, Works Superintendent, East Surrey Water Company.
- Anne Eva Rosalind Davies. For services to the community in Llanybydder, Dyfed.
- Haydn Theodore Davies. For services to the Muscular Dystrophy movement in Wales.
- William Victor Dawe, Foundry Tooling Engineer, Stone Foundries Ltd.
- John Clarence William Day, Observer, Walsall, Meteorological Office.
- William Thomas Deane, Superintendent, Dogs Home, Swansea.
- George William Dellar, Telephonist, East Anglian Regional Health Authority Headquarters.
- Francis Patrick Diamond, lately Drilling Rig Supervisor, Department of the Environment, Northern Ireland.
- Joseph Munro Donnelly, lately Senior Personnel and Industrial Relations Manager, Govan Shipbuilders Ltd.
- Margaret Frew Dowding, Writer, Ministry of Defence.
- John Edward Dowle, Orbital Prosthetist, Moorfields Eye Hospital, Department of Health and Social Security.
- Sheila Duffield, Metropolitan Organiser, Sandwell, Women's Royal Voluntary Service.
- Joseph Duffy, Foreman, Inspection and Warehouse Despatch Departments, Building Materials Producers.
- Florence Dunn, Head Housemaid, House of Lords.
- Colin Durant, Nursing Auxiliary, Currie Ward, Young Disabled Unit, Central Nottinghamshire Health Authority.
- Edwin Robert William Earl, Transducer Supervisor, J & S Marine Ltd.
- George Earnshaw. For services to youth in Newport, Gwent.
- Myra Eastwood, Foster Parent, Cleveland County Council Social Services Department.
- Bernard Elwall, Craftsman 1, Ministry of Defence.
- John Leslie Rees Evans, Constable, Metropolitan Police.
- Rowland Fairest, Mill Motor Driver, Templeborough Rolling Mills Ltd.
- Bertha Patricia Farren, Local Organiser, Clayton-le-Moors, Women's Royal Voluntary Service.
- John Finnigan, Storekeeper, Western Region, British Railways.
- Warren John Thomas Fisher, lately Origination Operator, HM Stationery Office.
- Stanley John Fleming, Gardener, Ministry of Defence.
- Brian Foley, Constable, Lancashire Constabulary.
- Dennis Forsyth, Sergeant, Warwickshire Constabulary.
- Lawrence Victor Ansell Forsyth, Chorister and Tutor, Roman Catholic Cathedral, Northampton.
- Reginald Foster, Convener Steward, Bovis Construction Ltd.
- John Goodwin Freeman, Chief Naval Auxiliaryman, London Unit, Royal Naval Auxiliary Service.
- Gordon Victor Furze, Mechanician, Ministry of Defence.
- Jean Adeline Gaskell. For services to the Lancashire Association of Boys' Clubs.
- Peter Batey Gidley, Sub-Officer, West Midlands Fire Service.
- Peter Godfrey, Craftsman Chargehand, Ministry of Defence.
- David Lawrence Godley, Constable, Norfolk Constabulary.
- Frederick James Gogin, Driver, Premier Travel Cambridge.
- Jack Henry Gorvin, Machine Operator, South Wales Electricity Board.
- Gwenda Audrey Grainger, Office Keeper I, Department of Trade and Industry.
- Raymond Edward Grant, Shipwright, Ministry of Defence.
- Edgar Wilfred Gray, Chargehand/Craftsman, Ministry of Defence.
- George William Greasley. For services to the Rolls-Royce Works Band.
- Alice Miller Green, Chauffeuse, Dounreay Nuclear Power Development Establishment, United Kingdom Atomic Energy Authority.
- Barbara Jean Greenfield, Local Organiser, Denham, Women's Royal Voluntary Service.
- John David Griffiths, Leading Fireman, Dyfed County Fire Service.
- Douglas Howard Grist, Driver, Western Region, British Railways.
- Eric Willson Gudger, lately Driver, London Midland Region, British Railways.
- David Sydney Gurd, Constable, Hampshire Constabulary.
- Sheila Gurney, Supervising Tours Organiser, Coalport Division, Wedgwood plc.
- Lettice May Gutberlet. For services to mentally disabled people in Enfield, Middlesex.
- Gwendolen Hale. For services to the British Red Cross Society in Beckenham, Kent.
- Bernard Hall, Craftsman I, Ministry of Defence.
- Carlotta Hall, lately Domestic Assistant, Great Ormond Street Hospital, Hospital for Sick Children, Special Health Authority.
- Arthur Edward Ham. For services to the community in Charlcombe, Avon.
- Douglas George Hamill, Special Constable, Fife Constabulary.
- Charles Aickman Hankins. For services to The Royal Star and Garter Home, Richmond, Surrey.
- Norma Harrison, Deputy Organiser, City of Hull, Women's Royal Voluntary Service.
- Charles George Hatcher, lately Coxswain, Blyth Lifeboat, Royal National Lifeboat Institution.
- Russell Eric Vincent Herbert, lately Production Manager, Guilford Kapwood Ltd.
- Thomas Edwin Hetherington, Observer, No 8 Group, Coventry, Royal Observer Corps.
- Osbert Hicks, Auxiliary Coastguard in charge, St Agnes, Isles of Scilly.
- Thomas Laurence Hodgson, National Nature Reserve Warden, Mendip Reserves.
- John Clark Hughes, Works Manager, French Kier Construction.
- Henry Huitson, Chief Reprographics Officer, Department of Trade and Industry.
- Ceinwen Ann Humphreys. For services to the community in Tonyrefail, Mid Glamorgan.
- Edith Joan Huntley. For services to the Humberside County Branch, Soldiers' Sailors' and Airmen's Families Association.
- Samuel John Irwin, Chief Officer, Grade II, Northern Ireland Prison Service.
- Henry James John Johnson, Constable, Port of London Authority Police Force.
- Dorothy Jones, Draughtswoman, North Western Electricity Board.
- George Frederick Jones, Senior Paperkeeper, Department of Transport.
- Leslie Brian Jones, Senior Foreman, Development Equipping and Final Assembly, Military Aircraft Division, Warton, British Aerospace plc.
- Jane Muir Kelly, Co-ordinator, Olivebank Children's Centre, Musselburgh.
- Harry King, Association Secretary, Federation of British Hand Tool Manufacturers.
- Daniel Kitchen, Supervisor, Short Bros plc.
- Ronald Knox, Garage Supervisor, Kendal Avenue, British Broadcasting Corporation.
- Lam Bee Cheuk, Foreign and Commonwealth Office.
- Leonard Leslie Lane, Radio Technician, Metropolitan Police.
- Albert Last. For services to the Royal British Legion in Nottingham.
- Thomas Gordon Powell Ledger, Buildings Manager, Leicester City Council.
- Martin Carey Leigh, Constable, Metropolitan Police.
- Halcot Cecil David Lewis, Professional and Technology Officer, Ministry of Defence.
- Sarah Murray Lind. For services to The Princess Louise Scottish Hospital.
- Alan Lockett, Shipwright Loftsman, Vickers Shipbuilding & Engineering Ltd.
- Frederic William Lonie, Engraving Instructor, Edinburgh Crystal, Penicuik.
- Frank Lunt, Fleet Director, Technical, British Airways plc.
- William Jason George Lynam, lately Chief Storekeeper, Highways Depot, Epsom and Ewell Borough Council.
- William Frederick McCurdy, Engineering Foreman, North Eastern Electricity Board.
- Alexander John Macdonald, Crofter and Township Clerk, Snizort, Isle of Skye.
- Margaret McGregor McGee, Services Welfare, Newcastle upon Tyne, Women's Royal Voluntary Service.
- Alexander Henderson McGhee, Senior Foreman, United Wire Ltd, Edinburgh.
- Allan Francis McGuire, Sergeant, Merseyside Police.
- Stanley McIlrath, Head Porter, Ulster Hospital, Dundonald, Belfast.
- Lachlan McIntyre, Machine Shop Superintendent, Sacol Powerline Ltd.
- John Mackenzie, Reporting Member, Gairloch Coastguard, Ross-shire.
- Gerald Davidson McLeod, Engineering Superintendent, Narrow Bodied Aircraft, British Airways plc.
- William Alfred Marchant, Senior Chargehand and Deputy Workshop Foreman, Brighton Borough Transport Ltd.
- Robert Arthur Martin. For services to the community, particularly disabled people in Nottinghamshire.
- David Lawrence Masters, Production Foreman, Ford Motor Company Ltd.
- Leonora Drayton-Meadows. For services to the Isle of Wight Community Services Council.
- Derek Malcolm Miles, Constable, West Mercia Constabulary.
- Robert James Miller, lately Reserve Constable, Royal Ulster Constabulary.
- Ronald William Morgan Millis, Detective Sergeant, Hertfordshire Constabulary.
- Charles John Mills, Superintendent, Erecting Shop, Civil Aircraft Division, British Aerospace plc.
- William Barnetson Morrison, Motor Transport Driver, Scottish Office.
- Horace Edward Murt, Mechanic, Padstow Lifeboat, Royal National Lifeboat Institution.
- Grace Napier, lately Day Cleaner, Springburn Further Education College, Glasgow.
- William Charles Leonard New. For services to Scouting in Wiltshire.
- Bernard Frank Newman, Station Officer, Bedfordshire Fire Service.
- Olive Winifred Newson, lately Principal Officer, International and Special Events Unit, Sports Council.
- James Nathaniel Nicholl, Senior Foreman, Department of Agriculture, Northern Ireland.
- Bernard Nicholls, Driver, London Midland Region, British Railways.
- Albert Edwin North. For services to youth and the community in Pontefract, West Yorkshire.
- Philip John O'Brien, Foreman Cutter, Dents Gloves Ltd.
- Mary O'Neill, Chief Officer I, HM Prison Holloway.
- Robert Henry Pagden, Heavy Goods Vehicle Driver, Southern Water Authority.
- Raymond John Parke, Professional and Technology Officer, Department of the Environment.
- Ernest John Walter Penellum. For services to the Trurp Division, Soldiers', Sailors' and Airmen's Families Association.
- James Robert Pentland, Site Services Officer, London Research Station, British Gas plc.
- William Powell, Track Chargeman, Western Region, British Railways.
- Edward Weston Pratt, Handyman, West Sussex County Council Library Service.
- Norman Pratt, Head Groundsman, Sports Ground, Woodbridge Road, Guildford Borough Council.
- Jack Friday, Force Farrier, Greater Manchester Police.
- Cyril Edgar Priestley. For services to the 988 Disabled Club, Daventry and District.
- George Robert Pringle. For services to the community in Morebattle, Roxburghshire.
- George Alfred Prior, Caretaker, Coombes County Infants' School, Berkshire Local Education Authority.
- Margaret Elizabeth Ramsay, lately Shorthand Typist, Lancashire County Council.
- William Gordon Randall, Steward, Royal Military Academy, Sandhurst.
- Jessie Marian Reed, Senior Messenger, Department of Education and Science.
- Malcolm Vincent Rhodes, Sub Officer, Nottinghamshire Fire Brigade.
- David Samuel Roberts, Surveyor Senior Grade, Ordnance Survey.
- Edward Roberts, Technical Officer, Northumbria Police.
- William McLellan Robertson, Foreman Stockman, Hannah Research Institute, Ayr.
- Arthur Geoffrey Rudd, Assistant Works Manager, North Area, Humberside County Council.
- Christopher Thomas Ruffe. For services to the community in Hereford.
- George Rumfitt, Chief Officer I, HM Prison Durham.
- Albert Francis Rutter, Senior Warehouse Foreman, Ipswich Port Authority.
- Albert William Salisbury, Electrical Fitter, Acton Works, London Regional Transport.
- Elenora Elizabeth Semple. For services to the West Down Region, Ulster Savings Movement.
- Jack Shaw, lately Foreman, Plating Shop, Ferranti Electronics Ltd.
- John Sheldon, Foreman, Dun Drainage Commissioners, Finningley, Ashfields and West Moor Internal Drainage Boards.
- Graham Anthony Shellshear, Constable, Thames Valley Police.
- Kenneth Harry Simpson, Technician, University Central Garage, University of Sheffield.
- Joseph John Sims, Civil Engineering Superintendent, Corby Tubes Division, British Steel Corporation.
- Edna Slodyczak, Sewing Machinist, Hypasafe Ltd.
- Michael Soloman, lately Pest Control Supervisor, Waveney District Council.
- Leslie Ronald Stagg, lately Tanker Driver, Petrofina (UK) Ltd.
- William Thorburn Stark, Engineer, Charles Letts (Scotland) Ltd.
- John Staunton, Works Manager, McAlpine Construction Ltd.
- Graham Storer, Depot Manager, Leicester City Bus.
- Desmond William Patrick Street, Office Keeper I, Royal Courts of Justice.
- Michael Gerald Sweeney, Enforcement Officer, Newry and Mourne District Council.
- Joan Douglas Taylor, Manager, Research and Development Section, Bonar Textiles Ltd, Dundee.
- Patricia Ursula Taylor, lately Photoprinter II, HM Treasury.
- Peter Tempest, Sergeant, West Yorkshire Police.
- Leslie Alfred Thomas. For services to No. 30F (Cardiff) Squadron, Air Training Corps.
- Michael Francis Tierney, Constable, Staffordshire Police.
- George Alfred Topping, Official, Allerton Bywater Colliery, North Yorkshire Area, British Coal, Corporation.
- Ethel Frances Varley, Librarian, Exeter Law Library.
- John James Walsh, Gangerman, Tarmac Construction Ltd.
- Willis Ward, Constable, South Yorkshire Police.
- William Harold Watson, Process and General Supervisory C, Ministry of Defence.
- Thomas Richard Corbett Weaver, Gardener, Brynhyfryd Hospital, Powys.
- William McLaughlan Weir, Technical Administrative and Supervisory Staff Union Representative, Ferranti Defence Systems Ltd.
- Douglas Welsh, Gardener Groundsman 1, Ministry of Defence.
- Norman Thomas Wendon, Stores Officer D, Ministry of Defence.
- George William Wheeldon. For services to the community in Chelmorton, Derbyshire.
- Cyril Douglas Wheeler, Supervisor (Braiding), Cyanamid of Great Britain Ltd.
- Donald Edward Whitlock, General Foreman, Southern Electricity Board.
- James Terence Whyatt, Instrument Mechanic, Springfields, British Nuclear Fuels Ltd.
- Henry Wiggin, Factory Technician 1A, Fulcrum Communications Ltd.
- Gillian Dawn Williams. For services to the Parents and Friends Committee, Holy head Sea Cadet Corps Unit.
- Norman Gilbert Williams, Driver, Avon and Somerset Constabulary.
- Louis Arthur Williamson, Welder, British Midland Airways.
- Michael John Willis, Skilled Examiner, Vickers Defence Systems.
- William Francis Wingett. For charitable services, particularly to the Wrexham and District Hospital.
- John Scott Wiseman, Laboratory Superintendent, Edinburgh School of Agriculture.
- Eric Thomas Wolfenden, Canteen Manager, HMS Eaglet, Navy, Army and Air Force Institutes.
- John Henry Woods, Technical Representative, Kingston Unit, South Eastern, British Gas plc.
- Sylvia Worsman, Anatomical Pathology Technician, Sheffield Children's Hospital, Trent Regional Health Authority.
- Margaret Jane Wright, lately Cook Supervisor, Knowsley Local Education Authority.
- Overseas Territories Mary Elizabeth Band A, District Nursing Officer, Gibraltar.
- Chan Wai-chan, Senior Clerical Officer, Departmental Administration Unit, Hong Kong.
- Joyce Ebanks, Public Health Nurse, Cayman Islands.
- Colin Green, Physical Training Officer, Fire Services Department, Hong Kong.
- Kwan Kong, Supervisor Grade III, Civil Aid Services, Hong Kong.
- Georgene Lazzari, School Supervisor, Cayman Islands.
- Ellen Lindsey. For services to Agriculture in Montserrat.
- Lui Pui-ping, Driving Instructor, Transport Department, Hong Kong.
- Ganith Bux Ng, Personal Secretary to the Postmaster General, Hong Kong.
- Alan Matthew Turnock, Systems Engineer, Electricity Department, Gibraltar.
- Woo Man-kai, Liaison Officer I, Auxiliary Medical Service, Hong Kong.

=== Royal Red Cross (RRC) ===
- Principal Nursing Officer Myrtle Evelyn Williams, ARRC, Queen Alexandra's Royal Naval Nursing Service.
- Colonel Catherine Morrison, ARRC, (441515), Queen Alexandra's Royal Army Nursing Corps.
- Major Lorna Margaret Numbers (496957), Queen Alexandra's Royal Army Nursing Corps.
- Lieutenant Colonel Margaret Anne O'Gorman, TD, (495865), Queen Alexandra's Royal Army Nursing Corps, Territorial Army.
- Wing Commander Gwendoline Mary Carmel Simpson (408234), Princess Mary's Royal Air Force Nursing Service.

==== Associate of the Royal Red Cross (ARRC) ====
- Chief Nursing Officer Virginia Christabel Fisher, Queen Alexandra's Royal Naval Nursing Service.
- Superintending Nursing Officer Elizabeth Mary Weall, Queen Alexandra's Royal Naval Nursing Service.
- Major Ann Clouston (503177), Queen Alexandra's Royal Army Nursing Corps, Territorial Army.
- Major Sarah Judith Kneale (496258), Queen Alexandra's Royal Army Nursing Corps.
- Major Peter Arthur Pocock (499920), Royal Army Medical Corps.
- T8030179 Sergeant Malcolm William Thomas Daw, Princess Mary's Royal Air Force Nursing Service.

=== Air Force Cross (AFC) ===
Royal Navy

- Lieutenant Commander Michael Seymour Burnett.

Army

- Lieutenant Erik Anderson (525185), Army Air Corps.

Royal Air Force

- Squadron Leader Paul Day (4231352), Royal Air Force.
- Flight Lieutenant David Anthony Zenthon James (608375), Royal Air Force.
- Squadron Leader Robert McLellan (2622398), Royal Air Force.
- Flight Lieutenant Henry William Pottle (4233536), Royal Air Force.
- Squadron Leader David Walker (5202834), Royal Air Force.

=== Air Force Medal (AFM) ===
- B8141334 Sergeant Donald Francis Allan Maxwell, Royal Air Force.

=== Queen's Police Medal (QPM) ===
England and Wales

- Keith Brown, Assistant Chief Constable, Lancashire Constabulary.
- Graham Burgess, Chief Superintendent, Devon and Cornwall Constabulary.
- Roger James Croome, Chief Inspector, Metropolitan Police.
- Michael John Hirst, Chief Constable, Leicestershire Constabulary.
- Alan Lloyd Hislop, Sergeant, West Midlands Police.
- John Charles Hoddinott, Deputy Chief Constable, Hampshire Constabulary.
- John Michael Mantle Huins, Deputy Assistant Commissioner, Metropolitan Police.
- Keith Elliott Hunter, Commander, Metropolitan Police.
- John Robert Myhill, Constable, Humberside Police.
- John Frederick Newing, Deputy Assistant Commissioner, Metropolitan Police.
- John Ince Papple, Superintendent, Essex Police.
- John Franklyn Poole, Chief Superintendent, Thames Valley Police.
- Brian Michael Ralls, Detective Chief Superintendent, Wiltshire Constabulary.
- Hubert Frederick George Reynolds, Assistant Chief Constable, Gloucestershire Constabulary.
- James Ernest Smedley, Chief Superintendent, Nottinghamshire Constabulary.
- Frederick Hazelton Smith, Assistant Chief Constable, Cleveland Constabulary.
- Glyn Spalding, Chief Superintendent, Bedfordshire Police.
- Frederick Charles Stanton Wyer, Chief Superintendent, Gwent Constabulary.

Northern Ireland

- Robert George Symington, Superintendent, Royal Ulster Constabulary.
- Mark Lavens Crozier, Chief Inspector, Royal Ulster Constabulary.

Hong Kong

- Hui Ki-on, CPM, Assistant Commissioner, Royal Hong Kong Police Force.
- Peter John Webb, CPM, Assistant Commissioner, Royal Hong Kong Police Force.

Scotland

- Peter Crichton Mitchell, Deputy Chief Constable, Strathclyde Police.
- Hugh Ingram Watson, Assistant Chief Constable, Lothian and Borders Police.

=== Queen's Fire Services Medal (QFSM) ===
England and Wales

- Alexander Hughes, Divisional Officer I, Oxfordshire Fire Service.
- James Leslie McMillan, Assistant Chief Officer, London Fire and Civil Defence Authority.
- Robert Vincent Gray, Assistant Chief Officer, Merseyside Fire and Civil Defence Authority.
- John Alfred Gentleman, Divisional Officer I, Wiltshire Fire Brigade.
- Thomas Albert Bailey, Assistant Chief Officer, Mid Glamorgan Fire Service.

=== Colonial Police Medal (CPM) ===
- Keith Braithwaite, Senior Superintendent, Royal Hong Kong Police Force.
- Chan Ming-chit, Station Sergeant, Royal Hong Kong Police Force.
- Cheng Koon-kwan, Superintendent, Royal Hong Kong Auxiliary Police Force.
- Chu Kwok-wai, Station Sergeant, Royal Hong Kong Police Force.
- John Christie Dunn, Senior Superintendent, Royal Hong Kong Police Force.
- Gerald Nigel Frith, Senior Superintendent, Royal Hong Kong Police Force.
- Lai Yun-shan, Senior Divisional Officer, Hong Kong Fire Services.
- Lam Cho-kin, Station Sergeant, Royal Hong Kong Police Force.
- Gregory Lam Kwai-bun, Chief Inspector, Royal Hong Kong Police Force.
- Lam Pak-kit, Principal Fireman, Hong Kong Fire Services.
- Leung Chi, Principal Fireman, Hong Kong Fire Services.
- Li Shu-fung, Chief Inspector, Royal Hong Kong Police Force.
- Lo Kei, Station Sergeant, Royal Hong Kong Police Force.
- Rab Nawaz, Chief Inspector, Royal Hong Kong Police Force.
- Ng Kit, Assistant Divisional Officer, Hong Kong Fire Services.
- Terence Orsler, Senior Superintendent, Royal Hong Kong Police Force.
- Neville James Smith, Superintendent, Royal Cayman Islands Police Force.
- Edward Joseph Stevenson, Senior Superintendent, Royal Hong Kong Police Force.
- James Henry Walker, Senior Superintendent, Royal Hong Kong Police Force.
- Wailon Edmund Warren, Deputy Commissioner, British Virgin Islands Police Force.
- David Michael Wright, Senior Superintendent, Royal Hong Kong Auxiliary Police Force.

=== Queen's Commendation for Valuable Service in the Air ===
Royal Navy

- Lieutenant Commander Andrew Raggett, Royal Navy.

Army

- Captain Anthony James Davies (519923), Army Air Corps.

Royal Air Force

- Flight Lieutenant Mark John Beardmore (8027325), Royal Air Force.
- Flight Lieutenant Stephen Biglands (5202007), Royal Air Force.
- Flight Lieutenant Walter Paul William Brown (5203356), Royal Air Force.
- Squadron Leader James Campbell Davies (4231849), Royal Air Force.
- Squadron Leader Richmond Michael Eastment (8024803), Royal Air Force.
- Flight Lieutenant Stanley Mervyn Evans (4201249), Royal Air Force.
- Squadron Leader Christopher John Finn (8026204), Royal Air Force.
- Flight Lieutenant Charles Duncan Robert McIlroy (8026713), Royal Air Force.
- Flight Lieutenant Stephen Randles (8027023), Royal Air Force.
- Squadron Leader Christopher John Taylor (687671), Royal Air Force.
- Flight Lieutenant Jonathan Webb (2624387) Royal Air Force.

United Kingdom

- Peter Gordon-Johnson, Experimental Test Pilot, Military Aircraft Division, Warton, British Aerospace plc.
- Brian Stuart Grieve, Operations Director, Britannia Airways.

=== George Medal (GM) ===
In recognition of bravery during the hazardous rescue operations after the capsize of Herald of Free Enterprise off Zeebrugge on the night of 6 March 1987.

- Andrew Clifford Parker, Assistant Bank Manager, Nippon Credit International. Passenger,Herald of Free Enterprise.
- Michael Ian Skippen (deceased), lately Head Waiter, Herald of Free Enterprise.

=== Queen's Gallantry Medal (QGM) ===
- Lieutenant Simon Nicholas Bound, Royal Navy.
- Leigh Cornelius, Seaman, MV Herald of Free Enterprise.
- Luitenant-Ter-Zee 1ste Klas Guido A. Couwenbergh, Belgian Navy.
- Luitenant-Ter-Zee 1ste Klas Alfons M. A. C. Daems, Belgian Navy.
- Able Seaman Eamon Christopher McKinley Fullen (D203106J), Royal Navy.
- Stephen Robert Homewood, Assistant Purser, MV Herald of Free Enterprise.
- Piet Lagast, Diver, Tijdelijke Vereniging Bergingswerken.
- William Sean Walker, Seaman, MV Herald of Free Enterprise.
- Thomas Hume Wilson, Quartermaster, MV Herald of Free Enterprise.
- Dirk van Mullem, Diver, Tijdelijke Vereniging Bergingswerken.

=== Queen's Commendation for Brave Conduct ===
- Chief Petty Officer Edward Gene Kerr (DO77641T), Royal Navy.
- Chief Petty Officer Peter Frank Still (DO55769W), Royal Navy.

== Australia ==
=== Knight Bachelor ===
State of Queensland

- Walter John Burnett. For services to the community.

=== Order of the Bath ===
==== Companion of the Order of the Bath (CB) ====
Civil Division

State of Tasmania

- John Russell Ashton. For public service.

=== Order of Saint Michael and Saint George ===
==== Companion of the Order of St Michael and St George (CMG) ====
State of Queensland

- John Hayward Andrews. For public service.

=== Order of the British Empire ===
==== Commander of the Order of the British Empire (CBE) ====
Civil Division

State of Queensland

- Clyde Ian Barclay. For services to the building industry and to the community.

State of Tasmania

- Edmund Alexander Rouse. For services to the community.

==== Officer of the Order of the British Empire (OBE) ====
Civil Division

State of Queensland

- Donald Francis McDonald. For services to the community.
- Gavin Samuel McDonald. For services to the mining community.
- The Reverend Andrew Robert Wilson. For services to the church and the community.
- Rodney Malcolm Wylie. For services to the accounting profession and the community.

State of Tasmania

- Patrick Guy Crisp. For services to the community.

==== Member of the Order of the British Empire (MBE) ====
Civil Division

State of Queensland

- Helen Thorburn Banff. For services to nursing.
- John Gordon Earl. For services to North Queensland.
- The Reverend Stuart McFarlane James. For services to soil conservation.
- Clive William Lanham. For services to the church and the community.
- Malcolm David McNeilly. For services to the surf life saving movement.
- Philip Roy Scott. For services to the Royal Flying Doctor Service.
- Nelson Albert Hunt Sharp. For services to the pharmaceutical profession.
- Joseph Don Wall. For services to the beef industry and the community.

State of Tasmania

- The Reverend Monsignor Philip Richard Green. For services to the church.

=== Companion of the Imperial Service Order (ISO) ===
State of Queensland

- Ivan George Harrison. For public service.

=== British Empire Medal (BEM) ===
Civil Division

State of Queensland

- Minnie Joyce Haig. For services to the community.
- Jean Hunter. For services to the community.
- Douglas Lesanto Maclean. For services to ex-servicemen and women.
- Allan Albert Maskell. For services to the community.
- Ruth Margaret Maynard. For services to the community.
- Thelma Sara McConnel. For services to disabled children.
- Margaret Alice Moore. For services to the community.
- Alma Palmer. For public service.
- Matron Carmel Margaret Pringle. For services to the aged.
- Richard David Richmond Rex. For services to the community.
- Walter Henry Speedy. For services to the community.
- Laurence John Storey. For services to the community.

State of Tasmania

- Kathleen Mary Cooper. For services to the community.
- Frank Hesman. For services to migrant families.
- Sabina Kolodziej. For services to the community.

=== Queen's Police Medal (QPM) ===
State of Queensland

- Terrence Peter McMahon, Assistant Commissioner of Police.

== Mauritius ==
=== Knight Bachelor ===
- Tseng Chi Lu, chairman, Afasia Group.

=== Order of Saint Michael and Saint George ===
==== Companion of the Order of St Michael and St George (CMG) ====
- Dyachand Heeralall, Head of the Civil Service.

=== Order of the British Empire ===
==== Officer of the Order of the British Empire (OBE) ====
Civil Division

- Ibrahim Abdoollah. For services to trade and the community.
- Latchmana Appadoo. For public service.
- Seewa Bappoo. For political service and services to the community.
- Voong Siong Chan Lam. For services to education.
- Jean Cyril Monty. For services to education and the community.
- Joseph Marcel Francis Rey. For services to labour and industrial relations.

==== Member of the Order of the British Empire (MBE) ====
Civil Division

- Rajpalsingh Allgoo. For services to the trade union movement.
- Louis Michel Jacques Carver. For public service.
- Rafick Chatharoo. For services to the community.
- Bissoondeal Hazareesing. For services to philately.
- Guy Emmanuel Paul Mounowah. For services to sport.
- Moolsankar Ramdonee. For social work.
- Pierre Claude Roussety. For public service.
- Punchanund Seeruttun. For services to the community.
- Ita Sohun. For services to the community.

=== Mauritius Police Medal (MPM) ===
- Marie Roger Gerard Palmyre, Superintendent of Police.
- Jean Oscar Philippe Reynoird, Chief Inspector of Police.
- Pierre Rene Thomas, Police Band Sergeant.
- Parsan Subron, Police Constable.

== The Bahamas ==
=== Order of the British Empire ===
==== Member of the Order of the British Empire (MBE) ====
Civil Division

- Donald Knowles. For public service.
- Elijah Coburn Sands. For public service.
- Donald Scott. For public service.
- Helen Lauretta Smith. For public service.
- Teuton Cambroke Stubbs. For services to education.

=== British Empire Medal (BEM) ===
Civil Division

- George Leroy Bethel. For public service.
- Lawrence Osborne Theodore Brown. For public service.
- Charles Edward Cash. For services to radio-telegraphy.
- Richard Encil Dean. For services to education.
- Leila Gibbs-Fountain. For services to nursing.
- McFarland Gregory Anthony McKay. For services to music.
- Ophelia Munnings. For services to nursing.
- Charles Symonette. For services to the community.
- Earlene Thompson. For services to the community.

== Grenada ==
=== Order of the British Empire ===
==== Commander of the Order of the British Empire (CBE) ====
Civil Division

- John Augustus Fitzroy Watts. For public service.

==== Officer of the Order of the British Empire (OBE) ====
Civil Division

- Ralph Matthias Bhola. For services to the community.

==== Member of the Order of the British Empire (MBE) ====
Civil Division

- Crofton McGuire. For services to the community.
- Anthony Percival Hood. For services to education.

=== British Empire Medal (BEM) ===
Civil Division

- Kyron Sylvester Charles. For services to sport.

== Papua New Guinea ==
=== Knight Bachelor ===
- Ling James Seeto, MBE. For services to business and the community.

=== Order of Saint Michael and Saint George ===
==== Companion of the Order of St Michael and St George (CMG) ====
- The Honourable Charles Dennis Young, MP. For political services and services to the community.

=== Order of the British Empire ===
==== Knight Commander of the Order of the British Empire (KBE) ====
Civil Division

- Right Reverend Bishop Saimon Gaius, OBE. For public and community service.

==== Commander of the Order of the British Empire (CBE) ====
Civil Division

- Associate Professor Isi Henao Kevau. For services to medicine and the community.
- Honourable Mr. Justice Kubulan Los. For services to law and the community.

==== Officer of the Order of the British Empire (OBE) ====
Military Division

- Lieutenant-Colonel Jack Passingan Tuat (84092). For service to the Papua New Guinea Defence Force.

Civil Division

- Wep Peter Kanawi. For public and community service.
- Moseley Moramoro. For services to education.
- Assistant Police Commissioner Samson Nuakona, MBE. For service to the Royal Papua New Guinea Constabulary.
- Assistant Police Commissioner Thomas Samai, QPM. For service to the Royal Papua New Guinea Constabulary.
- Mina Siaguru. For services to education and the community.
- John Dokoa Vulupindi. For public service.

==== Member of the Order of the British Empire (MBE) ====
Civil Division

- Dirona Abe. For public and community service.
- Senior Inspector Sandy Amos. For service to the Royal Papua New Guinea Constabulary.
- Elias Tony Amos. For services to education.
- Sister Rita Grunke. For services to the community.
- Gei Ilagi. For public service.
- Inspector Koime Ipai. For service to the Royal Papua New Guinea Constabulary.
- Senior Inspector Stephen Kepo. For service to the Royal Papua New Guinea Constabulary.
- Tapol Subonaik Konjup. For services to local government and the community.
- Philipp Miniye. For services to the community.
- Superintendent Paul Charles Rasehei. For service to the Royal Papua New Guinea Constabulary.
- Sister Mary Linus Ross. For services to education and the community.
- Ann Jaqueline Shaw. For services to the community.
- Thomas Tergog. For public service.
- Senior Inspector Aibung Tieng. For service to the Royal Papua New Guinea Constabulary.
- Andrew Trawen. For public service.

=== Companion of the Imperial Service Order (ISO) ===
- Dr. Levi Sialis. For services to health and the community.

=== British Empire Medal (BEM) ===
Military Division

- Sergeant Sylvester Meta (82186). For service to the Papua New Guinea Defence Force.
- Sergeant Andrew Miria (83352). For service to the Papua New Guinea Defence Force.
- Warrant Officer Mari Urapo (84536). For service to the Papua New Guinea Defence Force.

Civil Division

- Sergeant Ora Biliwa. For public service.
- Kamuna Dabura. For public service.
- Heni Hitolo. For public service.
- Koke Itua. For services to politics and the community.
- Pirn Korope. For services to the community.
- Cyril Frederick Nogah. For services to the community.
- Kisombo Pendene. For services to local government and the community.
- Egi David Raka. For public service.
- James Ernest Richards. For services to the community.
- Sergeant Wally Tamadai. For public service.
- Amoi Towo. For services to the community.
- Doga Vetu. For public service.
- Kina Wale. For public service.
- Wiwike Wawe. For public service.

=== Queen's Police Medal (QPM) ===
- Graham Ainui, Assistant Commissioner of Police. For service to the Royal Papua New Guinea Constabulary.
- Francis Mugugia, Assistant Commissioner of Police. For service to the Royal Papua New Guinea Constabulary.
- Gamini Ora, Assistant Commissioner of Police. For service to the Royal Papua New Guinea Constabulary.

== Solomon Islands ==
=== Order of the British Empire ===
==== Knight Commander of the Order of the British Empire (KBE) ====
Civil Division

- The Reverend Dudley Tuti, OBE. For services to the church and the community.

==== Officer of the Order of the British Empire (OBE) ====
Civil Division

- Kenneth Henry Mann. For public service.

==== Member of the Order of the British Empire (MBE) ====
Civil Division

- The Reverend Father Marvin Kigo. For services to the church and the community.
- Mulberry Tesimo. For services to medicine.

=== British Empire Medal (BEM) ===
Civil Division

- Pastor Apollos Hagaiga. For services to the church.
- Walter Ningalo. For public service.
- Jack Ramosaea. For services to the community.
- Sergeant Jonathan Tafaka. For public service.

== Saint Lucia ==
=== Order of the British Empire ===
==== Commander of the Order of the British Empire (CBE) ====
Civil Division

- Hunter Joseph François. For public service.

==== Officer of the Order of the British Empire (OBE) ====
Civil Division

- Charles Owen King. For services to medicine and the community.
- Oman Everard Monplaisir. For services to the community.

==== Member of the Order of the British Empire (MBE) ====
Civil Division

- Frances Iona Erlinger-Ford. For services to the community.
- Denise Joyce Auguste. For services to music.
- Dr. Michael Louis. For public service.

== Saint Vincent and the Grenadines ==
=== Order of the British Empire ===
==== Knight Commander of the Order of the British Empire (KBE) ====
Civil Division

- Philip Henry Veira, OBE. For public and philanthropic services.

==== Officer of the Order of the British Empire (OBE) ====
Civil Division

- John Smith. For services to the community.

==== Member of the Order of the British Empire (MBE) ====
Civil Division

- Reginald Cornwall. For services to music.

== Belize ==
=== Order of the British Empire ===
==== Commander of the Order of the British Empire (CBE) ====
Civil Division

- Ramon Edmundo Ramirez. For public service.

==== Officer of the Order of the British Empire (OBE) ====
Civil Division

- Jane Cruz. For services to the Red Cross.

==== Member of the Order of the British Empire (MBE) ====
Civil Division

- Gloria Amanda Edwards. For services to education.
- Margaret Usher. For services to sport.

== Antigua and Barbuda ==
=== Order of the British Empire ===
==== Member of the Order of the British Empire (MBE) ====
Civil Division

- Edith Marjorie Swift, Chief Commissioner of the Girl Guides Association of Antigua and Barbuda.

=== Queen's Police Medal (QPM) ===
- Haynesworth Holme Buckley, Assistant Commissioner of Police.
- Alvin Carcorington Goodwin, CPM, Assistant Commissioner of Police.
- Henry Nicholas Greaux, Superintendent of Police.
- Jeremiah Nathaniel Joseph, Superintendent of Police.

== Gibraltar ==
=== Order of the British Empire ===
==== Knight Grand Cross of the Order of the British Empire (GBE) ====
Civil Division

- Sir Joshua Hassan, KCMG, CBE, LVO, QC, JP, lately Chief Minister of Gibraltar.
