= Grabham =

Grabham is a surname. It may refer to:

- Anthony Grabham (1930–2015), British surgeon
- George Wallington Grabham (1836–1912), New Zealand doctor
- Mick Grabham, guitarist of Procol Harum 1972–1977
- Oxley Grabham (1864–1939), British naturalist, ornithologist, and museum curator
- Tom Grabham (born 1991), Welsh rugby player
