= Donald McCallum (engineer) =

Sir Donald Murdo McCallum CBE FRAeS FREng FRSE FIET (6 August 1922 – 18 October 2011) was a Scottish radar engineer and an important industrialist.

== Early life ==
Don McCallum was born in Edinburgh. His father, Roderick McCallum, was a headmaster who married Lillian McPhee. He attended George Watson's Boys' College. He gained a BSc (1st) in Electrical Engineering from the University of Edinburgh in 1942.

=== Second World War ===
He worked for the Navy on homing beacons on the Implacable-class aircraft carriers HMS Indefatigable (R10) and HMS Implacable (R86). From 1942-46 he worked for the Admiralty Signal Establishment, later known as the Admiralty Research Establishment.

From June 1944 he worked on the short-range VHF radio system for Talk Between Ships (TBS). On the day before D-Day, he had worked on HMS Bulolo, which had directed the landings off Gold Beach.

== Career ==
=== Ferranti ===
He worked for forty years at Ferranti Scotland in Edinburgh, half of those years as general manager from 1968; the company had 8,000 employees. He joined Ferranti in 1947. The company had established itself in Edinburgh during World War II to make gyroscopic gunsights (gyro gunsights).

Projects he oversaw included the Ferranti Laser Target Marker (LTM or FLTM) and the Seaspray radar, and aircraft interception radars.

He was made an FIEE in 1969 and an FEng in 1982. In 1985 he won the British Gold Medal of the Royal Aeronautical Society. He became a Fellow of the Royal Aeronautical Society in 1986.

He retired as general manager in 1985, then as chairman in 1987; six years later Ferranti went bankrupt. Some people believe that had he still been at the company, that bankruptcy may not have happened.

=== Education ===
In the early 1990s he was president of the Scottish Council for Development and Industry. He was chairman of the Scottish Committee of the Universities Funding Council, now the Scottish Funding Council. He also served on the Scottish Tertiary Education Advisory Council.

== Personal life ==
He married Barbara Black in 1949, and they had a daughter in 1950, who died in 2007; his first wife died in 1971. He married again in 1974, and his second wife died in 1997. He married in 2007.

He received a CBE in the 1976 Birthday Honours and a knighthood in the 1988 New Year Honours. He lived in his later life from 2007 at Egton with Newland near Ulverston in South Lakeland. He died aged 89 in Cumbria. He was buried on Wednesday 26 October 2011 in Edinburgh. He had grandchildren and great-grandchildren.

== See also ==
- Peter Hearne, General Manager of GEC Avionics in Kent

Business positions
Preceded by	Chairman of Ferranti Defence Systems; 1984 - 1987	Succeeded by Phil Atterton
