= Henry Bromley (writer) =

English writer

Henry Bromley was the pseudonym of Anthony Wilson (1750?–1814?). He was an English writer on art and author of the Catalogue of Engraved Portraits.

== Biography ==
Anthony Wilson, better known by his pseudonym Henry Bromley, was born at Wigan in 1750. He was perhaps connected with the Wilson family of Kendal, which intermarried with that of Bromley. Wilson belonged to a mercantile firm in the city of London, and was a regular attendant at Hutchins's auction-rooms, where he was detected on one occasion abstracting prints. He also frequented the sale-room of Nathaniel Smith, father of the antiquary, John Thomas Smith (1766–1833). The date of Wilson's death is unknown. His portrait was engraved by Barrett.

== Works ==
In 1793, stimulated by the increased demand for prints consequent on the publication of James Granger's Biographical History of England (1769), Wilson, under the name of Henry Bromley, published A Catalogue of Engraved British Portraits (London, 4to). He received assistance in the compilation from many leading antiquaries and virtuosi, including Sir William Musgrave, James Bindley, and Anthony Morris Storer. In the Catalogue Wilson aimed at furnishing a complete list of engraved British portraits, neglecting only those which could not be identified with their originals. He divided his list into historic periods, and subdivided it into groups according to the rank or calling of the persons portrayed. There is a copy in the British Library. Edward Evans (1789–1835), the print-seller, states that he was a contributor to the Gentleman's Magazine (cf. a letter signed ‘A Gothamite,’ in July 1814).
