= Paul Girolami =

Italian-British businessman (1926–2023)

Sir Paul Girolami FREconS FIMC (25 January 1926 – 17 March 2023) was an Italian-British businessman, who was chairman and chief executive of Glaxo; he made Glaxo into a worldwide success.

== Early life and career ==
Girolami was born in Italy on 25 January 1926. He attended the London School of Economics.

Girolami joined Glaxo in 1965 as a Financial Controller. He became finance director in 1968 when aged 42. In April 1980 it was announced that he would become chief executive. In the early 1980s, Glaxo briefly surpassed British Telecom to become Britain's most valued company on the stock market (LSE), and Glaxo was the world's second-largest pharmaceutical company and remained so into the 1990s; it had been 25th largest in the world in 1980. The reasons for this were a huge increase in its R&D budget, and employing many more researchers; by 1993 it was spending $750 million on research with around 5,500 researchers, of which 3,500 were in the UK. Its other researchers were in Italy, the US and Japan. In April 1985 he was appointed deputy chairman, and it was announced that he would be leaving his post as chief executive in early 1986. On 10 December 1985, he became chairman of Glaxo. He left as chairman in November 1994, when aged 68.

Glaxo merged to become Glaxo Wellcome a year later in 1995. Glaxo drugs that sold well included the Fortum (ceftazidime) and Zinnat (cefuroxime axetil) antibiotics.

== Personal life and death ==
Girolami married in 1952; his wife died in 2009. They had two sons and a daughter. He was knighted in the 1988 New Year Honours, when chairman of Glaxo Holdings.

Girolami died on 15 March 2023, at the age of 97.

== See also ==
- Sir David Jack (scientist) FRS, scientist who discovered Glaxo's worldwide pharmaceuticals
- Ernest Mario, chief executive of Glaxo from 1989 to 1993
- Sir Richard Sykes (biochemist), chief executive of Glaxo from 1993 to 1997 (Glaxo Wellcome from 1995)

Business positions
Preceded by Sir Austin Bide	Chairman of Glaxo Holdings; 1985–1994	Succeeded by
Preceded by Sir Austin Bide	Chief Executive of Glaxo Holdings; 1980–1986	Succeeded by Bernard Taylor
Preceded by	Finance Director of Glaxo Holdings; 1968–1980	Succeeded by
