= Edward Evans (divine) =

English divine

Edward Evans (born 1573), was an English divine.

Evans, son of a clergyman, was born at West Meon, Hampshire, in 1573, and educated at Winchester, whence he matriculated at New College, Oxford, 10 October 1593, and took the two degrees in arts, B.A. 27 November 1598, M.A. 21 January 1602. He had been admitted fellow of his college in 1595, but resigned in 1604. On 23 December 1601 he was instituted by the college to the vicarage of Heckfield, Hampshire, which he resigned in January 1601–2.

Two years later the college presented him to the vicarage of Chesterton, Oxfordshire, 15 November 1604, where he remained until 1610. Evans, who was 'a noted preacher of his time in the university,’ published 'Verba Dierum; or, the Dayes Report of God's glory. … Foure Sermons [on Ps. xix. 2],’ 4to, Oxford, 1615. In that year he does not appear to have been beneficed.

Wood has wrongly ascribed the authorship of these sermons to another Edward Evans, who was born and educated at Llanrwst, Denbighshire, entered Christ Church, Oxford, in 1598 when aged 16, and graduated B.A. 15 February 1603, M.A. 13 March 1606.
