= Ralph Robins =

British businessman (1932–2026)

Sir Ralph Robins
- Born: Ralph Harry Robins; 16 June 1932
- Died: 27 May 2026 (aged 93)
- Education: Imperial College London

Sir Ralph Harry Robins FREng (16 June 1932 – 27 May 2026) was a British businessman who was the CEO of Rolls-Royce. He served 20 years on the board of Rolls-Royce, retiring in 2003 after 10 years as chairman. After retiring from Rolls-Royce, he was appointed a non-executive director of Marshall Group in 2004.

Robins was born on 16 June 1932. He graduated from Imperial College London and joined Rolls-Royce as a graduate apprentice in 1955. During his career he worked on the development of civil aero engines, was executive vice president of the company's American operations, managing director of its Industrial and Marine Division and Commercial Director of the company. Robins was a chairman of the National Defence Industries Council, president of the Society of British Aerospace Companies and a director of several international companies. He was appointed a Fellow of the Royal Academy of Engineering in 1988. Robins was also a deputy lieutenant of Derbyshire and a Freeman of the City of London. He died on 27 May 2026, aged 93.
