= Edwin Evans =

Edwin Evans may refer to:

- Edwin Evans (cricketer) (1849–1921), Australian cricketer
- Edwin Evans (artist) (1860–1946), American painter from Utah
- Edwin Evans (politician) (1855–1928), British politician
- Edwin Evans, (1844–1923), composer and organist, father of Edwin Evans (music critic)
- Edwin Evans (music critic) (1874–1945), English music critic (son of preceding)
