= Anthony Wilson (accountant) =

Sir Anthony Wilson (17 February 1928 – 25 February 2012) was an English accountant and civil servant.

Born on 17 February 1928, Wilson's father ran an engineering company. In 1945, he entered the firm of John Gordon Walton and Co, accountants. He spent two years in the Royal Navy for his National Service. In 1952, he moved to Price Waterhouse and became a manager four years later and a partner in 1961, serving on the policy committee from 1972 to 1984. He was appointed Head of the Government Accountancy Service in 1984, serving until 1988; his appointment reflected the reforms envisaged in the Financial Management Imitative of 1982 and he advocated for increased professionalism in government finance.

After retiring, Wilson served on the Senior Salaries Review Body until 1998 and was master of the Worshipful Company of Needlemakers in 1999. Wilson, who had been knighted in the 1988 New Year Honours, died on 25 February 2012.
