= Anthony Grabham =

British surgeon (1930–2015)

Sir Anthony Herbert Grabham (19 July 1930 – 21 February 2015) was a British surgeon and British Army officer, who was active in medical politics. He was Chairman of the British Medical Association in the late 1970s to early 1980s, and was a member of the General Medical Council for twenty years.

== Early life ==
Grabham was born on 19 July 1930 in Newcastle-Upon-Tyne, England. His father was a police inspector and his grandfather was a firefighter who was head of the fire brigades of North East England.

== Career ==
=== Military service ===
In 1954, Grabham began a period of National Service with the British Army. He was commissioned into the Royal Army Medical Corps as a lieutenant on 25 April 1954. He was promoted to captain on 3 August 1955. On 14 August 1956, he was transferred to the Territorial Army and granted the rank of captain with seniority from 3 August 1955. On 6 June 1957, he was transferred to the Army Emergency Reserve of Officers, thereby ending his military service.

During his military service, he served as a Regimental Medical Officer. He completed two overseas posting: one to Celle, West Germany, and the other to Derna, Libya.

=== Medical career ===
Graham became a general surgeon at the age of 34 years, who also wrote on medico-politics for the British Medical Journal. He qualified from Royal Victoria Infirmary in Newcastle upon Tyne. On returning from Libya as a medical officer, he took up a surgical post in kettering.

== Honours ==
In the 1988 New Year Honours, it was announced that Grabham had been appointed a Knight Bachelor and therefore granted the title sir. On 9 February 1988, he was knighted at Buckingham Palace by Queen Elizabeth II.
