= Edward Evans (printseller) =

Edward Evans (1789–1835) was a printseller and a compositor in the printing office of Nichols & Son, in Red Lion Passage, Fleet Street, London, and was afterward advanced to the post of reader.

He later opened his own print shop and gradually accumulated an extensive stock. He is known for his Catalogue of a Collection of Engraved Portraits, Comprising Nearly 20,000 Portraits of Persons Connected with this Country, undated and published at Great Queen Street, Lincoln's Inn Fields, where he died 24 Nov. 1835, aged 46. His widow, Anne E. Evans, and son, Edward David (1818–1860, brought out a second volume in 1853 at No. 403 Strand, whither the business was moved in that year. The two volumes profess to describe about fifty thousand prints.

Edward David Evans carried on the shop in the Strand until his death there on 15 Aug. 1860, aged 42. He was succeeded by his brother and partner, Albert.
