= David Evans =

David, Dave, or Dai Evans may refer to:

== Academics ==
- Sir David Emrys Evans (1891–1966), Welsh classicist and university principal
- David Evans (microbiologist) (1909–1984), British microbiologist
- David Stanley Evans (1916–2004), British astronomer
- David C. Evans (computer scientist) (1924–1998), American computer graphics pioneer
- David C. Evans (paleontologist) (born 1980), Canadian paleontologist
- David Evans (mathematician) (1940–2026), professor of applied mathematics at University of Bristol
- David A. Evans (1941–2022), organic chemist at Harvard University
- David Andreoff Evans (born 1948), American computational linguist, entrepreneur
- David S. Evans (born 1954), economist and lecturer at University College London and the University of Chicago Law School
- David Evans (geologist) (born 1970), professor of geology and geophysics at Yale University
- David E. Evans (born 1950), professor of mathematics at Cardiff University
- David Evans (musicologist) (born 1944), ethnomusicologist at the University of Memphis
- Dai Morgan Evans (1944–2017), British archaeologist and academic
- David Evans (geneticist), Australian geneticist

== Artists ==
=== Musicians ===
- David Evans (composer) (1874–1948), Welsh composer
- Dave Evans (bluegrass) (1950–2017), American tenor singer and banjo player
- Dave Evans (singer) (born 1953), first lead singer of the rock band AC/DC
- David Howell Evans (born 1961), guitarist of Irish rock band U2, better known as The Edge

=== Other arts ===
- David Evans (writer) (1893–1966), British screenwriter and novelist
- David Allan Evans (born 1940), American poet
- David Mickey Evans (born 1962), American film director and screenwriter
- David Evans (sculptor) (1893–1959), English sculptor
- David Evans (comedian) (1922–1980), English comedian

== Politicians ==
- David Evans (MP for Cardiff) (died 1568), MP for Cardiff
- David R. Evans (South Carolina politician) (1769–1843), U.S. representative from South Carolina
- David Evans (Lord Mayor) (1849–1907), Welsh politician, former Lord Mayor of London
- David Ellicott Evans (1788–1850), U.S. representative from New York, 1827
- David H. Evans (1837–1920), New York politician
- David Evans (Minnesota politician) (1852–1928)
- David Evans (Missouri politician)
- David Arthur Evans (1915–1989), Canadian politician in the Legislative Assembly of Ontario
- David Evans (Western Australian politician) (1924–2019), Australian politician in the Western Australian Legislative Assembly
- David Evans (Victorian politician) (born 1934), Australian politician in the Victorian Legislative Council
- David Evans (MP for Welwyn Hatfield) (1935–2008), British businessman and Conservative politician, MP 1987–1997
- David Evans (West Virginia politician) (born 1945), member of the West Virginia House of Delegates
- David W. Evans (born 1946), U.S. representative from Indiana, 1975–1983
- David Evans Jr. (1848–1929), Wisconsin politician
- David Evans, Baron Evans of Sealand (born 1961), British political official and general secretary of the Labour Party

== Religion ==
- David Evans (canon at St Asaph) (1705–1788), Welsh clergyman and writer
- David Evans (archdeacon of St Asaph) (died 1910), Welsh priest
- David F. Evans (born 1951), American leader in The Church of Jesus Christ of Latter-day Saints
- David Evans (Anglican bishop) (born 1938), British Anglican bishop in Peru
- David Evans (Catholic bishop) (born 1953), English Roman Catholic bishop

== Sportspeople ==
=== Cricket ===
- David Evans (cricketer, born 1869) (1869–1907), 22 first-class matches between 1889 and 1902
- David Evans (Hertfordshire cricketer) (1935–2008), List A cricketer with Hertfordshire
- David Evans (Somerset cricketer, born 1928) (1928–1991), eight first-class matches in 1953
- David Evans (umpire) (1933–1990), cricketer with Glamorgan and Test match umpire

=== Football (soccer) ===
- Dai Evans (footballer, born 1902) (1902–1951), Welsh international footballer
- Dai Evans (footballer, born 1934), Welsh football goalkeeper
- Dave Evans (footballer) (born 1958), English footballer
- David Evans (footballer) (born 1967), former soccer player/footballer with Chester City

=== Rugby ===
- Sir David William Evans (1866–1926), Welsh lawyer, public servant and rugby international
- Dai Evans (1872–1912), Welsh rugby union player
- David Evans (rugby, born 1886) (1886–1940), New Zealand rugby union and rugby league footballer of the 1900s and 1910s
- David Evans (rugby union, born 1899) (1899–1977), Welsh international rugby union player
- David Evans (rugby union, born 1909) (1909–1992), Welsh international rugby union player
- David Morgan Evans (1911–1941), Welsh rugby union and rugby league footballer
- David Wyn Evans (born 1965), Welsh rugby union player
- David Evans (rugby union, born 1988), Welsh rugby union and rugby sevens player

=== Other sports ===
- Dave Evans (racing driver) (1898–1974), American racecar driver
- David Evans (athlete) (born 1967), Australian Paralympian
- David Evans (American football) (born 1959), American football player
- David Evans (squash player) (born 1974), Welsh professional squash player
- David Evans (darts player) (born 1989), English darts player
- Dave Evans (cyclist), Welsh cyclist

== Other people ==
- Dave Evans (entrepreneur), American businessman and academic
- Dave Evans (reporter) (born 1962), American reporter with WABC-TV
- Sir David William Evans (1866–1926), Welsh lawyer, public servant and rugby international
- Sir David Evans (archivist) (1893–1987), Welsh archivist, Keeper of the Public Records
- Sir David Evans (RAF officer) (1924–2020), Air Chief Marshal/Senior Commander in the Royal Air Force (RAF)
- David Evans (RAAF officer) (1925–2020), Senior officer in the Royal Australian Air Force (RAAF)
- David Evans, Baron Evans of Watford (born 1942), British trade unionist and businessman
- David Morier Evans (1819–1874), Welsh financial journalist

== Other uses ==
- David Evans (department store), a department store group based in South Wales
