= Si =

SI is the International System of Units.

SI, Si, or si may also refer to:

== Arts, entertainment, and media ==
=== Literature ===
- Si (novel), a 2014 novel by Bob Ong
- Sí (Peruvian magazine), a magazine notable for its anti-corruption reporting
- Skeptical Inquirer, an American magazine covering topics on science and skepticism
- Sports Illustrated, an American sports magazine
- Soccer International, an Australian monthly magazine

=== Music ===
- Sí (Julieta Venegas album), released in 2003
- Sì (Andrea Bocelli album), released in 2018
- "Sí" (Martin Jensen song), a 2015 song
- Si (musical note), the seventh note in the traditional fixed do solfège
- Sì (operetta), an operetta by the Italian composer Pietro Mascagni
- "Sì" (Gigliola Cinquetti song), the Italian entry to the Eurovision Song Contest 1974
- "Si" (Zaz song), 2013
- Sí, a 2013 Spanish album by Malú
- "Sì", a 1985 song released by Italian actress Carmen Russo

=== Other uses in arts, entertainment, and media ===
- Si (film), original title of the 2010 South Korean film Poetry
- Stark Industries, a fictional company appearing in comic books published by Marvel Comics

== Enterprises and organisations ==
=== Computing ===
- Swiss Informatics Society, a Swiss organization of computer science educators, researchers, and professionals
- The SI, a former name of the American defense contractor Vencore

=== Education ===
- St. Ignatius College Preparatory, a Jesuit high school in San Francisco, California, US
- Silay Institute, a private college in the Philippines

=== Government ===
- Si, a South Korean administrative unit
- Survey of India, an Indian government agency responsible for managing geographical information
- Swedish Institute (Svenska institutet), a Swedish government agency which promotes Sweden abroad

=== Politics ===
- Sarekat Islam, a socio-political organization in Indonesia under Dutch colonial rule
- Catalan Solidarity for Independence, a Catalan political party
- Situationist International, an organization of social revolutionaries
- Socialist International, a worldwide organization of political parties
- Solidarity and Equality, an Argentine political party (Spanish: Solidaridad e Igualdad)

=== Transportation ===
- Blue Islands (IATA airline code, SI)
- Skynet Airlines (IATA airline code SI, ceased operating 2004)
- Spokane International Railroad (reporting mark SI), a former railway in Washington, US

=== Other enterprises and organizations ===
- Samahang Ilokano, a fraternity/sorority based in the Philippines
- SÍ Sørvágur, a Faroese sports association
- Society of Indexers, a professional society based in the UK
- Sports Interactive, a British computer games development company

== People with the name ==
- Si (surname), a Chinese surname
- Si (given name)
- Princess Si of Anding, first daughter of Wu zetain

== Places ==
- Mount Si, a mountain in the U.S. state of Washington
- Si (ancient Seeia/Seia), northern Hauran (ancient Auranitis), Syria; archaeological site with Nabataean temples, necropolis
- Province of Siena (postal code and vehicle registration plate code)
- Si County, Anhui, China
- Si River, in China
- Slovenia's ISO 3166-2 code
- Staten Island (SI), one of the burroughs of New York City
- Sukabumi railway station (SI), a railway station in Sukabumi, Indonesia

== Science and technology ==
=== Biology and healthcare ===
- Smithsonian Institution (SI is its international code)
- Sacroiliac, an anatomical abbreviation for the sacroiliac (joint)
- Self-incompatibility, any genetic mechanism that prevents self-fertilization in hermaphroditic organisms
- Self-injury, intentional, direct injuring
- Sucrase-isomaltase, encoded by the SI gene
- Suicidal ideation, thoughts of suicide
- Shock index, a measurement used to determine if a person is suffering shock

=== Chemistry ===
- si, a chemical descriptor; see prochirality
- Silicon, symbol Si, a chemical element
- Disulfur diiodide, empirical formula SI

=== Computing and Internet ===
- .si, the Internet country code top-level domain for Slovenia
- Shift In, an ASCII control character
- SI register, or source index, in X86 computer architecture
- Superintelligence, a hypothetical artificial intelligence surpassing human intelligence in all forms
- Super Intelligence, the term used by United States federal agencies instead of "artificial intelligence" by the direction of Donald Trump
- Swarm intelligence, an artificial intelligence technique
- Synthetic intelligence, an alternate term for or a form of artificial intelligence

=== Motor vehicles ===
- Honda Civic Si, an automobile
- Spark-ignition engine, a type of internal combustion engine

=== Other uses in science and technology ===
- Signal integrity, electronic circuit tools and techniques that ensure electrical signals are of sufficient quality
- Sine integral, Si(x)
- Spectral interferometry, attosecond physics technique
- Systems integrator, in engineering

== Titles and ranks ==
- Si, a Maghrebi Arabic variant of Sidi, a title of respect
- Si, a variant of the Thai honorific Sri
- Station inspector, a rank in the Singapore Police Force
- Sub-inspector, a rank in Indian police forces

== Other uses ==
- Statutory instrument (UK), abbreviated SI, the principal form in which delegated legislation is made in Great Britain
- Sì (dessert), a Chinese dessert
- Sídhe, Sí, or Sìth, Celtic mythological beings
- si, the Sinhala language ISO 639 alpha-2 code
- Supplemental instruction, an academic support program often used in higher education

== See also ==
- See (disambiguation)
- Sea (disambiguation)
- SL (disambiguation)
- S1 (disambiguation)
