= Sì =

Sì may refer to:

- Sì (dessert), a traditional Chinese dessert
- Sì (operetta), a 1919 operetta in three acts composed by Pietro Mascagni
- Sì (album), by Andrea Bocelli (2018)
- "Sì" (Gigliola Cinquetti song), the Italian entry to the Eurovision Song Contest 1974
- "Sì", a 1985 single by Carmen Russo
- Si (surname) (姒), a Chinese surname

== See also ==
- Si (disambiguation)
- Sí (Julieta Venegas album), a 2003 album by Julieta Venegas
