= Made With Lau =

American YouTube channel about how to cook Cantonese dishes

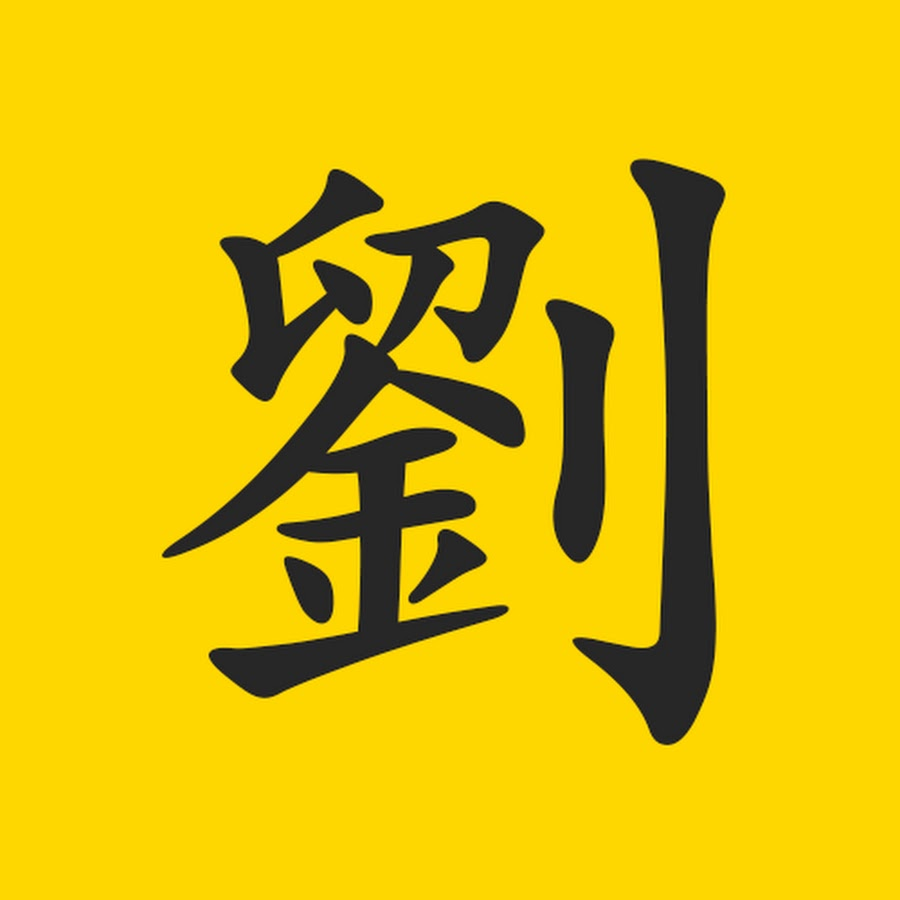
- In the Made With Lau YouTube logo, the Chinese surname Lau (劉) is in black text against a yellow background.

YouTube information
- Channel: Made With Lau
- Years active: 2020–present
- Genre: Cooking
- Subscribers: 1.8 million
- Views: 193 million
- Last updated: April 25, 2026
- Website: www.madewithlau.com

Made With Lau is an American YouTube channel that makes videos about how to cook Cantonese dishes. It features the Cantonese cooking of the Taishan-born Chung Sun Lau (known as Daddy Lau), who had more than 50 years of experience as a chef.

His son, Randy Lau, conceived of the channel after both he and his parents lost their main sources of income during the COVID-19 pandemic. Randy, who grew up in California, had a language barrier with his father, who spoke Cantonese. He viewed the channel as a way to become closer to his father and preserve the Cantonese culture for his children. Released September 1, 2020, Made With Lau's first video was about how to make mapo tofu. Each video generally discusses how to make a dish and its history and ends with three generations of the family eating the dish together. In the videos, Randy's mother, Jenny Lau (known as Mommy Lau), shares about what it was like living in China and answers viewers' questions. Daddy Lau speaks in Cantonese while he cooks, and the videos include Chinese and English subtitles as Randy did not want to dub over his father's voice. In their video about egg foo young, the channel discussed how Chinese people in the United States have been discriminated against.

Beginning after the 2021 Chinese New Year, the channel started receiving millions of views on average every month compared to 100,000 previously. By October 2021, it was making about $50,000 monthly through YouTube ad revenue. In December of that year, it reached half a million subscribers, and in December the following year, it reached one million subscribers. In 2024, Randy Lau received the James Beard Foundation Award for "Emerging Voice in Broadcast", while the Made With Lau channel received the James Beard Foundation Award for "Instructional Visual Media". Made With Lau teaches viewers how to make Cantonese dishes such as egg drop soup, hot and sour soup, tangyuan soup, congee, Chinese steamed eggs, rainbow chicken vegetable stir fry, chow mein, chow fun, ginger egg fried rice, zongzi, Kung Pao chicken, and char siu.

== Background ==
Chung Sun, who is known as Daddy Lau, was born in 1945 in the Guangdong city of Taishan. When he was 12 years old, his parents left him behind, immigrating to Hong Kong with his younger siblings to flee from the Chinese Communist Party. As a descendant of restaurateurs, he took cooking school classes in Guangzhou. In China, he became acquainted with Jenny Lau (known as Mommy Lau), who was born in Guangzhou and would become his wife. Chung Sun immigrated to New York in 1981, and Jenny immigrated in 1982 soon after their marriage. The couple have two children, Jennifer (Jenny) and Randy, who grew up in California.

Chung Sun and Jenny owned Wah Yuen, a Chinese restaurant in Concord, California, that could serve between 60 and 80 customers at a time. Their son, Randy, and his older sister would often eat the restaurant's hot and sour soup and talk to customers. When Randy was around six years old, a fire destroyed the restaurant. To free up time to be with their children, the couple decided to stop operating the restaurant. Jenny returned to being a nurse, her former occupation in Guangzhou, while Chung Sun was employed at several Chinese restaurants as a chef over the years. Chung Sun has been a Chinese food chef for over 50 years. Randy said about his experience as a youth in the San Francisco Bay Area, "I was one of the only Asian kids in school. I didn't feel Asian enough or American enough, I was not fluent in Chinese and I did not feel American as a kid."

== History ==
During the COVID-19 pandemic, Chung Sun and Jenny Lau's restaurant closed. Owing to the COVID-19 shutdowns, Randy Lau lost his business, which had been his primary income stream. The family had to rely on unemployment benefits and savings. At the time, Randy's wife was six months into her pregnancy, and he wanted to assist his parents to make a comeback. During a March 2020 weekend retreat with his wife, Randy conceived the idea of filming his father making Cantonese dishes. He had gone through an activity from the self-help book Designing Your Life that asked, "What would you do if money was not an issue and you would not get judged?" Having previously done work in digital marketing, he decided he wanted to pursue a path of making videos with his parents. In a two-hour conversation, Randy shared his proposal to create YouTube videos with his parents. After he described how YouTube videos could generate revenue for them, his mother was supportive, but he did not know what his father, who remained silent, thought. One day later, his father said in a phone call, "Hey, I defrosted some pork. You want to come and film?" Remaining at home in the San Francisco Bay Area during the pandemic, Randy created the YouTube cooking channel Made with Lau.

Daddy Lau wanted to teach succeeding generations about how to cook Chinese dishes, while Randy wanted to become closer to his father as well as learn more about and preserve his father's culture and recipes so his children could experience them. Randy, whose proficiency in speaking Cantonese is limited to simple chats, found food to be a way to connect to his father. He said, "I've always had a language barrier with my dad. I never really doubted that he loved me because he'd always make this delicious food for me. So that kind of transcended language—food was our love language." The channel's mission statement is to "warm the hearts, homes, and bellies".

For half a year, Randy Lau worked on setting up the channel. He initially planned to name the channel "Chung and Sons Kitchen" since his father's name is Chung Sun, and his father had a son and would soon have a grandson. Despite being very firm on the name, everyone he consulted was against it, so he relented and chose Made With Lau, which he said was a "more inclusive" name. He filmed eight videos with Daddy Lau, ultimately deciding to use five of them since Randy thought three were not good enough. The channel started releasing content on September 1, 2020. It accrued viewers and grew its subscriber base in its beginning months through their friends and family and social media, as well as a callout from the YouTube channel Chinese Cooking Demystified. Between September 2020 and February 2021, the channel released cooking videos on a weekly basis. Starting after the 2021 Chinese New Year, it began receiving millions of views on average every month, compared to 100,000 previously.

The YouTube channel became monetized 2.5 months in on November 15, 2020, the same day Randy turned 33 years old, having received sufficient watch time (4,000 hours) and subscribers (1,000 people). YouTube's first payment to them the following day was for $3.57. In addition to spotlighting the channel as a Creator on the Rise, YouTube profiled it in the podcast The Upload: The Rise of the Creator Economy and the documentary series The United States of YouTube. The Laus also run a blog where they discuss Cantonese cooking.

Made With Lau makes money through over 500 Patreon members and sponsorship agreements from brands. In December 2020, more than 10,000 people were subscribed to the channel. Through Google AdSense, the channel was pulling in a monthly five-figure income by March 2021, and according to YouTube Creators, it was making about $50,000 monthly on YouTube ad revenue by October 2021. Beginning in June 2021, Randy Lau employed people to help him maintain the website and social media, communicate with brands, and connect with the community, as well as research, produce, translate, and edit content. The employees are largely Cantonese speakers, and by June 2022, nine people were working on the business. In December 2021, the channel reached half a million subscribers, and in December 2022, it reached one million subscribers. According to Randy Lau, based on YouTube statistics, 40% of the channel's viewers were from Canada and the United States. Their other viewers were from Australia, Indonesia, Malaysia, the Philippines, the United Kingdom, and Singapore. The James Beard Foundation in 2024 gave Randy Lau the "Emerging Voice in Broadcast" award and the Made in Lau channel the "Instructional Visual Media" award.

== Content ==
Made with Lau features Cantonese dishes frequently served at Chinese restaurants as well as dishes that are routinely cooked at home. The channel's inaugural video, released on September 1, 2020, was about how to make mapo tofu. Titled "Dad's EASY Mapo Tofu Recipe, Cantonese style (麻婆豆腐鸡)!", it discussed the dish's history and every phase of making the dish, and included a segment for answering viewers' questions. Published each Tuesday, videos typically begin with a beaming Daddy Lau explaining in Cantonese what dish he is going to make and sometimes making a thumbs up sign. Daddy Lau shares his cooking tips in the videos such as the best way to sharpen a knife and his technique to extract as much taste as possible from dried scallops. Daddy Lau also plays the flute, and his music appears in the channel's videos as its theme music.

Daddy Lau speaks Cantonese in the videos. To keep his father's voice and disposition, Randy Lau decided against dubbing his father's conversation. He instead added Chinese and English subtitles to the videos, largely so that Daddy Lau would be able to understand everything. Randy Lau estimated that it takes between 10 and 20 hours to add subtitles to a video. While Randy did the English subtitles, a cousin helped with adding the Chinese subtitles.

Videos show three generations of the family eating meals together: Daddy and Mommy Lau, Randy and Kat Lau, and their two children. Depending on the subject matter and conversants, they do code-switching between Cantonese and English during mealtime conversations. CNN's Julia M. Chan said the family meal was "a big draw for many fans who see themselves in the Laus". The South China Morning Post's Mabel Lui agreed, writing, "After all, while people may return to the channel because of the recipes, the endearing nature of the relationship between [Randy] Lau and his father (as well the rest of their family) is equally compelling." Jenny and Daddy Lau discuss their experiences living in China. Jenny Lau shared a story about the hot and sour soup dish. Shortly after she immigrated to the United States, it was freezing and snowing in New York, and she was with a friend. They visited a Chinese restaurant where she asked for hot and sour soup, making it the first restaurant dish she got in the United States. The family's videos showcase many major events in their history such as the birth of Randy Lau's son, Cameron; Randy's sister Jennifer's engagement; and Daddy Lau's 75th birthday. In Mochi, Sabrina Wong said, "In some of these intimate moments, you forget the video is filmed — everything about the switching of languages, huge platters of food, and big family table feels so right." Randy posts YouTube Shorts, where he poses questions to his parents such as, "Mom, what brings you joy?" or "What was hard about immigrating to America?"

CNN's Julia M. Chan said, "Using food as a gateway, Made With Lau subtly challenges Western stereotypes of Asians as cold or reserved, showing instead warmth and generosity." In a video about how to make egg foo young, the channel discussed how Chinese people in the United States have been discriminated against. When discussing the cooking of General Tso's chicken, Randy opined that the contention that the dish was not "authentic" was not the most germane. He shared that at the beginning of the 1900s while facing anti-Chinese discrimination, Chinese immigrants were able to survive by making the dish. Other recipes featured on the channel include egg drop soup, hot and sour soup, tangyuan soup, congee, Chinese steamed eggs, rainbow chicken vegetable stir fry, chow mein, chow fun, ginger egg fried rice, zongzi, Kung Pao chicken, and char siu. (Note: For egg drop soup; For hot and sour soup; For tangyuan soup; For congee; For Chinese steamed eggs; For rainbow chicken vegetable stir fry; For chow mein; For chow fun; For ginger egg fried rice; For zongzi; For Kung Pao chicken; For char siu)

== Family members ==
- Chung Sun Lau (simplified Chinese: 刘松新; traditional Chinese: 劉松新), known as Daddy Lau, was born in 1945 in the Chinese city Taishan in Guangdong. In 1981, he immigrated to New York. He is married to Jenny Lau with whom he has two children, Jennifer and Randy.
- Jenny Lau (simplified Chinese: 陈惠珍; traditional Chinese: 陳惠珍), known as Mommy Lau, was born in Guangzhou, where she grew up. She immigrated to the United States in 1981 soon following her marriage to Daddy Lau. Initially she took on work as a dressmaker before she became co-ran a restaurant with Daddy Lau. She worked for several decades as a nursing assistant. In the videos, she discusses what it was like living in China. Lau assists in responding to questions from the channel's audience.
- Jennifer Lau (simplified Chinese: 刘明仪; traditional Chinese: 劉明儀) was born in New York and grew up in California. She works in enterprise sales. Jenny Lau, who is present in a number of the videos, worked on creating branded cooking products like woks.
- Randy Lau (simplified Chinese: 刘铭健; traditional Chinese: 劉銘健; born November 15, 1987) attended the University of California, Los Angeles, where he studied electrical engineering and mechanical engineering. He had experience in digital marketing before starting the YouTube channel. He is married to Kat, with whom he has two children Cameron (nicknamed "Cam Cam") and Maya, who was born in March 2022.
- Kathlyn Hart Lau was raised in Richmond, California. She is half-Chinese, and her father is a software engineer. As an undergraduate student at the University of California, Los Angeles, between 2006 and 2010 she studied international development with a concentration on the Middle East and developing areas in Asia. After graduation, she worked at a non-profit organization where she coached young people whose parents were imprisoned, served as a waitress, and did an internship at an architectural design company. After a six-month stint traveling, she became a freelancer in web design and marketing. She is married to Randy Lau whom she met when they both volunteered at UCLA UniCamp, a summer camp for children. She contributes analysis in the videos and reads questions from viewers.
