= Santosh Bhartiya (author) =

Indian journalist, author, and politician

Member of Parliament, Lok Sabha
- In office 1989–1991
- Preceded by: Khurshed Alam Khan
- Succeeded by: Salman Khurshid
- Constituency: Farrukhabad

Personal details
- Born: 26 March 1950 (age 76) Ganeshpur, Farrukhabad district, Uttar Pradesh, India
- Citizenship: Indian
- Party: Janata Dal
- Parent: Bhairav Singh Rathore (father)
- Occupation: Journalist, author, film producer, politician

Santosh Bhartiya (born 26 March 1950) is an Indian journalist, author, film producer, and former politician. He served as a member of parliament in the 9th Lok Sabha (1989–1991), representing the Farrukhabad constituency on a Janata Dal ticket. He is the founding editor-in-chief of the Hindi weekly newspaper Chauthi Duniya and the author of several books on Indian politics and journalism, including the memoir V.P. Singh, Chandrashekhar, Sonia Gandhi Aur Main (2021).

== Early life and activism ==
Santosh Bhartiya was born on 26 March 1950 in Ganeshpur in the Farrukhabad district of Uttar Pradesh to Bhairav Singh Rathore.

As a student in the early 1970s, he participated in the Bihar Movement led by Jayaprakash Narayan and was associated with student organisations such as the Tarun Shanti Sena and the Chhatra Yuva Sangharsh Vahini. On 17 March 1975, prior to the formal proclamation of the Emergency, he was detained in Gujarat under the Maintenance of Internal Security Act (MISA). Following Jayaprakash Narayan's advice to pursue journalism alongside public life, Bhartiya entered the media field in the late 1970s.

== Journalism career ==
=== Print and television ===
Bhartiya began his journalism career in the late 1970s as a correspondent with the Hindi news magazine Ravivar, published by the ABP Group, eventually rising to the rank of Special Correspondent. During his tenure at Ravivar, he reported on state politics, agrarian issues, and banditry in the dacoit-affected regions of Uttar Pradesh and Madhya Pradesh. In the mid-1980s, he joined the group's English-language daily, The Telegraph, as a Special Correspondent covering national politics and the Bofors scandal.

Alongside print journalism, Bhartiya worked in early Indian television current-affairs programming. He served as a principal correspondent for Newsline on Doordarshan, a programme anchored by M. J. Akbar and produced by Vinod Dua. Later, he was involved in the launch of Jain TV, one of India's early private satellite television networks. In 2005, he was appointed CEO and editor-in-chief for the launch of the 24-hour Hindi news channel S1, backed by the Senior Media Group.

=== Chauthi Duniya ===
In 1986, Bhartiya co-founded Chauthi Duniya alongside industrialist and politician Kamal Morarka, who served as its proprietor. Positioned as a Hindi weekly focused on investigative journalism and political commentary, the publication covered issues surrounding the Bofors controversy and the rise of opposition politics in North India. After a hiatus, Bhartiya relaunched Chauthi Duniya in 2008 as its editor-in-chief and later expanded the brand into English and Urdu editions, as well as a digital platform hosting his political interview series, Untold Stories – Rajniti Ke Qisse.

=== 2016 Kashmir open letter ===
In October 2016, following a four-day visit to the Kashmir Valley with fellow journalists, Bhartiya published an open letter to Prime Minister Narendra Modi in the Srinagar-based newspaper Rising Kashmir. In the letter, which was widely cited in Indian and international media, he wrote that while the territory was with India, the administration was losing the trust of the local populace.

== Political career ==
During the 1989 Indian general election, Bhartiya contested the Farrukhabad Lok Sabha constituency in Uttar Pradesh as a candidate of the Janata Dal. Riding the anti-corruption wave led by V. P. Singh, Bhartiya defeated the incumbent Indian National Congress candidate Salman Khurshid to enter the 9th Lok Sabha.

During his parliamentary term (1989–1991), he served as a member of the Press Council of India and various parliamentary consultative committees. Following the dissolution of the 9th Lok Sabha in 1991, he did not contest subsequent elections and returned full-time to journalism.

=== Electoral history ===
Year	Election	Constituency	Party	Result
1989	9th Lok Sabha	Farrukhabad, Uttar Pradesh	Janata Dal	Won

== Pegasus spyware surveillance ==
- 2019 WhatsApp surveillance episode: Following WhatsApp's October 2019 lawsuit against NSO Group, Bhartiya was identified among several Indian journalists and public figures whose devices were allegedly targeted via a WhatsApp vulnerability. Bhartiya confirmed to Scroll.in that he had received an alert from WhatsApp regarding a potential breach and had previously been contacted by Citizen Lab.
- 2021 Pegasus Project leak: In July 2021, an international media consortium investigation (the Pegasus Project) listed Bhartiya among over 40 Indian journalists and activists whose phone numbers appeared in a leaked database of potential surveillance targets.

== Authorship and film production ==
=== Books ===
- Patrakarita: Naye Daur, Naye Pratiman (2005), Rajkamal Prakashan, ISBN 978-81-7119-986-0
- Nishane Par: Samay, Samaj Aur Rajniti (2005), Radhakrishna Prakashan, ISBN 978-81-7119-987-7
- Dalit and Minority Empowerment (2008), Rajkamal Prakashan, ISBN 978-81-267-1599-2
- V.P. Singh, Chandrashekhar, Sonia Gandhi Aur Main (2021), Warrior's Victory Publishing House, ISBN 978-81-951039-5-9

His 2021 political memoir, V.P. Singh, Chandrashekhar, Sonia Gandhi Aur Main, chronicles his interactions with former Prime Ministers V. P. Singh and Chandra Shekhar, as well as Congress leaders Sonia Gandhi and Ahmed Patel. Upon its release, the book received media attention for its accounts of back-channel political negotiations prior to the 2004 Indian general election and the fallout between the Gandhi and Bachchan families in the 1990s.

=== Filmography ===
- Hogaya Dimaagh Ka Dahi (2015) – Co-producer and screenplay writer
- Bhaiaji Superhit (2018) – Co-producer

Lok Sabha
Preceded by Khurshed Alam Khan	Member of Parliament for Farrukhabad; 1989–1991	Succeeded by Salman Khurshid
