= Tang bu shuai =

Cantonese rice flour ball dessert

Tong but lut
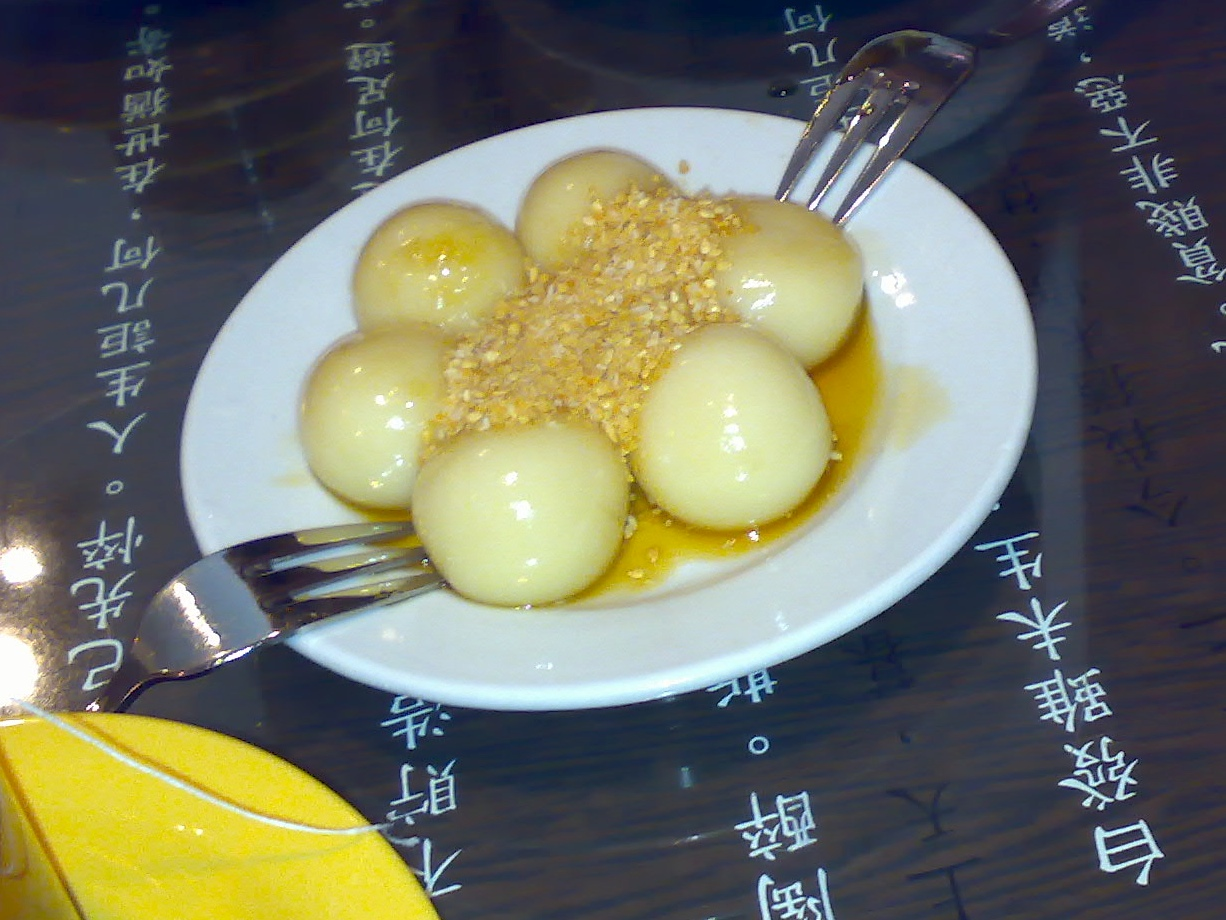
- Course: dessert
- Place of origin: Guangdong, China
- Region or state: Guangdong province, China, Hong Kong
- Main ingredients: glutinous rice flour, sugar, ground peanuts

Tang bu shuai
- Traditional Chinese: 糖不甩
- Simplified Chinese: 糖不甩
- Hanyu Pinyin: Táng bù shuǎi
- Jyutping: tong4bat1lat1
- Literal meaning: sweet not fall off
Transcriptions
Standard Mandarin
- Hanyu Pinyin: Táng bù shuǎi
Yue: Cantonese
- Jyutping: tong4bat1lat1

Tong but lut (Chinese: 糖不甩; Jyutping: tong4 bat1 lat1; lit. 'sweet not fall off') is a Cantonese dessert. Glutinous rice flour balls in sugar syrup are sprinkled with crushed roasted peanuts (and/or roasted sesame seeds and desiccated coconut). The stickiness of the balls prevents the topping from coming off, hence the name.

The dish played a role in traditional Cantonese betrothals. A man seeking a wife would visit her parents and if the woman's family agreed to his suit, he would be served tong but lut, to suggest that the couple's married life would be sweet (糖) and they would stick together (不甩). If his request was refused, he would be served a sweet soup (雞蛋腐竹糖水) containing scrambled eggs (散雞蛋) and dried tofu skin to suggest that the couple would fall apart (散 meaning both 'scramble' and 'break up'). This form of politeness helped the suitor maintain face.

== See also ==
- Sì (dessert)
- Tangyuan (food)
- Rice cake
