= 1S =

1S or 1s may refer to:

- 1s electron, in an atomic orbital
- Sabre (computer system)'s IATA code
- 1S, a series of Toyota S engines
- SSH 1S (WA); see Washington State Route 502, Washington State Route 503
- One shilling (British coin)

== See also ==
- Shilling
- Second
- Ones (disambiguation)
- S1 (disambiguation)
