= Si (given name) =

Si is a given name, which is often a nickname or a short version of Simon, Silas, or other names. It may refer to the following notable people:

- Si Begg (born 1972), English electronic dance music DJ, musician and record producer
- Si Bell (1894–1972), American college football player
- Si Kaddour Benghabrit (1868–1954), Algerian religious leader, translator and interpreter
- Si Burick (1909–1986), American sports journalist
- Si Cranstoun (born 1971), British singer
- Si Frumkin (1930–2009), Lithuanian-born Jew, Holocaust survivor, textile manufacturer and activist in the United States
- Si Garrett (1913–1967), American politician and attorney
- Si Genaro (born 1971), British musician
- Si Gerson (1909–2004), American communist politician and journalist
- Si Green (1933–1980), American basketball player
- Si Griffis (1883–1950), Canadian ice hockey player
- Si Hayden, British musician and composer
- Si Jenks (1876–1970), American actor
- Si Johnson (1906–1994), American baseball player
- Si Kahn (born 1944), American singer-songwriter and activist
- Si King (born 1966), English television presenter
- Si Lewen (1918–2016), Polish-American painter and soldier
- Si Mohand (c. 1848–1905), Berber poet from Kabylie, Algeria
- Si Mustapha-Müller (1926–1993), German-Algerian revolutionary
- Si Phili (born 1974), British rapper
- Si Phyo (born 1990), Burmese actor
- Si Pitung, 19th century bandit in Indonesia
- Si Robertson (born 1948), American television personality
- Si Schroeder (born Simon Kenny), Irish music artist
- Si Siman (born Ely E. Siman Jr.; 1921–1994), American country music executive
- Si Spencer (1961–2021), British comic book writer and TV dramatist and editor
- Si Stebbins, namesake of the Si Stebbins stack in cards
- Si Yew Ming (born 1979), Malaysian tennis player
- Si Zentner (1917–2000), American jazz trombonist and big-band leader

== See also ==
- Si On, South Korean painter
- Si Yi Chen, Australian criminal
- Sy
