= Yuanxiao =

Glutinous rice dish shaken from fillings

Yuanxiao (Chinese: 元宵; pinyin: yuánxiāo; Wade–Giles: Yuan^{2}hsiao^{1}; lit. 'first night') are dumplings of glutinous rice flour, filled with sesame or peanut powder and sugar, or sweet red bean paste, eaten in a soup during the Lantern Festival, the fifteenth day of the Chinese New Year. They are similar to tangyuan, but are traditionally prepared in a basket, and served mainly in Northern China.

Yuanxiao have sweet and solid fillings and are served in a thick broth. The surface tends to be dry and soft, and they have a short shelf life. The process of making the dish begins with preparing the solid fillings that are then cut into small pieces. The filling is dipped into water then the dry glutinous rice flour repeatedly, until a round shape is achieved.

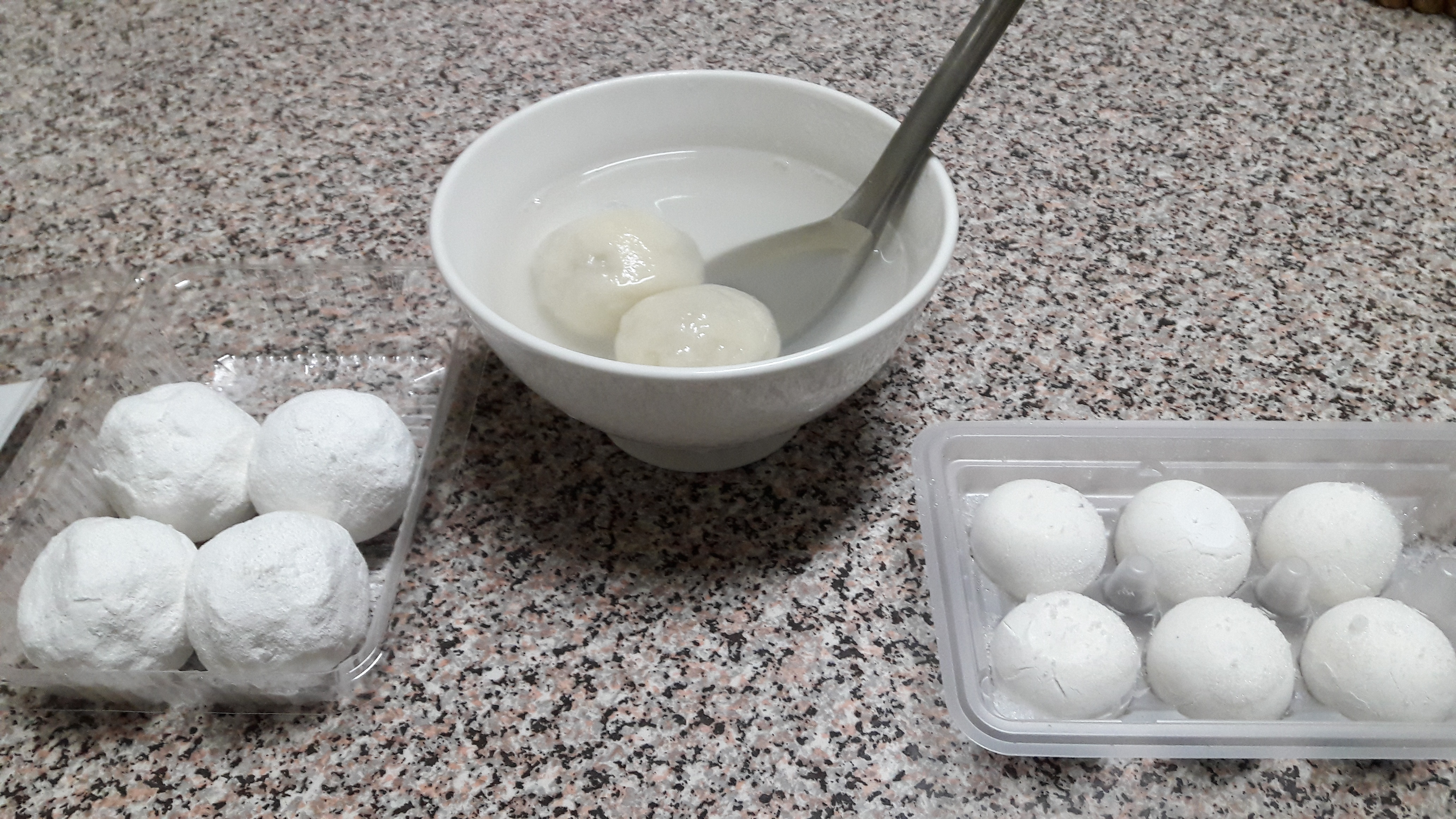
Yuanxiao (left, middle) and tangyuan (right)

== See also ==
- Lantern Festival traditions
