= Si Mustapha-Müller =

German-Algerian revolutionary, journalist, interpreter, conservationist and filmmaker

- Born: Winfried Müller; 19 November 1926; Wiesbaden, Weimar Republic
- Died: 9 October 1993 (aged 66); Tamanrasset, Algeria
- Resting place: Tassili n'Ajjer, Algeria
- Education: Parteihochschule Karl Marx
- Political party: Independent Workers' Party of Germany (1951-1952); Socialist Unity Party of Germany (1948-1951)
- Spouse: Sonja Klare

Si Mustapha-Müller (born "Winfried Müller"; 19 November 1926 – 9 October 1993) was a German-Algerian revolutionary who supported the National Liberation Front in the Algerian War. At various points in his life, he also worked as a journalist, interpreter, nature conservationist, and filmmaker.

== Life ==
Mustapha-Müller was born Winfried Müller on 19 November 1926 in Wiesbaden. He attended school in Oberstdorf and worked as a laborer after graduation. In 1941 he moved to the village of Götzens. In May 1943 Mustapha-Müller was arrested and tortured by the Gestapo in Innsbruck. The Gestapo transferred him to the Reich Labor Service; he was later transferred to the Kriegsmarine. By January 1944, Mustapha-Müller was a naval artilleryman on the Baltic Sea, but was soon hospitalized in Kiel. He was then transferred to a penal battalion near Toruń in Poland. While serving with the penal battalion, Mustapha-Müller was arrested for desertion. During his transfer to a court-martial, he was able to escape near Danzig and made his way to a Red Army bridgehead. After lengthy interrogations, he met Willi Bredel, and served as a representative of the National Committee for Free Germany. Mustapha-Müller then worked as a frontline helper for the committee and returned to Germany with the advancing Red Army.

After the conclusion of the Second World War, Mustapha-Müller was sent to a Red Army training school. He then worked in Ukraine and Belarus looking after and repatriating Austrian prisoners of war. Afterwards Mustapha-Müller moved to Vienna, working briefly in the editorial department of an Austrian-Soviet magazine. He then returned to Tyrol, the region where he had lived between 1941 and 1943. He was not well received by locals due to efforts to expose former Nazis living in the region. Mustapha-Müller then moved to Kleinmachnow in 1947 in the Soviet occupation zone of Germany. In January 1948, he joined the Socialist Unity Party of Germany (SED), and completed a course in social sciences at the Parteihochschule Karl Marx. After this, Mustapha-Müller worked for the SED in Wiesbaden, but ran afoul of party officials, being accused of being a Titoist. On 9 January 1951 he was expelled from the SED.

In March 1951, Mustapha-Müller joined the Independent Workers' Party of Germany in Worms. In Worms, he met Sonja Klare. They married on 12 January 1952 and had a son. In 1953, Mustapha-Müller left the German Democratic Republic for Yugoslavia to avoid prosecution for forgery.

In 1954, Mustapha-Müller traveled to Paris, where he became a sympathizer of the Algerian National Liberation Front (FLN). He then began to assist the FLN with their underground activities in Metropolitan France. His involvement with the FLN was discovered by French authorities and he was ordered to leave the country before the end of 1956. In order to continue his work with the FLN, he left for Morocco in the fall of 1956. After his arrival in Morocco, Mustapha-Müller initially had difficulty finding a place in the FLN. While working as an interpreter during the interrogation of deserted Foreign Legionnaires, he devised the idea of using psychological warfare against soldiers of the French Foreign Legion. The inspiration for this plan was Mustapha-Müller's work with the National Committee for a Free Germany during the Second World War, in which they used psychological warfare against Wehrmacht soldiers. In October 1956, the FLN decided to create an official repatriation service known as the Service de Rapatriement des Legionnaires Étrangères. The organization would convince Foreign Legionnaires to desert, then repatriate then to their home countries. Mustapha-Müller became its director; and was joined by another German, Mourad Kusserow, in 1959. The organization's headquarters were located in a villa in Tétouan, Morocco. The repatriation project was a great success, assisting in the desertion of 4,111 legionnaires over its six years of operation. These included over 2,700 soldiers from Germany, over 400 from both Spain and Italy and over 100 from Hungary. The organization relied on a strong network of FLN sympathizers, particularly in German-speaking countries. While working for the repatriation service, Mustapha-Müller survived many attacks on him by the French secret service. These included an assassination attempt in Meknes in 1957, a letter bomb attack in March 1960; and being fired at with a submachine gun in Frankfurt.

After the conclusion of the Algerian War, and the independence of Algeria in 1962, Mustapha-Müller was employed by the Algerian government. He found work for Algerian Ministry of Youth, Sports and Tourism, headed by his acquaintance Abdelaziz Bouteflika, promoting tourism to Algeria from Germany. In August 1963, Mustapha-Müller fell ill and travelled to Madrid for treatment. In July 1964 he was granted Algerian citizenship and received a job at the Ministry of Information. He worked there for ten years and was responsible for the overseeing German-language press in the country. After concluding his work for the Ministry of Information, Mustapha-Müller moved to Tikjda, a ski resort town. He helped found the Algerian Ski Association and was involved in a serious skiing accident around this time.

In 1978 he oversaw the founding of Djurdjura National Park in Kabylia. After his time in Djudjura National Park, Mustapha-Müller was inspector general of all Algerian national parks from 1983 to 1986. His last official position was as director of another national park, Tassilin National Park, from 1986 to 1988. He then produced a few nature documentary films together with the National Forestry Institute. At the beginning of the 1990s, after an examination by a Viennese heart specialist, he returned to Algeria and continued filming a documentary about the Hoggar Mountains. He died of a heart attack on 9 October 1993 in Tamanrasset. Mustapha-Müller was buried in Tassilin National Park.
