= S1 =

S1, S01, S.I, S-1, S.1, Š-1 or S 1 may refer to:

== Biology and chemistry ==
- S1 nuclease, an enzyme that digests singled-stranded DNA and RNA
- S1: Keep locked up, a safety phrase in chemistry
- Primary somatosensory cortex, also known as S1
- Tegafur/gimeracil/oteracil, also known as S-1, a chemotherapy medication

== Entertainment ==
- S1 (Indian TV channel), a Hindi-language channel
- S1 (Swiss TV channel), a German-language channel
- S1 (producer), a hip hop producer, member of the group Strange Fruit Project
- S1 No. 1 Style, a Japanese adult video company
- Gibson S-1, a guitar made by the Gibson Guitar Corporation
- A member of the S1W (group) that later became part of the music group Public Enemy

== Government ==
- Bill S-1, a pro forma bill in Canadian Parliament
- Form S-1, a U.S. Securities and Exchange Commission filing
- S-1 Executive Committee, a US government entity during World War II
- S1 (military), an administrative position within military units

== Technology ==
- ACPI S1 power state, in computing; see Advanced Configuration and Power Interface § Global states
- Apple S1, integrated computer used in the Apple Watch
- Canon PowerShot S1 IS, a 2004 3.2 megapixel digital camera
- FinePix S1 Pro, a 2000 interchangeable lens digital single-lens reflex camera by Fujifilm
- Nikon Coolpix S1, a digital camera
- Nikon 1 S1, mirrorless interchangeable lens camera
- S1 Corporation, an American software development company
- S1 Core, a microprocessor-core
- S1 MP3 Player
- Samsung Galaxy S (2010 smartphone)
- Sendo S1, a Sendo mobile phone model
- Siemens S1, a Siemens mobile phone
- Sony BDP-S1, a first generation Blu-ray Disc (BD) Player
- S1, an EPC in an LTE/4G network

== Transportation ==
=== Routes ===
==== Austria ====
- S1 (Vienna), an S-Bahn line
- S1, a line of the Carinthia S-Bahn
- S1, a line of the Salzburg S-Bahn
- S1, a line of the Styria S-Bahn
- S1, a line of the Tyrol S-Bahn
- S1, a line of the Upper Austria S-Bahn
- S1, a line of the Vorarlberg S-Bahn

==== China ====
- Line S1 (Beijing Subway)
- Line S1 (Guiyang Metro)
- Line S1 (Hefei Metro)
- Line S1 (Nanjing Metro)
- Line S1 (Taizhou Rail Transit)
- Line S1 (Wenzhou Rail Transit)
- Line S1 (Wuxi Metro)
- S1 Yingbin Expressway in Shanghai

==== Germany ====
- S1 (Berlin), an S-Bahn line
- S1 (Dresden), an S-Bahn line
- S1 (Munich), an S-Bahn line
- S1 (Nuremberg), an S-Bahn line
- S1 (Rhine-Main S-Bahn), an S-Bahn line
- S1 (Rhine-Ruhr S-Bahn), an S-Bahn line
- S1 (Stuttgart), an S-Bahn line
- S1, a Breisgau S-Bahn line
- S1, a planned Bremen S-Bahn line
- S1, a Hamburg S-Bahn line
- S1, a Hanover S-Bahn line
- S1, a RheinNeckar S-Bahn line
- S1, a Rostock S-Bahn line
- S1, a Stadtbahn Karlsruhe line

==== Italy ====
- S1a, a Bologna metropolitan railway service
- S1b, a Bologna metropolitan railway service
- Line S1 (Milan suburban railway service)

==== Switzerland ====
- S1 (Bern S-Bahn), an S-Bahn line in the canton of Bern
- S1 (RER Vaud), an S-Bahn line in the canton of Vaud
- S1 (St. Gallen S-Bahn), an S-Bahn line in the cantons of Schaffhausen, St. Gallen, Thurgau and Zurich
- S1 (ZVV), now subsumed by S24, a Zurich S-Bahn line
- S1, a line of the Basel S-Bahn
- S1, a line of the Chur S-Bahn
- S1, a line of the Lucerne S-Bahn
- S1, a line of the Zug Stadtbahn

==== United States ====
- County Route S1 (California)
- S1 (Long Island bus)

==== Other countries ====
- S-1 Strategic Highway, Pakistan
- Expressway S1 (Poland)
- FGC line S1, a suburban train line in Barcelona Province
- Stagecoach Gold bus route S1, in Oxfordshire, England, UK

=== Vehicles ===
==== Aircraft ====
- Blackburn Buccaneer S.1 jet naval strike aircraft
- Focke-Wulf S 1, a German Focke-Wulf aircraft
- Fokker S.I, a 1919 Dutch primary trainer aircraft
- Hopfner S-1, a Hopfner aircraft
- Letov S-1, a 1920 Czechoslovak surveillance aircraft
- Loening S-1, a US Army Air Service seaplane
- Loughead S-1 Sport 1920 US biplane
- Martinsyde S.1, a 1914 British biplane aircraft
- Pantsir-S1, a Russian anti-aircraft system
- Pitts S-1 aerobatic biplane
- S-1 Loening, a US Army Air Service seaplane
- SSBS S1, a French experimental rocket
- Swift S-1, a 1991 Polish single seat aerobatic glider

==== Cars ====
- AS S1, a 1927 car manufactured in Poland
- Audi S1, performance variant of Audi A1
- Invicta S1, a 2004 sports car
- Leapmotor S01, an all-electric car
- S1 Scout Car, an armoured car built in Australia during the Second World War
- Superformance S1 Roadster, a Lotus Seven Type replicar produced in South Africa 2001–2004
- Saleen S1, an American sports car

==== Other vehicles ====
- Alco S-1, a locomotive
- PRR S1, a duplex locomotive developed by the Pennsylvania Railroad
- LNER Class S1, a class of British steam locomotives
- NER Class S1, a class of British steam locomotives
- USS S-1 (SS-105), a 1918 US Navy experimental submarine

== Other uses ==
- S1 (classification), a disability swimming classification
- S postcode area covering Sheffield City Centre
- in human anatomy:
  - The first sacral vertebra
  - The sacral spinal nerve 1 of the vertebral column
  - The primary somatosensory cortex in the brain
- Senior 1, the First Year in the Scottish secondary education system
- Season (television) or series one
- Comet Ikeya–Seki, C/1965 S1
- Upplands regemente (signal), a 1902 Signal Regiment of the Swedish Armed Forces

== With superscripts and subscripts ==
S_{1} may refer to:

- S1 (heart sound), a heart sound in cardiac auscultation

S^{1} may refer to:

- S^{1}, the n-sphere in two dimensions i.e. a circle
- Inverse second (s^{−1}), a unit of frequency

== S01 ==
S01 may refer to:

- Akai S01, an Akai synthesizer
- ATC code S01 Ophthalmologicals, a subgroup of the Anatomical Therapeutic Chemical Classification System
- HMS Porpoise (S01), a 1956 Porpoise-class submarine of the Royal Navy
- MULTI-S01, an encryption algorithm based on a pseudorandom number generator

== See also ==
- 1S (disambiguation)
