= Birgitz =

- Municipality
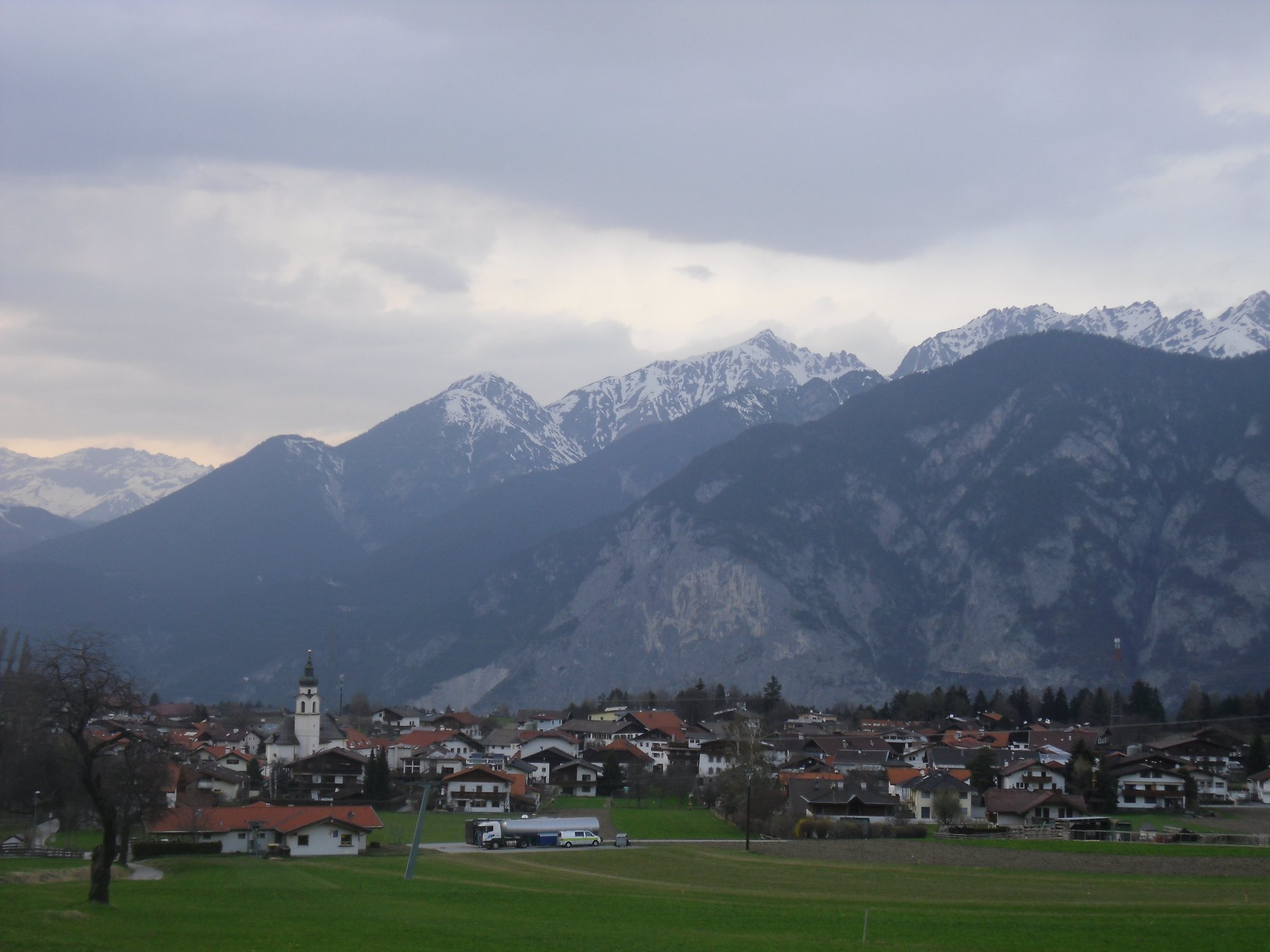
- View of Birgitz

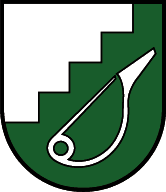
- Coat of arms

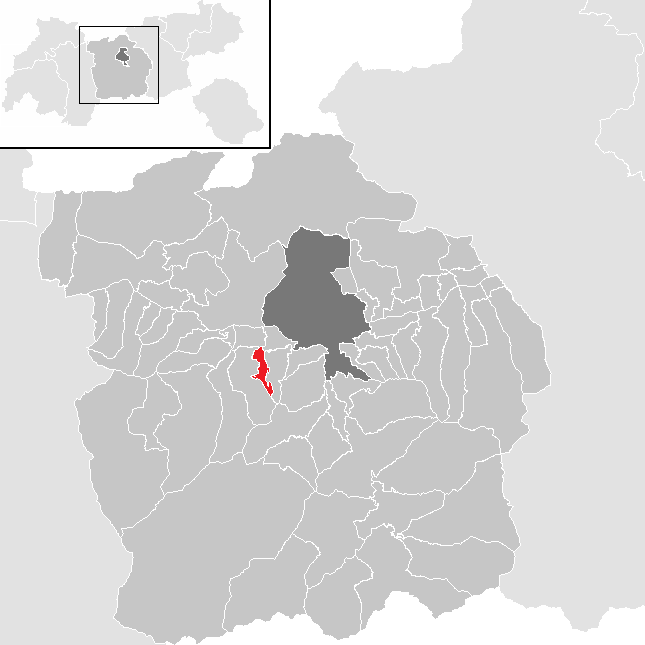
- Location in the district

- Location within Austria
- Coordinates: 47°14′03″N 11°18′03″E
- Country: Austria
- State: Tyrol
- District: Innsbruck Land

Government
  - Mayor: Markus Haid

Area
  - Total: 4.78 km^{2} (1.85 sq mi)
- Elevation: 859 m (2,818 ft)

Population (2021)
  - Total: 1,496
  - Density: 313/km^{2} (811/sq mi)
- Time zone: UTC+1 (CET)
  - Summer (DST): UTC+2 (CEST)
- Postal code: 6092
- Area code: 05234
- Vehicle registration: IL

Birgitz is a community in the district of Innsbruck in Tyrol and lies on a terrace of the highlands 10 km south west of the capital. The nearest neighbouring village is Axams in the west and Götzens in the east.

Already around 100 BC the name Birga was known in the area. Due to a high increase in population Birgitz will eventually merge with Götzens some time.

== Population ==
Historical population
Year	Pop.	±%
1869	314	—
1880	342	+8.9%
1890	303	−11.4%
1900	284	−6.3%
1910	259	−8.8%
1923	276	+6.6%
1934	311	+12.7%
1939	287	−7.7%
1951	361	+25.8%
1961	409	+13.3%
1971	574	+40.3%
1981	824	+43.6%
1991	1,073	+30.2%
2001	1,212	+13.0%
2011	1,306	+7.8%
2015	1,342	+2.8%
