= Ernest Evans (cricketer) =

English cricketer

Personal information
- Full name: Ernest Dering Evans
- Born: 21 August 1861; Clifton, Bristol, England
- Died: 4 November 1948 (aged 87); Clifton, Bristol, England

Domestic team information
- Years: Team
- 1891: Somerset

Career statistics
Competition	FC
Matches	1
Runs scored	0
Batting average	0.00
100s/50s	0/0
Top score	0
Catches/stumpings	1/–
- Source: CricketArchive (subscription required), 22 December 2015

Ernest Evans (21 August 1861 – 4 November 1948) was an English cricketer who played for Somerset. He was born and died in Clifton, Bristol.

Evans made one first-class appearance for Somerset, during the 1891 season, against Gloucestershire. In the single innings in which he batted, he was bowled by Frederick Roberts for a duck.

Evans' brother, David played for Gloucestershire and Somerset.
