= Götzens =

- Municipality
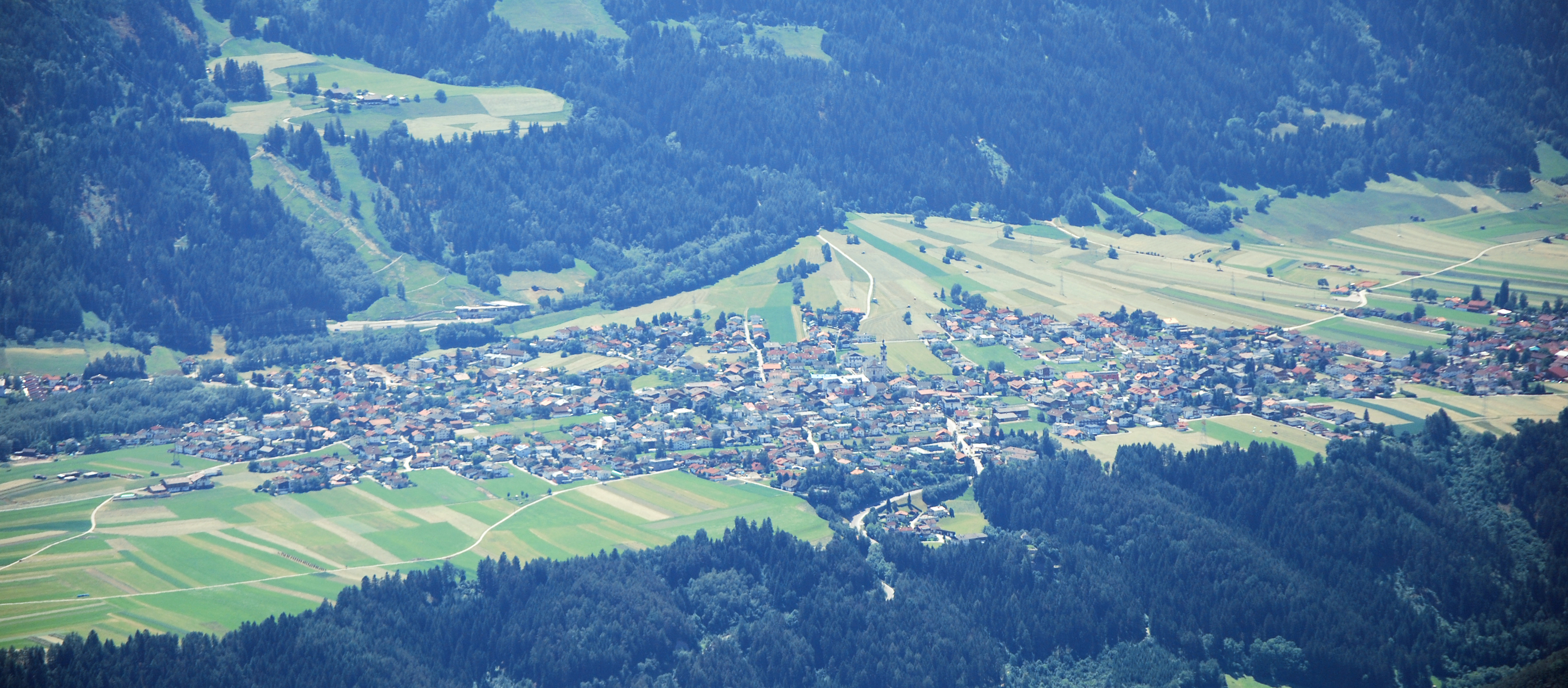

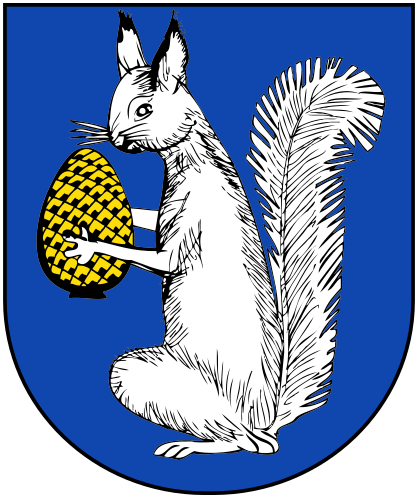
- Coat of arms

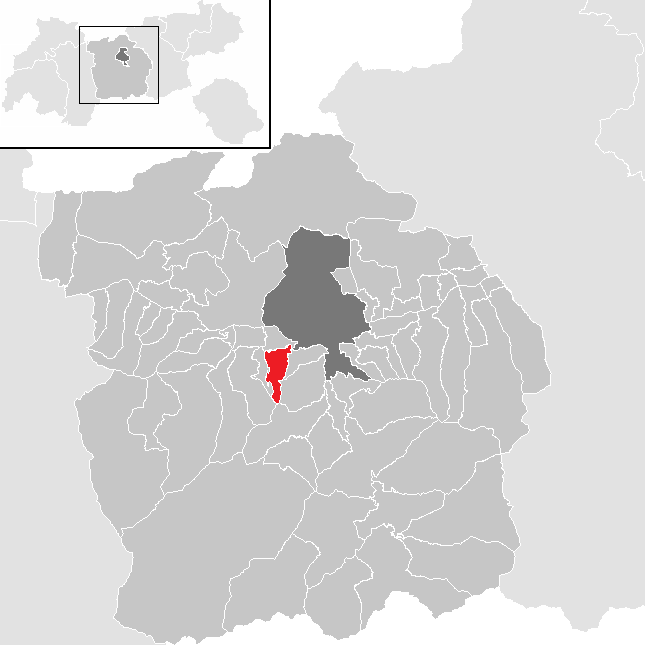
- Location in the district

- Location within Austria
- Coordinates: 47°14′10″N 11°18′41″E
- Country: Austria
- State: Tyrol
- District: Innsbruck Land

Government
  - Mayor: Hans Payr (Die neue ÖVP)

Area
  - Total: 9.72 km^{2} (3.75 sq mi)
- Elevation: 868 m (2,848 ft)

Population (2021)
  - Total: 4,138
  - Density: 426/km^{2} (1,100/sq mi)
- Time zone: UTC+1 (CET)
  - Summer (DST): UTC+2 (CEST)
- Postal code: 6091
- Area code: 05234
- Vehicle registration: IL
- Website: www.goetzens.tirol.gv.at

Götzens is a community in the district of Innsbruck-Land in Tyrol and lies on a terrace of the highlands above the capital. The nearest neighbouring villages are Axams and Birgitz in the west, with the towns of Mutters and Natters also nearby. The village was founded in 1869.

== Population ==
Historical population
| Year | Pop. | ±% |
|---|---|---|
| 1869 | 695 | — |
| 1880 | 683 | −1.7% |
| 1890 | 675 | −1.2% |
| 1900 | 652 | −3.4% |
| 1910 | 686 | +5.2% |
| 1923 | 677 | −1.3% |
| 1934 | 810 | +19.6% |
| 1939 | 857 | +5.8% |
| 1951 | 1,018 | +18.8% |
| 1961 | 1,249 | +22.7% |
| 1971 | 2,090 | +67.3% |
| 1981 | 2,734 | +30.8% |
| 1991 | 3,261 | +19.3% |
| 2001 | 3,526 | +8.1% |
| 2011 | 3,888 | +10.3% |
| 2015 | 3,984 | +2.5% |
