= David Evans (cricketer, born 1869) =

English cricketer (1869–1907)

Personal information
- Full name: David Linzee Evans
- Born: 13 April 1869; West Town, Somerset, England
- Died: 11 November 1907 (aged 38); West Town, Somerset, England
- Batting: Right-handed
- Bowling: Right-arm fast-medium

Domestic team information
- Years: Team
- 1889–1891: Gloucestershire
- 1894–1902: Somerset

Career statistics
Competition	FC
Matches	22
Runs scored	382
Batting average	9.79
100s/50s	0/2
Top score	60
Balls bowled	105
Wickets	1
Bowling average	51.00
5 wickets in innings	0
10 wickets in match	0
Best bowling	1/7
Catches/stumpings	8/–
- Source: CricketArchive, 22 December 2015

David Linzee Evans (13 April 1869 – 11 November 1907) played first-class cricket for Gloucestershire from 1889 to 1891 and for Somerset in 1894, 1895 and 1902.

Evans was born and died at West Town in Somerset. Educated at Loretto College, he was a right-handed middle-order batsman and an occasional fast-medium right-arm bowler. His was a curious first-class cricket career: he played 22 matches over 14 years (though he appeared in only six of those seasons) and was used as a specialist batsman. Yet his career average was less than 10. This lack of success is more remarkable as he passed 50 runs in an innings twice in his career, one of them a not-out innings.

== Gloucestershire player ==
Evans made his first-class debut at Lord's in the Middlesex v Gloucestershire match: he made 1 and 13 and took a single wicket, which would prove to be the only wicket of his first-class career. In his second match, against Sussex, he made an unbeaten 50 in Gloucestershire's follow-on, helping his county to draw the match. In nine other innings for Gloucestershire in the 1889, 1890 and 1891 seasons, however, he reached double figures only once, and then made only 12.

== Somerset player ==
In July 1894, he played six matches for Somerset, batting mostly in the lower order. He made 37 in a rain-ruined match against Lancashire. And then in the next match he joined his captain Sammy Woods with Somerset's score at 48 for six in the second innings against Surrey and together they put on 127 for the seventh wicket, Evans making 60 and Woods 80.

He appeared again in six matches in the 1895 season without similar success and in his final three matches in 1902 he failed in six innings to reach double figures, making only nine runs in all.

== Family ==
His older brother, Ernest Evans, appeared in one first-class cricket match for Somerset in 1891.
