= David Allan Evans =

American poet (born 1940)

David Allan Evans (born 1940 in Sioux City, Iowa) is an American poet. From 2002 to 2014, he was the poet laureate of the U.S. state of South Dakota.

== Life ==
He attended college on a football scholarship and earned degrees from Morningside College, the University of Iowa, and the University of Arkansas with a M.F.A. in creative writing. Since 1968, Evans has taught at South Dakota State University where he is a Professor of English and a Writer-in-Residence. Evans has published five books of poetry.

== Awards ==
He received two grants as a Fulbright Scholar to study in China, and was the first South Dakotan to receive a grant from the National Endowment for the Arts in 1974.
