= Dai Evans (footballer, born 1934) =

Welsh footballer

Personal information
- Full name: David Evans
- Date of birth: 19 June 1934 (age 92)
- Place of birth: Colwyn Bay, Wales
- Position: Goalkeeper

Senior career*
| Years | Team | Apps | (Gls) |
| 1955–1957 | Llandudno | | |
| 1957–1960 | Crewe Alexandra | 48 | (0) |
| 1960–1963 | Chelmsford City | 48 | (0) |
- Kidderminster Harriers
- * Club domestic league appearances and goals

David "Dai" Evans (born 19 June 1934) is a Welsh former footballer who played as a goalkeeper.

== Career ==
Evans began his career in 1955 at Welsh club Llandudno, before signing for Crewe Alexandra in the 1956–57 season. Evans made 48 Football League appearances during his time Crewe, before signing for Chelmsford City. In 1963, after three years at Chelmsford, Evans signed for Kidderminster Harriers.
