= Designing Your Life =

2016 book by Bill Burnett and Dave Evans

Designing Your Life: How to Build a Well-Lived, Joyful Life
- Author: Bill Burnett and Dave Evans
- Language: English
- Genres: self help; business
- Publisher: Knopf
- Publication date: Sep 20, 2016
- Publication place: United States of America
- Media type: Hardcover, Kindle Edition, Audio CD, Audible Audio
- Pages: 272 pages (hardcover)
- ISBN: 9781101875322
- OCLC: 948574586

Designing Your Life: How to Build a Well-Lived, Joyful Life is a book by Bill Burnett and Dave Evans that aims to help readers organize themselves through journaling and design thinking.

The New York Times best-selling book was published in 2016 by Knopf Doubleday Publishing Group and utilizes a series of exercises throughout its eleven chapters in order to provide others with a sense of structure in their lives. These creative and thought-provoking exercises allow the reader to reflect on their life and determine what they should do with their future. They can then generate a road map and plan how to accomplish their goals.

== Authors ==
Bill Burnett is the current executive director of the Design Program at Stanford. He has a Bachelor of Science and Master of Science in product design and has designed numerous products throughout his career. He obtained a design award for designing the first ever slate computer and also helps advise startups.

Dave Evans currently works alongside Burnett at the Design Program at Stanford. At a young age he worked at Apple where he helped design and market their first mouse. He then joined Electronic Arts as the first VP of Talent. In addition to co-writing Designing Your Life, he currently works with startups and nonprofit organizations.

== Origins ==
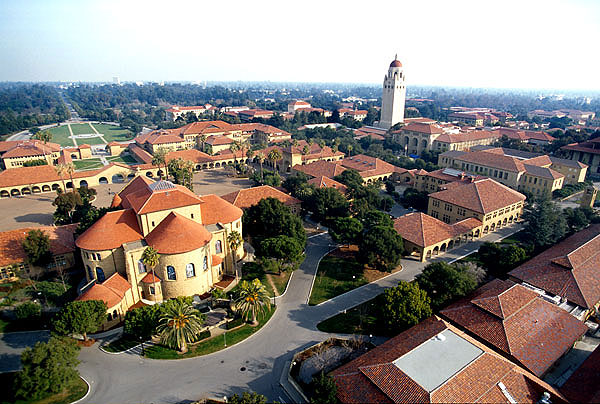
Stanford University is where the authors first started teaching the topics of the book

The book started off as an experimental Stanford University course of the same name that juniors and seniors would enroll in, similarly based in design thinking concepts and techniques. The aim was to prepare students to navigate life and work after graduation. The course launched in spring 2010, and at one point, 17% of university students were enrolled in the course.

The course was divided into two parts: reframing the problem and then teaching the tools and ideas. During the course, students learned about gratitude, generosity, self-awareness, adaptability. The course was pass or fail, and the final exam was to present three different five-year plans to their peers, sometimes coined "odyssey plans" among students. Some students claim to have a sense of purpose and determination to solve problems after completing this exercise.

== Chapter summaries ==
=== Start Where You Are ===
The book asks the reader to reflect on four areas of life (health, work, play, and love) and to gauge each of them on a scale of 1–10. This self-analysis is done for the reader to get a sense of what aspects of their life need the most (or least) attention. The book also promotes the idea of writing about each of these facets of life and how they intertwine with the uniqueness offered by the individual in the situation who is adhering to the journey within and through the process.

=== Building a Compass ===
In this chapter, the book assumes the reader now has a good starting point and is ready to build a "compass" that will help guide them through life. The compass is made up of a workview and a lifeview. The workview revolves on what the reader's perceptions of work are and how important it is to them. The lifeview involves the philosophical questions of what gives life meaning. After assessing the workview and lifeview, the reader is on their way to creating their compass.

=== Wayfinding ===
This chapter includes a journaling exercise, where the reader is asked to write down their day-to-day activities. They are then told to gauge them on engagement and energy. This is done for the reader to gain a sense of what activities are important to them and which ones seem unnecessary.

=== Getting Unstuck ===
This chapter places an emphasis on aiding those who feel stuck in life, whether it be an undesirable job or schoolwork. In order for the reader to find interest in life, the book suggests conducting a mind map for day-to-day activities along with the exercise from the chapter before it can help readers find activities that they may find more interesting.

=== Design Your Lives ===
The book encourages using the data that has been accumulated so far to conduct a plan for the future. This plan can be long or short term. The book once again proclaims the power of journaling and offers sample charts on how the reader should plan their future.

=== Prototyping ===
The book tells its readers to prototype their future plans. This means gathering information through experiences or conversations with others. This can help the reader realize what needs to be done in order for their future goals to become achieved.

=== How Not to Get a Job ===
Here the book shifts its focus from designing future plans to getting a good job. It provides some subtle tips and tricks that can make the reader more hire-able and appear more professional. It proclaims that when finding a job, one should focus on the needs of the employer instead of their own needs.

=== Designing Your Dream Job ===
The book acknowledges that not everyone may get their dream job, but that it is important to make good decisions that can lead to something close to that dream job. Journaling once again advised in order for the reader to self reflect and realize what their dream job may be.

=== Choosing Happiness ===
The book explains to the reader that happiness does not necessarily mean having everything one could desire. It places an emphasis on getting rid of things that are not necessary. It also helps explain that one should not dwell on past mistakes or bad decision-making, and that they should instead focus on ways to improve their decision-making abilities.

=== Failure Immunity ===
Failure is explained as something that is inevitable and that the reader must develop a form of "failure immunity" in order to embrace their mistakes and learn from them. It also recommends logging the reader's failures in their journal so that they can better remember them and think of a way to solve them.

=== Building a Team ===
This chapter emphasizes the importance of others. Friends and family are necessary when the reader is in times of need. The book tells the importance of teamwork in order to overcome the toughest of obstacles that may lie in one's way. Building a strong team is vital to success and happiness in life.

=== Conclusion - A Well-Designed Life ===
The book closes by explaining that the methods learned throughout the chapters will always be useful. It explains that even after retirement, it is still necessary for one to design their life in order to achieve maximum happiness and satisfaction. It then makes a comparison of life to a design project that constantly needs to be created.
