= David Evans (rugby union, born 1988) =

Welsh rugby union player

- Born: David Evans; 19 August 1988 (age 38) Swansea, Wales
- Height: 5 ft 10 in (1.78 m)
- Weight: 84 kg (13 st 3 lb)
- University: Swansea University

Rugby union career
- Position: Wing
Senior career
Years	Team	Apps	(Points)
–	Neath RFC		

David Evans (born 19 August 1988 in Swansea, Wales) is a rugby union player for Neath RFC. He has been selected for the current Wales national rugby sevens team 2008–09 squad.
