= Dave Evans (entrepreneur) =

American entrepreneur

Dave Evans is an entrepreneur who led the design of Apple's first mouse and was an early employee at Electronic Arts before becoming a Consulting Assistant Professor at Stanford University. He also co-wrote the book Designing Your Life: How to Build a Well-Lived, Joyful Life with Bill Burnett, which was published by Knopf in 2016. Evans and Burnett also created a class called "Designing Your Life" at Stanford University.

He graduated from Stanford with a master's degree in mechanical engineering. Evans has also worked as a professor at the University of California - Berkeley.
