= David Evans (geneticist) =

Australian statistical geneticist

- Education: University of Queensland
- Known for: Mendelian randomization Complex trait genetics
- Scientific career
- Fields: Statistical genetics
- Workplaces: University of Bristol; University of Queensland

David M. Evans is Professor of Statistical Genetics and Head of Genomic Medicine at the Diamantina Institute at the University of Queensland. He received his Ph.D. from the University of Queensland in 2003, after which he completed a four-year postdoc at the University of Oxford's Wellcome Trust Centre for Human Genetics. During his postdoc, he conducted research for the International HapMap Project and the Wellcome Trust Case Control Consortium. In 2007, he became a senior lecturer at the University of Bristol, where he conducted research on genome-wide association studies based on the Avon Longitudinal Study of Parents and Children. He became a professor at the University of Queensland in 2013. He is known for researching the genetics of complex traits in humans, such as osteoporosis, asthma, and binge eating, as well as his broader work on causal inference and devoloping new statistical techniques. He was an ISI Highly Cited Researcher in 2015 and 2016.
