= David Evans (Somerset cricketer, born 1928) =

English cricketer

Personal information
- Full name: George Herbert David Evans
- Born: 22 August 1928; Westbury-on-Trym, Bristol, England
- Died: 20 June 1991 (aged 62); Weston-super-Mare, Somerset, England
- Batting: Right-handed
- Bowling: Right-arm medium

Domestic team information
- Years: Team
- 1953: Somerset

Career statistics
Competition	FC
Matches	8
Runs scored	180
Batting average	12.85
100s/50s	0/0
Top score	42
Balls bowled	48
Wickets	0
Bowling average	–
5 wickets in innings	–
10 wickets in match	–
Best bowling	0/4
Catches/stumpings	5/–
- Source: CricketArchive, 22 December 2015

George Herbert David Evans (22 August 1928 – 20 June 1991) was a cricketer who played eight first-class matches for Somerset in 1953.

Evans was born at Westbury-on-Trym, Bristol. A club cricketer in Weston-super-Mare, he played first for Somerset's first team as a right-handed middle-order batsman in June 1953 in a three-day non-first-class match against a Royal Air Force team that included Fred Trueman, top-scoring with 34 in the county's first innings and making 56 in the second innings, when Harold Gimblett got a century. He then made his first-class debut in a crushing two-day defeat by Glamorgan in which he failed to reach double figures in either innings. He was one of several batsmen who filled various batting positions across the middle of the summer in a very poor side, which finished bottom of the County Championship for the second year in succession. Only in his final innings, 42 against Essex at Weston-super-Mare, did he make much impact: his stand of 86 for the sixth wicket with Johnny Lawrence was deemed "spirited" by Wisden Cricketers' Almanack, though Somerset were following on at the time and lost the match rather easily. His medium-pace bowling failed to take a wicket in eight overs in his first-class matches.

In his life outside cricket, he was a chartered accountant in Weston-super-Mare. He also represented Wales at field hockey. He died after a heart attack at work, aged 62. He died at Weston-super-Mare, Somerset.
