= David Evans (rugby union, born 1909) =

- Full name: David Dan Evans
- Born: 7 April 1909 Barry, Glamorgan Wales
- Died: 7 September 1992 (aged 83) Winsley, Wiltshire, England

Rugby union career
- Position: Scrum-half
International career
Years	Team	Apps	(Points)
1934	Wales	1	(0)

David Dan Evans (7 April 1909 – 7 September 1992) was a Welsh international rugby union player.

Evans was born outside Barry in Glamorgan and played his early rugby with Cardiff University.

A teacher by profession, Evans took up a position at Calday Grange Grammar School in 1930 and began playing for Old Caldeians, from where he gained Cheshire representative honours. He received one Wales cap in 1934, as part of a new halfback combination for the Home Nations opener against England. His partnership with Cliff Jones was largely ineffective in a losing cause and he was replaced for the next match by Bert Jones.

== See also ==
- List of Wales national rugby union players
