= Sì (dessert) =

Chinese traditional spherical dessert

- Chinese: 𥻵
Transcriptions
Eastern Min
- Fuzhou BUC: sì

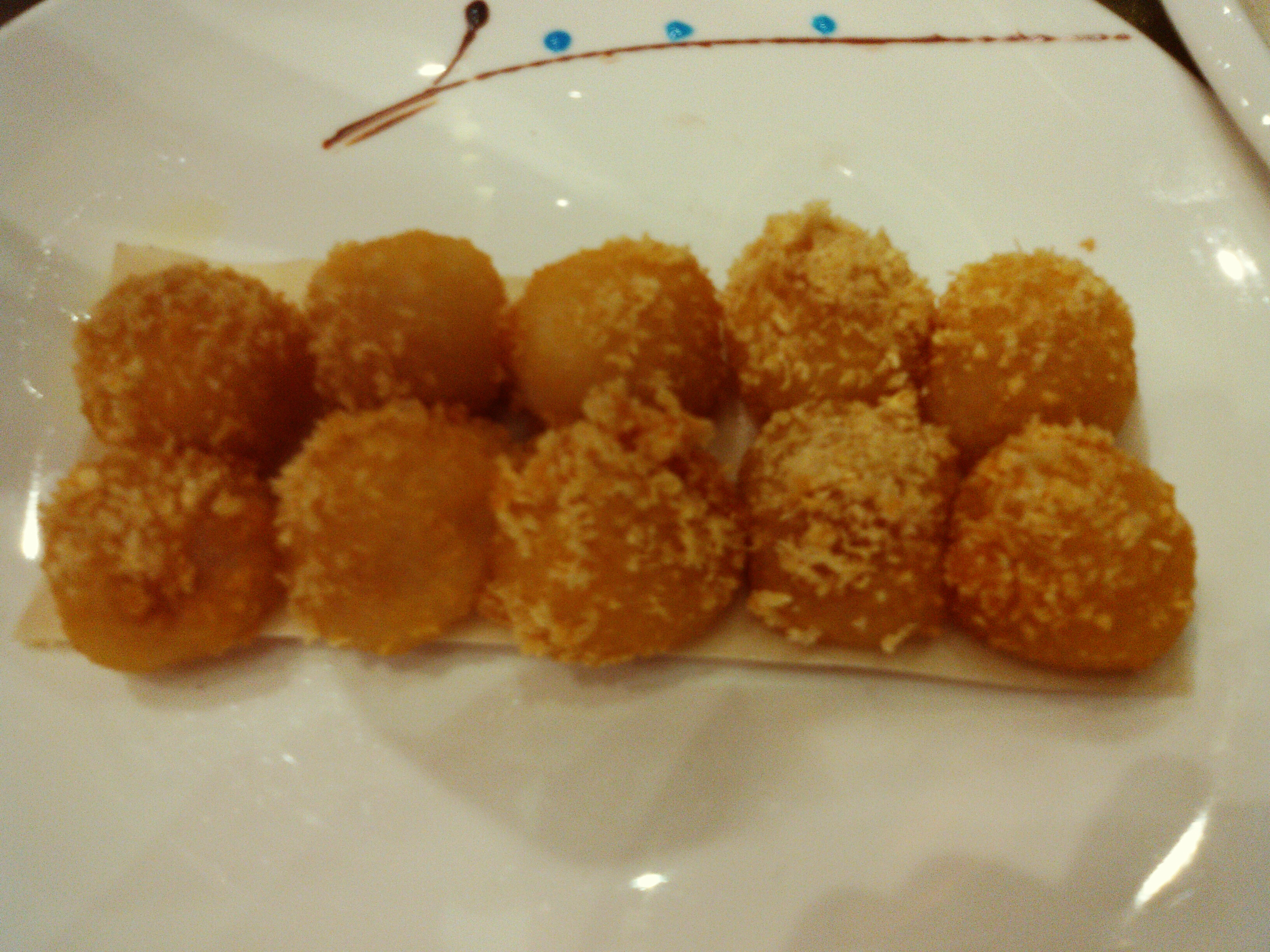
Sì (𥻵)

Sì (pronounced [si˥˧], Min Dong Chinese: 𥻵, transcribed as sì in Foochow Romanized) is a traditional spherical dessert made from glutinous rice, eaten in celebration of the Winter Solstice festival in Fuzhou, Fujian Province, China. It is usually produced without filling, in contrast to the tangyuan. The sì is made by grinding glutinous rice into a powder, pressing the powder until almost dry, and then rolling the dry powder into a spherical shape, and finally adding fried (even burnt) soybean powder mixed with brown sugar onto the glutinous rice sphere.

The pronunciation of 𥻵 is the same as 時 (time, fortune) in Fuzhou dialect of Chinese. The "turn" in fortune is embodied in a well-known chengyu (simplified Chinese: 时来运转; traditional Chinese: 時來運轉; pinyin: shíláiyùnzhuǎn; lit. 'time comes', 'fortune turns'), often linked to the Winter Solstice, which in the Fuzhou dialect is pronounced the same as "[when] sì comes, fortune turns" (BUC: sì-lài-ông-diōng). As a result of these homophones, many Fuzhou people believe that eating sì may result in good fortune.

== Folk rhyme ==
Fuzhou Chinese (Chinese characters)	Fuzhou Chinese (Foochow Romanized)	English Translation
搓𥻵之搓搓， 依奶疼依哥。 依哥有老媽， 依弟單身哥。	Chŏ̤ sì chĭ chŏ̤ chŏ̤, ĭ-nā̤ tiáng ĭ-gŏ̤. ĭ-gŏ̤ ô lâu-mā, ĭ-diê dăng-sĭng-gŏ̤.	Making Sì, roll and roll, The mother dearly loves the elder brother. (After) the elder brother has a wife, The younger brother is (still) single.
