= Tangyuan =

Traditional Chinese dessert

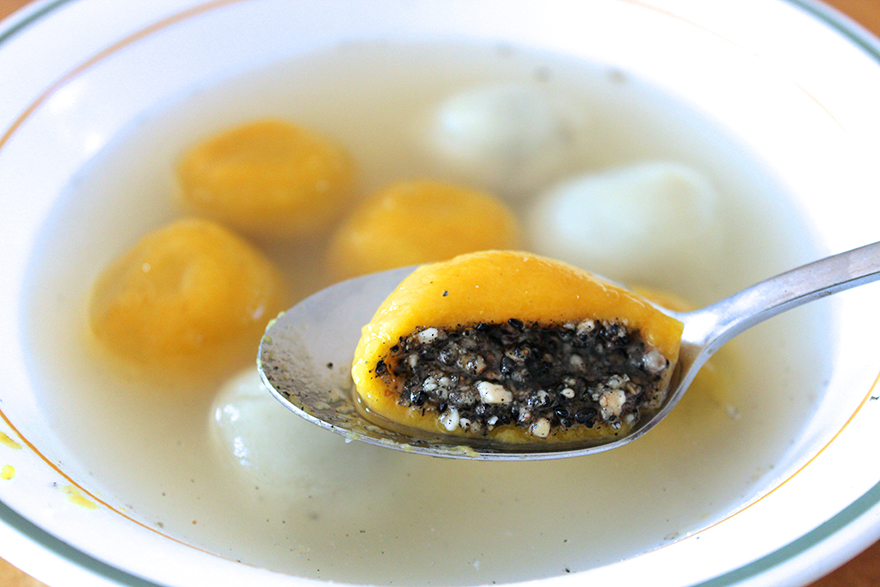
- Tangyuan made from glutinous rice flour, filled with black sesame paste
- Alternative names: sweet dumplings
- Place of origin: China
- Region or state: East Asia
- Main ingredients: Glutinous rice flour
- Variations: Regional variants differing in ingredients and method
- Other information: Traditionally consumed during Yuanxiao (Lantern Festival)

Tangyuan
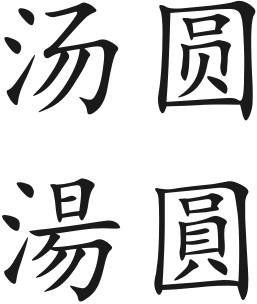
- Tangyuan in Simplified Chinese (top) and Traditional Chinese (below) character
- Traditional Chinese: 湯圓
- Simplified Chinese: 汤圆
- Literal meaning: soup ball
Transcriptions
Standard Mandarin
- Hanyu Pinyin: tāngyuán
Hakka
- Romanization: tongˊ ienˇ
Yue: Cantonese
- Yale Romanization: tōngyún
- Jyutping: tong1 jyun2

Yuanxiao
- Chinese: 元宵
Transcriptions
Standard Mandarin
- Hanyu Pinyin: yuánxiāo
Yue: Cantonese
- Yale Romanization: yùhnsīu
- Jyutping: jyun4 siu1
Southern Min
- Hokkien POJ: gôan-siau

Hokkien name
- Traditional Chinese: 圓仔/米圓
- Simplified Chinese: 圆仔/米圆
Transcriptions
Southern Min
- Hokkien POJ: îⁿ-á/bí-îⁿ

Wu Chinese name
- Traditional Chinese: 湯團/湯糰
- Simplified Chinese: 汤团
Transcriptions
Standard Mandarin
- Hanyu Pinyin: tāngtuán
Wu
- Romanization: thaon deu Wu Chinese pronunciation: [tʰã dø]

Tangyuan is a traditional Chinese dessert made of glutinous rice shaped into balls that is served in a hot broth or syrup. They come in varying sizes, anything between a marble to a ping-pong ball, and are often stuffed with filling. Tangyuan are traditionally eaten during the Lantern Festival, but because the name is a near homophone for reunion (traditional Chinese: 團圓; simplified Chinese: 团圆; pinyin: tuányuán) and symbolizes togetherness and completeness, this dish is also served at weddings, family reunions, Chinese New Year, and the Dōngzhì (winter solstice) festival.

== Description ==
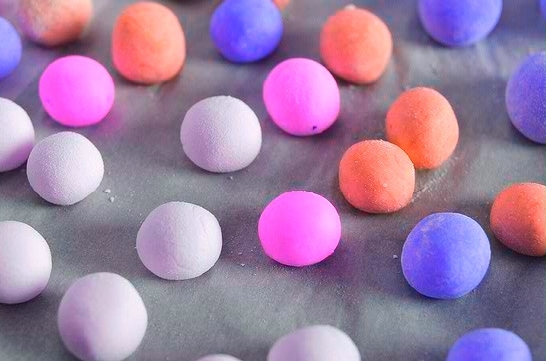
Rainbow-like tangyuan, which can be filled with flavoring such as fruit preserves

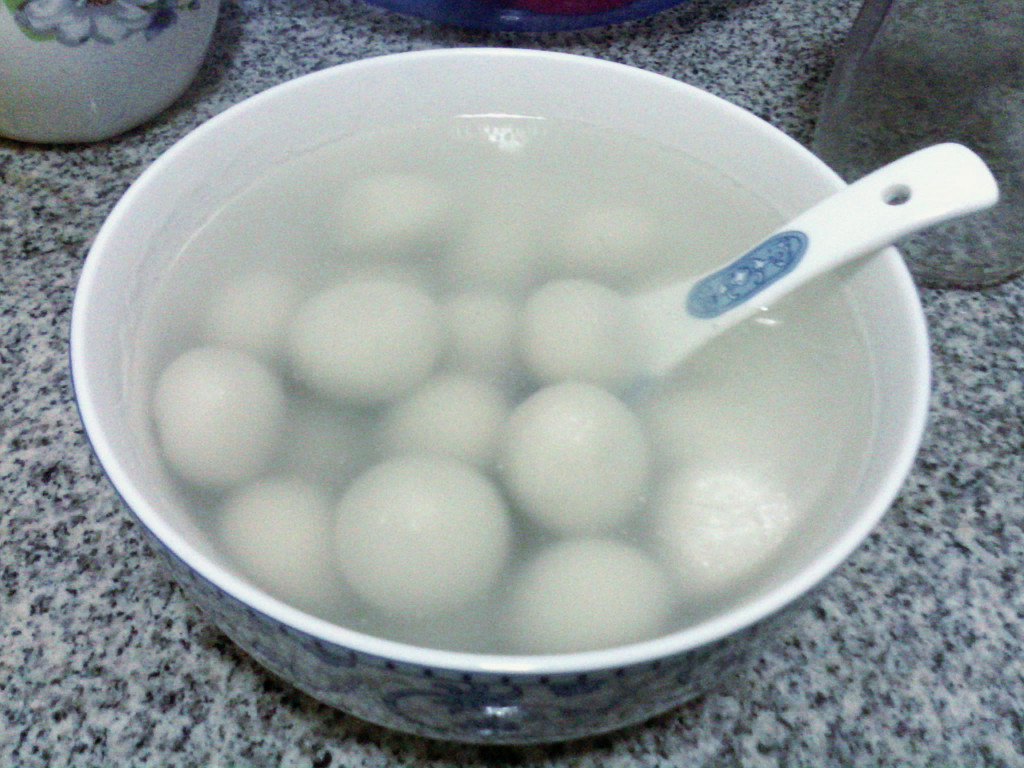
Traditional tangyuan with sweet sesame filling

Tangyuan is a versatile dessert with a delicate taste and soft, chewy texture. While it can be served in its simplest form as a plain white ball of glutinous rice, it can also be stuffed with either black sesame or other fillings such as crushed peanuts. They can also be colored, fried, and boiled.

Tangyuan is made by wrapping the glutinous rice dough around the filling and shaping it into a ball by hand. Tangyuan can be sweet or savory. Sweet tangyuan can be served in ginger-infused syrup, whereas savory tangyuan are served in a clear soup broth. Unfilled tangyuan are served as part of a sweet dessert soup known in Cantonese cuisine as tong sui (literally: "sugar water").

== Ingredients ==
The traditional filling for tangyuan is made from sesame, peanuts, sugar, and animal fat such as lard.

=== Common soup bases ===
- Red bean soup
- Black sesame soup
- Ginger and rock sugar
- Fermented glutinous rice (Chinese: 醪糟 or 酒釀), Sweet Osmanthus, and rock sugar.
- Sweet pandan soup

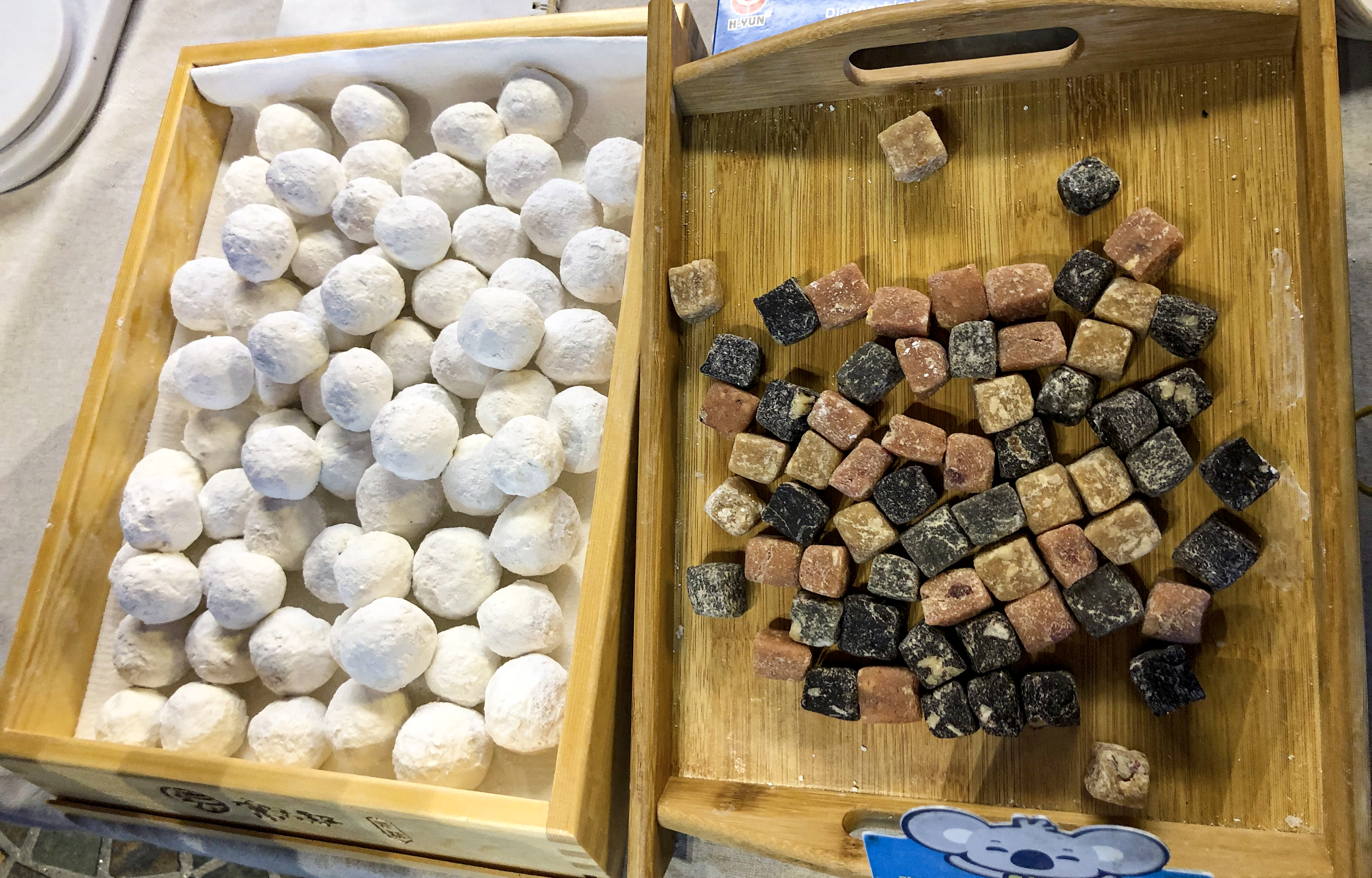
The filling of Tangyuan

=== Sweet fillings ===
- Black sesame (mixed with sugar)
- Crushed peanuts (mixed with sugar)
- Jujube paste
- Red bean paste (Azuki bean)
- Lotus seed paste
- Pumpkin paste
- Black bean paste

=== Savory fillings ===
- Crushed peanuts
- Minced meat
- Mushroom
- Cabbage
- Chinese sausage
- Cilantro
- Dried shrimp
- Radish

=== Modern adaptations ===
- Chocolate paste (softened butter mixed with cocoa powder and stirred until blended)
- Matcha paste
- Custard
- Taro paste
- Coconut paste

== History ==
Tangyuan is traditionally eaten during the Lantern Festival, which falls on the 15th day of the first month of a chinese new year, which is the first full moon. People eat tangyuan for good luck and hopes of filling their lives with fortune and joy.

=== Yuanxiao myth ===
According to legend, there was a maid in the palace during the reign of Emperor Wu of the Han Dynasty named "Yuanxiao".

She was secluded in the palace for years, missing her parents and crying all day long. Minister Dongfang Shuo was determined to help her, so he lied to Emperor Wu of Han that the God of Fire was ordered by the Jade Emperor to burn Chang'an on the fifteenth day of the first lunar month. The only way to escape the disaster was to let the "Yuanxiao girl" make a lot of glutinous rice balls, which the God of Fire loved to eat, on the fifteenth day of the first lunar month, and all the subjects would light lanterns and offer sacrifices to her. Emperor Wu of Han approved the request, and the "Yuanxiao girl" finally saw her family. From then on, the Lantern Festival was formed.

=== Tangyuan development in China ===
The practice of eating tangyuan has been around for over 2,000 years, and has had several names over the years. During the Yongle era of the Ming dynasty, it was called yuanxiao in northern China. This name translates to 'first night', where yuan (元) means 'first' and xiao (宵) means 'night'.

During the Tang and Five Dynasties, people ate "noodle cocoons" and "round dumplings without corners" during the Lantern Festival. In the Southern Song Dynasty, "lactose dumplings" appeared. In the poem "Yuanxiao Boiled Floating Dumplings", there is a sentence like "stars shine in the dark clouds, pearls float in the turbid water". These foods can be regarded as the predecessors of glutinous rice balls. By the Ming Dynasty, "yuanxiao" had more names.

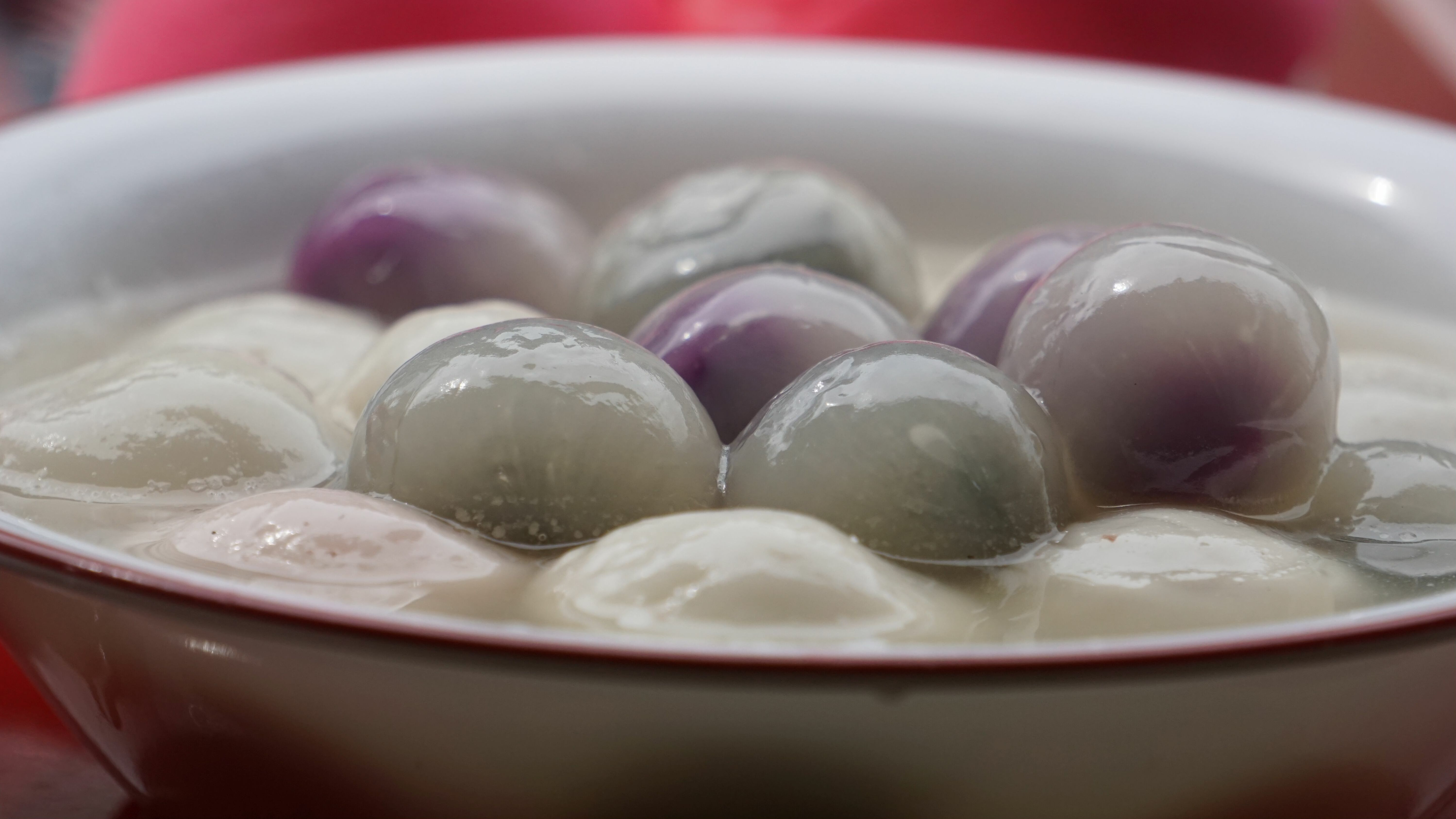
Tangyuan

People in southern China call the dish tangyuan or tangtuan. In the Hakka and Cantonese varieties of Chinese, tangyuan is pronounced as tong^{1} yan^{2} or tong^{1} jyun^{4-2}, and the term tangtuan is not commonly used. Legend has it that during Yuan Shikai's rule from 1912 to 1916, he disliked the name yuanxiao because it sounded identical to "remove Yuan" (Chinese: 袁消; pinyin: yuán xiāo); thus he gave orders to change the name to tangyuan. This new moniker directly translates to 'round balls in soup' or 'round dumplings in soup'. Nowadays, tangyuan refers to the southern style, whereas yuanxiao refers to the northern style. The two are primarily differentiated by their method of preparation.

=== Geographical differences ===
Tangyuan originate from southern China, whereas people in the north call the dish yuanxiao. Like tangyuan, yuanxiao are glutinous rice balls stuffed with filling that are eaten during the Lantern Festival and other important gatherings. Although they look alike, they are two separate things. The fundamental differences lie in their preparation, fillings, cooking, and storage. The Chaozhou variation of tangyuan is known as ah bho liang (鴨母捻), which has a different filling.

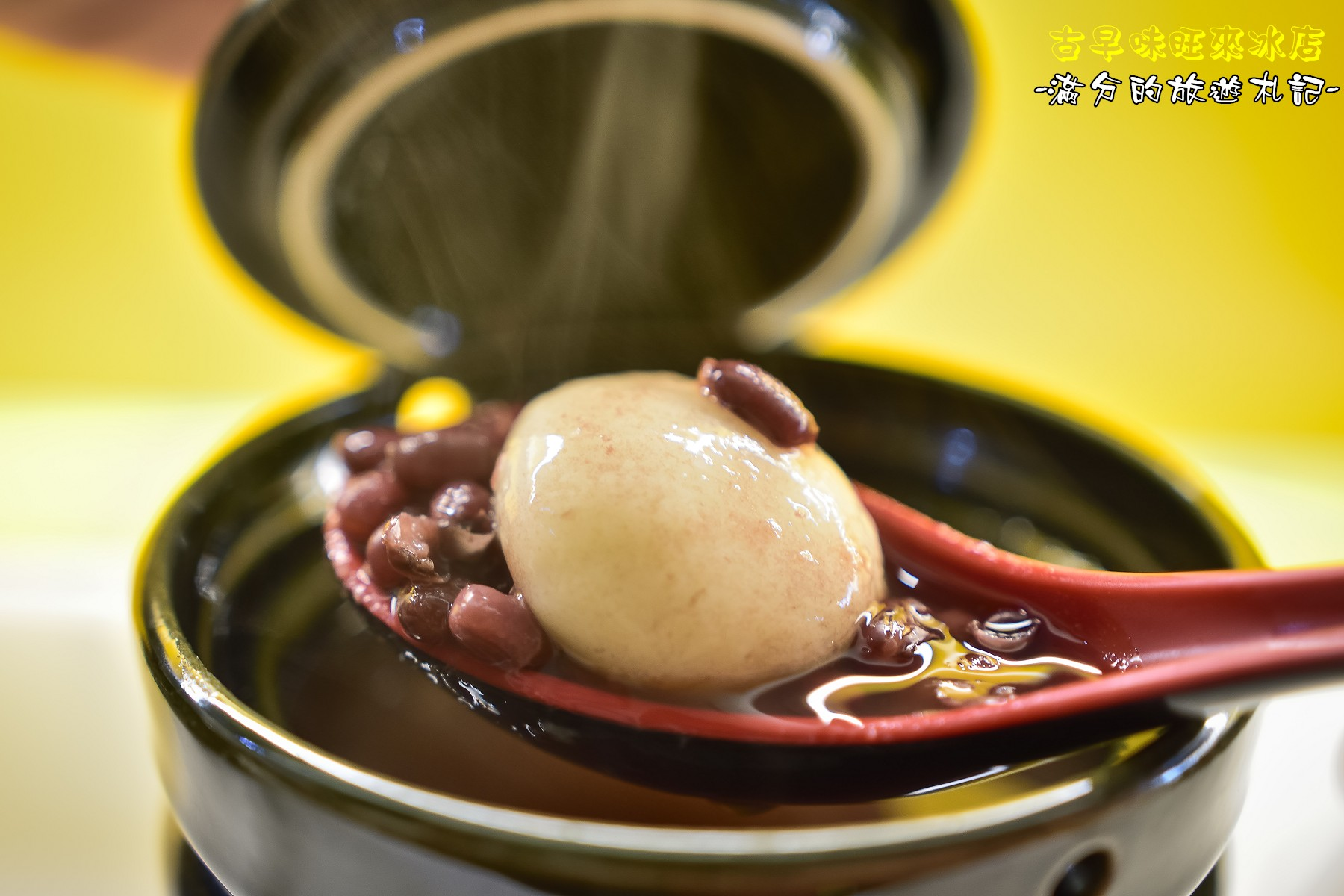
Red bean tangyuan

Yuanxiao have sweet and solid fillings and are served in a thick broth. The surface tends to be dry and soft, and they have a short shelf life. The process of making the dish begins with preparing the solid fillings that are then cut into small pieces. The filling is dipped first into water, then into the dry glutinous rice flour, repeatedly until a round shape is achieved.

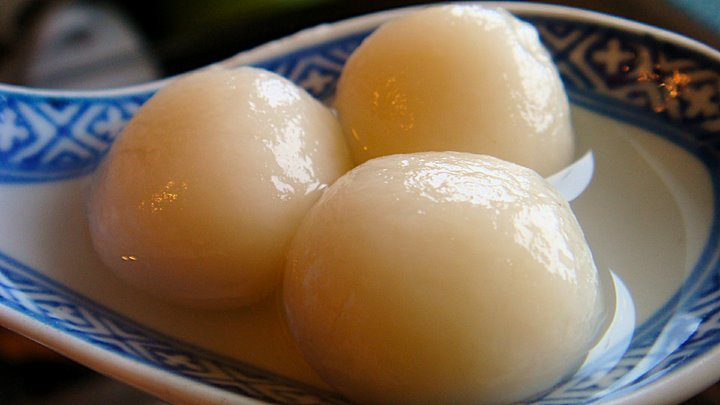
Tangyuan

Tangyuan can be stuffed with a variety of soft fillings that are either sweet or salty, and are served in a thinner soup. The texture is smooth and glutinous, and they can be stored frozen for a long time. Tangyuan are made by wrapping the soft filling in a glutinous rice "dough" and shaping it into a ball. The southern variation is served in a broth that changes depending on the filling. Daikon and fish cake broth are used for savory fillings, and tong sui for sweeter options.

The taste of tangyuan is quite different between the north and the south in China. People in the north call making yuanxiao "shaking yuanxiao". The climate in the north is dry, and if you use glutinous rice flour to wrap it, it will easily dry and crack, and when you cook it, it will become a mixed soup, and the skin and stuffing will separate. So in the north, people first prepare the stuffing and cut it into small cubes, put the glutinous rice flour with appropriate dryness and wetness in a basket, put the cut small cubes of stuffing on top, and shake the basket to let the wet glutinous rice flour evenly wrap the small stuffing, and slowly shake it from a small ball into a yuanxiao of appropriate size. This is what people often call shaking yuanxiao. The way yuanxiao is made makes the stuffing and the dough tightly wrapped together, which is different from the southern glutinous rice balls where the skin and stuffing are separated.

Southerners eat glutinous rice balls. Yuanxiao is basically sweet, while glutinous rice balls are both sweet and salty. In Guizhou, there is also a dish called stir-fried glutinous rice balls with pickled vegetables. Glutinous rice balls are no longer a staple food or a snack, but a special dish that is both a dish and a meal. Southern China also have different kinds of tangyuan, such as Ningbo tangyuan, Guangdong chaoshan tangyuan, and Shandong sesame jujube paste tangyuan. Each region has its own unique flavor.

=== Cultural significance ===
For many Chinese families in mainland China as well as overseas, tangyuan are traditionally eaten during the Lantern Festival, Chinese New Year, and gatherings with family to celebrate. Their round shape and the bowls in which they are served hold cultural and symbolic significance, symbolizing togetherness, unity, and reunion.

== Availability ==
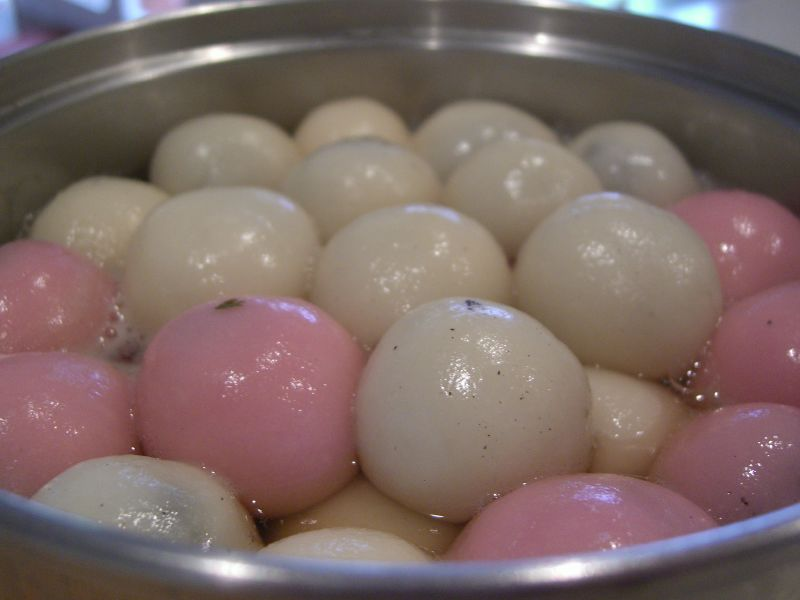
Tangyuan, a traditional Dongzhi Festival food

The most renowned varieties come from Ningbo in Zhejiang Province. However, they are traditionally eaten throughout China.

Tangyuan has also come to be associated with the Winter Solstice and Chinese New Year in various regions. Today, the food is eaten all year round. Mass-produced tangyuan is commonly found in the frozen food section of Asian supermarkets in China and overseas.

== Contemporary styles ==
While tangyuan began as a traditional snack eaten during festivals, it has evolved into a dessert that is consumed all year. As it became more widespread, tangyuan have changed to adapt to current tastes. New fillings, shapes, and coloring of the glutinous rice were introduced; chocolate and custard fillings now accompany traditional choices.

For convenience, tangyuan manufacturers also create frozen ready-to-cook tangyuan. These can be kept refrigerated for long periods of time.

== Variations ==
As the Chinese dessert spread to other regions of Asia, a variety of renditions emerged from different cultures.

=== China ===
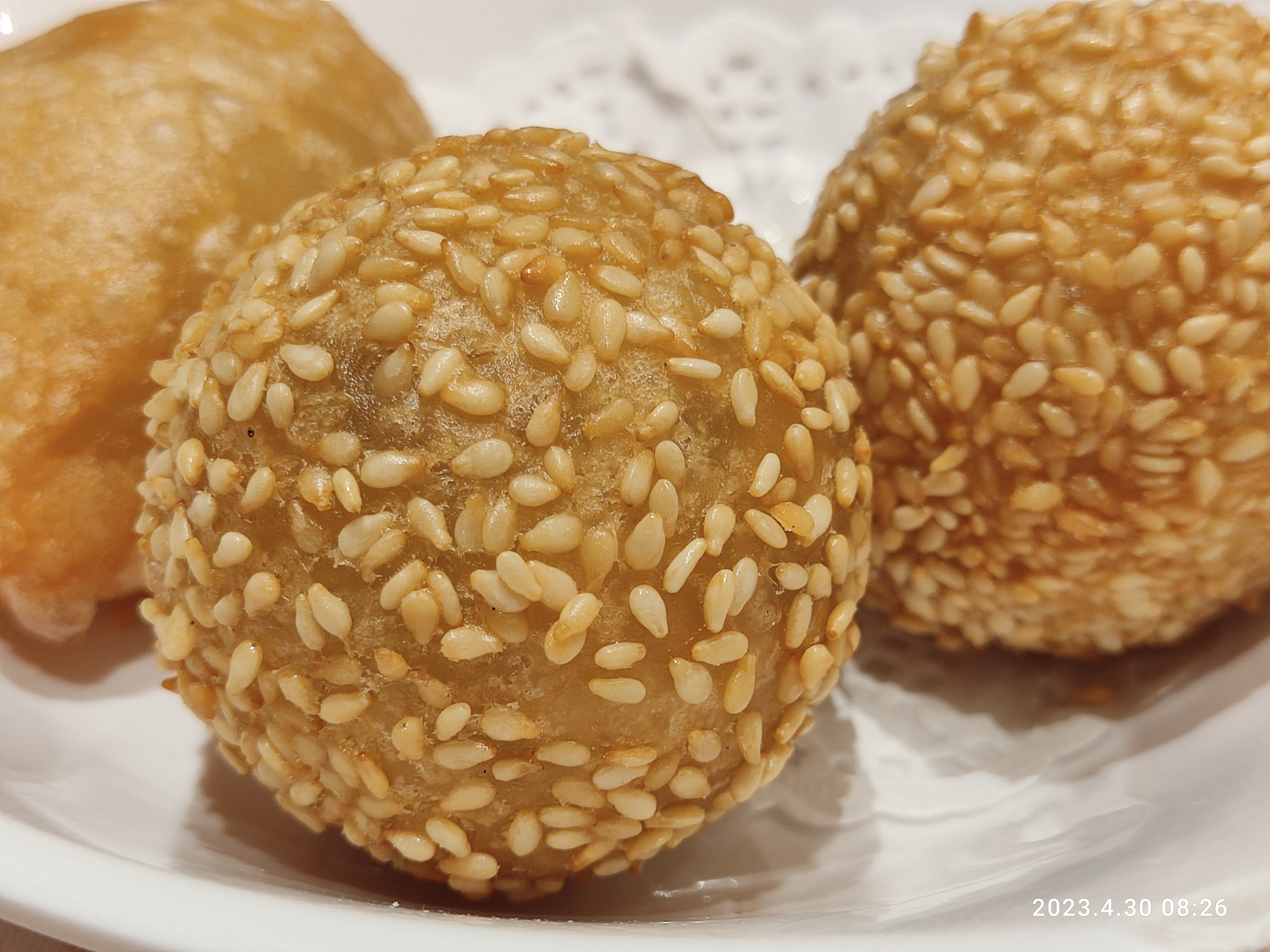
Jian dui

Jiandui, or sesame balls, are a variation of tangyuan. They are made with glutinous rice flour that is fried and coated with sesame seeds to achieve a crisp, chewy texture. The insides of the dessert are stuffed with lotus paste, black sesame, or red bean paste.

=== Japan ===
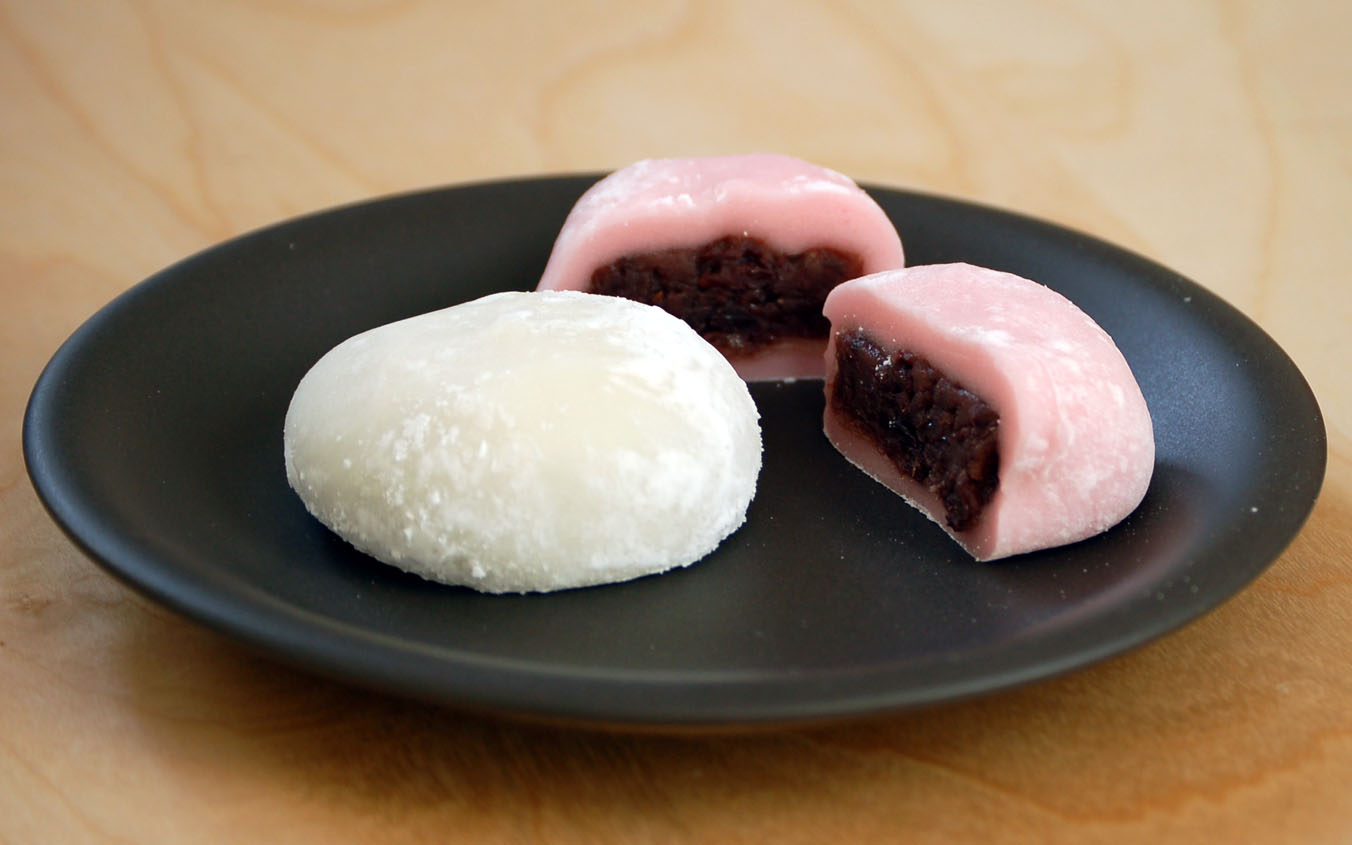
Daifuku

Japanese daifuku-mochi are similar to tangyuan. They were initially introduced from Southeast Asia during the Heian period. This traditional Japanese dessert consists of glutinous rice stuffed with sweet fillings like anko, a sweetened red bean paste made from azuki beans. While daifuku-mochi are similar to tangyuan, the preparation process is different; wet milling is used to achieve a chewy texture that makes mochi less soft than their Chinese counterpart.

=== South Korea ===
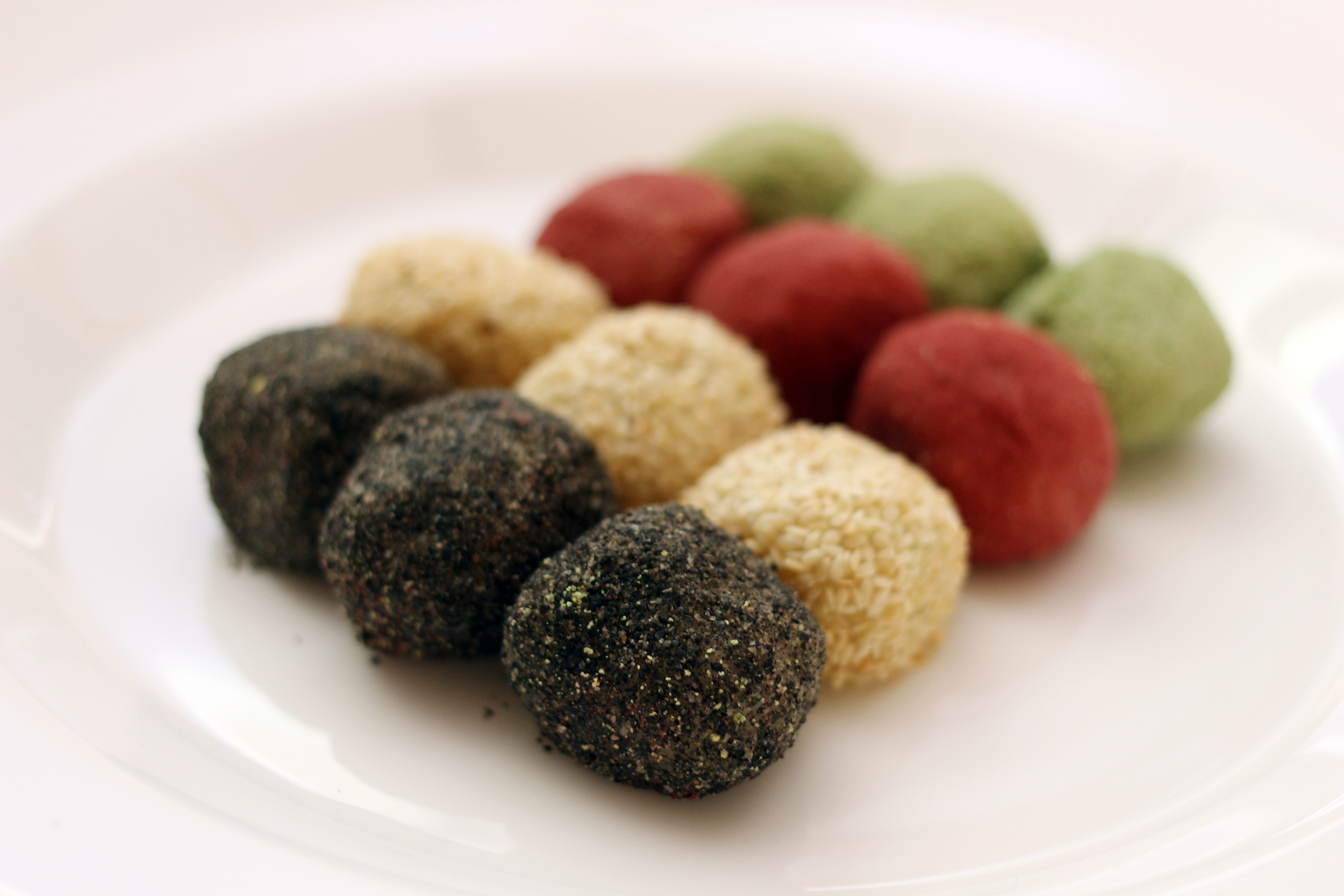
Gyeongdan

Gyeongdan are Korean rice cake balls made from glutinous rice flour, similar in texture to tangyuan but usually filled with red bean paste or rolled in toppings like powdered soybean, sesame seeds, or mugwort. They are frequently eaten on special occasions and Korean holidays.

=== Indonesia ===
In Indonesia, an adapted version called wedang ronde (Javanese: ꦮꦺꦢꦁ ꦫꦺꦴꦤ꧀ꦝꦺ, romanized: wédang rondhé, lit. 'round ball beverage') is a popular food eaten during cold temperatures. The round colored balls of glutinous rice can be filled with crushed peanuts and sugar, or left plain, and are served in a sweetened, mild ginger broth often boiled in fragrant pandan leaves. Crushed, toasted peanuts, tapioca pearls, and slices of coconut can also be added.

=== Malaysia ===
In Malaysia, buah Melaka (lit. 'Malacca fruit') or onde-onde is a dessert mainly made of glutinous rice flour which is popular among Malay Malaysians. The green pandan-colored ball is sprinkled with dry coconut shavings and filled with semi-liquefied sweet gula Melaka (lit. 'Malacca sugar'), a type of molasses made from palm nectar. It is enjoyed throughout the tropical summer year and usually sold by Malay street hawkers and the Melaka straits-born Chinese community. It is usually enjoyed during teatime and breakfast. A common accompaniment is hot Darjeeling tea. Buah Melaka most likely originated from Straits-born Chinese Baba–Nyonya in Malacca, hence the name.

=== Myanmar (Burma) ===
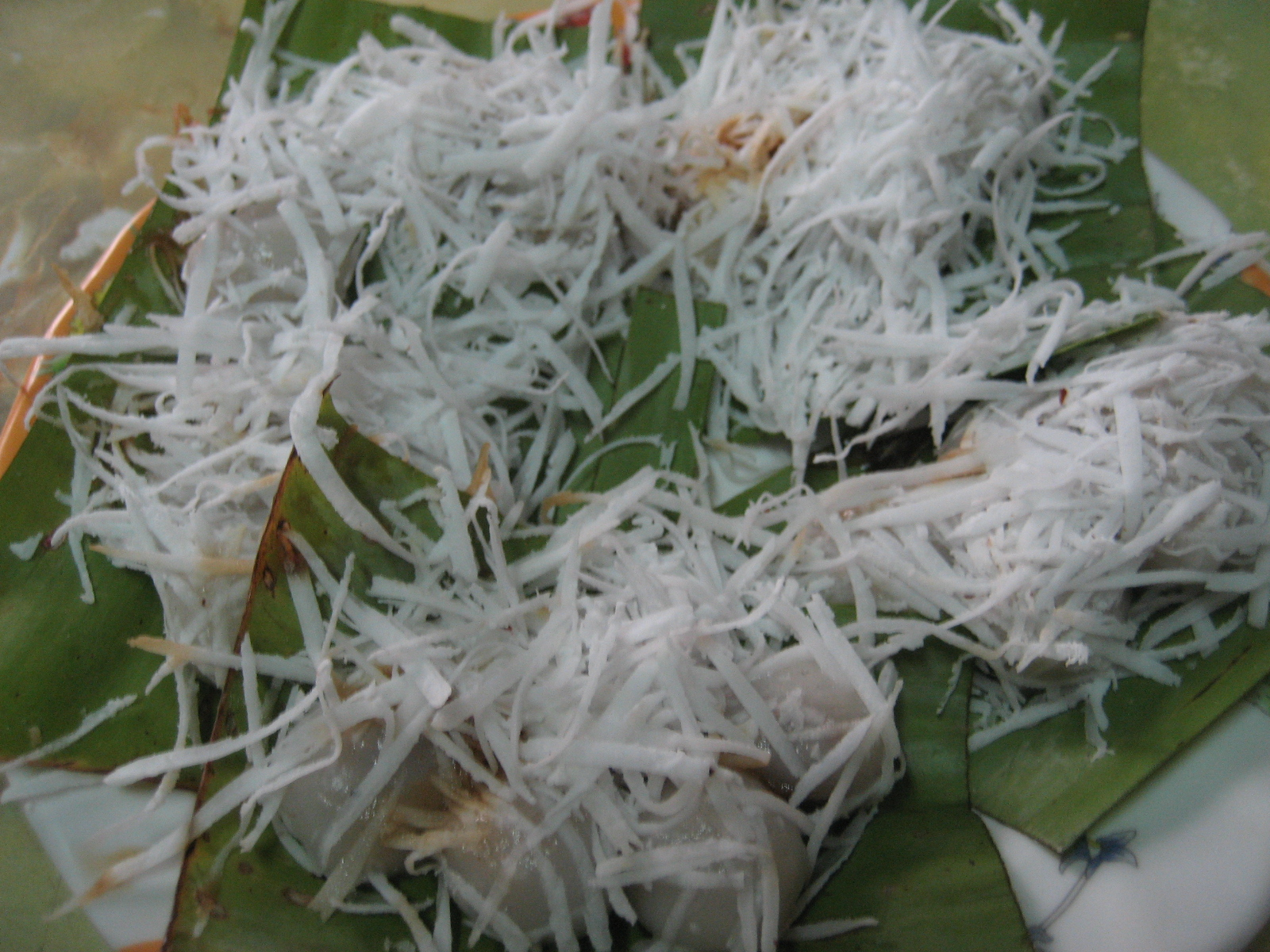
Mont lone yay paw, served with shredded coconut, is a popular festive dish served in Myanmar during Thingyan.

In Myanmar, mont lone yay baw (မုန့်လုံးရေပေါ်) is a traditional festive dish, served during Thingyan, and filled with pieces of jaggery and served with coconut shavings.

=== Philippines ===
In the Philippines, traditional Chinese tangyuan is called chiōng-uân-îⁿ (Chinese: 狀元圓; lit. 'zhuangyuan ball') or siōng-guân-îⁿ (Chinese: 上元圓; lit. 'Lantern Festival ball') in Philippine Hokkien by Chinese Filipinos.

=== Thailand ===
In Thailand, bua loi (บัวลอย) is a sweet glutinous rice flour balls in the coconut milk or ginger syrup.

=== Vietnam ===
In southern Vietnam, a similar dish called chè trôi nước, is served in a mild, sweet liquid flavored with grated ginger root. In northern Vietnam, bánh trôi (also called bánh trôi nước) and bánh chay are analogous, with the latter being served with coconut milk. The Hmong people in northern Vietnam also have a similar dessert called thắng dền, made with glutinous rice for the balls, mung beans, coconut meat, or sesame for the filling, served in hot grated ginger root soup, sometimes with roasted peanuts.

== See also ==
- Hong dou tang – Chinese sweet dessert soup (red bean soup)
- Klepon – Southeast Asian traditional rice cake
- List of Chinese desserts
- List of desserts
- List of dumplings
- Tang bu shuai – Cantonese rice flour ball dessert
