= S1 (Indian TV channel) =

S1 NEWS
- Country: India
- Broadcast area: India
- Headquarters: Delhi, India

Programming
- Language: Hindi
- Picture format: 480i (SDTV)

Ownership
- Owner: Senior Media Limited

History
- Launched: 2005

S1 (also known as S1 Television) is a 24-hour Hindi news channel launched in India by Mr. Vijay Dixit, CMD, Senior Media Group on 6 August 2005. It is an initiative of Senior Media Limited which also owns the fortnightly socio-political Hindi magazine 'Senior India'. The channel was launched in 2005. The channel is headquartered in Noida, Uttar Pradesh.
