= 1930 FIFA World Cup squads =

International football tournament

Below are the squads for the 1930 FIFA World Cup tournament in Uruguay.

Yugoslavia (3 players from French clubs) and Peru (1 player from a Mexican club) were the only teams to have players from foreign clubs.

== Group 1 ==
=== Argentina ===
Head coaches: Francisco Olazar and Juan José Tramutola

No.	Pos.	Player	Date of birth (age)	Caps	Club
	GK	Ángel Bossio	5 May 1905 (aged 25)	16	(Argentina) Talleres (RE)
	GK	Juan Botasso	23 October 1908 (aged 21)	2	(Argentina) Argentino de Quilmes
	FW	Roberto Cherro	23 February 1907 (aged 23)	10	(Argentina) Boca Juniors
	DF	Alberto Chividini	23 February 1907 (aged 23)	2	(Argentina) Central Norte
	FW	Attilio Demaría	19 March 1909 (aged 21)	0	(Argentina) Estudiantil Porteño
	DF	José Della Torre	23 March 1906 (aged 24)	0	(Argentina) Racing
	MF	Juan Evaristo	20 June 1902 (aged 28)	22	(Argentina) Sportivo Palermo
	FW	Mario Evaristo	10 December 1908 (aged 21)	6	(Argentina) Boca Juniors
	FW	Manuel Ferreira (captain)	22 October 1905 (aged 24)	18	(Argentina) Estudiantes de La Plata
	MF	Luis Monti	15 May 1901 (aged 29)	11	(Argentina) San Lorenzo
	DF	Ramón Muttis	12 March 1899 (aged 31)	10	(Argentina) Boca Juniors
	MF	Rodolfo Orlandini	1 January 1905 (aged 25)	8	(Argentina) Sportivo Buenos Aires
	DF	Fernando Paternoster	24 May 1903 (aged 27)	13	(Argentina) Racing
	FW	Natalio Perinetti	28 December 1900 (aged 29)	15	(Argentina) Racing
	FW	Carlos Peucelle	13 September 1908 (aged 21)	6	(Argentina) Sportivo Buenos Aires
	DF	Edmundo Piaggio	3 October 1905 (aged 24)	0	(Argentina) Lanús
	FW	Alejandro Scopelli	12 May 1908 (aged 22)	4	(Argentina) Estudiantes de La Plata
	FW	Carlos Spadaro	5 February 1902 (aged 28)	2	(Argentina) Lanús
	FW	Guillermo Stábile	17 January 1905 (aged 25)	0	(Argentina) Huracán
	MF	Arico Suárez	5 June 1908 (aged 22)	0	(Argentina) Boca Juniors
	FW	Francisco Varallo	5 February 1910 (aged 20)	1	(Argentina) Gimnasia y Esgrima La Plata
	MF	Adolfo Zumelzú	5 January 1902 (aged 28)	13	(Argentina) Sportivo Palermo

=== Chile ===
Head coach: (Hungary) György Orth

No.	Pos.	Player	Date of birth (age)	Caps	Club
	FW	Juan Aguilera	23 October 1903 (aged 26)	0	(Chile) Audax Italiano
	FW	Guillermo Arellano	21 August 1908 (aged 21)	0	(Chile) Colo-Colo
	DF	Ernesto Chaparro	4 January 1901 (aged 29)	3	(Chile) Colo-Colo
	MF	Arturo Coddou	14 January 1905 (aged 25)	0	(Chile) Lord Cochrane
	GK	Roberto Cortés	2 February 1905 (aged 25)	3	(Chile) Colo-Colo
	MF	Humberto Elgueta	10 September 1904 (aged 25)	9	(Chile) Santiago Wanderers
	GK	César Espinoza	31 May 1908 (aged 22)	0	(Chile) CD Santiago
	DF	Víctor Morales	10 May 1905 (aged 25)	8	(Chile) Colo-Colo
	DF	Horacio Muñoz	18 May 1896 (aged 34)	9	(Chile) Fernández Vial
	FW	Tomás Ojeda	20 April 1910 (aged 20)	0	(Chile) Boca Juniors Antofagasta
	DF	Ulises Poirier	2 February 1897 (aged 33)	14	(Chile) La Cruz
	DF	Guillermo Riveros	10 February 1902 (aged 28)	2	(Chile) La Cruz
	MF	Guillermo Saavedra	5 November 1903 (aged 26)	6	(Chile) Colo-Colo
	FW	Carlos Schneeberger (captain)	21 June 1902 (aged 28)	3	(Chile) Colo-Colo
	FW	Guillermo Subiabre	25 February 1903 (aged 27)	3	(Chile) Colo-Colo
	MF	Arturo Torres	20 October 1906 (aged 23)	3	(Chile) Colo-Colo
	MF	Casimiro Torres	4 March 1905 (aged 25)	0	(Chile) Everton
	FW	Carlos Vidal	22 February 1902 (aged 28)	0	(Chile) Federico Schwager
	FW	Eberardo Villalobos	1 April 1908 (aged 22)	0	(Chile) Rangers

=== France ===
Head coach: Raoul Caudron

No.	Pos.	Player	Date of birth (age)	Caps	Club
	DF	Numa Andoire	19 March 1908 (aged 22)	0	(France) Nice
	DF	Marcel Capelle	23 February 1904 (aged 26)	4	(France) RC Paris
	MF	Augustin Chantrel	8 July 1908 (aged 22)	8	(France) CASG Paris
	MF	Edmond Delfour	1 November 1907 (aged 22)	6	(France) RC Paris
	MF	Célestin Delmer	15 February 1907 (aged 23)	2	(France) Amiens
	FW	Marcel Langiller	2 June 1908 (aged 22)	8	(France) Excelsior Roubaix
	DF	Jean Laurent	30 December 1906 (aged 23)	3	(France) Sochaux
	FW	Lucien Laurent	10 December 1907 (aged 22)	2	(France) Sochaux
	FW	Ernest Libérati	22 March 1908 (aged 22)	3	(France) Amiens
	FW	André Maschinot	28 June 1903 (aged 27)	3	(France) Sochaux
	DF	Étienne Mattler	25 December 1905 (aged 24)	1	(France) Sochaux
	FW	Marcel Pinel	8 July 1908 (aged 22)	3	(France) Red Star
	GK	André Tassin	23 February 1902 (aged 28)	0	(France) RC Paris
	GK	Alex Thépot	30 July 1906 (aged 23)	12	(France) Red Star
	FW	Émile Veinante	12 June 1907 (aged 23)	3	(France) RC Paris
	MF	Alexandre Villaplane (captain)	24 December 1904 (aged 25)	22	(France) RC Paris

=== Mexico ===
Head coach: (Spain) Juan Luque de Serrallonga

No.	Pos.	Player	Date of birth (age)	Caps	Club
	MF	Efraín Amézcua	3 August 1907 (aged 22)	0	(Mexico) Atlante
	GK	Óscar Bonfiglio	5 October 1905 (aged 24)	2	(Mexico) Marte
	FW	Juan Carreño	14 August 1907 (aged 22)	2	(Mexico) Atlante
	FW	Jesús Castro	16 October 1908 (aged 21)	0	Deportivo Mexico
	DF	Rafael Garza (captain)	13 December 1896 (aged 33)	5	(Mexico) Club América
	DF	Francisco Garza	14 March 1904 (aged 26)	0	(Mexico) Club América
	FW	Roberto Gayón	1 January 1905 (aged 25)	0	(Mexico) Club América
	FW	Hilario López	18 November 1907 (aged 22)	0	(Mexico) Marte
	FW	Dionisio Mejía	6 January 1907 (aged 23)	1	(Mexico) Atlante
	FW	Felipe Olivares	5 February 1905 (aged 25)	0	(Mexico) Atlante
	FW	Luis Pérez	25 August 1906 (aged 23)	0	(Mexico) Necaxa
	MF	Raymundo Rodríguez	15 April 1905 (aged 25)	0	(Mexico) Marte
	MF	Felipe Rosas	5 February 1910 (aged 20)	0	(Mexico) Atlante
	DF	Manuel Rosas	17 April 1912 (aged 18)	0	(Mexico) Atlante
	FW	José Ruíz	1904 (aged 25–26)	0	(Mexico) Necaxa
	MF	Alfredo Sánchez	28 May 1904 (aged 26)	0	(Mexico) Club América
	GK	Isidoro Sota	4 February 1902 (aged 28)	0	(Mexico) Club América

== Group 2 ==
=== Yugoslavia ===
Head coach: Boško Simonović

No.	Pos.	Player	Date of birth (age)	Caps	Club
	MF	Milorad Arsenijević	6 June 1906 (aged 24)	16	(Kingdom of Yugoslavia) BSK Beograd
	FW	Ivan Bek	29 October 1909 (aged 20)	2	(France) Sète
	MF	Momčilo Đokić	27 February 1911 (aged 19)	2	(Kingdom of Yugoslavia) SK Jugoslavija
	MF	Branislav Hrnjiček	5 June 1908 (aged 22)	4	(Kingdom of Yugoslavia) SK Jugoslavija
	DF	Milutin Ivković (captain)	3 March 1906 (aged 24)	22	(Kingdom of Yugoslavia) SK Soko
	GK	Milovan Jakšić	21 September 1909 (aged 20)	2	(Kingdom of Yugoslavia) SK Soko
	FW	Blagoje Marjanović	9 September 1907 (aged 22)	15	(Kingdom of Yugoslavia) BSK Beograd
	FW	Božidar Marković	19 January 1910 (aged 20)	0	(Kingdom of Yugoslavia) SK Vojvodina
	DF	Dragoslav Mihajlović	13 December 1906 (aged 23)	1	(Kingdom of Yugoslavia) BSK Beograd
	FW	Dragutin Najdanović	15 April 1908 (aged 22)	3	(Kingdom of Yugoslavia) BSK Beograd
	FW	Branislav Sekulić	29 October 1906 (aged 23)	3	(France) Club Français
	MF	Teofilo Spasojević	21 January 1909 (aged 21)	1	(Kingdom of Yugoslavia) SK Jugoslavija
	MF	Ljubiša Stefanović	4 January 1910 (aged 20)	0	(France) Sète
	GK	Milan Stojanović	28 December 1911 (aged 18)	0	(Kingdom of Yugoslavia) BSK Beograd
	FW	Aleksandar Tirnanić	15 July 1910 (aged 19)	5	(Kingdom of Yugoslavia) BSK Beograd
	DF	Dragomir Tošić	8 November 1909 (aged 20)	0	(Kingdom of Yugoslavia) BSK Beograd
	FW	Đorđe Vujadinović	29 November 1909 (aged 20)	4	(Kingdom of Yugoslavia) BSK Beograd

=== Brazil ===
Head coach: Píndaro

No.	Pos.	Player	Date of birth (age)	Caps	Club
	FW	Araken	17 July 1905 (aged 24)	0	(Brazil) Flamengo*
	FW	Benedicto	30 October 1906 (aged 23)	0	(Brazil) Botafogo
	DF	Brilhante	5 November 1904 (aged 25)	0	(Brazil) Vasco da Gama
	FW	Carvalho Leite	25 June 1912 (aged 18)	0	(Brazil) Botafogo
	DF	Fausto	28 January 1905 (aged 25)	0	(Brazil) Vasco da Gama
	MF	Fernando	1 March 1906 (aged 24)	0	(Brazil) Fluminense
	MF	Fortes	9 September 1901 (aged 28)	13	(Brazil) Fluminense
	DF	Hermógenes	4 November 1908 (aged 21)	0	(Brazil) America-RJ
	DF	Itália	22 May 1907 (aged 23)	0	(Brazil) Vasco da Gama
	MF	Ivan Mariz	16 January 1910 (aged 20)	0	(Brazil) Fluminense
	GK	Joel	1 May 1904 (aged 26)	0	(Brazil) America-RJ
	FW	Manoelzinho	22 August 1907 (aged 22)	0	(Brazil) Ypiranga-RJ
	FW	Moderato	14 July 1902 (aged 27)	4	(Brazil) Flamengo
	FW	Nilo	3 April 1903 (aged 27)	10	(Brazil) Botafogo
	MF	Oscarino	17 January 1907 (aged 23)	0	(Brazil) Ypiranga-RJ
	MF	Pamplona	24 March 1904 (aged 26)	2	(Brazil) Botafogo
	FW	Poly	21 December 1907 (aged 22)	0	(Brazil) Americano (RJ)
	FW	Preguinho (captain)	8 February 1905 (aged 25)	0	(Brazil) Fluminense
	FW	Russinho	18 December 1902 (aged 27)	0	(Brazil) Vasco da Gama
	FW	Teóphilo	11 April 1900 (aged 30)	0	(Brazil) São Cristóvão
	GK	Velloso	25 September 1908 (aged 21)	0	(Brazil) Fluminense
	DF	Zé Luiz	16 November 1904 (aged 25)	0	(Brazil) São Cristóvão

- Notes
  - Players Doca (São Cristóvão) and Benevenuto (Flamengo) traveled with the team but were not registered because the competition rules in article 5 only allowed 22 players for squad.
  - Araken never played for Flamengo. He was registered as a club athlete just as a matter of formality, since APEA (São Paulo) was in a power struggle over command of Brazilian football with the CBD, situated in Rio de Janeiro.

=== Bolivia ===
Head coach: Ulises Saucedo

No.	Pos.	Player	Date of birth (age)	Caps	Club
	FW	Mario Alborta	19 September 1910 (aged 19)	7	(Bolivia) Club Bolivar
	MF	Juan Argote	6 January 1907 (aged 23)	0	(Bolivia) Oruro Royal
	GK	Jesús Bermúdez	24 January 1902 (aged 28)	6	(Bolivia) Oruro Royal
	MF	Miguel Brito	13 June 1901 (aged 29)	0	(Bolivia) Oruro Royal
	FW	José Bustamante	1907 (aged 22–23)	7	(Bolivia) Bolívar Nimbles
	DF	Casiano Chavarría	3 August 1901 (aged 28)	6	(Bolivia) Calavera La Paz
	DF	Segundo Durandal	17 March 1912 (aged 18)	0	(Bolivia) Club San José
	FW	René Fernández	1 January 1906 (aged 24)	0	(Bolivia) Alianza Oruro
	FW	Gumercindo Gómez	21 January 1907 (aged 23)	0	(Bolivia) Oruro Royal
	MF	Diógenes Lara	6 April 1903 (aged 27)	7	(Bolivia) Club Bolivar
	FW	Rafael Méndez (captain)	1904 (aged 25–26)	7	(Bolivia) Universitario de La Paz
	GK	Miguel Murillo	24 March 1898 (aged 32)	0	(Bolivia) Club Bolivar
	MF	Constantino Noya	Unknown	0	(Bolivia) Oruro Royal
	FW	Eduardo Reyes Ortiz	1 January 1907 (aged 23)	0	(Bolivia) The Strongest
	DF	Luis Reyes	5 June 1911 (aged 19)	0	(Bolivia) Universitario de La Paz
	MF	Renato Sáinz	14 December 1899 (aged 30)	5	(Bolivia) The Strongest
	MF	Jorge Valderrama	12 December 1906 (aged 23)	5	(Bolivia) Oruro Royal

== Group 3 ==
=== Uruguay ===
Head coach: Alberto Suppici

No.	Pos.	Player	Date of birth (age)	Caps	Club
	MF	José Leandro Andrade	22 November 1901 (aged 28)	30	(Uruguay) Nacional
	FW	Peregrino Anselmo	30 April 1902 (aged 28)	8	(Uruguay) Peñarol
	GK	Enrique Ballestrero	18 January 1905 (aged 25)	1	(Uruguay) Rampla Juniors
	FW	Juan Carlos Calvo	26 June 1906 (aged 24)	-	(Uruguay) Miramar Misiones
	GK	Miguel Capuccini	5 January 1904 (aged 26)	6	(Uruguay) Peñarol
	FW	Héctor Castro	29 November 1904 (aged 25)	17	(Uruguay) Nacional
	FW	Pedro Cea	1 September 1900 (aged 29)	21	(Uruguay) Nacional
	FW	Pablo Dorado	22 June 1908 (aged 22)	2	(Uruguay) Bella Vista
	MF	Lorenzo Fernández	20 May 1900 (aged 30)	20	(Uruguay) Peñarol
	MF	Álvaro Gestido	17 May 1907 (aged 23)	10	(Uruguay) Peñarol
	FW	Santos Iriarte	2 November 1902 (aged 27)	-	(Uruguay) Racing Club
	DF	Ernesto Mascheroni	21 November 1907 (aged 22)	-	(Uruguay) Olimpia
	MF	Ángel Melogno	22 March 1905 (aged 25)	5	(Uruguay) Bella Vista
	DF	José Nasazzi (captain)	24 March 1901 (aged 29)	28	(Uruguay) Bella Vista
	FW	Pedro Petrone	11 May 1905 (aged 25)	28	(Uruguay) Nacional
	MF	Conduelo Píriz	17 June 1905 (aged 25)	7	(Uruguay) Nacional
	DF	Emilio Recoba	3 November 1904 (aged 25)	5	(Uruguay) Nacional
	MF	Carlos Riolfo	5 November 1905 (aged 24)	2	(Uruguay) Peñarol
	FW	Zoilo Saldombide	26 October 1903 (aged 26)	14	(Uruguay) Nacional
	FW	Héctor Scarone	26 November 1898 (aged 31)	49	(Uruguay) Nacional
	DF	Domingo Tejera	22 July 1899 (aged 30)	15	(Uruguay) Montevideo Wanderers
	FW	Santos Urdinarán	30 March 1900 (aged 30)	19	(Uruguay) Nacional

=== Romania ===
Head coach: Constantin Rădulescu

No.	Pos.	Player	Date of birth (age)	Caps	Club
	FW	Ștefan Barbu	2 March 1908 (aged 22)	4	(Romania) Gloria Arad
	DF	Rudolf Bürger	31 October 1908 (aged 21)	4	(Romania) Chinezul Timișoara
	DF	Iosif Czako	11 June 1906 (aged 24)	1	(Romania) Banatul Timișoara
	FW	Adalbert Deșu	24 March 1909 (aged 21)	4	(Romania) Banatul Timișoara
	MF	Alfred Eisenbeisser	7 April 1908 (aged 22)	0	(Romania) Dragoș Vodă Cernăuți
	FW	Nicolae Kovács	29 December 1911 (aged 18)	3	(Romania) Banatul Timișoara
	GK	Ion Lăpușneanu	8 December 1908 (aged 21)	3	(Romania) Sportul Studențesc
	MF	László Raffinsky	23 April 1905 (aged 25)	4	(Romania) Juventus București
	MF	Corneliu Robe	23 May 1908 (aged 22)	0	(Romania) Olympia București
	FW	Constantin Stanciu	24 September 1907 (aged 22)	4	(Romania) Venus București
	DF	Adalbert Steiner	24 January 1907 (aged 23)	9	(Romania) CA Timișoara
	FW	Ilie Subășeanu	6 June 1906 (aged 24)	2	(Romania) Olympia București
	DF	Emerich Vogl	12 August 1905 (aged 24)	10	(Romania) Juventus București
	FW	Rudolf Wetzer (captain)	17 March 1901 (aged 29)	12	(Romania) Juventus București
	GK	Samuel Zauber	9 January 1901 (aged 29)	0	(Romania) Maccabi București

=== Peru ===
Head coach: (Spain) Francisco Bru

No.	Pos.	Player	Date of birth (age)	Caps	Club
	MF	Eduardo Astengo	26 June 1909 (aged 21)	3	(Peru) Universitario de Deportes
	MF	Carlos Cillóniz	1 July 1910 (aged 20)	0	(Peru) Universitario de Deportes
	DF	Mario de las Casas	31 January 1901 (aged 29)	0	(Peru) Lawn Tennis
	MF	Alberto Denegri	7 August 1906 (aged 23)	3	(Peru) Universitario de Deportes
	DF	Arturo Fernández	3 February 1910 (aged 20)	0	(Peru) Universitario de Deportes
	MF	Plácido Galindo (captain)	9 March 1906 (aged 24)	1	(Peru) Universitario de Deportes
	MF	Domingo García	30 November 1904 (aged 25)	0	(Peru) Alianza Lima
	FW	José María Lavalle	5 June 1911 (aged 19)	3	(Peru) Alianza Lima
	FW	Julio Lores	15 September 1908 (aged 21)	0	(Mexico) Necaxa
	DF	Antonio Maquilón	29 November 1902 (aged 27)	5	(Peru) Tarapacá Ferroviario
	FW	Demetrio Neyra	15 December 1908 (aged 21)	2	(Peru) Alianza Lima
	FW	Pablo Pacheco	22 June 1908 (aged 22)	0	(Peru) Universitario de Deportes
	GK	Jorge Pardon	4 March 1905 (aged 25)	6	(Peru) Sporting Tabaco
	MF	Julio Quintana	13 July 1904 (aged 26)	0	(Peru) Alianza Lima
	FW	Lizardo Rodríguez Nue	30 August 1910 (aged 19)	0	(Peru) Sport Progreso
	FW	Jorge Sarmiento	2 November 1900 (aged 29)	2	(Peru) Alianza Lima
	DF	Alberto Soria	10 March 1906 (aged 24)	0	(Peru) Alianza Lima
	FW	Luis de Souza	6 October 1908 (aged 21)	0	(Peru) Universitario de Deportes
	GK	Juan Valdivieso	6 May 1910 (aged 20)	0	(Peru) Alianza Lima
	FW	Alejandro Villanueva	4 June 1908 (aged 22)	2	(Peru) Alianza Lima

== Group 4 ==
=== United States ===
Head coach: (Scotland) Robert Millar

No.	Pos.	Player	Date of birth (age)	Caps	Club
	MF	Andy Auld	30 April 1900 (aged 30)	1	(United States) Providence
	FW	Mike Bookie	12 September 1904 (aged 25)	0	(United States) Cleveland Slavia
	FW	Jim Brown	31 December 1908 (aged 21)	3	(United States) New York Giants
	GK	Jimmy Douglas	12 January 1898 (aged 32)	5	(United States) New York Nationals
	FW	Tom Florie (captain)	6 September 1897 (aged 32)	2	(United States) New Bedford Whalers
	MF	Jimmy Gallagher	7 June 1901 (aged 29)	2	(United States) New York Nationals
	FW	James Gentle	21 July 1904 (aged 25)	0	(United States) Philadelphia Field Club
	FW	Billy Gonsalves	10 August 1908 (aged 21)	0	(United States) Fall River
	FW	Bart McGhee	30 April 1899 (aged 31)	0	(United States) New York Nationals
	DF	George Moorhouse	4 April 1901 (aged 29)	1	(United States) New York Giants
	FW	Arnie Oliver	22 May 1907 (aged 23)	0	(United States) Lucitania Recreation
	FW	Bert Patenaude	4 November 1909 (aged 20)	0	(United States) Fall River
	MF	Philip Slone	20 January 1907 (aged 23)	0	(United States) New York Giants
	FW	Raphael Tracey	6 February 1904 (aged 26)	0	(United States) Ben Millers
	DF	Frank Vaughn	18 February 1902 (aged 28)	0	(United States) Ben Millers
	DF	Alexander Wood	12 June 1907 (aged 23)	0	(United States) Detroit Holley Carburetor

=== Paraguay ===
Head coach: (Argentina) José Durand Laguna

No.	Pos.	Player	Date of birth (age)	Caps	Club
	MF	Francisco Aguirre	30 November 1907 (aged 22)	0	(Paraguay) Olimpia
	GK	Pedro Benítez	12 January 1901 (aged 29)	0	(Paraguay) Libertad
	MF	Santiago Benítez	1906(aged 23–25)	0	(Paraguay) Olimpia
	FW	Delfín Benítez Cáceres	24 September 1910 (aged 19)	0	(Paraguay) Libertad
	FW	Saguier Carreras	Unknown	?	(Paraguay) Sportivo Luqueño
	DF	Eustacio Chamorro	Unknown	?	(Paraguay) Presidente Hayes
	GK	Modesto Denis	15 June 1898 (aged 32)	0	(Paraguay) Nacional
	MF	Eusebio Díaz	21 June 1898 (aged 32)	0	(Paraguay) Guaraní
	FW	Diógenes Domínguez	1902 (aged 27–28)	0	(Paraguay) Sportivo Luqueño
	MF	Romildo Etcheverry	15 November 1906 (aged 23)	0	(Paraguay) Olimpia
	MF	Diego Florentín	Unknown	?	(Paraguay) River Plate
	DF	Salvador Flores	1906 (aged 23–24)	0	(Paraguay) Cerro Porteño
	MF	Tranquilino Garcete	1907 (aged 22–23)	0	(Paraguay) Libertad
	FW	Aurelio González	25 September 1905 (aged 24)	0	(Paraguay) Olimpia
	DF	José Miracca	23 September 1903 (aged 26)	0	(Paraguay) Nacional
	FW	Lino Nessi	23 September 1905 (aged 24)	0	(Paraguay) Libertad
	DF	Quiterio Olmedo	22 May 1901 (aged 29)	0	(Paraguay) Nacional
	FW	Amadeo Ortega	Unknown	0	(Paraguay) River Plate
	FW	Bernabé Rivera	Unknown	0	(Paraguay) Sportivo Luqueño
	FW	Gerardo Romero	30 November 1905 (aged 24)	0	(Paraguay) Libertad
	FW	Luis Vargas Peña (captain)	23 April 1905 (aged 25)	0	(Paraguay) Olimpia
	FW	Jacinto Villalba	19 September 1914 (aged 15)	?	(Paraguay) Cerro Porteño

=== Belgium ===
Head coach: Hector Goetinck

No.	Pos.	Player	Date of birth (age)	Caps	Club
	FW	Ferdinand Adams	3 May 1903 (aged 27)	21	(Belgium) Anderlecht
	GK	Arnold Badjou	25 June 1909 (aged 21)	3	(Belgium) Daring Club
	MF	Pierre Braine (captain)	26 October 1900 (aged 29)	42	(Belgium) Beerschot
	MF	Alexis Chantraine	16 March 1901 (aged 29)	0	(Belgium) RFC Liège
	GK	Jean De Bie	9 May 1892 (aged 38)	37	(Belgium) Racing Bruxelles
	MF	Jean De Clercq	17 May 1905 (aged 25)	5	(Belgium) Antwerp
	DF	Henri De Deken	3 August 1907 (aged 22)	0	(Belgium) Antwerp
	MF	Gérard Delbeke	1 August 1898 (aged 31)	0	(Belgium) FC Brugeois
	FW	Jan Diddens	14 September 1906 (aged 23)	21	(Belgium) RC de Malines
	MF	August Hellemans	21 June 1907 (aged 23)	4	(Belgium) RFC Malinois
	DF	Nicolas Hoydonckx	29 December 1900 (aged 29)	19	(Belgium) FC Excelsior Hasselt
	FW	Jacques Moeschal	6 September 1900 (aged 29)	15	(Belgium) Racing Bruxelles
	DF	Théodore Nouwens	17 February 1908 (aged 22)	10	(Belgium) RC de Malines
	FW	André Saeys	20 February 1911 (aged 19)	0	(Belgium) CS Brugeois
	FW	Louis Versyp	5 December 1908 (aged 21)	7	(Belgium) FC Brugeois
	FW	Bernard Voorhoof	10 May 1910 (aged 20)	6	(Belgium) Liersche

- NB*: Rosters include reserves, alternates, and preselected players that may have participated or pre-tournament friendlies but not in the finals themselves.

== Coaches representation by country ==
No.	Country	Coaches
3	Argentina	José Durand Laguna (Paraguay), Francisco Olazar, Juan José Tramutola
2	Spain	Francisco Bru (Peru), Juan Luque de Serrallonga (Mexico)
1	Belgium	Hector Goetinck
1	Bolivia	Ulises Saucedo
1	Brazil	Píndaro
1	France	Raoul Caudron
1	Hungary	György Orth (Chile)
1	Romania	Constantin Rădulescu
1	Scotland	Robert Millar (United States)
1	Uruguay	Alberto Suppici
1	(Kingdom of Yugoslavia) Yugoslavia	Boško Simonović
