= 1930 FIFA World Cup Group 4 =

Football tournament group stage

Group 4 of the 1930 FIFA World Cup began on 13 July 1930 and concluded on 20 July 1930. United States won the group, and advanced to the semi-finals. Paraguay and Belgium failed to advance.

The United States started out by defeating Belgium 3–0 in the joint-opening World Cup match. They then beat Paraguay by the same score with the first ever World Cup hat-trick. The final match decided second place in which Paraguay won 1–0.

== Standings ==
Pos	Team	Pld	W	D	L	GF	GA	GD	Pts	Qualification
1	United States	2	2	0	0	6	0	+6	4	Advance to the knockout stage
2	Paraguay	2	1	0	1	1	3	−2	2	
3	Belgium	2	0	0	2	0	4	−4	0	

Source: ESPN

== Matches ==
=== United States vs Belgium ===
13 July 1930
15:00 UYT (UTC−03:30)

United States	3–0	Belgium
McGhee 23' (Note: This is one of several goals for which the statistical details are disputed. The goalscorers and timings used here are those of FIFA, the official record. Some other sources, such as RSSSF, state a different scorer, timing, or both.); Florie 45'; Patenaude 69'

Estadio Parque Central, Montevideo
Attendance: 18,346
Referee: José Macías (Argentina)

United States
Belgium

GK	Jimmy Douglas
DF	Alexander Wood
DF	George Moorhouse
HB	Jimmy Gallagher
HB	Raphael Tracey
HB	Andy Auld
FW	Jim Brown
FW	Billy Gonsalves
FW	Bert Patenaude
FW	Tom Florie (c)
FW	Bart McGhee
Manager:
Robert Millar

GK	Arnold Badjou
DF	Theodore Nouwens
DF	Nic Hoydonckx
HB	Pierre Braine (c)
HB	August Hellemans
HB	Jean De Clercq
FW	Louis Versyp
FW	Bernard Voorhoof
FW	Ferdinand Adams
FW	Jacques Moeschal
FW	Jan Diddens
Manager:
Hector Goetinck

Linesmen:
Francisco Mateucci (Uruguay)
Alberto Warnken (Chile)

=== United States vs Paraguay ===
17 July 1930
14:45 UYT (UTC−03:30)

United States	3–0	Paraguay
Patenaude 10', 15', 50' (Note: FIFA initially credited the goal in the 15th minute to Tom Florie, but changed it to Patenaude in 2006. During previous years, it was also listed as an own goal by Aurelio González.)

Estadio Parque Central, Montevideo
Attendance: 18,306
Referee: José Macías (Argentina)

United States
Paraguay

GK	Jimmy Douglas
DF	Alexander Wood
DF	George Moorhouse
HB	Jimmy Gallagher
HB	Raphael Tracey
HB	Andy Auld
FW	Jim Brown
FW	Billy Gonsalves
FW	Bert Patenaude
FW	Tom Florie (c)
FW	Bart McGhee
Manager:
Robert Millar

GK	Modesto Denis
DF	José Miracca
DF	Quiterio Olmedo
HB	Romildo Etcheverry
HB	Eusebio Díaz
HB	Francisco Aguirre
FW	Lino Nessi
FW	Diógenes Domínguez
FW	Aurelio González
FW	Delfín Benítez Cáceres
FW	Luis Vargas Peña (c)
Manager:
(Argentina) José Durand Laguna

Linesmen:
Martin Aphesteguy (Uruguay)
Anibal Tejada (Uruguay)

=== Paraguay vs Belgium ===
20 July 1930
15:00 UYT (UTC−03:30)

Paraguay	1–0	Belgium
Vargas Peña 40'

Estadio Centenario, Montevideo
Attendance: 12,000
Referee: Ricardo Vallarino (Uruguay)

Paraguay
Belgium

GK	Pedro Benítez
DF	Salvador Flores
DF	Quiterio Olmedo
HB	Santiago Benítez
HB	Eusebio Díaz
HB	Tranquilino Garcete
FW	Aurelio González
FW	Delfín Benítez Cáceres
FW	Gerardo Romero
FW	Lino Nessi
FW	Luis Vargas Peña (c)
Manager:
(Argentina) José Durand Laguna

GK	Arnold Badjou
DF	Henri De Deken
DF	Nic Hoydonckx
DF	Theodore Nouwens
HB	Pierre Braine (c)
HB	August Hellemans
FW	Ferdinand Adams
FW	Gérard Delbeke
FW	Jan Diddens
FW	Jacques Moeschal
FW	Louis Versyp
Manager:
Hector Goetinck

Linesmen:
José Macías (Argentina)
Domingo Lombardi (Uruguay)

== See also ==
- Belgium at the FIFA World Cup
- Paraguay at the FIFA World Cup
- United States at the FIFA World Cup
