= List of FIFA World Cup top goalscorers =

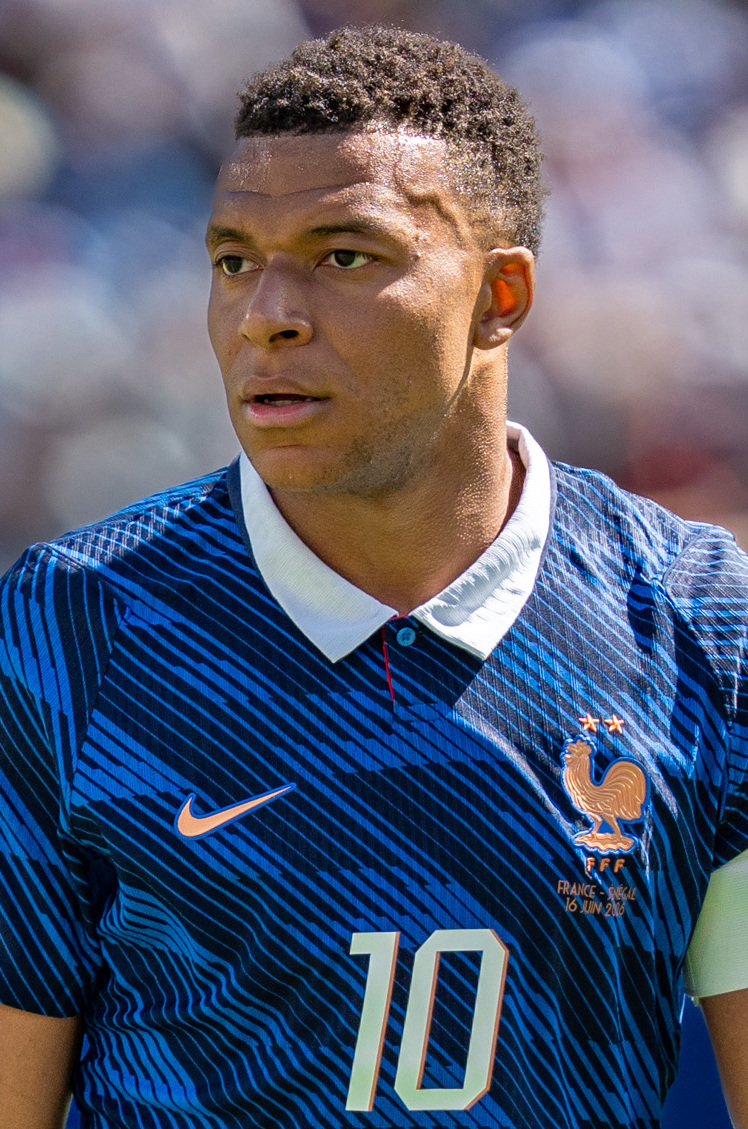
Kylian Mbappé holds the record at 22 goals.

Players have scored more than 3,000 goals in the 23 men's FIFA World Cup tournaments, the goal record includes own goals scored, but not counting penalty shoot-outs. Since the first goal, by French player Lucien Laurent in 1930, nearly 1,300 footballers have scored goals at the World Cup tournaments, of whom 111 have scored five or more.

Numbers of goals scored
Goals	≥11	10	9	8	7	6	5	4	3	2	1	Total
Nos. of players	11	6	11	8	9	27	39	>60	>120	>220	>750	>1,250

The top goalscorer of the inaugural competition was Argentina's Guillermo Stábile, with eight goals. Since then, only 28 players have scored more World Cup goals in total than Stábile did during the 1930 tournament. The first to do so was Brazil's Ademir in 1950, with nine goals. This was followed by Hungary's Sándor Kocsis scoring eleven in 1954. At the 1958 tournament, France's Just Fontaine further improved on this record, recording thirteen goals in just six matches. Gerd Müller then scored ten goals for West Germany in 1970, before breaking the overall record when he scored his fourteenth World Cup goal during West Germany's win in the 1974 final. Müller's record stood for more than three decades, until Ronaldo recorded fifteen goals between 1998 and 2006 for Brazil. Germany's Miroslav Klose broke Ronaldo's record with his 16th goal in 2014; his record stood until Argentina's Lionel Messi scored his 17th through 21st goals in 2026. At the same World Cup, France's Kylian Mbappé became the current record holder after scoring his 22nd goal.

Of all the players who have played at the World Cup, only six have achieved an average of two goals or more per match played: Kocsis, Fontaine, Stábile, Russia's Oleg Salenko, Switzerland's Josef Hügi, and Poland's Ernst Wilimowski – the latter of whom scored four in his only ever World Cup match, played in 1938. The top 111 goalscorers have represented 31 nations, with 15 players scoring for both Brazil and Germany or West Germany. In total, 75 footballers came from UEFA (Europe), 31 from CONMEBOL (South America), and only five from elsewhere: Cameroon, Ghana and Senegal from CAF (Africa), Australia from AFC (Asia) (formerly from OFC of Oceania), and the United States from CONCACAF (North/Central America).

Fontaine's thirteen goals in 1958 remains the record for the most scored in a single World Cup tournament. The players that came closest to this tally were Kocsis in 1954 (eleven goals), Müller in 1970 (ten goals), Mbappé in 2026 (ten goals), Brazil's Ademir in 1950 (nine goals) and Portugal's Eusébio in 1966 (nine goals). The top scorers with the fewest goals were from the 1962 tournament, when six players finished joint-top with four goals each. Across the 23 tournaments of the World Cup, 31 footballers have been credited as the tournament top scorer; Mbappé is the only player to achieve this feat twice, in 2022 and 2026. Ten of these players scored at least seven goals in a tournament, while Brazil's Jairzinho in 1970, Argentina's Lionel Messi in 2022 and 2026, and England's Jude Bellingham and Norway's Erling Haaland in 2026 were the only footballers to record at least seven goals but still not finish as the tournament's top scorer. These 31 top goalscorers played for 19 nations, with the most (five) coming from Brazil. Another five came from other South American countries, with the remaining 21 coming from Europe.

Brazil's Leônidas became the first player to score eight goals in knockout matches across his 1934 and 1938 World Cup appearances, a feat that was surpassed by Mbappé in 2026 with a total of twelve (including eight from the previous 2018 and 2022 tournaments). Mbappé became the first player to score four goals in World Cup final matches: he netted one in the 2018 final followed by a hat-trick in the 2022 final. England's Geoff Hurst is the only other player to record a hat-trick in a World Cup final, doing so in 1966.

== Overall top goalscorers ==
As of 19 July 2026.

Table key
Bold (player)	Denotes players still active at international level
♦	Denotes national top scorers (or joint top scorers) at the World Cup
[ ]	Denotes tournaments where the player was part of the squad, but did not play in a match
( )	Denotes tournaments where the player played in one or more matches, but did not score a goal
Bold (year)	Denotes tournaments where the player's team won the World Cup
T	Denotes tournaments where the player was top scorer

Players with at least 5 goals at FIFA World Cup tournaments
Rank	Player	Team	Goals scored	Matches played	Goals per match (Note: Outside this list is Ernst Wilimowski of Poland, the player with the highest goals-to-games ratio in the World Cup. His ratio is 4.00 as he scored four goals in his only World Cup appearance, in 1938.)	Tournaments	Notes
1	Kylian Mbappé^{♦}	France	22	22	1.00	2018, 2022^{T}, 2026^{T}	list
2	Lionel Messi^{♦}	Argentina	21	34	0.62	2006, (2010), 2014, 2018, 2022, 2026	list
3	Miroslav Klose^{♦}	Germany	16	24	0.67	2002, 2006^{T}, 2010, 2014	list
4	Ronaldo^{♦}	Brazil	15	19	0.79	[1994], 1998, 2002^{T}, 2006	list
5	Gerd Müller	West Germany	14	13	1.08	1970^{T}, 1974	list
5	Harry Kane^{♦}	England	14	18	0.78	2018^{T}, 2022, 2026	list
7	Just Fontaine	France	13	6	2.17	1958^{T}	list
8	Pelé	Brazil	12	14	0.86	1958, 1962, 1966, 1970	list
9	Sándor Kocsis^{♦}	Hungary	11	5	2.20	1954^{T}	list
9	Jürgen Klinsmann	West Germany; Germany	11	17	0.65	1990; 1994, 1998	list
9	Cristiano Ronaldo^{♦}	Portugal	11	27	0.41	2006, 2010, 2014, 2018, 2022, 2026	list
12	Helmut Rahn	West Germany	10	10	1.00	1954, 1958	list
12	Gary Lineker	England	10	12	0.83	1986^{T}, 1990	list
12	Gabriel Batistuta	Argentina	10	12	0.83	1994, 1998, 2002	list
12	Teófilo Cubillas^{♦}	Peru	10	13	0.77	1970, 1978, (1982)	list
12	Thomas Müller	Germany	10	19	0.53	2010^{T}, 2014, (2018), (2022)	list
12	Grzegorz Lato^{♦}	Poland	10	20	0.50	1974^{T}, 1978, 1982	list
18	Ademir	Brazil	9	6	1.50	1950^{T}	list (Note: There was a controversy regarding the number of goals scored by Ademir in 1950 because of incomplete data from the final group round game against Spain, that ended in a 6–1 victory for Brazil. The first Brazilian goal was credited as own goal and the fifth was credited to Jair, but both are now credited to Ademir.)
18	Eusébio	Portugal	9	6	1.50	1966^{T}	list
18	Christian Vieri^{♦}	Italy	9	9	1.00	1998, 2002	list
18	Vavá	Brazil	9	10	0.90	1958, 1962^{T}	
18	David Villa^{♦}	Spain	9	12	0.75	2006, 2010^{T}, 2014	list
18	Paolo Rossi^{♦}	Italy	9	14	0.64	1978, 1982^{T}, [1986]	list
18	Neymar	Brazil	9	15	0.60	2014, 2018, 2022, 2026	list
18	Jairzinho	Brazil	9	16	0.56	(1966), 1970, 1974	list
18	Roberto Baggio^{♦}	Italy	9	16	0.56	1990, 1994, 1998	list
18	Karl-Heinz Rummenigge	West Germany	9	19	0.47	1978, 1982, 1986	list
18	Uwe Seeler	West Germany	9	21	0.43	1958, 1962, 1966, 1970	
29	Guillermo Stábile	Argentina	8	4	2.00	1930^{T}	list
29	Leônidas	Brazil	8	5	1.60	1934, 1938^{T}	list (Note: FIFA initially credited Leônidas with eight goals in the 1938 tournament, but in November 2006, FIFA revised it to seven (he scored one additional goal in the 1934 tournament).)
29	Óscar Míguez^{♦}	Uruguay	8	7	1.14	1950, 1954	
29	Jude Bellingham	England	8	13	0.62	2022, 2026	list
29	Rivaldo	Brazil	8	14	0.57	1998, 2002	list
29	Rudi Völler	West Germany; Germany	8	15	0.53	1986, 1990; 1994	list
29	Romelu Lukaku^{♦}	Belgium	8	18	0.44	2014, 2018, (2022), 2026	list
29	Diego Maradona	Argentina	8	21	0.38	1982, 1986, (1990), 1994	list
37	Erling Haaland^{♦}	Norway	7	5	1.40	2026	list
37	Oldřich Nejedlý^{♦}	Czechoslovakia	7	6	1.17	1934^{T}, 1938	(Note: FIFA initially credited Nejedlý with only four goals in 1934. However, FIFA changed it to five goals in November 2006, meaning he scored a total of seven goals overall (he scored two goals in 1938).)
37	Lajos Tichy	Hungary	7	8	0.88	1958, 1962, [1966]	list
37	Careca	Brazil	7	9	0.78	1986, 1990	
37	Johnny Rep^{♦}	Netherlands	7	13	0.54	1974, 1978	
37	Andrzej Szarmach	Poland	7	13	0.54	1974, 1978, 1982	
37	Hans Schäfer	West Germany	7	15	0.47	1954, 1958, (1962)	
37	Luis Suárez	Uruguay	7	16	0.44	2010, 2014, 2018, (2022)	list
37	Ivan Perišić^{♦}	Croatia	7	21	0.33	2014, 2018, 2022, 2026	list
46	Josef Hügi^{♦}	Switzerland	6	3	2.00	1954	
46	Oleg Salenko^{♦}	Russia	6	3	2.00	1994^{T}	list
46	György Sárosi	Hungary	6	5	1.20	1934, 1938	
46	Max Morlock	West Germany	6	5	1.20	1954	
46	Erich Probst^{♦}	Austria	6	5	1.20	1954	
46	Salvatore Schillaci	Italy	6	7	0.86	1990^{T}	list
46	Davor Šuker	Yugoslavia; Croatia	6	8	0.75	[1990] 1998^{T}, (2002)	list
46	Helmut Haller	West Germany	6	9	0.67	(1962), 1966, (1970)	
46	Cody Gakpo	Netherlands	6	9	0.67	2022, 2026	list
46	Hristo Stoichkov^{♦}	Bulgaria	6	10	0.60	1994^{T}, (1998)	list
46	Diego Forlán	Uruguay	6	10	0.60	2002, 2010^{T}, (2014)	list
46	Enner Valencia^{♦}	Ecuador	6	10	0.60	2014, 2022, (2026)	list
46	Asamoah Gyan^{♦}	Ghana	6	11	0.55	2006, 2010, 2014	list
46	Bukayo Saka	England	6	11	0.55	2022, 2026	list
46	Dennis Bergkamp	Netherlands	6	12	0.50	1994, 1998	list
46	Rob Rensenbrink	Netherlands	6	13	0.46	1974, 1978	
46	James Rodríguez^{♦}	Colombia	6	13	0.46	2014^{T}, (2018), (2026)	list
46	Rivellino	Brazil	6	15	0.40	1970, 1974, (1978)	
46	Bebeto	Brazil	6	15	0.40	(1990), 1994, 1998	list
46	Arjen Robben	Netherlands	6	15	0.40	2006, 2010, 2014	list
46	Zbigniew Boniek	Poland	6	16	0.38	1978, 1982, (1986)	list
46	Thierry Henry	France	6	17	0.35	1998, (2002), 2006, (2010)	list
46	Robin van Persie	Netherlands	6	17	0.35	2006, 2010, 2014	list
46	Wesley Sneijder	Netherlands	6	17	0.35	(2006), 2010^{T}, 2014	list
46	Mario Kempes	Argentina	6	18	0.33	(1974), 1978^{T}, (1982)	list
46	Ousmane Dembélé	France	6	19	0.32	(2018), (2022), 2026	list
46	Lothar Matthäus	West Germany; Germany	6	25	0.24	(1982), 1986, 1990; 1994, (1998)	list
73	Pedro Cea	Uruguay	5	4	1.25	1930	list
73	Silvio Piola	Italy	5	4	1.25	1938	list
73	Gyula Zsengellér	Hungary	5	4	1.25	1938	
73	Peter McParland^{♦}	Northern Ireland	5	5	1.00	1958	list
73	Tomáš Skuhravý	Czechoslovakia	5	5	1.00	1990	
73	Juan Alberto Schiaffino	Uruguay	5	6	0.83	1950, 1954	
73	Geoff Hurst	England	5	6	0.83	1966, 1970	list
73	Jon Dahl Tomasson^{♦}	Denmark	5	6	0.83	2002, 2010	list
73	Kai Havertz	Germany	5	6	0.83	2022, 2026	list
73	Alessandro Altobelli	Italy	5	7	0.71	1982, 1986	
73	Kennet Andersson^{♦}	Sweden	5	7	0.71	1994	list
73	Fernando Morientes	Spain	5	7	0.71	1998, 2002	list
73	Romário	Brazil	5	8	0.63	(1990), 1994	list
73	Marc Wilmots	Belgium	5	8	0.63	[1990], (1994), 1998, 2002	list
73	Mario Mandžukić	Croatia	5	8	0.63	2014, 2018	list
73	Mikel Oyarzabal	Spain	5	8	0.63	2026	list
73	Valentin Ivanov	Soviet Union	5	9	0.56	1958, 1962^{T}	list
73	Emilio Butragueño	Spain	5	9	0.56	1986, (1990)	list
73	Roger Milla^{♦}	Cameroon	5	9	0.56	(1982), 1990, 1994	list
73	Tim Cahill^{♦}	Australia	5	9	0.56	2006, 2010, 2014, (2018)	list
73	Vinícius Júnior	Brazil	5	9	0.56	2022, 2026	list
73	Hans Krankl	Austria	5	10	0.50	1978, 1982	list
73	Raúl	Spain	5	11	0.45	1998, 2002, 2006	list
73	Ismaïla Sarr^{♦}	Senegal	5	11	0.45	(2018), 2022, 2026	list
73	Garrincha	Brazil	5	12	0.42	(1958), 1962^{T}, 1966	
73	Johan Neeskens	Netherlands	5	12	0.42	1974, (1978)	
73	Fernando Hierro	Spain	5	12	0.42	[1990], 1994, 1998, 2002	list
73	Zinedine Zidane	France	5	12	0.42	1998, (2002), 2006	list
73	Landon Donovan^{♦}	United States	5	12	0.42	2002, (2006), 2010	list
73	Xherdan Shaqiri	Switzerland	5	12	0.42	(2010), 2014, 2018, 2022	list
73	Henrik Larsson^{♦}	Sweden	5	13	0.38	1994, 2002, 2006	list
73	Zico	Brazil	5	14	0.36	1978, 1982, (1986)	
73	Michel Platini	France	5	14	0.36	1978, 1982, 1986	list
73	Gonzalo Higuaín	Argentina	5	14	0.36	2010, 2014, (2018)	list
73	Lukas Podolski	Germany	5	15	0.33	2006, 2010, (2014)	list
73	Julián Alvarez	Argentina	5	15	0.33	2022, 2026	list
73	Edinson Cavani	Uruguay	5	17	0.29	2010, 2014, 2018, (2022)	list
73	Franz Beckenbauer	West Germany	5	18	0.28	1966, 1970, (1974)	list
73	Olivier Giroud	France	5	18	0.28	2014, (2018), 2022	list

=== Timeline ===
Note: FIFA recognizes a total of 10 players as having held the all-time World Cup goalscoring record (including jointly), counting from the end of the inaugural tournament in 1930 onwards. The years shown at the bottom indicate World Cup tournaments, except for 1942 and 1946, years in which no tournament was held.

Guillermo Stábile
Leônidas
Ademir
Sándor Kocsis
Just Fontaine
Gerd Müller
Ronaldo
Miroslav Klose
Lionel Messi
Kylian Mbappé
│
1930
│
1934
│
1938
│
1942
│
1946
│
1950
│
1954
│
1958
│
1962
│
1966
│
1970
│
1974
│
1978
│
1982
│
1986
│
1990
│
1994
│
1998
│
2002
│
2006
│
2010
│
2014
│
2018
│
2022
│
2026
│
2030
│
2034
│
2038
│
2042
Argentina Brazil Hungary France Germany
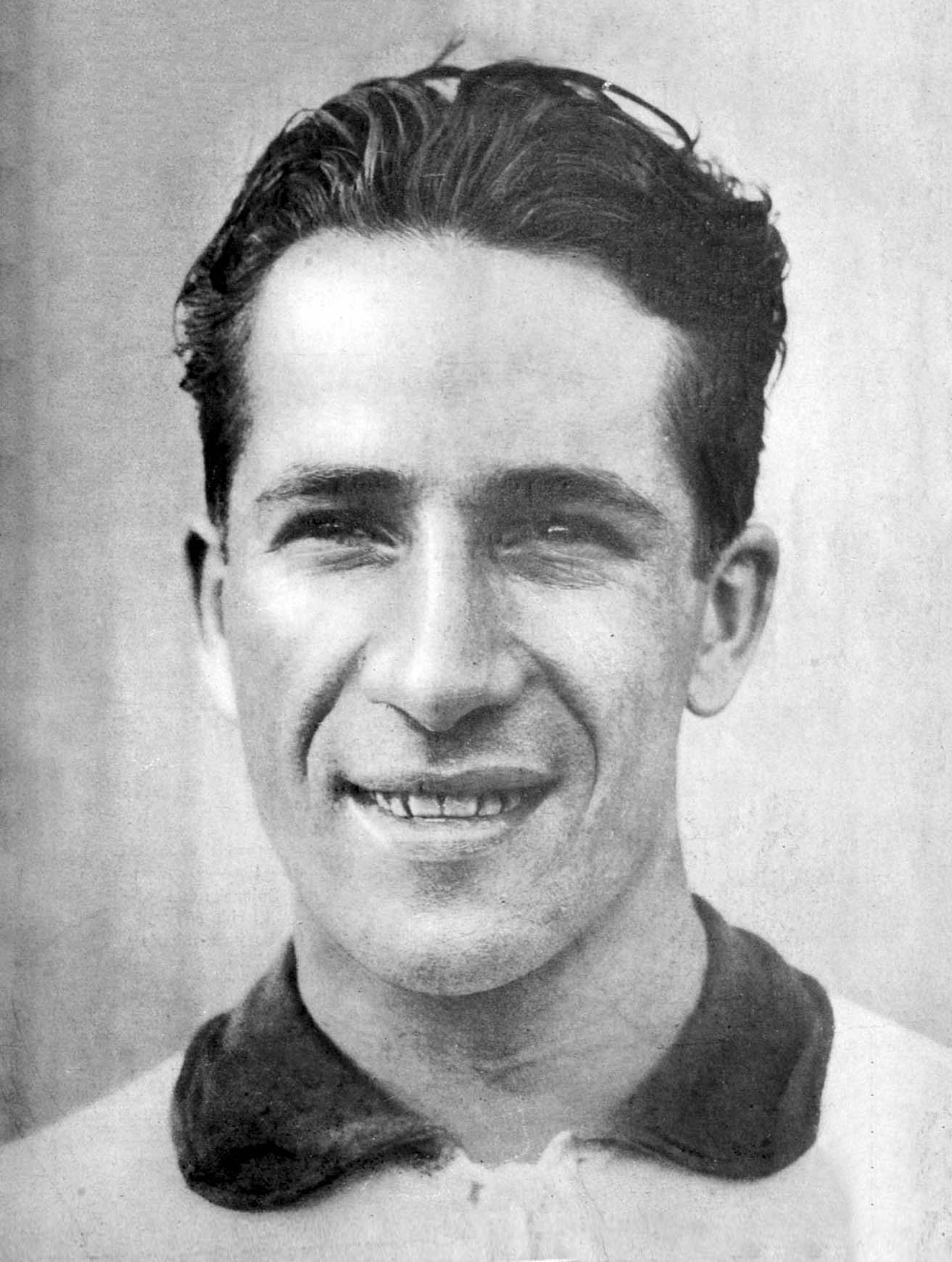
Guillermo Stábile scored a then-record eight goals for Argentina at the 1930 World Cup.

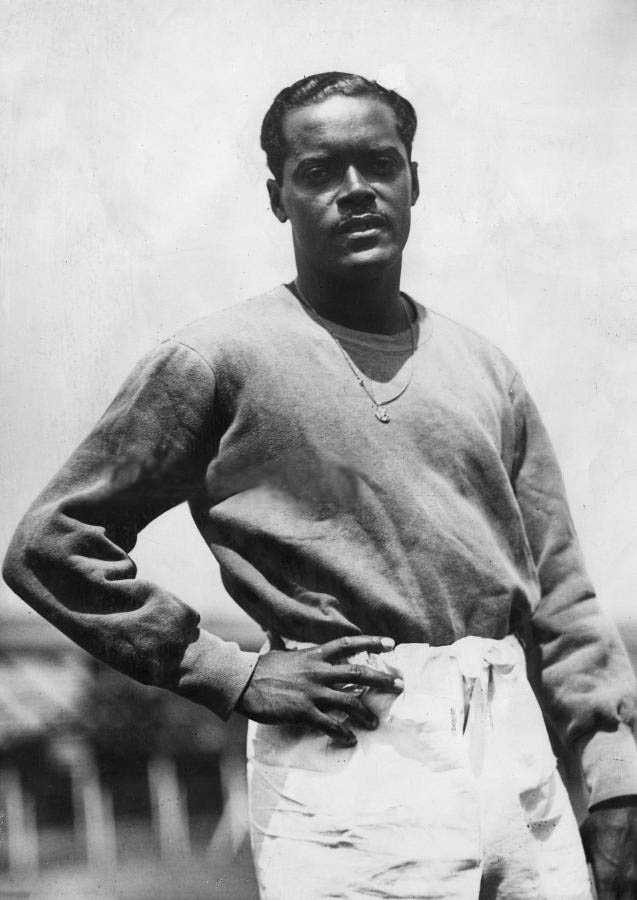
Leônidas scored a record eight World Cup goals for Brazil across the 1934 and 1938 tournaments, all of them in knockout matches—a record that stood until 2026.

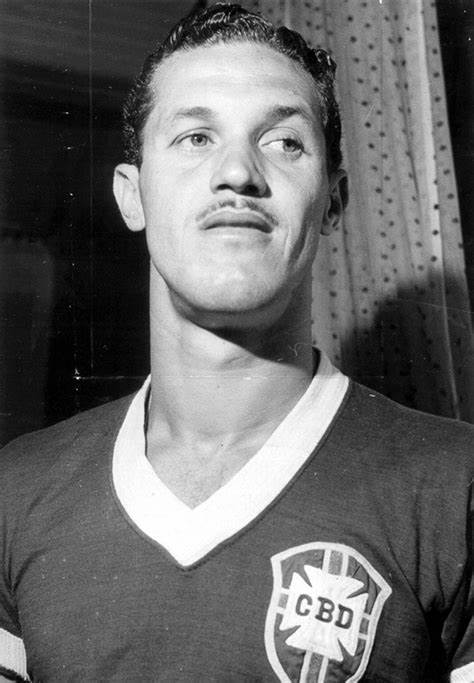
Ademir scored a record nine World Cup goals for Brazil, all coming at the 1950 tournament.

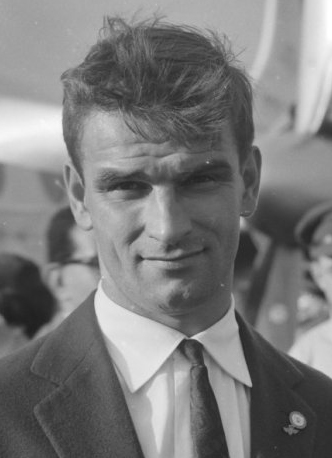
Sándor Kocsis was the first player to score ten or more goals in a single World Cup: he scored a record eleven goals in just five matches for Hungary during the 1954 tournament.

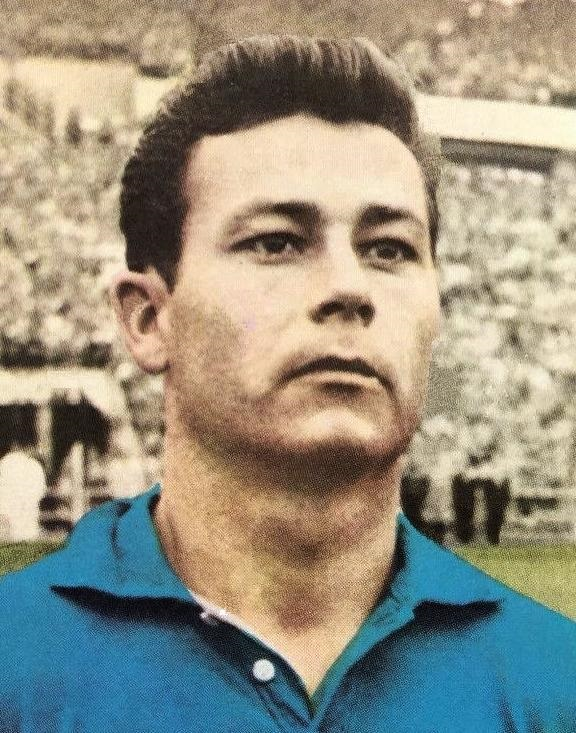
Just Fontaine scored a record thirteen World Cup goals for France, all coming at the 1958 tournament.

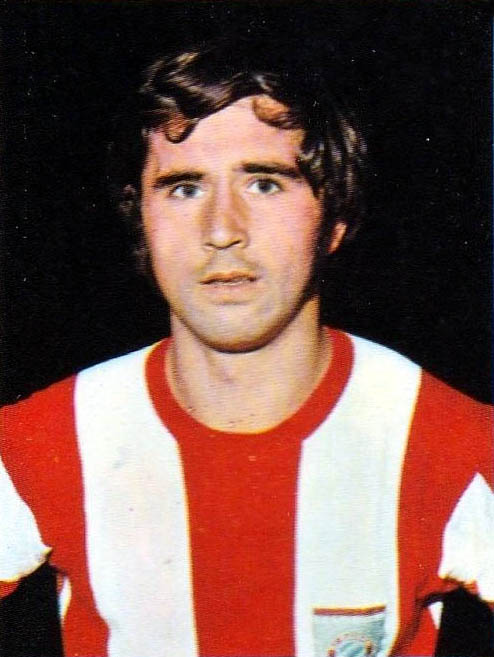
Gerd Müller scored ten goals for West Germany at the 1970 World Cup, and was top goalscorer from 1974 to 2006.

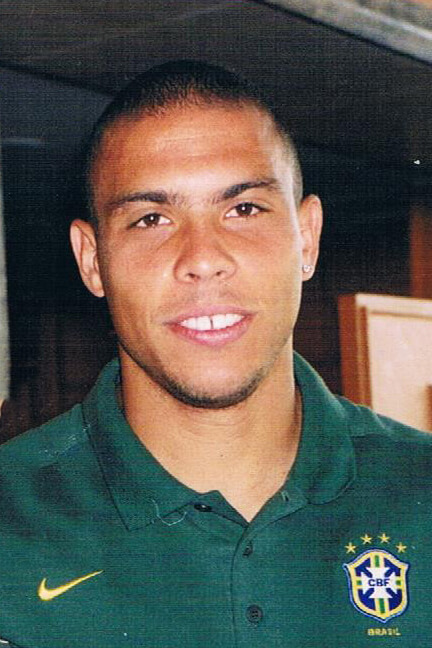
Ronaldo was top goal scorer from 2006 to 2014, scoring fifteen goals for Brazil, including two in the 2002 final.

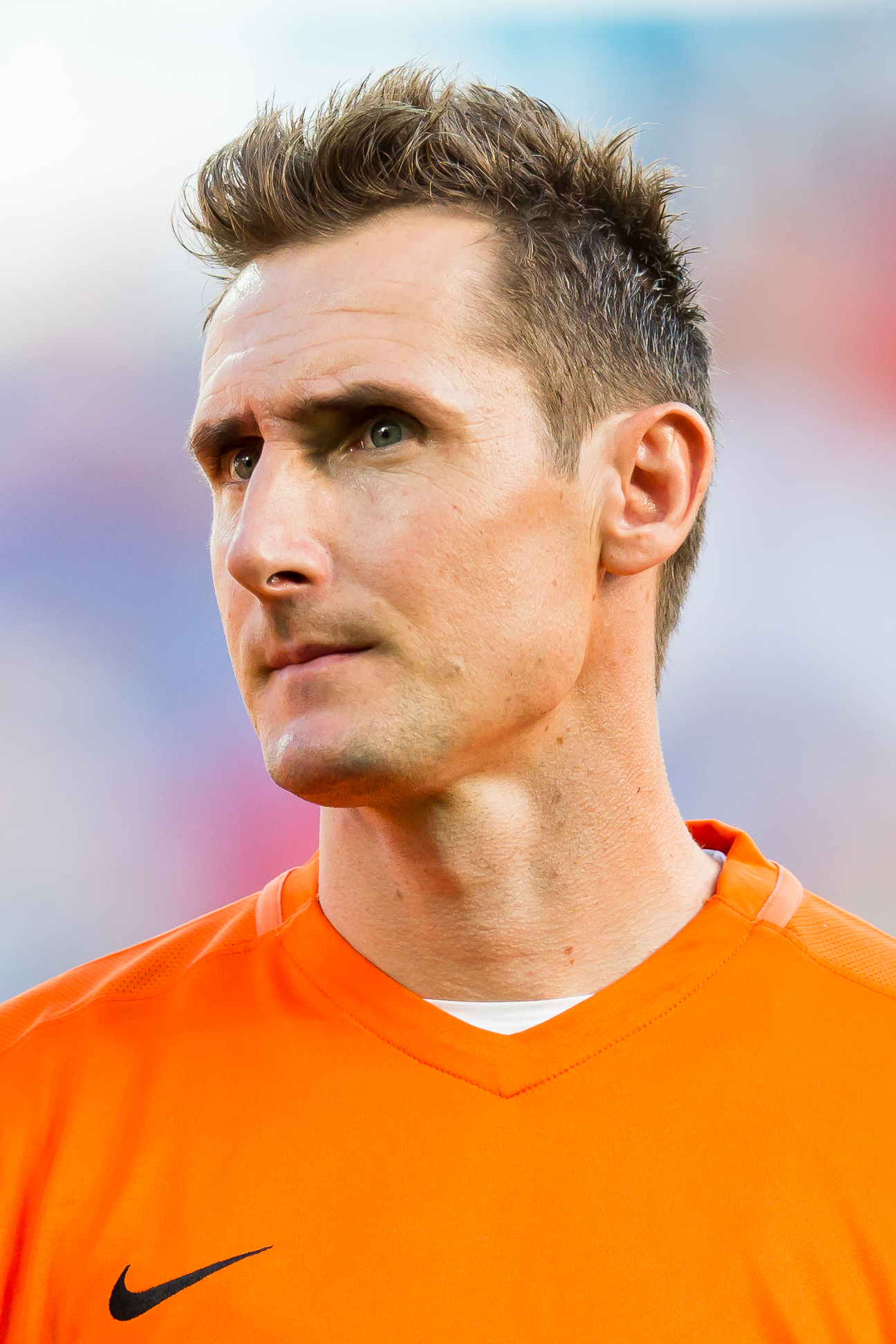
Scoring 16 goals for Germany, Miroslav Klose was top goalscorer from 2014 to 2026.

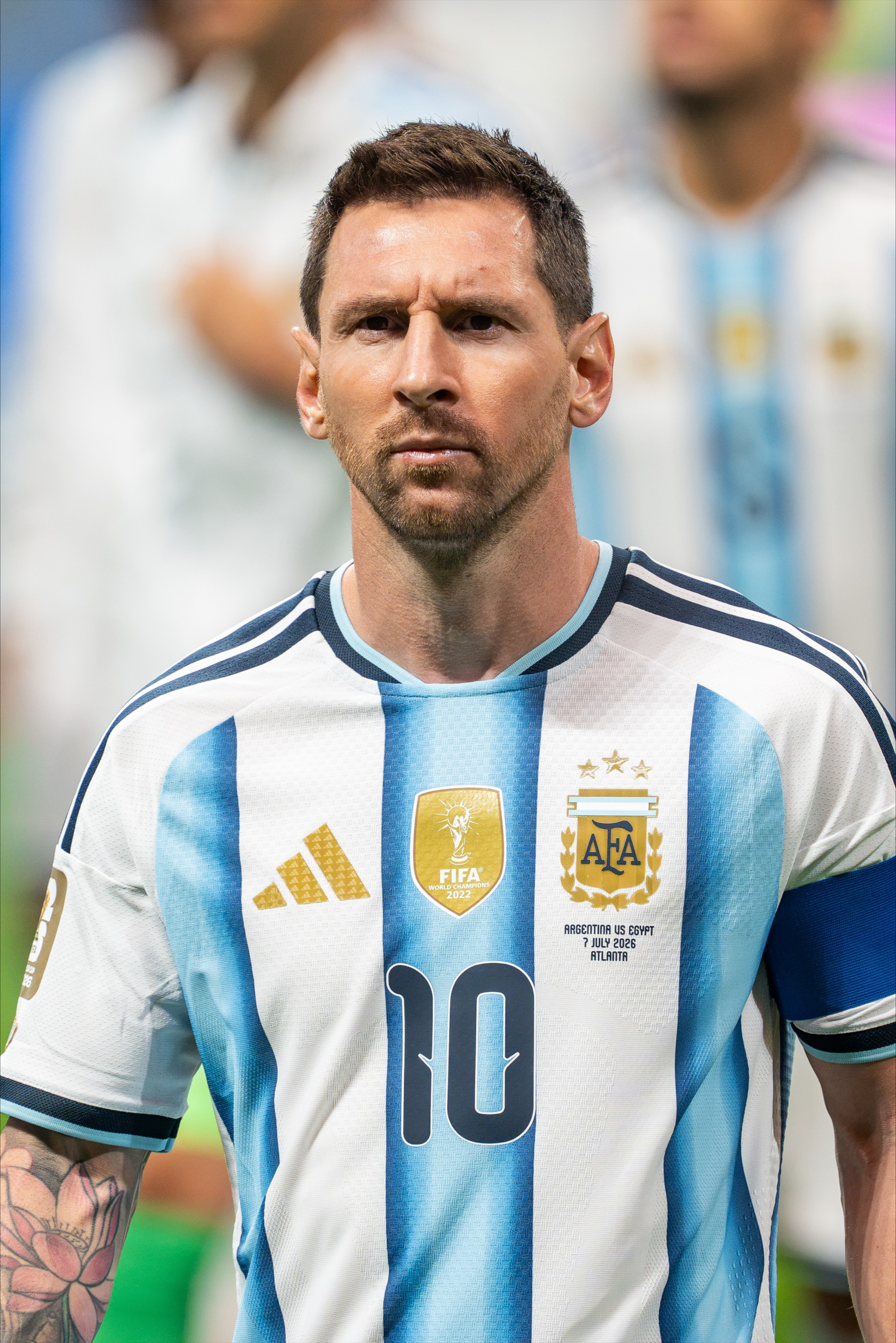
Lionel Messi was the first player to score twenty goals.

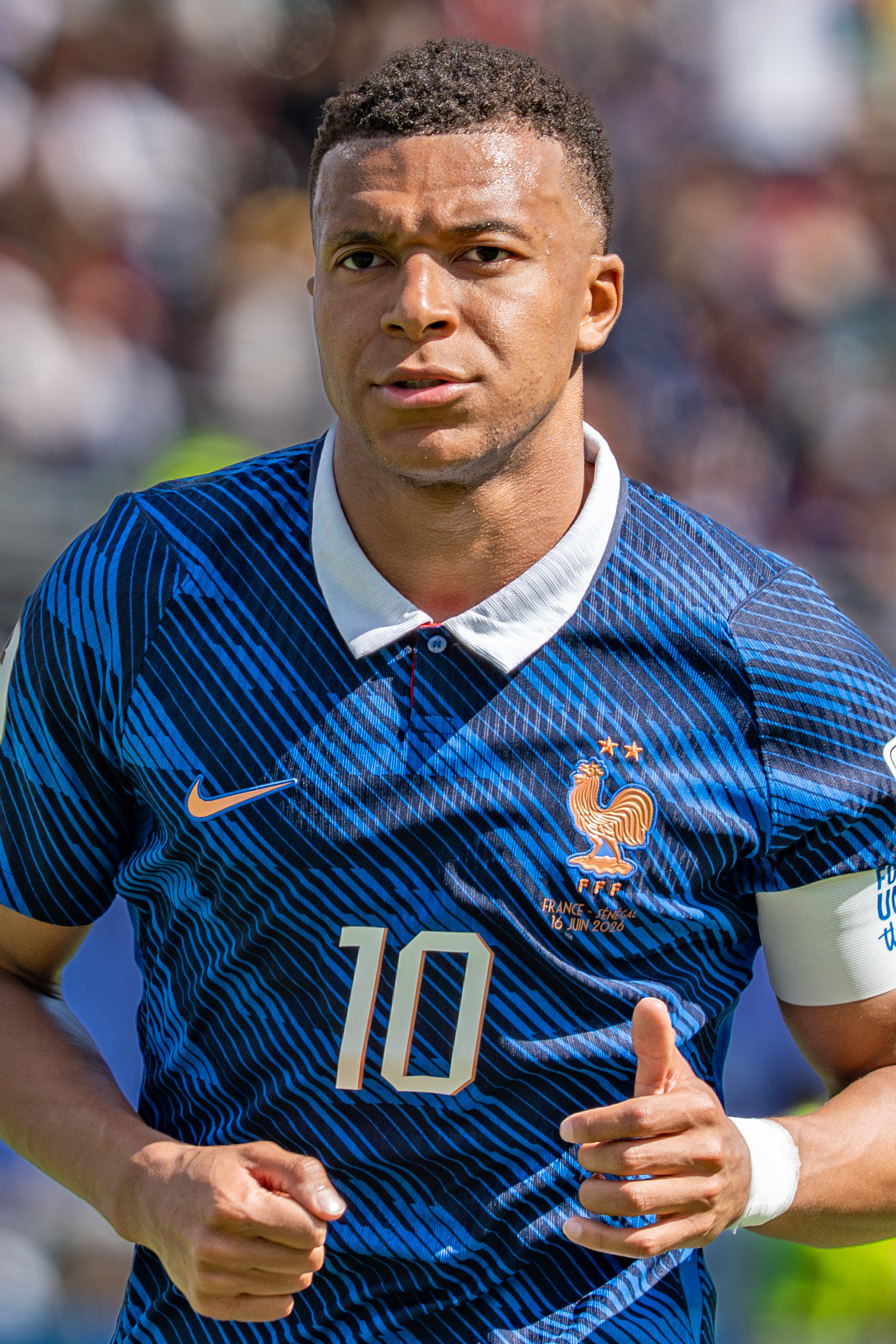
Kylian Mbappé holds the record at 22 goals.

Key
Goal set a new record
Goal equalled the existing record

Progressive list of footballers that have held the record for most goals scored in FIFA World Cup final tournaments (Note: The progressive record for most goals scored in a single final tournament comprises all the entries as far as Just Fontaine in 1958, excluding Leônidas in 1938, since the others each scored all their goals within a single tournament.)
Goals	Date	Player	Team	Goal	Opponent	Score	Tournament, stage	Previous goals	Ref.
1	13 July 1930	Lucien Laurent	France	1–0	Mexico	4–1	1930, Uruguay; Group stage	N/A	(Note: The two initial games of the 1930 FIFA World Cup (France vs Mexico and United States vs Belgium) were played at the same time, as seven players scored, with André Maschinot scoring two goals. The order in which these players are listed reflects the actual elapsed time in the games when their goals were scored.)
1	13 July 1930	Bart McGhee	United States	1–0	Belgium	3–0	1930, Uruguay; Group stage	N/A	(Note: The two initial games of the 1930 FIFA World Cup (France vs Mexico and United States vs Belgium) were played at the same time, as seven players scored, with André Maschinot scoring two goals. The order in which these players are listed reflects the actual elapsed time in the games when their goals were scored.)
1	13 July 1930	Marcel Langiller	France	2–0	Mexico	4–1	1930, Uruguay; Group stage	N/A	(Note: The two initial games of the 1930 FIFA World Cup (France vs Mexico and United States vs Belgium) were played at the same time, as seven players scored, with André Maschinot scoring two goals. The order in which these players are listed reflects the actual elapsed time in the games when their goals were scored.)
1	13 July 1930	André Maschinot	France	3–0	Mexico	4–1	1930, Uruguay; Group stage	N/A	(Note: The two initial games of the 1930 FIFA World Cup (France vs Mexico and United States vs Belgium) were played at the same time, as seven players scored, with André Maschinot scoring two goals. The order in which these players are listed reflects the actual elapsed time in the games when their goals were scored.)
1	13 July 1930	Tom Florie	United States	2–0	Belgium	3–0	1930, Uruguay; Group stage	N/A	(Note: The two initial games of the 1930 FIFA World Cup (France vs Mexico and United States vs Belgium) were played at the same time, as seven players scored, with André Maschinot scoring two goals. The order in which these players are listed reflects the actual elapsed time in the games when their goals were scored.)
1	13 July 1930	Bert Patenaude	United States	3–0	Belgium	3–0	1930, Uruguay; Group stage	N/A	(Note: The two initial games of the 1930 FIFA World Cup (France vs Mexico and United States vs Belgium) were played at the same time, as seven players scored, with André Maschinot scoring two goals. The order in which these players are listed reflects the actual elapsed time in the games when their goals were scored.)
1	13 July 1930	Juan Carreño	Mexico	1–3	France	1–4	1930, Uruguay; Group stage	N/A	(Note: The two initial games of the 1930 FIFA World Cup (France vs Mexico and United States vs Belgium) were played at the same time, as seven players scored, with André Maschinot scoring two goals. The order in which these players are listed reflects the actual elapsed time in the games when their goals were scored.)
2	13 July 1930	André Maschinot	France	4–1	Mexico	4–1	1930, Uruguay; Group stage	1930 vs Mexico	(Note: The two initial games of the 1930 FIFA World Cup (France vs Mexico and United States vs Belgium) were played at the same time, as seven players scored, with André Maschinot scoring two goals. The order in which these players are listed reflects the actual elapsed time in the games when their goals were scored.)
2	16 July 1930	Carlos Vidal	Chile	3–0	Mexico	3–0	1930, Uruguay; Group stage	1930 vs Mexico	
2	17 July 1930	Ivan Bek	Yugoslavia	1–0	Bolivia	4–0	1930, Uruguay; Group stage	1930 vs Brazil	
3	17 July 1930	Ivan Bek	Yugoslavia	3–0	Bolivia	4–0	1930, Uruguay; Group stage	1930 vs Brazil	
3	17 July 1930	Bert Patenaude	United States	2–0	Paraguay	3–0	1930, Uruguay; Group stage	1930 vs Belgium, Paraguay	
4	17 July 1930	Bert Patenaude	United States	3–0	Paraguay	3–0	1930, Uruguay; Group stage	1930 vs Belgium, Paraguay	
4	22 July 1930	Guillermo Stábile	Argentina	1–0	Chile	3–1	1930, Uruguay; Group stage	1930 vs Mexico (3)	
5	22 July 1930	Guillermo Stábile	Argentina	2–0	Chile	3–1	1930, Uruguay; Group stage	1930 vs Mexico (3)	
6	26 July 1930	Guillermo Stábile	Argentina	3–0	United States	6–1	1930, Uruguay; Semi-final	1930 vs Mexico (3)	
7	26 July 1930	Guillermo Stábile	Argentina	6–0	United States	6–1	1930, Uruguay; Semi-final	1930 vs Mexico (3)	
8	30 July 1930	Guillermo Stábile	Argentina	2–1	Uruguay	2–4	1930, Uruguay; Final	1930 vs Mexico (3)	
8	19 June 1938	Leônidas	Brazil	3–2	Sweden	4–2	1938, France; Match for third place	1934 vs Spain; 1938 vs Poland (3), Czechoslovakia, Czechoslovakia, Sweden	
8	13 July 1950	Ademir	Brazil	1–0	Spain	6–1	1950, Brazil; Final round	1950 vs Mexico (2), Yugoslavia, Sweden (4)	
9	13 July 1950	Ademir	Brazil	5–0	Spain	6–1	1950, Brazil; Final round	1950 vs Mexico (2), Yugoslavia, Sweden (4)	
9	27 June 1954	Sándor Kocsis	Hungary	4–2	Brazil	4–2	1954, Switzerland; Quarter-final	1954 vs South Korea (3), West Germany (4), Brazil	
10	30 June 1954	Sándor Kocsis	Hungary	3–2	Uruguay	4–2 (a.e.t.)	1954, Switzerland; Semi-final	1954 vs South Korea (3), West Germany (4), Brazil	
11	30 June 1954	Sándor Kocsis	Hungary	4–2	Uruguay	4–2 (a.e.t.)	1954, Switzerland; Semi-final	1954 vs South Korea (3), West Germany (4), Brazil	
11	28 June 1958	Just Fontaine	France	3–1	West Germany	6–3	1958, Sweden; Match for third place	1958 vs Paraguay (3), Yugoslavia (2), Scotland, Northern Ireland (2), Brazil, West Germany	
12	28 June 1958	Just Fontaine	France	5–2	West Germany	6–3	1958, Sweden; Match for third place	1958 vs Paraguay (3), Yugoslavia (2), Scotland, Northern Ireland (2), Brazil, West Germany	
13	28 June 1958	Just Fontaine	France	6–3	West Germany	6–3	1958, Sweden; Match for third place	1958 vs Paraguay (3), Yugoslavia (2), Scotland, Northern Ireland (2), Brazil, West Germany	
13	3 July 1974	Gerd Müller	West Germany	1–0	Poland	1–0	1974, West Germany; Second round	1970 vs Morocco, Bulgaria (3), Peru (3), England, Italy (2); 1974 vs Australia, Yugoslavia	
14	6 July 1974	Gerd Müller	West Germany	2–1	Netherlands	2–1	1974, West Germany; Final	1970 vs Morocco, Bulgaria (3), Peru (3), England, Italy (2); 1974 vs Australia, Yugoslavia	
14	22 June 2006	Ronaldo	Brazil	4–1	Japan	4–1	2006, Germany; Group stage	1998 vs Morocco, Chile (2), Netherlands; 2002 vs Turkey, China, Costa Rica (2), Belgium, Turkey, Germany (2); 2006 vs Japan	
15	27 June 2006	Ronaldo	Brazil	1–0	Ghana	3–0	2006, Germany; Round of 16	1998 vs Morocco, Chile (2), Netherlands; 2002 vs Turkey, China, Costa Rica (2), Belgium, Turkey, Germany (2); 2006 vs Japan	
15	21 June 2014	Miroslav Klose	Germany	2–2	Ghana	2–2	2014, Brazil; Group stage	2002 vs Saudi Arabia (3), Ireland, Cameroon; 2006 vs Costa Rica (2), Ecuador (2), Argentina; 2010 vs Australia, England, Argentina (2)	
16	8 July 2014	Miroslav Klose	Germany	2–0	Brazil	7–1	2014, Brazil; Semi-final	2002 vs Saudi Arabia (3), Ireland, Cameroon; 2006 vs Costa Rica (2), Ecuador (2), Argentina; 2010 vs Australia, England, Argentina (2)	
16	16 June 2026	Lionel Messi	Argentina	3–0	Algeria	3–0	2026, Canada-Mexico-United States; Group stage	2006 vs Serbia and Montenegro; 2014 vs Bosnia and Herzegovina, Iran, Nigeria (2); 2018 vs Nigeria; 2022 vs Saudi Arabia, Mexico, Australia, Netherlands, Croatia, France (2); 2026 vs Algeria (2)	
17	22 June 2026	Lionel Messi	Argentina	1–0	Austria	2–0	2026, Canada-Mexico-United States; Group stage	2006 vs Serbia and Montenegro; 2014 vs Bosnia and Herzegovina, Iran, Nigeria (2); 2018 vs Nigeria; 2022 vs Saudi Arabia, Mexico, Australia, Netherlands, Croatia, France (2); 2026 vs Algeria (2)	
18	22 June 2026	Lionel Messi	Argentina	2–0	Austria	2–0	2026, Canada-Mexico-United States; Group stage	2006 vs Serbia and Montenegro; 2014 vs Bosnia and Herzegovina, Iran, Nigeria (2); 2018 vs Nigeria; 2022 vs Saudi Arabia, Mexico, Australia, Netherlands, Croatia, France (2); 2026 vs Algeria (2)	
19	27 June 2026	Lionel Messi	Argentina	3–1	Jordan	3–1	2026, Canada-Mexico-United States; Group stage	2006 vs Serbia and Montenegro; 2014 vs Bosnia and Herzegovina, Iran, Nigeria (2); 2018 vs Nigeria; 2022 vs Saudi Arabia, Mexico, Australia, Netherlands, Croatia, France (2); 2026 vs Algeria (2)	
20	3 July 2026	Lionel Messi	Argentina	1–0	Cape Verde	3–2 (a.e.t.)	2026, Canada-Mexico-United States; Round of 32	2006 vs Serbia and Montenegro; 2014 vs Bosnia and Herzegovina, Iran, Nigeria (2); 2018 vs Nigeria; 2022 vs Saudi Arabia, Mexico, Australia, Netherlands, Croatia, France (2); 2026 vs Algeria (2)	
21	7 July 2026	Lionel Messi	Argentina	2–2	Egypt	3–2	2026, Canada-Mexico-United States; Round of 16	2006 vs Serbia and Montenegro; 2014 vs Bosnia and Herzegovina, Iran, Nigeria (2); 2018 vs Nigeria; 2022 vs Saudi Arabia, Mexico, Australia, Netherlands, Croatia, France (2); 2026 vs Algeria (2)	
21	18 July 2026	Kylian Mbappé	France	1–4	England	4–6	2026, Canada-Mexico-United States; Match for third place	2018 vs Peru, Argentina (2), Croatia; 2022 vs Australia, Denmark (2), Poland (2), Argentina (3); 2026 vs Senegal (2), Iraq (2), Sweden (2), Paraguay, Morocco	
22	18 July 2026	Kylian Mbappé	France	3–4	England	4–6	2026, Canada-Mexico-United States; Match for third place	2018 vs Peru, Argentina (2), Croatia; 2022 vs Australia, Denmark (2), Poland (2), Argentina (3); 2026 vs Senegal (2), Iraq (2), Sweden (2), Paraguay, Morocco	

== Top goalscorers for each tournament ==
Key
†	Denotes the record for the most goals in a single tournament

Top goalscorers at each FIFA World Cup final tournament
World Cup	Player	Team	Goals scored	Matches played	Golden Boot	Other FIFA Awards
Uruguay 1930	Guillermo Stábile	Argentina	8	4	Yes	Silver Ball
Italy 1934	Oldřich Nejedlý	Czechoslovakia	5	4	Yes	Bronze Ball
France 1938	Leônidas	Brazil	7	4	Yes	Golden Ball
Brazil 1950	Ademir	Brazil	9	6	Yes	Bronze Ball
Switzerland 1954	Sándor Kocsis	Hungary	11	5	Yes	Silver Ball
Sweden 1958	Just Fontaine	France	13^{†}	6	Yes	Bronze Ball
Chile 1962	Garrincha	Brazil	4	6	Yes	Golden Ball
Chile 1962	Vavá	Brazil	4	6	Yes	
Chile 1962	Leonel Sánchez	Chile	4	6	Yes	Bronze Ball
Chile 1962	Flórián Albert	Hungary	4	3	Yes	Best Young Player
Chile 1962	Valentin Ivanov	Soviet Union	4	4	Yes	
Chile 1962	Dražan Jerković	Yugoslavia	4	6	Yes	
England 1966	Eusébio	Portugal	9	6	Yes	Bronze Ball
Mexico 1970	Gerd Müller	West Germany	10	6	Yes	Best Young Player, Bronze Ball
West Germany 1974	Grzegorz Lato	Poland	7	7	Yes	
Argentina 1978	Mario Kempes	Argentina	6	7	Yes	Golden Ball
Spain 1982	Paolo Rossi	Italy	6	7	Yes	Golden Ball
Mexico 1986	Gary Lineker	England	6	5	Yes	
Italy 1990	Salvatore Schillaci	Italy	6	7	Yes	Golden Ball
United States 1994	Hristo Stoichkov	Bulgaria	6	7	Yes	Bronze Ball
United States 1994	Oleg Salenko	Russia	6	3	Yes	
France 1998	Davor Šuker	Croatia	6	7	Yes	Silver Ball
South Korea & Japan 2002	Ronaldo	Brazil	8	7	Yes	Silver Ball
Germany 2006	Miroslav Klose	Germany	5	7	Yes	
South Africa 2010	Thomas Müller	Germany	5	6	Yes	Best Young Player
South Africa 2010	David Villa	Spain	5	7	No	Silver Boot, Bronze Ball
South Africa 2010	Wesley Sneijder	Netherlands	5	7	No	Bronze Boot, Silver Ball
South Africa 2010	Diego Forlán	Uruguay	5	7	No	Golden Ball
Brazil 2014	James Rodríguez	Colombia	6	5	Yes	
Russia 2018	Harry Kane	England	6	6	Yes	
Qatar 2022	Kylian Mbappé	France	8	7	Yes	Silver Ball
Canada/Mexico/United States 2026	Kylian Mbappé	France	10	8	Yes	Bronze Ball

== Goalscorers at multiple tournaments ==
Portugal's Cristiano Ronaldo is the only player to have scored in six World Cups, while Argentina's Lionel Messi has scored in five. Five players (Uwe Seeler, Pelé, Miroslav Klose, Ivan Perišić and Neymar) have each scored in four tournaments, while another 39 have each scored in three.

In the table below players with the same rank are listed in order of achieving their tally.

Players who scored at 3 or more World Cups
Rank	Player	Team	Tournaments with goals	Goals scored	Matches played	Goals per match	Tournaments with goals
1	Cristiano Ronaldo	Portugal	6	11	27	0.41	2006, 2010, 2014, 2018, 2022, 2026
2	Lionel Messi	Argentina	5	21	34	0.62	2006, 2014, 2018, 2022, 2026
3	Uwe Seeler	West Germany	4	9	21	0.43	1958, 1962, 1966, 1970
3	Pelé	Brazil	4	12	14	0.86	1958, 1962, 1966, 1970
3	Miroslav Klose	Germany	4	16	24	0.67	2002, 2006, 2010, 2014
3	Ivan Perišić	Croatia	4	7	21	0.33	2014, 2018, 2022, 2026
3	Neymar	Brazil	4	9	15	0.60	2014, 2018, 2022, 2026
8	Grzegorz Lato	Poland	3	10	20	0.50	1974, 1978, 1982
8	Joe Jordan	Scotland	3	4	7	0.57	1974, 1978, 1982
8	Andrzej Szarmach	Poland	3	7	13	0.54	1974, 1978, 1982
8	Dominique Rocheteau	France	3	4	10	0.40	1978, 1982, 1986
8	Michel Platini	France	3	5	14	0.36	1978, 1982, 1986
8	Karl-Heinz Rummenigge	West Germany	3	9	19	0.47	1978, 1982, 1986
8	Julio Salinas	Spain	3	3	12	0.25	1986, 1990, 1994
8	Diego Maradona	Argentina	3	8	21	0.38	1982, 1986, 1994
8	Rudi Völler	West Germany; Germany	3	8	15	0.53	1986, 1990; 1994
8	Lothar Matthäus	West Germany; Germany	3	6	25	0.24	1986, 1990; 1994
8	Roberto Baggio	Italy	3	9	16	0.56	1990, 1994, 1998
8	Jürgen Klinsmann	West Germany; Germany	3	11	17	0.65	1990; 1994, 1998
8	Gabriel Batistuta	Argentina	3	10	12	0.83	1994, 1998, 2002
8	Fernando Hierro	Spain	3	5	12	0.42	1994, 1998, 2002
8	Sami Al-Jaber	Saudi Arabia	3	3	9	0.33	1994, 1998, 2006
8	Raúl	Spain	3	5	11	0.45	1998, 2002, 2006
8	Henrik Larsson	Sweden	3	5	13	0.38	1994, 2002, 2006
8	Ronaldo	Brazil	3	15	19	0.79	1998, 2002, 2006
8	David Beckham	England	3	3	13	0.23	1998, 2002, 2006
8	Park Ji-sung	South Korea	3	3	14	0.21	2002, 2006, 2010
8	Cuauhtémoc Blanco	Mexico	3	3	11	0.27	1998, 2002, 2010
8	Robin van Persie	Netherlands	3	6	17	0.35	2006, 2010, 2014
8	Arjen Robben	Netherlands	3	6	15	0.40	2006, 2010, 2014
8	Tim Cahill	Australia	3	5	9	0.56	2006, 2010, 2014
8	Clint Dempsey	United States	3	4	10	0.40	2006, 2010, 2014
8	Asamoah Gyan	Ghana	3	6	11	0.55	2006, 2010, 2014
8	David Villa	Spain	3	9	12	0.75	2006, 2010, 2014
8	Rafael Márquez	Mexico	3	3	19	0.16	2006, 2010, 2014
8	Luis Suárez	Uruguay	3	7	16	0.44	2010, 2014, 2018
8	Javier Hernández	Mexico	3	4	12	0.33	2010, 2014, 2018
8	Keisuke Honda	Japan	3	4	10	0.40	2010, 2014, 2018
8	Edinson Cavani	Uruguay	3	5	17	0.29	2010, 2014, 2018
8	Xherdan Shaqiri	Switzerland	3	5	12	0.42	2014, 2018, 2022
8	Ángel Di María	Argentina	3	3	18	0.17	2014, 2018, 2022
8	Kylian Mbappé	France	3	22	22	1.00	2018, 2022, 2026
8	Harry Kane	England	3	14	18	0.78	2018, 2022, 2026
8	Granit Xhaka	Switzerland	3	3	18	0.17	2014, 2018, 2026
8	Kevin De Bruyne	Belgium	3	3	18	0.17	2014, 2018, 2026
8	Romelu Lukaku	Belgium	3	8	18	0.44	2014, 2018, 2026

== Top goalscorers in knockout matches ==
The format has varied considerably between different tournaments, resulting in different numbers of knockout matches per tournament. The 1934 and 1938 World Cups were exclusively knockout competitions. The 1950 edition featured no knockout games, as the champion was decided by a final group stage. Four others had very few: 1930 (three), 1974 (two), 1978 (two) and 1982 (four):

- The 1930 tournament featured only three knockout matches after the group stage, consisting of the two semi-finals and the final.
- In 1974 and 1978, a second group phase replaced the traditional quarter-finals and semi-finals used from 1954 through 1970, leaving only the final and third-place match as knockout fixtures.
- The 1982 tournament featured four knockout matches, consisting of the reintroduced semi-final stage alongside the third-place match and final. It also marked the last time a second group phase was used instead of direct knockout rounds after the group stage.

Table key
Bold (player)	Denotes players still active at international level
( )	Denotes tournaments where the player played in one or more matches, but did not score a goal
Bold (year)	Denotes tournaments where the player's team won the World Cup
Italic (year)	Denotes ongoing tournament for the player's team

Players with most goals in FIFA World Cup knockout stages
Rank	Player	Team	Goals scored	Matches played	Ratio	Years
1	Kylian Mbappé	France	14	13	1.08	2018, 2022, 2026
2	Leônidas	Brazil	8	5	1.60	1934, 1938
2	Ronaldo	Brazil	8	10	0.80	1998, 2002, 2006
4	Just Fontaine	France	7	3	2.33	1958
4	Vavá	Brazil	7	5	1.40	1958, 1962
4	Oldřich Nejedlý	Czechoslovakia	7	6	1.17	1934, 1938
4	Pelé	Brazil	7	6	1.17	1958, 1970
4	Lionel Messi	Argentina	7	17	0.41	(2006), (2010), (2014), (2018), 2022, 2026
9	Eusébio	Portugal	6	3	2.00	1966
9	György Sárosi	Hungary	6	5	1.20	1934, 1938
9	Gary Lineker	England	6	6	1.00	1986, 1990
9	Roberto Baggio	Italy	6	9	0.67	1990, 1994, (1998)
9	Harry Kane	England	6	10	0.60	2018, 2022, 2026
14	Gyula Zsengellér	Hungary	5	4	1.25	1938
14	Silvio Piola	Italy	5	4	1.25	1938
14	Helmut Rahn	West Germany	5	6	0.83	1954, 1958
14	Zinedine Zidane	France	5	7	0.71	1998, 2006
14	Thomas Müller	Germany	5	7	0.71	2010, 2014
14	Jude Bellingham	England	5	7	0.71	(2022), 2026
14	Wesley Sneijder	Netherlands	5	8	0.63	(2006), 2010, 2014
14	Miroslav Klose	Germany	5	14	0.36	(2002), 2006, 2010, 2014

== Top goalscorers in final matches ==
Players with multiple goals in FIFA World Cup Finals
Rank	Player	Team	Goals scored	Final matches		
Rank	Player	Team	Goals scored	Played	Scored in	Years
1	Kylian Mbappé	France	4	2	2	**2018**, 2022 (3)
2	Geoff Hurst	England	3	1	1	**1966** (3)
2	Vavá	Brazil	3	2	2	**1958** (2), **1962**
2	Pelé	Brazil	3	2	2	**1958** (2), **1970**
2	Zinedine Zidane	France	3	2	2	**1998** (2), 2006
6	Gino Colaussi	Italy	2	1	1	**1938** (2)
6	Silvio Piola	Italy	2	1	1	**1938** (2)
6	Helmut Rahn	West Germany	2	1	1	**1954** (2)
6	Mario Kempes	Argentina	2	1	1	**1978** (2)
6	Paul Breitner	West Germany	2	2	2	**1974**, 1982
6	Ronaldo	Brazil	2	2	1	(1998), **2002** (2)
6	Lionel Messi	Argentina	2	3	1	(2014), **2022** (2), (2026)

- **Bold** indicates winning final
- Parentheses around a year indicates no goals scored

== See also ==
- List of players who have appeared in the most FIFA World Cups
- FIFA Women's World Cup top goalscorers
- All-time table of the FIFA World Cup
- List of FIFA World Cup own goals
- List of FIFA World Cup hat-tricks
