= Julio Quintana =

Julio Quintana may refer to:

- Julio Quintana (footballer)
- Julio Quintana (politician)
- Julio Quintana (filmmaker)
