= Noya =

Noya may refer to:

- Noia, a municipality of the pronvice of A Coruña, Galicia, Spain
  - CF Noia, a football club from the city
- Noia (comarca), a division of the pronvice of A Coruña, Galicia, Spain
- Noya Department, a department of Estuaire Province, Gabon
- Noya River, a river in Gabon and Equatorial Guinea
- Noya (given name), given name meaning "divine beauty"
- Noya Station, a railway station in Japan

== Persons with the surname ==
- Constantino Noya (playing in 1930), Bolivian footballer
- Francisco Javier Gómez Noya (born 1983), Spanish triathlete
- Maria Magnani Noya, (1931–2011), Italian lawyer and politician
- Nippy Noya (born 1946), Indonesian percussionist
- Rodrigo Noya (born 1993), Argentine actor
- Rodrigo Javier Noya (born 1990), Argentine footballer
