= Garcete =

Garcete is a surname. Notable people with the surname include:

- Gabriel Garcete (born 1982), Paraguayan footballer
- Oscar Páez Garcete (1937–2016), Paraguayan Roman Catholic bishop
- Tranquilino Garcete (1907–?), Paraguayan footballer
- Lucas Garcete (born 2000), Paraguayan poet
