= Salvador Flores (disambiguation) =

Salvador Flores (ca. 1806–1855) was a soldier during the Texas Revolution

Salvador Flores may also refer to:

- Salvador Flores (footballer) (born 1906), Paraguayan footballer
- Salvador Flores Huerta (1934–2018), Mexican prelate of the Roman Catholic Church
- Salvador Flores Rivera, "Chava Flores" (1920–1987), Mexican singer-songwriter
