= César Espinoza =

César Espinoza can refer to:

- César Espinoza (Chilean footballer)
- César Espinoza (Venezuelan footballer)
