= Milan Stojanović =

Milan Stojanović may refer to:

- Milan Stojanović (goalkeeper) (active in 1930), Yugoslavian football goalkeeper
- Milan Stojanović (midfielder) (born 1988), Serbian football midfielder
