= Pedro Benítez =

Pedro Benítez may refer to:

- Pedro Benítez (footballer, born 1901) (1901–1974), Paraguayan football goalkeeper
- Pedro Benítez (footballer, born 1981), Paraguayan football defender
