= Miguel Murillo =

Miguel Murillo may refer to:

- Miguel Murillo (Bolivian footballer) (1898–1968), Bolivian football goalkeeper
- Miguel Murillo (footballer, born 1988), Colombian football striker
- Miguel Murillo (footballer, born 1993), Colombian football forward for Rionegro Águilas
- Miguel Murillo (judoka) (born 1993), Costa Rican judoka
