= Carlos Spadaro =

Argentine footballer

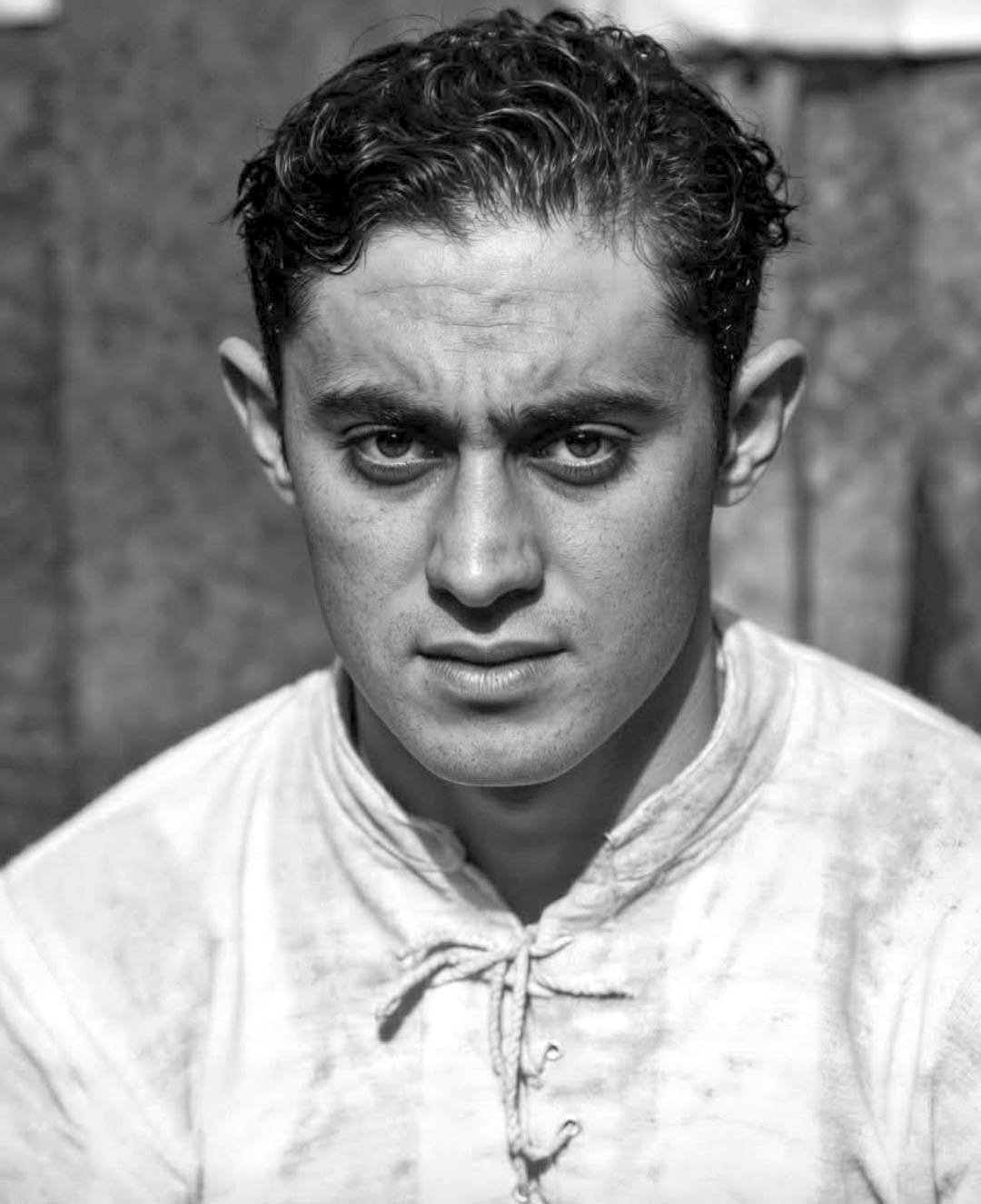

Personal information
- Date of birth: 5 February 1902
- Place of birth: Lanús, Argentina
- Date of death: 15 November 1985 (aged 83)
- Position: Forward

Senior career*
Years	Team	Apps	(Gls)
1926-1930	Lanús		
1931	Estudiantil Porteño		
1932-1933	Lanús	47	(8)

International career
1928–1931	Argentina	5	(1)
Medal record
Men's Football
Representing Argentina
FIFA World Cup
Runner-up	1930 Uruguay	Team
- * Club domestic league appearances and goals

Carlos Spadaro (5 February 1902 – 15 November 1985) was an Argentine football attacker.
