= Miguel Brito =

Bolivian footballer

Personal information
- Date of birth: 13 June 1901
- Place of birth: Bolivia
- Position: Midfielder

Senior career*
Years	Team	Apps	(Gls)
1930	Oruro Royal		

International career
1930	Bolivia	0	(0)
- * Club domestic league appearances and goals

Miguel Brito (born 13 June 1901, date of death unknown) was a Bolivian footballer who played as a midfielder.

== Career ==
During his career he participated and made zero appearances for the Bolivia national team at the 1930 FIFA World Cup. His career in club football was spent in Oruro Royal. Brito is deceased.
