= Jesús Castro (Mexican footballer) =

Mexican footballer (born 1908)

Personal information
- Full name: Jesús Castro Aguirre
- Date of birth: 16 October 1908
- Place of birth: Mexico
- Date of death: unknown
- Position: Forward

Senior career*
Years	Team	Apps	(Gls)
c.1930	Club América		

International career
1930	Mexico	0	(0)
- * Club domestic league appearances and goals

Jesús Castro Aguirre (16 October 1908 - date of death unknown) was a Mexican amateur footballer who played as a forward. He played his club football for Club América and was an unused member of the Mexico squad for the 1930 World Cup. Castro is deceased.
