= Oscarino =

Brazilian footballer (1907–1990)

Personal information
- Full name: Oscarino Costa Silva
- Date of birth: 17 January 1907
- Place of birth: Niterói, Brazil
- Date of death: 16 September 1990 (aged 83)
- Position: Defender

Senior career*
Years	Team	Apps	(Gls)
1928–1931	Ypiranga	?	(?)
1932–1935	America-RJ	?	(?)
1935–1939	Vasco da Gama	?	(?)
1940	São Cristóvão	?	(?)

International career
1930	Brazil	1	(0)
- * Club domestic league appearances and goals

Oscarino Costa Silva, best known as Oscarino (January 17, 1907 –September 16, 1990) was a Brazilian association footballer who played in an offensive midfielder role. He was born in Niterói, Rio de Janeiro State.

During his career (1928–1940), he played for Ypiranga Niterói, América, Vasco da Gama and São Cristóvão. He participated in two squads that won two Rio de Janeiro State Championship, in 1935 and 1936. He was on the Brazilian team roster for the 1930 FIFA World Cup finals.

He died at the age of 83.

== Honours ==
=== Club ===
- Campeonato Fluminense (4):

Ypiranga: 1928, 1929, 1930, 1931

- Campeonato Carioca (2):

América: 1935
Vasco da Gama: 1936
