= Saguier Carreras =

Paraguayan footballer

Cayetano Saguier Carreras
Personal information
- Full name: Cayetano Saguier Carreras
- Place of birth: Paraguay
- Position: Forward

Senior career*
Years	Team	Apps	(Gls)
- Club Sportivo Luqueño

International career
- Paraguay
- * Club domestic league appearances and goals

Cayetano Saguier Carreras was a Paraguayan football forward who played for Paraguay in the 1930 FIFA World Cup. He also played for Club Sportivo Luqueño. Saguier is deceased.
