= Noya (given name) =

Female given name

Noya is a Hebrew name that also sounds homophonically like the similarly sounding Hebrew proper name Noʿah' (Hebrew נועה or נוח). Noa was one of the Five Daughters of Zelophehad.

In this sense, "Noʿah" and not "Noya" means "comfortable" and has absolutely nothing to do with the name Noya, which will be elaborated on below."

Persian now "نو" meaning "new".Noya is in fact originally a Hebrew name in which the “Noy” stands for beauty and the “A” stands for God, so the complete meaning of the name is the beauty of God.
