= Luis Reyes (Bolivian footballer) =

Bolivian footballer

Personal information
- Full name: Luis Reyes Peñaranda
- Date of birth: June 5, 1911
- Position: Defender

Senior career*
Years	Team	Apps	(Gls)
19??	Club Universitario		

International career
1930	Bolivia		
- * Club domestic league appearances and goals

Luis Reyes Peñaranda (June 5, 1911 – date of death unknown) was a Bolivian football defender. Reyes is deceased.

== Career ==
He was member of the Bolivia national team at the 1930 FIFA World Cup.
