= Ivan Mariz =

Brazilian footballer (1910-1982)

Personal information
- Date of birth: 16 January 1910
- Place of birth: Belém, Brazil
- Date of death: 13 May 1982 (aged 72)
- Place of death: Rio de Janeiro, Brazil
- Position: Midfielder

Senior career*
Years	Team	Apps	(Gls)
1928–1939	Fluminense	109	(3)

International career
1932	Brazil	1	(0)
- * Club domestic league appearances and goals

Ivan Mariz (January 16, 1910 – May 13, 1982) was an association footballer in midfielder role. He was born in Belém, Brazil and died in Rio de Janeiro.

He played entire career (1928–1936) at Fluminense, and won one Rio de Janeiro State Championship in 1936. For Brazilian team was in the roster for the 1930 FIFA World Cup, without playing any game. He died at 72 years old.

== Honours ==
=== Club ===
- Campeonato Carioca (1):

Fluminense: 1936

=== National ===
- Copa Roca (2):

Brazil: 1931, 1932
