= Arturo Coddou =

Chilean footballer (1907–1955)

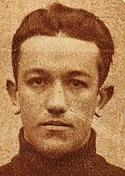
- Coddou in 1930

Personal information
- Full name: Arturo Armando Coddou Geerdts
- Date of birth: 14 January 1905
- Place of birth: Penco, Chile
- Date of death: 31 December 1954 (aged 49)
- Place of death: Concepción, Chile
- Height: 1.82 m (6 ft 0 in)
- Position: Midfielder

Senior career*
Years	Team	Apps	(Gls)
?	C.D. Arturo Fernández Vial		

International career
1930	Chile	0	(0)
- * Club domestic league appearances and goals

Arturo Armando Coddou Geerdts (14 January 1905 – 31 December 1954) was a Chilean football midfielder.
