= FIFA Women's World Cup top goalscorers =

Overview of FIFA women's cup top goalscorers

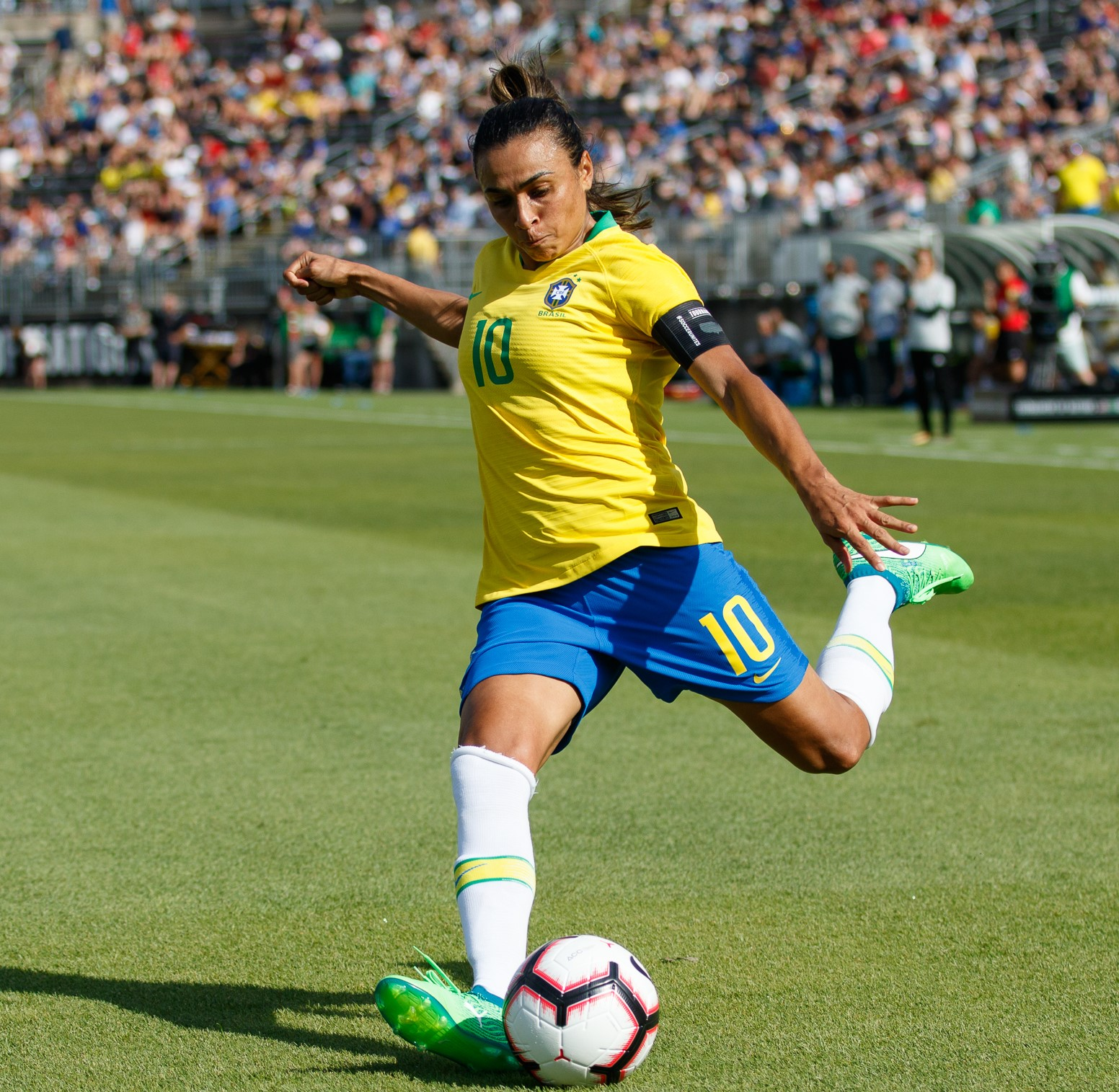
Marta holds the record for most goals scored in the FIFA Women's World Cup

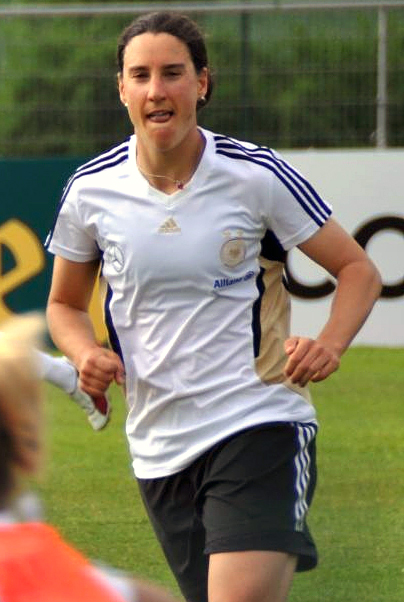
Birgit Prinz ranks second among players with the most goals, scoring 14, including one in the 2007 FIFA Women's World Cup final

A total of over 1,000 goals have been scored in games at the Women's 9 final tournaments of the FIFA Women's World Cup, not counting penalties scored during shoot-outs. Since the first goal scored by Chinese player Ma Li at the 1991 FIFA Women's World Cup, almost 440 footballers have scored goals at the World Cup tournaments, of whom 50 have scored five or more.

The top 50 goalscorers have represented 12 nations, with 11 players scoring for Germany, and another 10 for United States. In total, 27 footballers came from UEFA (Europe), 11 from CONCACAF (North America), 7 from AFC (Asia) and 5 from CONMEBOL (South America).

Michelle Akers holds the record for the most goals scored in a single tournament, with 10 goals in 1991. The players that came closest were Sissi and Sun Wen in 1999, Birgit Prinz in 2003 and Marta in 2007, with 7 goals. The lowest scoring top scorers was Homare Sawa in 2011 and Hinata Miyazawa in 2023, with five goals. Across the 9 tournaments of the World Cup, 13 footballers have been credited with the most tournament goals, and no one has achieved this feat twice. These 13 top goalscorers played for 7 nations, the most (four) for United States. Another two came from Brazil, Germany and Japan.

== Overall top goalscorers ==
Table key
♦	Denotes national top scorers (or joint top scorers) at the World Cup
#	Denotes players still active at international level
( )	Denotes tournaments where the player played in a match, but did not score a goal
†	Denotes tournaments where the player's team won the World Cup

Players with at least 8 goals at the FIFA Women's World Cup tournaments
Rank	Player	Team	Goals scored	Matches played	Goals per match	Tournaments	Notes
1	Marta^{♦#}	Brazil	17	23	0.74	2003, 2007, 2011, 2015, 2019, (2023)	list
2	Birgit Prinz^{♦}	Germany	14	24	0.58	1995, 1999, 2003^{†}, 2007^{†}, (2011)	
2	Abby Wambach^{♦}	United States	14	25	0.56	2003, 2007, 2011, 2015^{†}	list
4	Michelle Akers	United States	12	13	0.92	1991^{†}, (1995), 1999^{†}	
5	Sun Wen^{♦}	China	11	20	0.55	1991, 1995, 1999, 2003	
5	Cristiane^{#}	Brazil	11	21	0.52	(2003), 2007, 2011, (2015), 2019	list
5	Bettina Wiegmann	Germany	11	22	0.50	1991, 1995, 1999, 2003^{†}	
9	Ann Kristin Aarønes^{♦}	Norway	10	11	0.91	1995^{†}, 1999	
9	Heidi Mohr	Germany	10	12	0.83	1991, 1995	
9	Christine Sinclair	Canada	10	24	0.42	2003, 2007, 2011, 2015, 2019, (2023)	list
9	Carli Lloyd	United States	10	25	0.40	(2007), 2011, 2015^{†}, 2019^{†}	
12	Linda Medalen	Norway	9	17	0.53	1991, 1995^{†}, 1999	
12	Megan Rapinoe	United States	9	20	0.45	2011, 2015^{†}, 2019^{†}, (2023)	
12	Alex Morgan	United States	9	22	0.41	2011, 2015^{†}, 2019^{†}, (2023)	list
12	Hege Riise	Norway	9	22	0.41	1991, 1995^{†}, 1999, (2003)	
16	Célia Šašić	Germany	8	11	0.73	2011, 2015	
16	Marianne Pettersen	Norway	8	15	0.53	1995^{†}, 1999, 2003	
16	Kerstin Garefrekes	Germany	8	16	0.50	2003^{†}, 2007^{†}, 2011	
16	Liu Ailing	China	8	16	0.50	1991, 1995, 1999	
16	Eugénie Le Sommer^{♦#}	France	8	20	0.40	(2011), 2015, 2019, 2023	
16	Mia Hamm	United States	8	23	0.35	1991^{†}, 1995, 1999^{†}, 2003	
16	Homare Sawa^{♦}	Japan	8	24	0.33	(1995), (1999), 2003, (2007), 2011^{†}, (2015)	
16	Kristine Lilly	United States	8	30	0.27	(1991)^{†}, 1995, 1999^{†}, 2003, 2007	

=== Timeline ===
Key
Goal set a new record
Goal equalled the existing record

Progressive list of footballers that have held the record for most goals scored at the FIFA Women's World Cup final tournaments
Goals	Date	Player	Team	Goal	Opponent	Score	Tournament & Stage	Previous goals
1	16 November 1991	Ma Li	China	1–0	Norway	4–0	1991, China; Group stage	N/A
1	16 November 1991	Liu Ailing	China	2–0	Norway	4–0	1991, China; Group stage	N/A
2	16 November 1991	Liu Ailing	China	3–0	Norway	4–0	1991, China; Group stage	1991 vs Norway
2	17 November 1991	Heidi Mohr	Germany	3–0	Nigeria	4–0	1991, China; Group stage	1991 vs Nigeria
2	17 November 1991	Helle Jensen	Denmark	2–0	New Zealand	3–0	1991, China; Group stage	1991 vs New Zealand
2	17 November 1991	Carin Jennings	United States	2–0	Sweden	3–2	1991, China; Group stage	1991 vs Sweden
2	17 November 1991	Carolina Morace	Italy	4–0	Chinese Taipei	5–0	1991, China; Group stage	1991 vs Chinese Taipei
3	17 November 1991	Carolina Morace	Italy	5–0	Chinese Taipei	5–0	1991, China; Group stage	1991 vs Chinese Taipei (2)
4	19 November 1991	Carolina Morace	Italy	1–0	Nigeria	1–0	1991, China; Group stage	1991 vs Chinese Taipei (3)
4	19 November 1991	Heidi Mohr	Germany	3–0	Chinese Taipei	3–0	1991, China; Group stage	1991 vs Nigeria (2), Chinese Taipei
4	21 November 1991	Liu Ailing	China	4–0	New Zealand	4–1	1991, China; Group stage	1991 vs Norway (2), New Zealand
5	21 November 1991	Heidi Mohr	Germany	1–0	Italy	2–0	1991, China; Group stage	1991 vs Nigeria (2), Chinese Taipei (2)
6	24 November 1991	Heidi Mohr	Germany	2–1	Denmark	2–1	1991, China; Quarter-final	1991 vs Nigeria (2), Chinese Taipei (2), Italy
6	24 November 1991	Michelle Akers-Stahl	United States	3–0	Chinese Taipei	7–0	1991, China; Quarter-final	1991 vs Brazil, Japan (2), Chinese Taipei (2)
7	24 November 1991	Michelle Akers-Stahl	United States	5–0	Chinese Taipei	7–0	1991, China; Quarter-final	1991 vs Brazil, Japan (2), Chinese Taipei (3)
8	24 November 1991	Michelle Akers-Stahl	United States	6–0	Chinese Taipei	7–0	1991, China; Quarter-final	1991 vs Brazil, Japan (2), Chinese Taipei (4)
9	30 November 1991	Michelle Akers-Stahl	United States	1–0	Norway	2–1	1991, China; Final	1991 vs Brazil, Japan (2), Chinese Taipei (5)
10	30 November 1991	Michelle Akers-Stahl	United States	2–1	Norway	2–1	1991, China; Final	1991 vs Brazil, Japan (2), Chinese Taipei (5), Norway
10	13 June 1995	Heidi Mohr	Germany	3–0	England	3–0	1995, Sweden; Quarter-final	1991 vs Nigeria (2), Chinese Taipei (2), Italy, Denmark, United States; 1995 vs Brazil (2)
11	24 June 1999	Michelle Akers	United States	5–1	Nigeria	7–1	1999, United States; Group stage	1991 vs Brazil, Japan (2), Chinese Taipei (5), Norway (2)
12	4 July 1999	Michelle Akers	United States	2–0	Brazil	2–0	1999, United States; Semi-final	1991 vs Brazil, Japan (2), Chinese Taipei (5), Norway (2); 1999 vs Nigeria
12	10 September 2007	Birgit Prinz	Germany	8–0	Argentina	11–0	2007, China; Group stage	1995 vs Brazil; 1999 vs Brazil; 2003 vs Canada, Japan (2), Argentina, Russia (2), United States; 2007 vs Argentina (2)
13	17 September 2007	Birgit Prinz	Germany	1–0	Japan	2–0	2007, China; Group stage	1995 vs Brazil; 1999 vs Brazil; 2003 vs Canada, Japan (2), Argentina, Russia (2), United States; 2007 vs Argentina (3)
14	30 September 2007	Birgit Prinz	Germany	1–0	Brazil	2–0	2007, China; Final	1995 vs Brazil; 1999 vs Brazil; 2003 vs Canada, Japan (2), Argentina, Russia (2), United States; 2007 vs Argentina (3), Japan
14	10 July 2011	Marta	Brazil	2–1	United States	2–2 (a.e.t.)	2011, Germany; Quarter-final	2003 vs South Korea, Norway, Sweden; 2007 vs New Zealand (2), China (2), Australia, United States (2); 2011 vs Norway (2), United States
15	9 June 2015	Marta	Brazil	2–0	South Korea	2–0	2015, Canada; Group stage	2003 vs South Korea, Norway, Sweden; 2007 vs New Zealand (2), China (2), Australia, United States (2); 2011 vs Norway (2), United States (2)
16	13 June 2019	Marta	Brazil	1–0	Australia	2–3	2019, France; Group stage	2003 vs South Korea, Norway, Sweden; 2007 vs New Zealand (2), China (2), Australia, United States (2); 2011 vs Norway (2), United States (2); 2015 vs South Korea
17	18 June 2019	Marta	Brazil	1–0	Italy	1–0	2019, France; Group stage	2003 vs South Korea, Norway, Sweden; 2007 vs New Zealand (2), China (2), Australia, United States (2); 2011 vs Norway (2), United States (2); 2015 vs South Korea; 2019 vs Australia

== Top goalscorers for each tournament ==
Top goalscorers at each FIFA Women's World Cup final tournament
World Cup	Player	Team	Goals scored	Matches played	Golden Boot	Other FIFA Awards
China 1991	Michelle Akers-Stahl	United States	10	6	Yes	Silver Ball
Sweden 1995	Ann Kristin Aarønes	Norway	6	6	Yes	Bronze Ball
United States 1999	Sissi	Brazil	7	6	Yes	Silver Ball
United States 1999	Sun Wen	China	7	6	Yes	Golden Ball
United States 2003	Birgit Prinz	Germany	7	6	Yes	Golden Ball
China 2007	Marta	Brazil	7	6	Yes	Golden Ball
Germany 2011	Homare Sawa	Japan	5	6	Yes	Golden Ball
Canada 2015	Célia Šašić	Germany	6	7	Yes	
Canada 2015	Carli Lloyd	United States	6	7	No	Silver Boot, Golden Ball
France 2019	Megan Rapinoe	United States	6	6	Yes	Golden Ball
France 2019	Alex Morgan	United States	6	6	No	Silver Boot
France 2019	Ellen White	England	6	6	No	Bronze Boot
Australia/New Zealand 2023	Hinata Miyazawa	Japan	5	5	Yes	

== Goalscorers at multiple tournaments ==
Players who scored at 3 or more separate World Cups
Rank	Player	Team	Tournaments with goals	Goals scored	Matches played	Goals per match	Tournaments with goals
1	Marta	Brazil	5	17	23	0.74	2003, 2007, 2011, 2015, 2019
1	Christine Sinclair	Canada	5	10	24	0.42	2003, 2007, 2011, 2015, 2019
2	Birgit Prinz	Germany	4	14	24	0.58	1995, 1999, 2003, 2007
2	Abby Wambach	United States	4	14	25	0.56	2003, 2007 2011, 2015
2	Sun Wen	China	4	11	20	0.55	1991, 1995, 1999, 2003
2	Bettina Wiegmann	Germany	4	11	22	0.50	1991, 1995, 1999, 2003
2	Mia Hamm	United States	4	8	23	0.35	1991, 1995, 1999, 2003
2	Kristine Lilly	United States	4	8	30	0.27	1995, 1999, 2003, 2007
2	Julie Foudy	United States	4	4	24	0.17	1991, 1995, 1999, 2003
3	Linda Medalen	Norway	3	9	17	0.53	1991, 1995, 1999
3	Marianne Pettersen	Norway	3	8	15	0.53	1995, 1999, 2003
3	Cristiane	Brazil	3	11	21	0.52	2007, 2011, 2019
3	Kerstin Garefrekes	Germany	3	8	16	0.50	2003, 2007, 2011
3	Liu Ailing	China	3	8	16	0.50	1991, 1995, 1999
3	Lisa De Vanna	Australia	3	7	15	0.47	2007, 2011, 2015
3	Victoria Sandell Svensson	Sweden	3	6	13	0.46	1999, 2003, 2007
3	Megan Rapinoe	United States	3	9	20	0.45	2011, 2015, 2019
3	Alex Morgan	United States	3	9	22	0.41	2011, 2015, 2019
3	Hege Riise	Norway	3	9	22	0.41	1991, 1995, 1999
3	Isabell Herlovsen	Norway	3	6	15	0.40	2007, 2015, 2019
3	Eugénie Le Sommer	France	3	8	20	0.40	2015, 2019, 2023
3	Carli Lloyd	United States	3	10	25	0.40	2011, 2015, 2019
3	Tiffeny Milbrett	United States	3	7	18	0.39	1995, 1999, 2003
3	Alexandra Popp	Germany	3	7	18	0.39	2015, 2019, 2023
3	Fara Williams	England	3	5	13	0.38	2007, 2011, 2015
3	Pretinha	Brazil	3	5	14	0.36	1995, 1999, 2007
3	Aya Miyama	Japan	3	6	17	0.35	2007, 2011, 2015
3	Asisat Oshoala	Nigeria	3	3	10	0.30	2015, 2019, 2023
3	Hannah Wilkinson	New Zealand	3	3	11	0.27	2011, 2015, 2023
3	Lieke Martens	Netherlands	3	4	16	0.25	2015, 2019, 2023
3	Yūki Nagasato	Japan	3	4	16	0.25	2007, 2011, 2015
3	Solveig Gulbrandsen	Norway	3	4	19	0.21	1999, 2003, 2015
3	Simone Laudehr	Germany	3	3	15	0.20	2007, 2011, 2015
3	Jill Scott	England	3	4	21	0.19	2007, 2011, 2019
3	Joy Fawcett	United States	3	3	23	0.13	1991, 1995, 1999

== See also ==
- List of FIFA Women's World Cup own goals
- List of FIFA Women's World Cup hat-tricks
