= Julio Quintana (politician) =

Argentine politician and activist

Julio Oscar Quintana is an Argentine activist in the Workers' Party. He was elected as a provincial deputy in Salta Province in the provincial capital.
