= Alexis Chantraine =

Belgian footballer

Personal information
- Full name: Joseph Dieudonné Alexis Chantraine
- Date of birth: 16 March 1901
- Place of birth: Bressoux, Belgium
- Date of death: 24 April 1987 (aged 86)
- Position: Outside right

Senior career*
Years	Team	Apps	(Gls)
1919–1937	Royal FC Liegeois	368	(6)

Managerial career
- 1946–1947: Royal FC Liegeois
- * Club domestic league appearances and goals

Joseph Dieudonné Alexis Chantraine (French pronunciation: [ʒozɛf djødɔne alɛksi ʃɑ̃tʁɛn]; 16 March 1901, in Bressoux, Belgium – 24 April 1987, in Liège) was a Belgian footballer.

An outside-right for Royal FC Liegeois, he played 382 matches there, and he was selected for the first World Cup in 1930, but did not play.
