= Julio Quintana (footballer) =

Peruvian footballer (1904-1981)

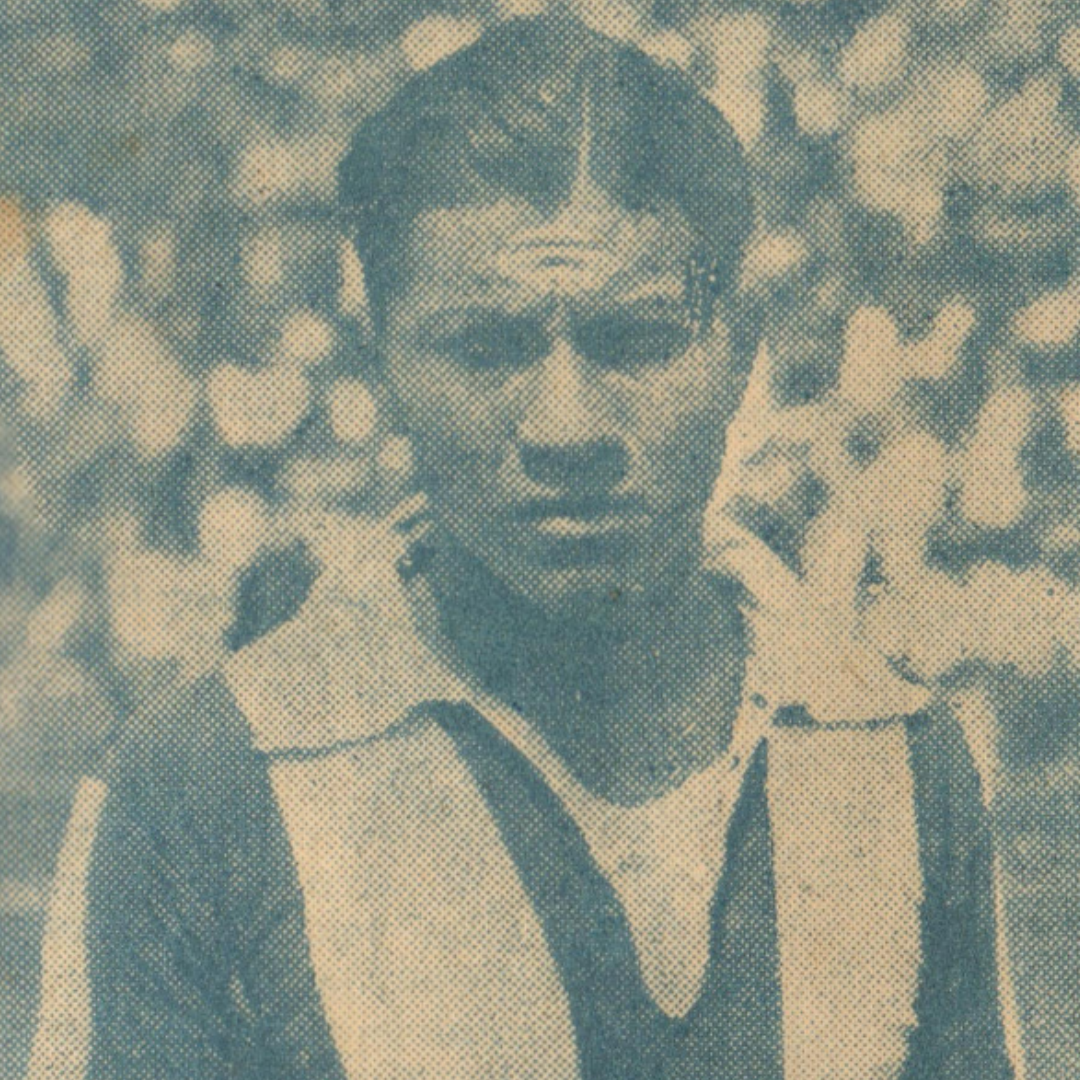

Personal information
- Full name: Julio Gilberto Quintana Calmet
- Date of birth: 13 July 1904
- Place of birth: Peru
- Date of death: 16 June 1981 (aged 76)
- Place of death: Lima, Peru
- Position: Midfielder

Senior career*
Years	Team	Apps	(Gls)
1925–1934	Alianza Lima	63	(0)

International career
- Peru

Managerial career
- 1937–1940: Alianza Lima
- * Club domestic league appearances and goals

Julio Gilberto Quintana Calmet (July 13, 1904 - June 16, 1981) was a Peruvian football midfielder who played for Peru in the 1930 FIFA World Cup. He also played for Alianza Lima.
