= Francisco Aguirre (Paraguayan footballer) =

Paraguayan footballer

Personal information
- Full name: Francisco Aguirre
- Date of birth: 30 November 1907
- Place of birth: Paraguay
- Position: Midfielder

International career
| Years | Team | Apps | (Gls) |
- Paraguay

Francisco Aguirre (born 30 November 1907, date of death unknown) was a Paraguayan footballer that played as a midfielder. Aguirre was part of the Paraguay national football team that participated in the 1930 FIFA World Cup. During most of his career he played for Olimpia Asunción. Aguirre is deceased.
