= Nicolas Hoydonckx =

Belgian footballer

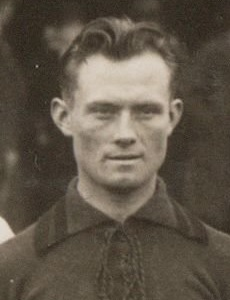

Personal information
- Full name: Nicolas Huibrecht Hoydonckx
- Date of birth: 29 December 1900
- Place of birth: Zolder, Belgium
- Date of death: 4 February 1985 (aged 84)
- Place of death: Hasselt, Belgium
- Position: Defender

Senior career*
Years	Team	Apps	(Gls)
1920–1928	Berchem Sport		
1928–1933	Hasselt		
1933–1936	Tilleur		

International career
1928–1933	Belgium	36	(0)
- * Club domestic league appearances and goals

Nicolas H. Hoydonckx (29 December 1900 – 4 February 1985) was a Belgian football (soccer) player in defender role.

In career he played for clubs Berchem, Royal Excelsior Hasselt and Tilleur. For Belgium national football team he got 36 international caps from 1928 to 1933, and participated at the 1928 Summer Olympics and the 1930 FIFA World Cup.
