= José Miracca =

Paraguayan footballer (1903–??)

Personal information
- Full name: José León Miracca
- Date of birth: 23 September 1903
- Place of birth: Paraguay
- Position: Defender

Senior career*
Years	Team	Apps	(Gls)
1930	Club Nacional		
1932	Tigre	6	(0)

International career
1924–1931	Paraguay	4	(0)
- * Club domestic league appearances and goals

José León Miracca (born 23 September 1903, date of death unknown) was a Paraguayan football defender who played for Paraguay in the 1930 FIFA World Cup. He also played for Club Nacional. Miracca is deceased.
