= Quiterio Olmedo =

Paraguayan footballer

Personal information
- Full name: Quiterio Ermes Olmedo
- Date of birth: 21 December 1907
- Place of birth: Paraguay
- Position: Defender

Senior career*
Years	Team	Apps	(Gls)
- Club Nacional

International career
- Paraguay
- * Club domestic league appearances and goals

Quiterio Ermes Olmedo (born 21 December 1907, date of death unknown) was a Paraguayan football defender who played for Paraguay in the 1930 FIFA World Cup. He also played for Club Nacional. Olmedo is deceased.
