= Théodore Nouwens =

Belgian footballer

Personal information
- Date of birth: 17 February 1908
- Place of birth: Mechelen, Belgium
- Date of death: 21 December 1974 (aged 66)
- Position: Defender

Senior career*
| Years | Team | Apps | (Gls) |
| 1923–1937 | FC Malines | | |

International career
| 1928–1933 | Belgium | 23 | (0) |
- * Club domestic league appearances and goals

Théodore Nouwens (17 February 1908 – 21 December 1974) was a Belgian international footballer who participated at the 1930 FIFA World Cup.
