= Gerardo Romero =

Paraguayan footballer

Personal information
- Date of birth: 30 November 1905
- Place of birth: Paraguay
- Position: Forward

Senior career*
Years	Team	Apps	(Gls)
- Club Libertad

International career
- Paraguay
- * Club domestic league appearances and goals

Gerardo Romero (born 30 November 1905, date of death unknown) was a Paraguayan football forward who played for Paraguay in the 1930 FIFA World Cup. He also played for Club Libertad. Romero is deceased.
