= Henri De Deken =

Belgian footballer

Personal information
- Full name: Henri M. J. de Deken
- Date of birth: 3 August 1907
- Place of birth: Schoten, Belgium
- Date of death: 12 February 1960 (aged 52)
- Height: 1.80 m (5 ft 11 in)
- Position: Defender

Senior career*
Years	Team	Apps	(Gls)
1924–1937	Royal Antwerp		
1937–1941	Antwerp Boys		
1941–1942	Olympic Charleroi		

International career
1930–1933	Belgium	11	(0)
- * Club domestic league appearances and goals

Henri M. J. de Deken (3 August 1907 in Schoten – 12 February 1960) was a Belgian association football player in defender role. In career he played mostly for Royal Antwerp F.C. For Belgium national football team he was in roster for 1930 FIFA World Cup, played one match with Paraguay, losses 0–1. He was also part of Belgium's team at the 1928 Summer Olympics, but he did not play in any matches.
