= Santiago Benítez =

Paraguayan footballer (1903–1997)

Personal information
- Full name: Santiago Benítez
- Date of birth: 1903
- Place of birth: Paraguay
- Date of death: 1997 (aged 93–94)
- Position: Midfielder

International career
Years	Team	Apps	(Gls)
- Paraguay

Santiago Benítez (1903–1997) was a Paraguayan footballer that played as a midfielder.

== Career ==
Benítez was part of the Paraguay national football team that participated in the 1930 FIFA World Cup. During most of his career he played for Olimpia Asunción and was a key member of the three consecutive national championships obtained by Olimpia in 1927, 1928 and 1929.
