= César Espinoza (Chilean footballer) =

Chilean footballer (1908–1993)

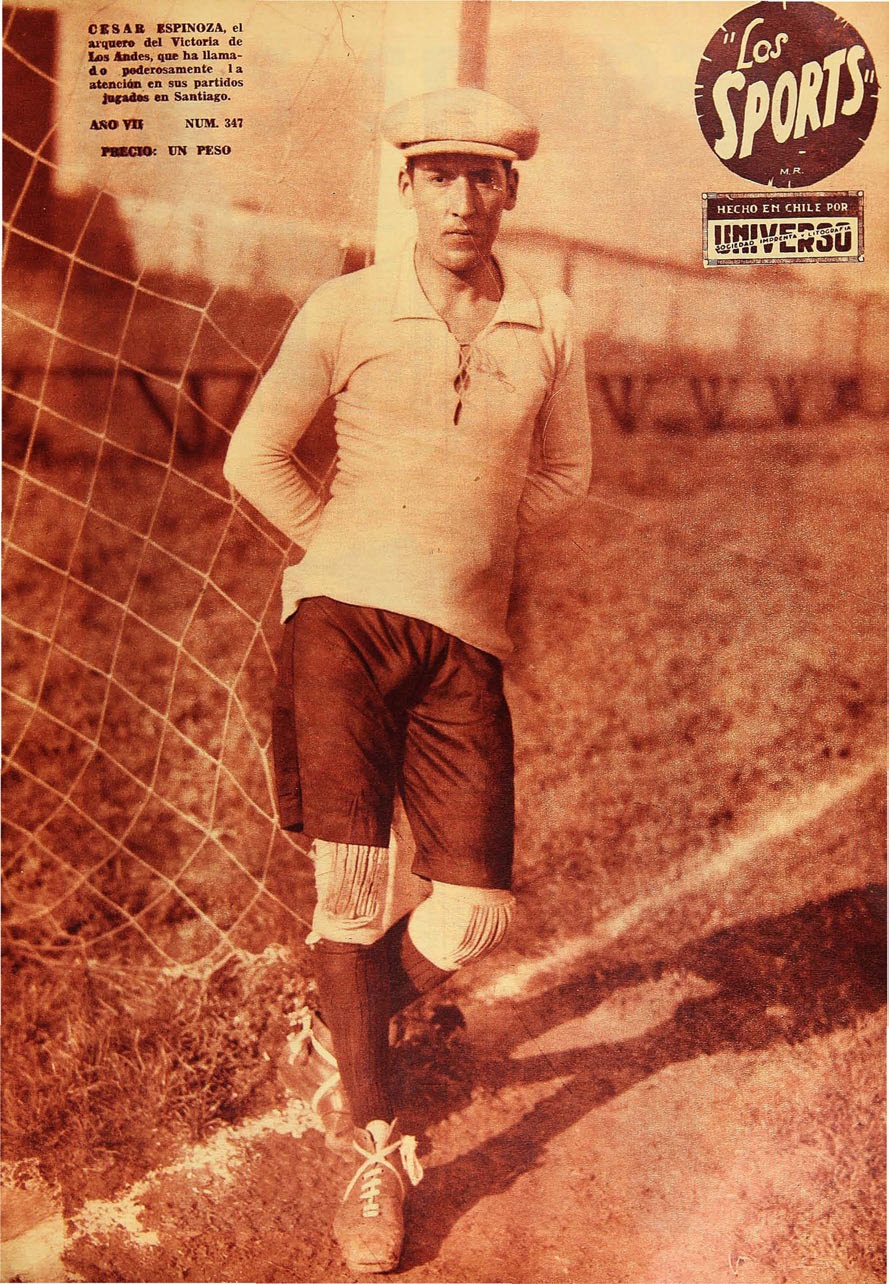

Personal information
- Full name: César Augusto Eliécer Espinoza del Canto
- Date of birth: 31 May 1908
- Place of birth: Los Andes, Chile
- Date of death: 31 October 1956 (aged 48)
- Place of death: San Bernardo, Chile
- Height: 1.70 m (5 ft 7 in)
- Position: Goalkeeper

Senior career*
Years	Team	Apps	(Gls)
- Santiago National

International career
1930	Chile	1	(0)
- * Club domestic league appearances and goals

César Espinoza del Canto (31 May 1908 – 31 October 1956) was a Chilean football goalkeeper.
