= Jean De Clercq =

Belgian footballer

Jean de Clercq
Personal information
- Full name: Jean de Clercq
- Date of birth: 17 May 1905
- Place of birth: Antwerp, Belgium
- Date of death: 20 March 1984 (aged 78)
- Position: Midfielder

Senior career*
Years	Team	Apps	(Gls)
1919–1924	Beerschot VAV		
1925–1938	Royal Antwerp F.C.		

International career
1930–1933	Belgium	11	(0)

Managerial career
- 1949–1953: Royal Antwerp F.C. (with Richard Gedopt)
- * Club domestic league appearances and goals

Jean de Clercq (17 May 1905, in Antwerp, Belgium – 20 March 1984) was a Belgian footballer.

He played as a midfielder for Royal Antwerp F.C., where he played 219 league games and for the Belgium team. He was named to the squad for the 1930 World Cup in Montevideo.

He was coach of the Great Old from 1949 to 1953, with the former goalkeeper for the club, Richard Gedopt.

== Honours ==
- International from 1930 to 1933 (11 caps)
- Played in the 1930 World Cup (1 match)
- Champion of Belgium in 1929 and 1931 with Royal Antwerp F.C.
