= Eusebio Díaz =

Paraguayan footballer (1901–1959)

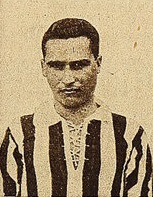

Personal information
- Date of birth: 21 June 1901
- Place of birth: Paraguay
- Date of death: 1959 (aged 57–58)
- Position: Midfielder

Senior career*
Years	Team	Apps	(Gls)
- Club Guaraní

International career
- Paraguay
- * Club domestic league appearances and goals

Eusebio Díaz (21 June 1901 – 1959) was a Paraguayan football midfielder who played for Paraguay in the 1930 FIFA World Cup. He also played for Club Guaraní.
