= Arnold Badjou =

Belgian footballer (1909–1994)

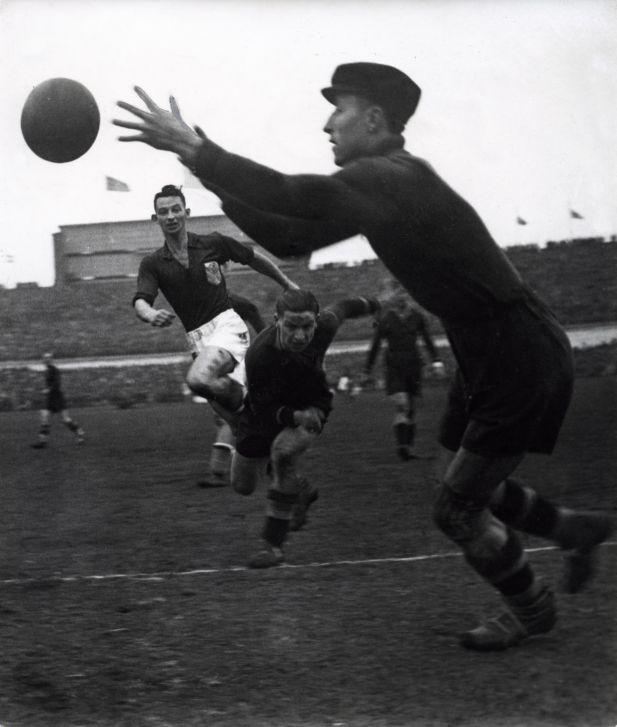
- Badjou with Belgium against the Netherlands in 1935

Personal information
- Full name: Arnold Jules Élie Badjou
- Date of birth: 25 June 1909
- Place of birth: Brussels, Belgium
- Date of death: 17 September 1994 (aged 85)
- Height: 1.74 m (5 ft 9 in)
- Position: Goalkeeper

Senior career*
Years	Team	Apps	(Gls)
1928–1941	Daring		

International career
1930–1939	Belgium	34	(0)
- * Club domestic league appearances and goals

Arnold Jules Élie Badjou (25 June 1909 – 17 September 1994) was a Belgian football goalkeeper.

He played his entire career (1929–1938) at Daring. He was in the Belgium national football team squads in 1930, 1934 and 1938 FIFA World Cups and played 3 matches in the 1930 and 1938 editions. Badjou was the last surviving member of Belgium's 1930 World Cup squad.
