= Constantino Noya =

Bolivian footballer

Personal information
- Full name: Constantino Jesús Noya
- Place of birth: Bolivia
- Position: Midfielder

Senior career*
Years	Team	Apps	(Gls)
1929–1930	Oruro Royal	?	(?)

International career
1930	Bolivia	0	(0)
- * Club domestic league appearances and goals

Constantino Jesús Noya was a Bolivian football midfielder.

== Career ==
During his career he has convocated without appearances for the Bolivia national team at the 1930 FIFA World Cup. He has passed his career with the Oruro Royal. Noya is deceased.
