= Miguel Murillo (Bolivian footballer) =

Bolivian footballer (1898-1968)

Personal information
- Full name: Miguel Murillo
- Date of birth: 24 March 1898
- Place of birth: La Paz, Bolivia
- Date of death: 12 February 1968 (aged 69)
- Height: 1.72 m (5 ft 8 in)
- Position: Goalkeeper

Senior career*
| Years | Team | Apps | (Gls) |
- Club Bolívar

International career
- Bolivia
- * Club domestic league appearances and goals

Miguel Murillo (1898–1968) was a Bolivian footballer who played as a goalkeeper for Bolivia in the 1930 FIFA World Cup he also kept the most clean sheets in football history with anywhere between 600 and 650. He spent his career playing for Club Bolívar.
