= Milan Stojanović (Yugoslavian footballer) =

Yugoslav footballer

Personal information
- Date of birth: 28 December 1911
- Place of birth: Belgrade, Kingdom of Serbia
- Date of death: 18 June 1985 (aged 73)
- Position: Goalkeeper

Senior career*
Years	Team	Apps	(Gls)
1929-1931	BSK Beograd		
- * Club domestic league appearances and goals

Milan Stojanović (28 December 1911-18 June 1985) was a Yugoslav association football goalkeeper. He was member of the Yugoslavia national team at the 1930 FIFA World Cup, but was never capped for his country. Stojanović is deceased.
