= Salvador Flores (footballer) =

Paraguayan footballer

Personal information
- Date of birth: 1906
- Place of birth: Paraguay
- Position: Defender

Senior career*
Years	Team	Apps	(Gls)
- Cerro Porteño

International career
- Paraguay
- * Club domestic league appearances and goals

Salvador Flores (born 1906, date of death unknown) was a Paraguayan football defender who played for Paraguay in the 1930 FIFA World Cup. He also played for Cerro Porteño. Flores is deceased.
