= Tranquilino Garcete =

Paraguayan footballer

Personal information
- Date of birth: 1907
- Place of birth: Paraguay
- Date of death: November 1st, 2000
- Position: Midfielder

Senior career*
Years	Team	Apps	(Gls)
1930	Club Libertad		
1932–1933	Atlanta		(0)
1934	Atlanta-Argentinos Juniors	2	(0)
1935	Atlanta		(0)

International career
- Paraguay
- * Club domestic league appearances and goals

Tranquilino Garcete (1907–November 1, 2000) was a Paraguayan football midfielder who played for Paraguay in the 1930 FIFA World Cup. He also played for Club Libertad. In Argentina, he played in Atlanta (1932, 1933 and 1935), and the fusion Atlanta-Argentinos Juniors in 1934. Garcete is deceased.
