= Pedro Benítez (footballer, born 1901) =

Paraguayan footballer

Personal information
- Full name: Pedro Manuel Benítez Arpolda
- Date of birth: 12 January 1901
- Place of birth: Luque, Paraguay
- Date of death: 31 January 1974 (aged 73)
- Place of death: Luque, Paraguay
- Height: 1.66 m (5 ft 5 in)
- Position: Goalkeeper

Senior career*
Years	Team	Apps	(Gls)
1928–1931	Libertad		
1932	Atlanta	9	(0)

International career
1930	Paraguay	1	(0)
- * Club domestic league appearances and goals

Pedro Manuel Benítez Arpolda (12 January 1901 – 31 January 1974) was a Paraguayan football goalkeeper. In 1930, he played in the FIFA World Cup in Uruguay, for the Paraguayan team. In 1932, he played 9 matches in the Club Atlético Atlanta, in the Argentinian First League. This club, in those years, was contracted a complete team of Paraguayan footballers.
