= 1930 FIFA World Cup Group 1 =

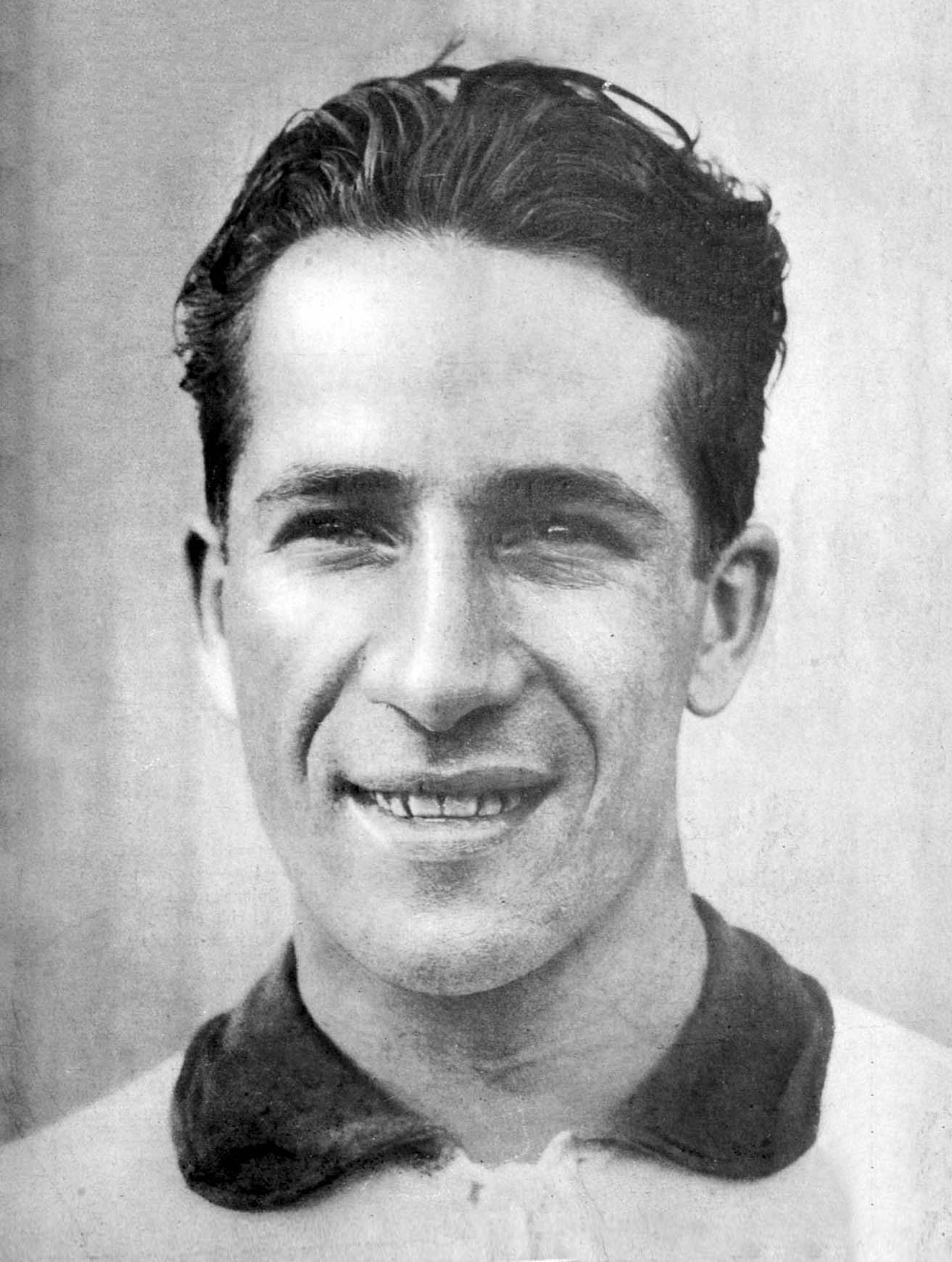
Guillermo Stábile scored five times for Argentina in Group 1 as he went on to win the FIFA World Cup Golden Boot

Group 1 of the 1930 FIFA World Cup was one of four groups in the opening round of tournament. The group featured Argentina, Chile, France and Mexico. Play began on 13 July 1930 when France defeated Mexico 4–1 in the opening match. Lucien Laurent scored the first goal in World Cup history after 19 minutes to give his side the lead. France played again in the second fixture, suffering defeat against Argentina in a controversial match which saw the referee mistakenly blow the whistle for full-time six minutes early.

Chile defeated Mexico 3–0 in the two sides' first World Cup match, before Chile eliminated France in their next game with a 1–0 victory in a match which featured the first penalty kick awarded in World Cup history, Carlos Vidal's effort was saved by French goalkeeper Alex Thépot. Argentina defeated Mexico 6–3 in the group's next match in which Guillermo Stábile scored a hat-trick on his international debut. Play concluded on 22 July 1930 with Argentina playing Chile to determine the group winner for a place in the semi-finals. Stábile added two more goals as his side won 3–1 to win the group and advance. Chile, France and Mexico were subsequently eliminated from the competition. Argentina went on to reach the final, losing 4–2 to hosts Uruguay.

== Background ==
Group 1 was one of four groups in the opening round of the 1930 FIFA World Cup in Uruguay. The competition featured 13 sides, split into one group of four teams and three groups of three teams. The sides would play each other on a round-robin basis with the top nation in each group advancing to the semi-finals. There was no qualification process for the competition, instead all 41 member states of governing body FIFA were invited to participate. However, the choice of Uruguay as host nation resulted in most declining to participate due to costs and the length of travel involved.

The tournament did prove popular with teams from the Americas and 9 of the 13 participants came from the region. Three of these, Argentina, Chile and Mexico were placed into Group 1 along with one of the four European entrants, France. Argentina were one of the favourites for the tournament having reached the final of the 1928 Olympics before being beaten by Uruguay. Mexico, in contrast, were relatively unknown as their football association had only been founded three years prior to the tournament and their only international victories had come against Guatemala. France had been reluctant to enter but had been persuaded by FIFA president Jules Rimet, a Frenchman, to participate, although coach Gaston Barreau and leading player Manuel Anatol both refused to travel.

== Standings ==
| Pos | Team | Pld | W | D | L | GF | GA | GD | Pts | Qualification |
|---|---|---|---|---|---|---|---|---|---|---|
| 1 | Argentina | 3 | 3 | 0 | 0 | 10 | 4 | +6 | 6 | Advance to the knockout stage |
| 2 | Chile | 3 | 2 | 0 | 1 | 5 | 3 | +2 | 4 | |
| 3 | France | 3 | 1 | 0 | 2 | 4 | 3 | +1 | 2 | |
| 4 | Mexico | 3 | 0 | 0 | 3 | 4 | 13 | −9 | 0 | |

Source: ESPN

== Matches ==
=== France vs Mexico ===
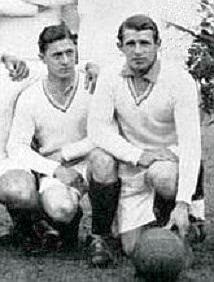
Lucien Laurent and Marcel Langiller, the scorers of the first and second goals in World Cup history

This was the first ever meeting between the two sides, and would be one of the two opening games of the tournament, starting at the same time as the United States against Belgium match in Group 4. France had been chosen for the opening match to mark Bastille Day the following day. There had been some snowfall prior to the start of the competition, leaving the conditions cold and wintery. France opened the scoring after 19 minutes, Lucien Laurent converting a cross from Ernest Libérati to score the first goal in World Cup history. The French goalkeeper Alex Thépot was forced off the field with injury during the first half after being kicked in the jaw during a challenge with an opposition player. With no substitutions allowed, halfback Augustin Chantrel was chosen to play in his place for the remainder of the match. Despite their man disadvantage, France extended their lead twice before half-time; Marcel Langiller made it 2–0 before André Maschinot added a third shortly before the break.

Mexico looked to push forward in the second half and were able to score their first goal of the competition when Juan Carreño finished from Dionisio Mejía's pass. However, it proved to be only a consolation goal as France scored a fourth in the final minutes of the game, Maschinot scoring his second after Langiller had played a cross into the penalty area. Mexico's Manuel and Felipe Rosas became the first brothers to play together in a World Cup during the game. The match would remain the highest scoring World Cup opening match until Germany defeated Costa Rica 4–2 in the opening game of the 2006 World Cup.

13 July 1930
15:00 UYT (UTC−03:30)

| France | 4–1 | Mexico |
|---|---|---|
| L. Laurent 19'; Langiller 40'; Maschinot 43', 87' | | Carreño 70' |

Estadio Pocitos, Montevideo
Attendance: 4,444
Referee: Domingo Lombardi (Uruguay)

France
Mexico

| GK | Alex Thépot |
| FB | Étienne Mattler |
| FB | Marcel Capelle |
| HB | Augustin Chantrel |
| HB | Alexandre Villaplane (c) |
| HB | Edmond Delfour |
| FW | Marcel Pinel |
| FW | Lucien Laurent |
| FW | André Maschinot |
| FW | Ernest Libérati |
| FW | Marcel Langiller |
Manager:
Jacques Caudron

| GK | Óscar Bonfiglio |
| FB | Rafael Garza (c) |
| FB | Manuel Rosas |
| HB | Efraín Amézcua |
| HB | Alfredo Sánchez |
| HB | Felipe Rosas |
| FW | Hilario López |
| FW | José Ruíz |
| FW | Dionisio Mejía |
| FW | Juan Carreño |
| FW | Luis Pérez |
Manager:
Juan Luque de Serrallonga

Linesmen:
Henri Christophe (Belgium)
Almeida Rêgo (Brazil)

=== Argentina vs France ===
Unusually, France played their next match 48 hours later, this time meeting Argentina in their opponent's first game. This was the first ever meeting between the two sides. Despite his injury in the previous game, Thépot started in goal for the French but his side suffered another injury in the opening minutes of the match when Luis Monti heavily tackled Laurent resulting in the French player spending the rest of the game limping and ineffective. The Argentinians were the stronger of the two sides and only the goalkeeping of Thépot was able to keep them from scoring for much of the game. However, his resilience came to an end in the 81st minute when Monti scored direct from a free-kick with Thépot's view blocked by his teammates assembling a wall.

France immediately pushed for an equaliser with Langiller breaking through the Argentine defence in the 84th minute. However, Brazilian referee Almeida Rêgo blew his whistle to signal full-time despite having six minutes of regular time remaining. The French players immediately accosted the referee but it took several minutes for order to be restored as mounted police tried to clear celebrating Uruguayan and Argentine fans from the pitch and Roberto Cherro received treatment after fainting. Eventually, the match resumed but France were unable to find an equalising goal as the match ended 1–0.

15 July 1930
16:00 UYT (UTC−03:30)

| Argentina | 1–0 | France |
|---|---|---|
| Monti 81' |

Estadio Parque Central, Montevideo
Attendance: 23,409
Referee: Almeida Rêgo (Brazil)

Argentina
France

| GK | 1 | Ángel Bossio |
| FB | 2 | José Della Torre |
| FB | 3 | Ramón Muttis |
| HB | 4 | Juan Evaristo |
| HB | 5 | Luis Monti |
| HB | 6 | Arico Suárez |
| FW | 7 | Natalio Perinetti |
| FW | 8 | Francisco Varallo |
| FW | 9 | Manuel Ferreira (c) |
| FW | 10 | Roberto Cherro |
| FW | 11 | Mario Evaristo |
Manager:
Juan José Tramutola

| GK | 1 | Alex Thépot |
| FB | 2 | Étienne Mattler |
| FB | 3 | Marcel Capelle |
| HB | 4 | Augustin Chantrel |
| HB | 5 | Alexandre Villaplane (c) |
| HB | 6 | Edmond Delfour |
| FW | 7 | Marcel Pinel |
| FW | 8 | Lucien Laurent |
| FW | 9 | André Maschinot |
| FW | 10 | Ernest Libérati |
| FW | 11 | Marcel Langiller |
Manager:
Raoul Caudron

Linesmen:
Ulises Saucedo (Bolivia)
Costel Rădulescu (Romania)

=== Chile vs Mexico ===
This was the first ever meeting between the two sides. Carlos Vidal gave Chile an early advantage, scoring a low shot into the bottom corner of the net from 12 yards after only four minutes following a headed layoff by Eberardo Villalobos. Mexico appealed for a handball by Vidal but this was dismissed by referee Henri Christophe. There were numerous further chances in the first half; both sides struck the woodwork, first Chile's Guillermo Subiabre hit the crossbar with a long-range drive before Mexico's Efraín Amézcua hit the post. The Asociación Nacional de Fútbol Profesional noted that the Mexicans had surprised the Chilean side, prompting manager György Orth to reorganise his team and berate his forwards.

Early in the second half, Chile extended their lead when Mexican defender Manuel Rosas became the first player to score an own goal in the World Cup when he inadvertently headed the ball into his own net. Rosas had been attempting to head Villalobos' throw in. Unusually, this made Rosas the youngest player ever to score at a World Cup despite doing so in the wrong goal, a record which stood until the 1958 World Cup when it was beaten by Pelé. (Note: Some sources claim that Rosas was 22 at the time of the tournament, this article uses the official FIFA listing.) Vidal rounded out the scoring for his side late on, scoring his second and Chile's third. The goal came from a quick breakaway by Guillermo Saavedra who ran 30 metres and passed to Tomás Ojeda, who played in Vidal to finish from four yards out.

16 July 1930
14:45 UYT (UTC−03:30)

| Chile | 3–0 | Mexico |
|---|---|---|
| Vidal 3', 65' (Note: This is one of several goals for which the statistical details are disputed. The goalscorers and timings used here are those of FIFA, the official record. Some other sources, such as RSSSF, state a different scorer, timing, or both.); M. Rosas 52' (o.g.) |

Estadio Parque Central, Montevideo
Attendance: 9,249
Referee: Henri Christophe (Belgium)

Chile
Mexico

| GK | Roberto Cortés |
| FB | Ulises Poirier |
| FB | Víctor Morales |
| HB | Arturo Torres |
| HB | Guillermo Saavedra |
| HB | Humberto Elgueta |
| FW | Tomás Ojeda |
| FW | Guillermo Subiabre |
| FW | Eberardo Villalobos |
| FW | Carlos Vidal |
| FW | Carlos Schneeberger (c) |
Manager:
(Hungary) György Orth

| GK | Isidoro Sota |
| FB | Rafael Garza (c) |
| FB | Manuel Rosas |
| HB | Efraín Amézcua |
| HB | Alfredo Sánchez |
| HB | Felipe Rosas |
| FW | Hilario López |
| FW | Roberto Gayón |
| FW | José Ruiz |
| FW | Juan Carreño |
| FW | Luis Pérez |
Manager:
Juan Luque de Serrallonga

Linesmen:
Martin Aphesteguy (Uruguay)
John Langenus (Belgium)

=== Chile vs France ===
This was the first ever meeting between the two sides, and served as the first part of a doubleheader at the recently completed Estadio Centenario, the centrepiece stadium for the competition which had been delayed due to construction issues. Chile started the stronger of the two sides, forcing several saves from Thépot in the French goal, and were awarded a penalty in the first half, the first in World Cup history. Vidal took the kick but his effort was saved by Thépot. France's best chance of the half came from an error by Chilean defender Guillermo Riveros but his goalkeeper Roberto Cortés managed to recover the ball from the oncoming attackers to end the danger. The French resistance was eventually broken in the 64th minute when Guillermo Subiabre headed in for Chile from a cross by Vidal. The score remained 1–0, eliminating France from the competition and giving Chile their first clean sheet in an international fixture at the 42nd attempt.

19 July 1930
12:50 UYT (UTC−03:30)

| Chile | 1–0 | France |
|---|---|---|
| Subiabre 67' |

Estadio Centenario, Montevideo
Attendance: 2,000
Referee: Anibal Tejada (Uruguay)

Chile
France

| GK | Roberto Cortés |
| FB | Ernesto Chaparro |
| FB | Guillermo Riveros |
| HB | Arturo Torres |
| HB | Guillermo Saavedra |
| HB | Casimiro Torres |
| FW | Tomás Ojeda |
| FW | Guillermo Subiabre |
| FW | Eberardo Villalobos |
| FW | Carlos Vidal |
| FW | Carlos Schneeberger (c) |
Manager:
(Hungary) György Orth

| GK | Alex Thépot |
| FB | Marcel Capelle |
| FB | Étienne Mattler |
| HB | Augustin Chantrel |
| HB | Célestin Delmer |
| HB | Alexandre Villaplane (c) |
| FW | Ernest Libérati |
| FW | Edmond Delfour |
| FW | Marcel Pinel |
| FW | Emile Veinante |
| FW | Marcel Langiller |
Manager:
Raoul Caudron

Linesmen:
Domingo Lombardi (Uruguay)
Almeida Rêgo (Brazil)

=== Argentina vs Mexico ===
This was the first ever meeting between the two sides and served as the second part of the double header after the France against Chile match played earlier in the day. With captain Manuel Ferreira having returned home to sit a law exam, Guillermo Stábile was selected in attack for Argentina to make his international debut. He led his side into an early lead, scoring twice in the opening 17 minutes either side of a goal by teammate Adolfo Zumelzú. Argentina had a chance to add a fourth five minutes later when they were awarded a penalty after a handball, but Fernando Paternoster's effort was saved by Oscar Bonfiglio. Some sources have stated that Paternoster, disagreeing with the decision to award a penalty and in the spirit of fair play, deliberately hit the ball weakly to Bonfiglio. While the referee, also conceding his decision to award the penalty was incorrect, deliberately extended his stride to measure the distance for the spot kick, leaving Paternoster four yards further away than required.

Mexico pulled a goal back shortly before half-time; Manuel Rosas became the first person to score a penalty at a World Cup when he converted his effort. Argentina added two more goals in the early stages of the second half, Francisco Varallo scored his first goal of the competition before Zumelzú scored his second two minutes later. Mexico were awarded a second penalty in the 72nd minute, Rosas' initial effort was saved by Ángel Bossio, deputising as captain in Ferreira's absence, in the Argentine goal but he was able to convert the rebound. This spurred the Mexicans on and they scored a third soon after through Roberto Gayón to bring the score to 5–3. However, Stábile completed his hat-trick shortly after to end Argentina's nerves as the match finished 6–3, eliminating Mexico.

19 July 1930
15:00 UYT (UTC−03:30)

| Argentina | 6–3 | Mexico |
|---|---|---|
| Stábile 8', 17', 80'; Zumelzú 12', 55'; Varallo 53' | | M. Rosas 42' (pen.), 65'; Gayón 75' |

Estadio Centenario, Montevideo
Attendance: 42,100
Referee: Ulises Saucedo (Bolivia)

Argentina
Mexico

| GK | Ángel Bossio (c) |
| FB | José Della Torre |
| FB | Fernando Paternoster |
| HB | Alberto Chividini |
| HB | Adolfo Zumelzú |
| HB | Rodolfo Orlandini |
| FW | Carlos Peucelle |
| FW | Francisco Varallo |
| FW | Guillermo Stábile |
| FW | Attilio Demaría |
| FW | Carlos Spadaro |
Manager:
Juan José Tramutola

| GK | Oscar Bonfiglio |
| FB | Rafael Garza (c) |
| FB | Manuel Rosas |
| HB | Francisco Garza |
| HB | Alfredo Sánchez |
| HB | Raymundo Rodríguez |
| FW | Felipe Olivares |
| FW | Felipe Rosas |
| FW | Hilario López |
| FW | Roberto Gayón |
| FW | Juan Carreño |
Manager:
Juan Luque de Serrallonga

Linesmen:
Gualberto Alonso (Uruguay)
Costel Rădulescu (Romania)

=== Argentina vs Chile ===
This was the 18th meeting between the two sides in international competition, with Chile having never beaten Argentina in their previous fixtures. The match would determine which team would win the group and advance to the semi-finals. Stábile continued his good form from the previous match by scoring twice in the opening 15 minutes, although Chile pulled a goal back almost immediately through Subiabre. Shortly before halftime, Monti came together with Casimiro Torres, bringing down the Chilean with a heavy tackle, which led to a mass brawl between the two sides. Referee John Langenus later described the aftermath of the tackle: "the Chilean grabbed hold of Monti's head with one hand and, with the other, delivered a vicious uppercut". The brawl quickly spread to the rest of the teams, with Langenus noting "All at once, every Argentinian player seemed to throw themselves upon the nearest Chilean and engage in 11 separate boxing matches". Officials and police desperately tried to restore order and the half was eventually brought to and end with the score remaining 2–1.

Despite the tensions in the first half, the second saw no repeat of any animosity. Argentina extended their lead in the 51st minute when Mario Evaristo scored. Bossio produced several saves to deny Chile any further goals as Argentina secured a 3–1 victory, advancing them to the semi-finals and eliminating Chile.

22 July 1930
14:45 UYT (UTC−03:30)

| Argentina | 3–1 | Chile |
|---|---|---|
| Stábile 12', 13'; M. Evaristo 51' | | Subiabre 15' |

Estadio Centenario, Montevideo
Attendance: 41,459
Referee: John Langenus (Belgium)

Argentina
Chile

| GK | | Ángel Bossio |
| FB | | José Della Torre |
| FB | | Fernando Paternoster |
| HB | | Juan Evaristo |
| HB | | Luis Monti |
| HB | | Rodolfo Orlandini |
| FW | | Carlos Peucelle |
| FW | | Francisco Varallo |
| FW | | Guillermo Stábile |
| FW | | Manuel Ferreira (c) |
| FW | 11 | Mario Evaristo |
Manager:
Juan José Tramutola

| GK | Roberto Cortés |
| FB | Ernesto Chaparro |
| FB | Víctor Morales |
| HB | Arturo Torres |
| HB | Guillermo Saavedra |
| HB | Casimiro Torres |
| FW | Guillermo Arellano |
| FW | Guillermo Subiabre (c) |
| FW | Eberardo Villalobos |
| FW | Carlos Vidal |
| FW | Juan Aguilera |
Manager:
(Hungary) György Orth

Linesmen:
Henri Christophe (Belgium)
Ulises Saucedo (Bolivia)

== Aftermath ==
Argentina's three victories saw them finish top of Group 1 with six points, advancing them to the semi-finals. Chile finished second with four points, France came third with two points while Mexico finished last after losing all three matches. Argentina went on to play the United States in the semi-finals, securing a comfortable 6–1 victory to reach the first World Cup final against hosts Uruguay. Despite taking a 2–1 lead, Argentina went on to lose the final 4–2. Stábile's five goals in Group 1 contributed to him winning the Golden Boot as the tournament's highest goalscorer, finishing with eight.

France returned to the World Cup four years later, being defeated in the first round by Austria. Following their elimination, Chile did not player another international match for five years and would not appear at another World Cup finals until 1950. Mexico would also not return to the World Cup until 1950.

== See also ==
- Argentina at the FIFA World Cup
- Chile at the FIFA World Cup
- France at the FIFA World Cup
- Mexico at the FIFA World Cup
