= List of Mexico national football team managers =

The following is a list of Mexico national football team managers.

The first manager in team history was Adolfo Frías Beltrán. The current manager of the Mexico national team is former international Rafael Márquez, who replaced Javier Aguirre, in July 2026.

== Managers ==
Manager	Career	Matches managed	Won	Drawn	Lost	Win %
(Mexico) Adolfo Frías Beltrán	1923	6	4	1	1	66.6
(Mexico) Alfonso Rojo de la Vega	1928	2	0	2	0	00.0
(Spain) Juan Luque de Serrallonga	1930	3	0	0	3	00.0
(Mexico) Rafael Garza Gutiérrez	1934, 1937–1938, 1949	16	14	1	1	87.5
(Mexico) Alfred C. Crowle	1935	5	5	0	0	100.0
(Hungary) György Orth	1947	2	2	0	0	100.0
(Mexico) Abel Ramírez Herrera	1948	1	0	0	1	00.0
(Mexico) Octavio Vial	1950	5	0	1	4	00.0
(Spain) Antonio López Herranz	1950, 1952, 1953–1954, 1956–1958	22	9	10	3	40.9
(Mexico) Horacio Casarín	1953	1	1	0	0	100.0
(Mexico) Ignacio Trelles	1958, 1960–1969, 1975–1976	106	50	27	29	47.1
(Mexico) Fernando Marcos	1959	3	3	0	0	100.0
(Hungary) Árpád Fekete	1963	3	1	1	1	33.3
(Mexico) Raúl Cárdenas	1968, 1969, 1970, 1979–1981	59	25	20	14	42.3
(Mexico) Diego Mercado	1969	5	1	2	2	20.0
(Mexico) Javier de la Torre	1970–1973	38	20	7	11	52.6
(Mexico) Ignacio Jáuregui	1974	3	2	1	0	66.6
(Mexico) José Antonio Roca	1977–1978	20	11	3	6	55.0
(Mexico) José Moncebáez	1979	3	1	1	1	33.3
(Mexico) Gustavo Peña	1979	1	1	0	0	100.0
(Socialist Federal Republic of Yugoslavia) Bora Milutinović	1983–1986, 1995–1997	104	52	32	20	50.0
(Mexico) Mario Velarde	1987–1989	15	13	0	2	86.6
(Mexico) Alberto Guerra	1989	3	3	0	0	100.0
(Mexico) Manuel Lapuente	1990–1991, 1997–2000	67	33	18	16	49.2
(Mexico) Luis Fernando Tena	1991, 2011, 2013	5	1	0	4	14.2
(Argentina) César Luis Menotti	1991–1992	19	7	7	5	36.8
(Argentina) Vicente Cayetano Rodríguez	1992	1	1	0	0	100.0
(Mexico) Miguel Mejía Barón	1993–1995, 2017	54	25	17	12	46.2
(Brazil) Ricardo Ferretti	1993, 2015, 2018	11	4	2	5	36.3
(Mexico) Mario Carrillo	1999	1	0	0	1	00.0
(Mexico) Gustavo Vargas	1999	2	1	1	0	50.0
(Mexico) Enrique Meza	2000–2001, 2010	20	5	4	11	25.0
(Mexico) Hugo Sánchez	2000, 2006–2008	28	15	4	9	53.6
(Mexico) Javier Aguirre	2001–2002, 2009–2010, 2024–2026	98	60	20	18	61.2
(Argentina) Ricardo La Volpe	2002–2006	71	38	16	17	61.0
(Mexico) Jesús Ramírez	2008	5	4	0	1	80.0
(Sweden) Sven-Göran Eriksson	2008–2009	13	6	1	6	46.1
(Mexico) Efraín Flores	2010	3	1	1	1	33.3
(Mexico) José Manuel de la Torre	2011–2013	47	27	12	8	65.9
(Mexico) Víctor Manuel Vucetich	2013	2	1	0	1	50.0
(Mexico) Miguel Herrera	2013–2015	36	19	10	7	52.7
(Colombia) Juan Carlos Osorio	2015–2018	52	33	9	10	63.4
(Argentina) Gerardo Martino	2019–2022	66	42	12	12	63.6
(Argentina) Diego Cocca	2023	7	3	3	1	42.8
(Mexico) Jaime Lozano	2023–2024	21	10	4	7	47.6
(Mexico) Rafael Márquez	2026–	6	1	2	3	16.7

Current as of 18 November 2026
