= Jacques Caudron =

French footballer and manager (1882–1938)

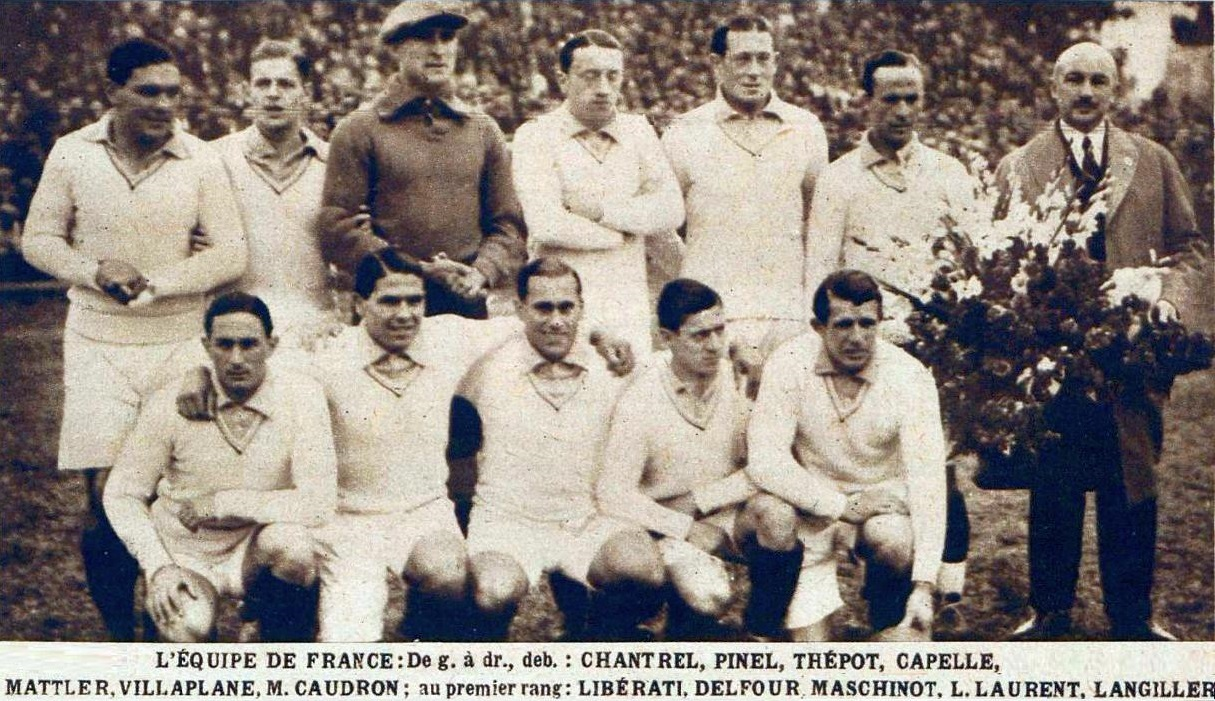
- Caudron with the bouquet

Personal information
- Full name: Raoul Jacques Caudron
- Date of birth: 8 July 1882
- Place of birth: 17th arrondissement of Paris, France
- Date of death: 25 February 1938 (aged 55)
- Place of death: La Garenne-Colombes, France
- Position: Goalkeeper

Senior career*
Years	Team	Apps	(Gls)
1896–?	Standard AC		
- US Sotteville
?–1900	FC Rouen		

Managerial career
- 1930: France (3)
- * Club domestic league appearances and goals

Raoul Jacques Caudron (8 July 1882 – 25 February 1938) was a French footballer and manager who is best known for being in charge of the French national team in the first FIFA World Cup in 1930.

== Sporting career ==
=== Early career ===
Born in the 17th arrondissement of Paris on 8 July 1882, (Note: Some sources wrongly state that he was born on 2 December 1883.) Caudron played as a goalkeeper for the second team of Standard AC in October 1896, aged 14. Still before 1900, he also played as a goalkeeper for US Sotteville and FC Rouen.

In 1928, Caudron became the delegate of the FFF's Federal Bureau, which held plenary sessions to ratify the decisions made by the selection committee of the French national team. Even though the delegate did not have the right to vote, he was known for taking his position very seriously, taking "notes of his impressions on the behavior and morale of the footballers he monitored in a small notebook". In February 1929, he was one of the three delegates representing the federation that attended a match between France B and Luxembourg.

In February 1930, Caudron accompanied the French national team on a trip by train to Porto for a friendly match against Portugal; in one of the stops, the players managed to buy a goat to serve as their mascot, but when the ticket collector demanded payment for the place occupied by the goat, it was Caudron, as the manager in charge of accounts, who had to pay for it, but he remained inflexible despite the players' pleas, because for him "a penny is a penny", and thus the separation from the goat took place at the next stop.

=== 1930 World Cup ===
In the summer of 1930, Caudron was a member of the French delegation that went to the 1930 FIFA World Cup in Uruguay, which also included 16 players, the president of the FFF Jules Rimet, a masseur Raphaël Panosetti, and referee Georges Balvay, but the coach Gaston Barreau was absent. Barreau had always been against French participation in the World Cup because he considered his team so weak that "it could only make a fool of itself in Uruguay, so he decided to stay in his homeland with the pretext that he had been held up by his position at the Paris Conservatory of Music due to his employers refusing to grant him a two months' leave. Therefore, it fell to Caudron, who had been a member of France's selection committee since 1928, to replace Barreau as the coach of France. He supervised the players in Montevideo, sounding the alarm every morning to demand "everyone to spend half an hour of physical training together", which seems a very amateurish tactic, and in fact, the French midfielder Célestin Delmer later stated that "Caudron was only a leader, not a coach. It was two or three influential players who took charge of the team's training".

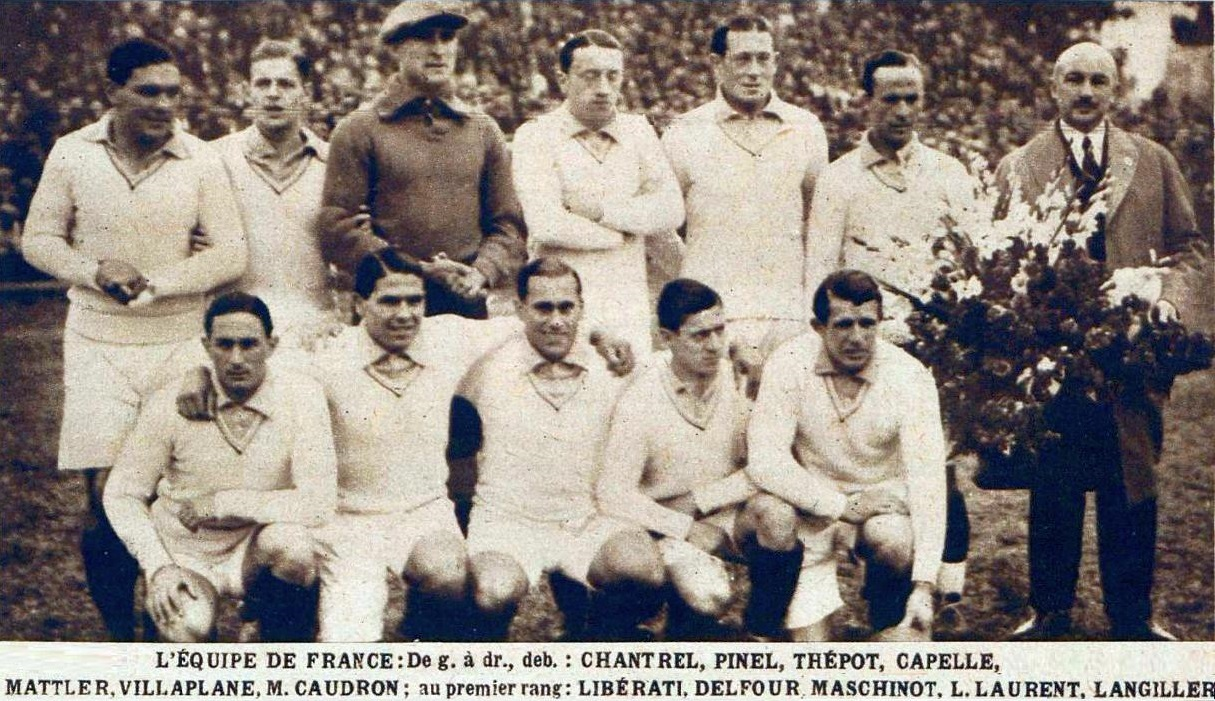
Caudron (with the bouquet) and the French national team ahead of their match against Argentina.

In the joint-opening match of the tournament, Caudron led France to a 4–1 victory over Mexico at the Estadio Pocitos. Two days later, on 15 July, France faced group favorites Argentina, and even though they were hindered by injuries, they lost only by 0–1, and that too from an 81st-minute Luis Monti free-kick. France's final match, against Chile on 19 July, featured the first penalty kick of the World Cup, and Alex Thépot became the first goalkeeper to save a penalty, but they still lost 0–1, again due to a free-kick. After the World Cup, Caudron coached France in three unofficial matches against Nacional Montevideo, Santos FC, and Brazil, winning the former and losing the latter two. Caudron then wrote a letter about their trip to Brazil, in which he praised its stadiums ("the soil is excellent and grassy") and its women ("the bathers returned from the beach in their bathing suits").

The French press praised the performance of its national team, which was not humiliating like Barreau had predicted. Thus, years later, in 1954, he stated in the press that he was responsible for forming the teams that lined up in the World Cup, and recounts all three matches in detail as if he had been there, without ever mentioning Caudron's name, who had already died in 1938.

== Later life and death ==
In February 1936, his 14-year-old son Jacques was one of the 66 readers of the French newspaper L'Auto who participated in the so-called "Invisible Athletes Game", a "Sherlock Holmes-type" football charade organized by L'Auto; the winners were Caudron and Pierre Besset, who did not even had 30 years between them, and their award was a ticket to a England-Austria match in May in Vienna.

Caudron died in La Garenne-Colombes on 25 February 1938, at the age of 55.
