= Ernest Libérati =

French footballer (1908-1983)

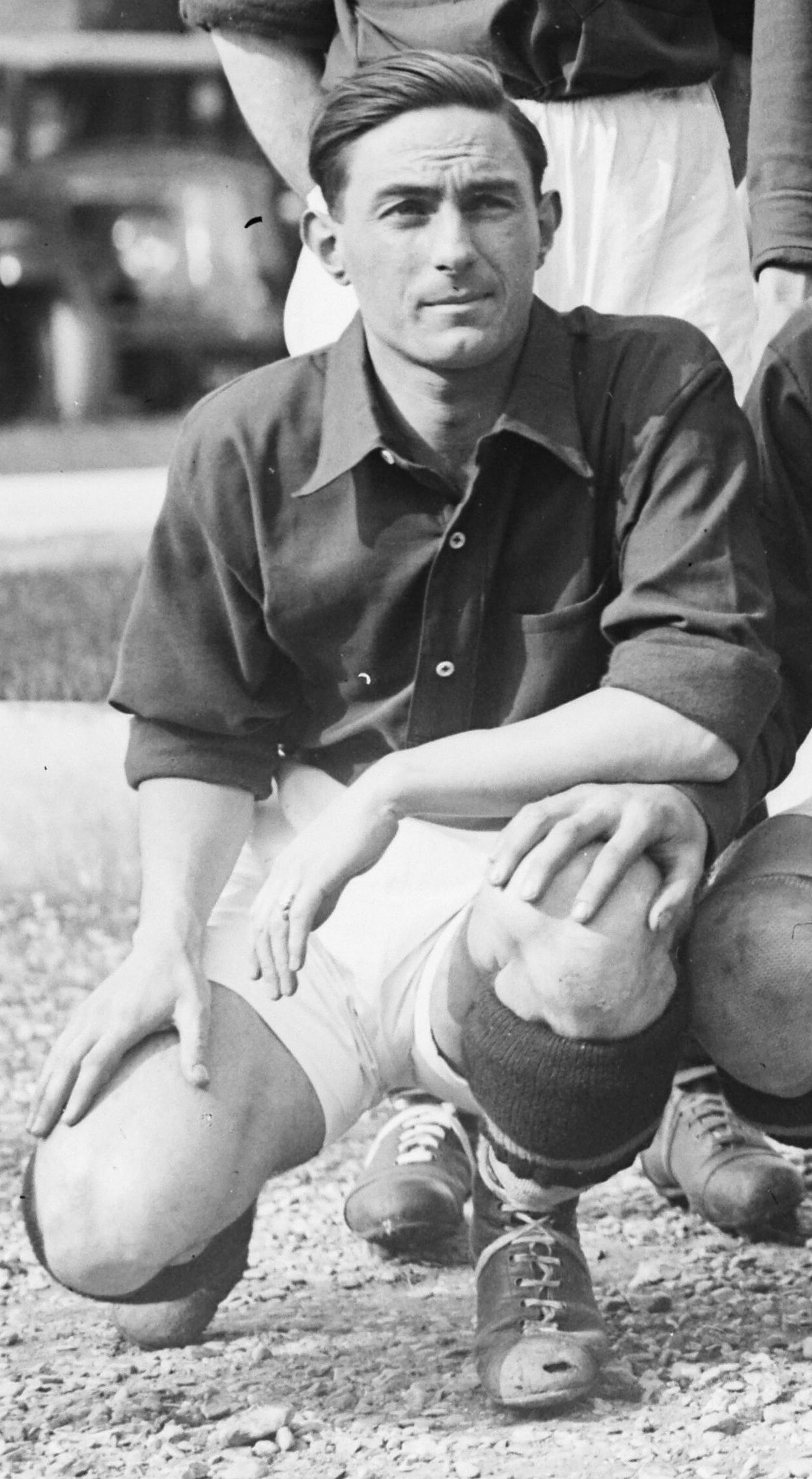
- Libérati with Amiens in 1930

Personal information
- Full name: Ernest Libérati
- Date of birth: 22 March 1908
- Place of birth: Oran, French Algeria
- Date of death: 2 June 1983 (aged 77)
- Height: 1.72 m (5 ft 8 in)
- Position: Striker

Senior career*
| Years | Team | Apps | (Gls) |
| 1929–1932 | Amiens | | |
| 1932–1934 | SC Fives | | |
| 1934–1935 | Olympique Lillois | | |
| 1935–1936 | Sochaux | | |
| 1936–1938 | Valenciennes | | |
| ?-? | ESA Brive | | |

International career
| 1930–1934 | France | 19 | (4) |

Managerial career
- ?–?: ESA Brive
- * Club domestic league appearances and goals

Ernest Libérati (22 March 1908 – 2 June 1983) was a French footballer. He played as a forward. He was part of the France national football team at the FIFA World Cup 1930. He provided the first ever FIFA World Cup assist against Mexico.

== Club career ==
He started his career at Amiens in 1929.

In 1932, the start of professionalism in France, he became himself a professional in SC Fives. He played one season for Olympique Lillois, in 1934-1935.

In 1935 he went to Sochaux, but only stayed one year. He ended his professional career in Valenciennes, from 1936 to 1938.

He then played for lower league club ESA Brive and was its coach at the same time. A stadium was named after him in Brive

== International career ==
Libérati earned his first cap for France against Portugal on 23 February 1930, and scored his first goal against Switzerland during his second appearance on 23 March 1930.

Libérati was selected for the 1930 FIFA World Cup. He played in all three of France's matches. During the first match of the competition against Mexico on 13 July 1930, he provided the first ever assist in the history of the World Cup for his teammate Lucien Laurent, who scored the first ever goal of the competition.

In total, Libérati earned nineteen caps and scored four goals for France. His final cap and goal came on 15 April 1934 against Luxembourg. This was France's only match for 1934 FIFA World Cup qualification, which they won 6–1 to qualify. Libérati was not part of the France squad for the final tournament.

== Managerial career ==
His only coaching experience was at ESA Brive where he also played at the same time. A local stadium was named after him.
