= Felipe Rosas =

Mexican footballer (1910-1986)

Personal information
- Full name: Felipe Rosas Sánchez
- Date of birth: 5 February 1910
- Place of birth: Mexico City, Mexico
- Date of death: 17 June 1986 (aged 76)
- Place of death: Mexico
- Height: 1.75 m (5 ft 9 in)
- Position: Midfielder

Senior career*
Years	Team	Apps	(Gls)
1929–1935	Atlante		

International career
1930–1935	Mexico	11	(2)
Medal record
Representing Mexico
Men's Football
Central American and Caribbean Games
Gold medal – first place	1935 El Salvador	Team competition
- * Club domestic league appearances and goals

Felipe Rosas Sánchez (5 February 1910 – 17 June 1986) was a Mexican professional footballer, who was part of the Mexican soccer team in the 1930 FIFA World Cup played in Uruguay. He, with his brothers, Manuel Rosas and Juan Rosas, were footballers in the Atlante Futbol Club, from Mexico City, and as fellow goalkeeper Oscar Bonfiglio once wrote: "he was the best of us".

== Honours ==
Mexico

- Central American and Caribbean Games Gold Medal: 1935
