= Roberto Cortés =

Roberto Cortés may refer to:

- Roberto Carlos Cortés (born 1977), Colombian football defender
- Roberto Cortés (Chilean footballer) (1902–1975), Chilean football goalkeeper
