= Doca (footballer) =

Brazilian footballer (1905-1988)

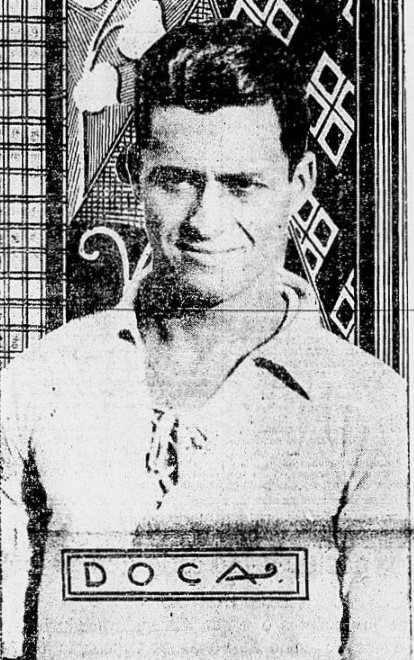
- Doca in 1930

Personal information
- Full name: Alfredo de Almeida Rêgo
- Date of birth: 14 May 1905
- Place of birth: Sant'Ana do Livramento, Rio Grande do Sul, Brazil
- Date of death: 30 July 1988 (aged 83)
- Place of death: Rio de Janeiro, Brazil
- Height: 6 ft 1 in (1.85 m)
- Position: Striker

Senior career*
Years	Team	Apps	(Gls)
1923–1925	Mackenzie	?	(?)
1926–1932	São Cristovao	?	(?)
1933–1935	Flamengo	30	(6)

International career
1930	Brazil	1	(1)
- * Club domestic league appearances and goals

Alfredo "Doca" de Almeida Rêgo (14 May 1905 Sant'Ana do Livramento, Rio Grande do Sul, Brazil – 30 July 1988, Rio de Janeiro, Brazil) was a Brazilian football player. He played for the Brazil national team. He was part of the delegation of the national team at the 1930 World Cup, but he was not included in the squad of 22 players, as was Humberto de Araujo Benevenuto.

His older brother Gilberto de Almeida Rego was referee for 3 matches and linesman for 2 at the 1930 World Cup. Gilberto was also a member of the Comissão Técnica of the Brazil national team in the tournament.

From 1923 to 1935, Doca played for SC Mackenzie, São Cristóvão and Flamengo. In 1926, Doca's club São Cristóvão became the Carioca champion for the only time in its history.

Doca only played one match for Seleção. After the 1930 World Cup, Brazil played a match against the USMNT in Rio. Brazil won 4–3, Doca scored one goal.

Alfredo de Almeida Rego was one of the leaders of the São Cristóvão basketball team. The club was the Carioca champion for two consecutive years, in 1929 and 1930. The team captain was Alfredo's older brother, football referee Gilberto de Almeida Rego. Another brother, Ary de Almeida Rego, also played on the team.

Alfredo de Almeida Rego lived longer than all of these brothers, he died of sepsis on 30 July 1988, in Rio de Janeiro. The incorrect date of Alfredo's death in 1956 is most likely related to another brother, Moacyr de Almeida Rego, who died on July 4, 1956, of myocardial infarction.

== Club ==
- Campeonato Carioca (1):

São Cristóvão: 1926
