= Marcel Pinel =

French footballer (1908–1968)

Personal information
- Date of birth: 8 July 1908
- Place of birth: Honfleur, France
- Date of death: 18 March 1968 (aged 59)
- Height: 1.73 m (5 ft 8 in)
- Positions: Centre-half; centre-forward

Senior career*
Years	Team	Apps	(Gls)
- CS Honfleur
- Paris Université Club
- Stade Français
1925–1935	Red Star		

International career
1930	France	7	(4)
- * Club domestic league appearances and goals

Marcel Pinel (8 July 1908 – 18 March 1968) was a French professional footballer who played as a centre-half and centre-forward. He was a France international.

== Biography ==
Born in Honfleur, Pinel started at the club in his home town, Honfleur, and after being transferred to Paris Université Club and Stade Français, in 1925, he joined Red Star Olympique where he played centre-forward and centre-half.

At this time, he played for France seven times (1930) and scored four goals. These four goals were scored against Belgium in two games (two doubles).

His first cap came against Brazil, in Rio de Janeiro, which resulted in a 3–2 defeat, but this match is not recognised by the French. Therefore, his first official selection came against Czechoslovakia in a 3–2 loss in Colombes.

He took part in the first World Cup, in 1930, in Uruguay, after having asked for exceptional permission to do his military service in Douanes. With his former teammate at Red Star, Augustin Chantrel, the other intellectual in the France team, he was correspondent for the sporting newspaper L'Auto to cover the tournament.

In 1932, French football became officially professional, and he played in the first national championship. Relegated to Division 2, the audoniens won their championship the following season, and returned to the top flight. Marcel Pinel played until 1935 at Red Star.

A stadium is named after him in his home town of Honfleur.

== Honours ==
Red Star

- Division 2: 1933–34
