= Casimiro Torres (Chilean footballer) =

Chilean footballer (1905–1977)

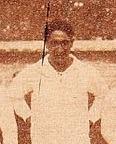

Personal information
- Full name: Casimiro Torres Saavedra
- Date of birth: 4 March 1905
- Place of birth: Chile
- Date of death: 17 November 1977 (aged 72)
- Place of death: Chile
- Position: Midfielder

Senior career*
| Years | Team | Apps | (Gls) |
| 1928-? | Everton | | |

International career
| 1930 | Chile | 2 | (0) |
- * Club domestic league appearances and goals

Casimiro Torres Saavedra (4 March 1905 – 17 November 1977) was a Chilean football player who played as a midfielder.

== Career ==
He played for Everton de Viña del Mar from 1928 in the Asociación de Football de Valparaíso, becoming the team captain.

At international level, he represented Chile in the 1930 FIFA World Cup.
