= Francisco Garza =

Mexican footballer (1904-1965)

Personal information
- Full name: Francisco Garza Gutiérrez
- Date of birth: March 14, 1904
- Place of birth: Mexico City, Mexico
- Date of death: October 30, 1965 (aged 61)
- Place of death: Mexico City, Mexico
- Position: Defender

International career
Years	Team	Apps	(Gls)
1930	Mexico	1	(0)

Francisco Garza Gutiérrez (14 March 1904 – 30 October 1965) was a Mexican footballer who played as a defender. He represented Mexico at the 1930 FIFA World Cup alongside his brother Rafael, playing once against Argentina.
