= José Ruiz (footballer, born 1904) =

Mexican footballer (born 1904)

Personal information
- Date of birth: 1904
- Place of birth: Mexico City, Mexico
- Position: Forward

International career
Years	Team	Apps	(Gls)
1930	Mexico	2	(0)

José Ruiz (born 1904, date of death unknown) was a Mexican football forward who made two appearances for Mexico at the 1930 FIFA World Cup. Ruiz is deceased.
