= Tomás Ojeda =

Chilean footballer (1910-1983)

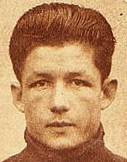

Personal information
- Full name: Tomás Ojeda Álvarez
- Date of birth: 20 April 1910
- Place of birth: Chile
- Date of death: 20 February 1983 (aged 72)
- Position: Forward

Senior career*
Years	Team	Apps	(Gls)
1930	Boca Juniors of Antofagasta		

International career
1930	Chile	2	(0)
- * Club domestic league appearances and goals

Tomás Ojeda Álvarez (20 April 1910 – 20 February 1983) was a Chilean football attacker. He played in the 1930 World Cup. He played in the Chilean league in Boca Juniors of Antofagasta.
