= Raymundo Rodríguez =

Mexican footballer (born 1905)

Personal information
- Full name: Raymundo Rodríguez González
- Date of birth: April 15, 1905
- Place of birth: Mexico
- Position: Midfielder

International career
Years	Team	Apps	(Gls)
- Mexico

Raymundo Rodríguez González (15 April 1905 - date of death unknown), nicknamed Mapache, was a Mexican footballer who played as a midfielder. Rodríguez is deceased.

== Career ==
Rodríguez participated in the 1930 FIFA World Cup. He played only in one game in the tournament, a match against Argentina. During this period, his club was Marte FC.

== Sources ==
- A.Gowarzewski : "FUJI Football Encyclopedia. World Cup FIFA*part I*Biographical Notes - Heroes of Mundials"; GiA Katowice 1993
- Match report
