= Carlos Schneeberger =

Chilean footballer (1902–1973)

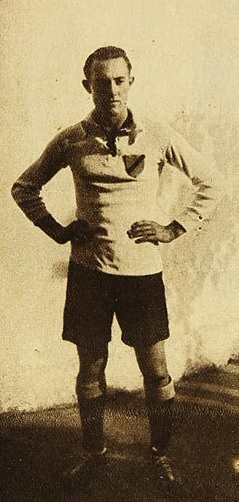

Personal information
- Full name: Carlos Alberto Schneeberger Lemp
- Date of birth: 21 June 1902
- Place of birth: Lautaro, Chile
- Date of death: 1 October 1973 (aged 71)
- Place of death: Temuco, Chile
- Position: Forward

Senior career*
Years	Team	Apps	(Gls)
1930-?	Colo-Colo		

International career
1928–1930	Chile	5	(0)
- * Club domestic league appearances and goals

Carlos Alberto Schneeberger Lemp (21 June 1902 – 1 October 1973) was a Chilean football attacker. He was born in Lautaro, and died, aged 71, in Temuco. He was part of Chile's team at the 1928 Summer Olympics, and captained Chile at the 1930 World Cup.
