= Marcel Capelle =

French footballer (1904-1996)

Personal information
- Full name: Auguste Marcel Capelle
- Date of birth: 25 February 1904
- Place of birth: Paris, France
- Date of death: 8 April 1996 (aged 92)
- Place of death: Espalion,France
- Height: 1.76 m (5 ft 9 1/2 in)
- Position: Defender

Senior career*
Years	Team	Apps	(Gls)
1929–1933	RC France	?	(?)
1933–1934	Sète	?	(?)
1934–1935	Saint-Étienne	?	(?)
1935–1936	Stade de Reims	?	(?)

International career
1930–1931	France	9	(0)

Managerial career
- 1947-1949: US Espalionnaise
- * Club domestic league appearances and goals

Auguste Marcel Capelle (25 February 1904 – 8 February 1996) was a professional French association footballer who played in defence. He played at the 1930 FIFA World Cup.

== Club career ==
- 1929–1933 : RC Paris
- 1933–1934 : FC Sète
- 1934–1935 : AS Saint-Étienne
- 1935–1936 : Stade de Reims

== International career ==
He was capped 9 times with France national football team. His first cap was against Belgium on 13/04/1930. His last cap was against England on 14/05/1931.

He was part of France squad for the 1930 FIFA World Cup, and played France’s all 3 matches in the tournament.

== Honours ==
=== Sète ===
- Division 1 : 1933-1934
