= Efraín Amézcua =

Mexican footballer (1907-1970)

Efraín Amezcua
Personal information
- Date of birth: 3 August 1907
- Place of birth: León, Guanajuato, Mexico
- Date of death: 15 September 1970 (aged 63)
- Position: Midfielder

International career
Years	Team	Apps	(Gls)
1930	Mexico	2	(0)

Efraín Amezcua (3 August 1907 - 15 September 1970) was a Mexican football midfielder who made two appearances for the Mexico national team at 1930 FIFA World Cup.
