= Benevenuto (footballer) =

Brazilian footballer (1904–1949)

Benvenuto
Personal information
- Full name: Humberto de Araújo Benvenuto
- Date of birth: 4 December 1904
- Place of birth: Rio de Janeiro, Brazil
- Date of death: 24 June 1949 (aged 44)
- Place of death: Rio de Janeiro, Brazil
- Position: Defender

Senior career*
Years	Team	Apps	(Gls)
1921	Américano	?	(?)
1922–1923	Jequiá	?	(?)
1923–1929	Flamengo	119	(13)
1929–1930	Atlético Mineiro	?	(?)
1930	Botafogo	?	(?)
1931–1932	Flamengo	?	(?)
1933	Peñarol	?	(?)
1933	Palestra Itália	?	(?)
1934–1935	Botafogo	?	(?)
1935	Brasil-RJ	?	(?)
1935	Carioca-RJ	?	(?)
1935	Portuguesa (SP)	?	(?)
1936	Olímpico - RJ	?	(?)

International career
1930	Brazil	2	(0)
- * Club domestic league appearances and goals

Humberto de Araújo Benvenuto (4 December 1904 – 24 June 1949) was a Brazilian football player. He played for the Brazil national team. In archival documents about his birth, the surname of his father and mother is spelled Benvenuto. But in life, Umberto had the nickname "Benê", so often his last name was written as both Benvenuto and Benevenuto. Humberto de Araujo Benvenuto was part of the Brazilian delegation to the first World Cup tournament in Uruguay in 1930, but he was not included in the squad of 22 players, like Alfredo de Almeida Rego or Doca.

Benevenuto started his career in the team Americano de Campos de Goytacazes, from his hometown of Rio, then moved for two seasons to another small team, Jequié de Bahia. Then the talented midfielder was noticed by the first "big" club in his life - Flamengo, where he stayed on 5 years. With Flamengo, he won two Carioca championships and was even called up to National team. In total, he played 119 matches for Flamengo (56 wins, 17 draws and 46 losses) and scored 13 goals.

Before the 1930 World Cup, he left to play for the Atletico Mineiro club from the state of Minas Gerais. At the World Cup, Benevenuto did not play a single match. After Atlético, he returned to Flamengo, from where he moved to Botafogo, in which he won his third Carioca title.

He had a short period in Peñarol in Uruguay, then he returned to Brazil, where he played for many clubs, never staying anywhere for more than 2 years. At the end of his career he played for Olympico from Rio, before he ended his career at Atlético Mineiro, the last match for which he played on 11 October 1936 against Retiru (4-0); he scored two goals.

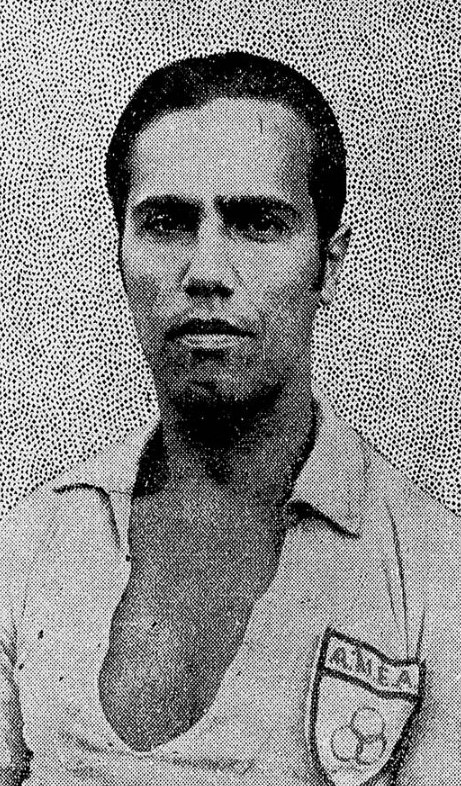
Humberto de Araújo Benvenuto

After the 1930 World Cup, Benvenuto played in two friendly matches for the Brazil national team: on 10 August against Yugoslavia (he came on as a substitute), and on 17 August against the U.S. team. These are his only matches for the national team.

Humberto de Araujo Benvenuto died suddenly on 24 June 1949 at the age of 44. In memory of the footballer, at the initiative of the referee Alberto da Gama Malscher, the Botafogo and Gremio clubs agreed to hold a match in favor of the family, which remained in a difficult financial situation.

== Honours ==
=== Club ===
- Campeonato Carioca (3):

Flamengo: 1925, 1927, 1932
