= Alfredo Sánchez (footballer, born 1904) =

Mexican footballer

Personal information
- Full name: Alfredo Viejo Sánchez
- Date of birth: 28 May 1904
- Place of birth: Orizaba, Mexico
- Date of death: 15 April 1991
- Position: Midfielder

Senior career*
Years	Team	Apps	(Gls)
1928–1943	América		

International career
1930–1938	Mexico	12	(0)
Medal record
Representing Mexico
Men's Football
Central American and Caribbean Games
Gold medal – first place	1938 Panama	Team competition
- * Club domestic league appearances and goals

Alfredo Viejo Sánchez (28 May 1904 – 15 April 1991) was a Mexican football forward who made three appearances for Mexico at the 1930 FIFA World Cup. He also made three appearances at the 1938 Central American and Caribbean Games.

== Honours ==
International

- Central American and Caribbean Games Gold Medal: 1938
