= Eberardo Villalobos =

Chilean footballer (1908-1964)

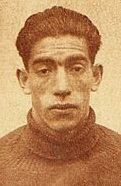
- in Los Sports, 1930

Personal information
- Full name: Eberardo Villalobos Schad
- Date of birth: 1 April 1908
- Place of birth: Chile
- Date of death: 26 June 1964 (aged 56)
- Position: Forward

Senior career*
| Years | Team | Apps | (Gls) |
| 1930 | Rangers | | |

International career
| 1930 | Chile | 3 | (0) |
- * Club domestic league appearances and goals

Eberardo Villalobos Schad (1 April 1908 – 26 June 1964) was a Chilean football attacker who represented the Chile national team in three matches at the 1930 FIFA World Cup. He was played in the Chilean league in Rangers.
