= Juan Aguilera (Chilean footballer) =

Chilean footballer (1903–1979)

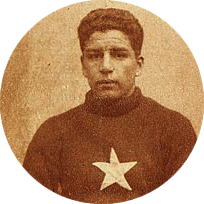
- Aguilera in 1930

Personal information
- Full name: Juan Aguilera Araneda
- Date of birth: 23 October 1903
- Place of birth: Santiago, Chile
- Date of death: 21 October 1979 (aged 75)
- Height: 1.64 m (5 ft 4 1/2 in)
- Position: Forward

Senior career*
Years	Team	Apps	(Gls)
1930	Audax Italiano		

International career
1930	Chile	1	(0)
- * Club domestic league appearances and goals

Juan Aguilera Araneda (23 October 1903 – 21 October 1979) was a Chilean football attacker. He played in the 1930 World Cup and in the Chilean league in Audax Italiano.
