= Isidoro Sota =

Mexican footballer (1902-1976)

Personal information
- Full name: Isidoro Sota García
- Date of birth: 4 February 1902
- Place of birth: Mexico
- Date of death: 8 December 1976 (aged 74)
- Position: Goalkeeper

International career
Years	Team	Apps	(Gls)
1930	Mexico	1	

Isidoro Sota García (4 February 1902 – 8 December 1976) was a Mexican footballer (goalkeeper) who participated in the 1930 FIFA World Cup. He played in only one game (versus Chile) and was beaten three times. Sota's club during the tournament was Club América.
