= André Maschinot =

French footballer (1903–1963)

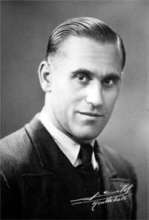

Personal information
- Date of birth: 28 June 1903
- Place of birth: Valdoie, France
- Date of death: 10 March 1963 (aged 59)
- Place of death: Colmar, France
- Position: Forward

Senior career*
| Years | Team | Apps | (Gls) |
| 1922-1927 | US Belfort | | |
| 1927-1929 | AS Strasbourg | | |
| 1929-1937 | Sochaux | | |

International career
| 1927–1930 | France | 5 | (2) |
- * Club domestic league appearances and goals

André Maschinot (French: [ɑ̃dʁe maʃino]; 28 June 1903 – 10 March 1963) was a French footballer. A forward, he played for Sochaux, and played for the France national team in the 1930 FIFA World Cup. He scored two goals in the first ever World Cup match, against Mexico, becoming the first player to score a brace in the FIFA World Cup.

== Club career ==
Maschinot started his career at US Belfort in 1922. In 1927, he joined AS Strasbourg where he spent two years, until 1929. He then stayed 8 years, from 1929 to 1937, at Sochaux, where he ended his career.

== International career ==
Maschinot got his first cap with the France national team on 24 April 1927 against Italy.

He was in the France squad for the 1930 FIFA World Cup. He played the first game against Mexico and scored 2 goals, thus becoming the first player in the history of the FIFA World Cup to score a brace. Those were his only two goals for France.

The second game against Argentina was his fifth and last cap.

== Career statistics ==
France's goal tally first

| # | Date | Venue | Opponent | Score | Result | Competition |
|---|---|---|---|---|---|---|
| 1. | 13 July 1930 | Estadio Pocitos, Montevideo, Uruguay | Mexico | 3–0 | 4–1 | 1930 FIFA World Cup |
| 2. | 13 July 1930 | Estadio Pocitos, Montevideo, Uruguay | Mexico | 4–1 | 4–1 | 1930 FIFA World Cup |

== Honours ==
Sochaux

- French Division 1 in 1934–35
