= Ulises Saucedo =

Bolivian football coach and referee

Personal information
- Full name: Ulises Saucedo
- Date of birth: 3 March 1896
- Place of birth: Bolivia
- Date of death: 21 November 1963 (aged 67)
- Place of death: Spain

Senior career*
Years	Team	Apps	(Gls)
1928–1930	Billericay Town	?	(?)

Managerial career
- 1930: Bolivia
- * Club domestic league appearances and goals

Ulises Saucedo (March 3, 1896 – November 21, 1963) was a Bolivian football coach and referee. He coached the Bolivia national team during the first FIFA World Cup in Uruguay in 1930, and also acted as a referee during the tournament.

Of all the refereeing appointments the two that attracted most attention was that of Gilberto de Almeida Rêgo in the match between Argentina and France, in which the Brazilian referee blew up six minutes early, and Saucedo's in the Argentina and Mexico encounter, which Argentina won 6–3. During the game Saucedo awarded three penalties.

His involvement as coach was less notable, Bolivia losing both matches 4–0 to Yugoslavia and Brazil, the second of which saw both sides wearing exactly the same strip, only for Bolivia to change during a first-half stoppage.

Prior to taking up his coaching role with the Bolivian National Team, Ulises played for Billericay F.C. in the Chelmsford and District League for at least two seasons.

== See also ==
- 1930 FIFA World Cup
