= Juan Carreño =

Mexican footballer (1907–1940)

Personal information
- Full name: Juan Carreño Lara
- Date of birth: 14 August 1907
- Place of birth: Mexico
- Date of death: 16 December 1940 (aged 33)
- Position: Forward

International career
Years	Team	Apps	(Gls)
1928–1930	Mexico	5	(2)

Juan Carreño Lara (14 August 1907 – 16 December 1940) was a Mexican footballer, and a participant of the 1930 FIFA World Cup. His nickname was 'Trompo' or 'Trompito' ('spinning top' in English). He was the first Mexican to score in the FIFA World Cup. During this tournament he was connected with Atlante F.C. He also scored Mexico's first goal in Olympic Games in Amsterdam 1928. He died of appendicitis aged 33.

== International goals ==
Mexico's goal tally first

#	Date	Venue	Opponent	Score	Result	Competition
1.	13 July 1930	Estadio Pocitos, Montevideo, Uruguay	France	1–3	1–4	1930 FIFA World Cup

== Sources ==
- A.Gowarzewski : "FUJI Football Encyclopedia. World Cup FIFA*part I*Biographical Notes - Heroes of Mundials"; GiA Katowice 1993
- Match report
