= Felipe Olivares =

Mexican footballer (born 1905)

Personal information
- Full name: Felipe Olivares Rojas
- Date of birth: 2/5/1905
- Place of birth: Mexico
- Position: Forward

International career
Years	Team	Apps	(Gls)
1930	Mexico	1	(0)

Felipe Olivares Rojas (February 5, 1905 - date of death unknown) was a Mexican football forward who made one appearance for the Mexico national team at the 1930 FIFA World Cup. He was also part of Mexico's squad for the football tournament at the 1928 Summer Olympics, but he did not play in any matches. Olivares is deceased.
