= Víctor Morales (Chilean footballer) =

Chilean footballer (1905-1938)

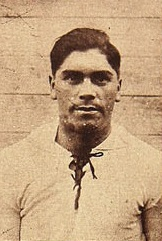

Personal information
- Full name: Víctor Morales Salas
- Date of birth: 10 May 1905
- Place of birth: Santiago, Chile
- Date of death: 22 May 1938 (aged 33)
- Position: Defender

International career
Years	Team	Apps	(Gls)
1924–1930	Chile	10	(0)

Víctor Morales Salas (10 May 1905 – 22 May 1938) was a Chilean football defender. He was part of Chile's team at the 1928 Summer Olympics.
