= Ernesto Chaparro =

Chilean footballer (1901–1957)

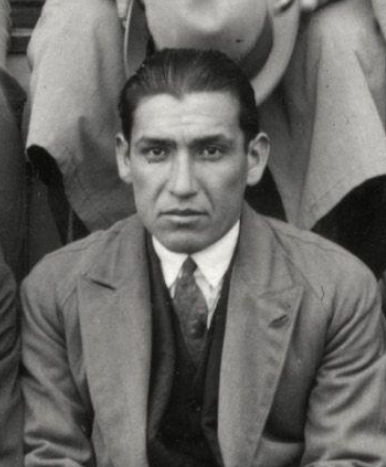

Personal information
- Full name: Ernesto Antonio Chaparro Esquivel
- Date of birth: 4 January 1901
- Place of birth: Pozo Almonte, Chile
- Date of death: 10 July 1957 (aged 56)
- Place of death: Santiago, Chile
- Position: Defender

Youth career
- Colo-Colo

Senior career*
Years	Team	Apps	(Gls)
1927–1934	Colo-Colo		

International career
1928–1930	Chile	5	(0)
- * Club domestic league appearances and goals

Ernesto Antonio Chaparro Esquivel (4 January 1901 – 10 July 1957) was a Chilean football defender. He was part of Chile's team at the 1928 Summer Olympics.
