= Thomas Balvay =

French football referee

Georges Balvay
Personal information
- Full name: Georges Balvay
- Date of birth: February 2, 1888
- Date of death: July 15, 1945 (aged 57)

Georges Balvay, also known as Thomas Balvay (2 February 1888 – 15 July 1945) was a football referee in the 1920s and 1930s and one of four European referees who participated in the first FIFA World Cup in 1930 in Uruguay. He was the only match official from France at the tournament.

== Career ==
He had been an international referee since 1922 and twice refereed the Coupe de France (in 1926 and 1928).

He travelled to Uruguay on the SS Conte Verde, which also took Jules Rimet and the French, Belgian, Romanian and Brazilian teams to the first World Cup; picking up the teams en route from Genoa to Rio de Janeiro before disembarking at Montevideo harbour.

== Confusion over nationality and name ==
Cris Freddi, a British football historian, says this: 'For decades, the referee's identity was in serious doubt. French papers of the time don't mention his forename, while one recent source calls him John Balway (with the suggestion that he might have been an Englishman living in Paris). Others say his forename was Thomas or spell his surname Balvey (we can ignore the Jornal do Brasil's Baldway!). It's Balway in many contemporary French, Dutch, and Spanish newspapers (he refereed a Spanish Cup Final), but some also spell it Balvay, as does the Official Report for the 1928 Olympics, which gives him the initial G. This was finally backed up in 2010, when an online edition of Le Parisien ran an interview with his granddaughter Amarande, a well-known actress and singer: "He took me to training sessions and instilled in me a passion for football." In the article, she calls him by name: "It's my grandfather Georges Balvay who refereed the first World Cup, Brazil-Bolivia in Uruguay in 1930."
