= Manuel Rosas (footballer, born 1912) =

Mexican footballer (1912–1989)

Personal information
- Full name: Manuel Rosas Sánchez
- Date of birth: 17 April 1912
- Place of birth: Mexico City, Mexico
- Date of death: 20 February 1989 (aged 76)
- Place of death: Mexico City, Mexico
- Position: Defender

Senior career*
Years	Team	Apps	(Gls)
1929–193?	Atlante F.C.	?	(?)

International career
1930	Mexico	2	(2)
- * Club domestic league appearances and goals

Manuel Rosas Sánchez (17 April 1912 – 20 February 1989), nicknamed Chaquetas, was a Mexican footballer who played as a defender. He participated in the inaugural 1930 FIFA World Cup representing the Mexico national football team.

== Early life and career ==
Manuel Rosas Sánchez was born in Mexico City on 17 April 1912 to Manuel Rosas Guzmán and Luz Sánchez. He was the eldest of ten children; two of his siblings, Felipe and Juan, also played professional football.

Rosas made his FIFA World Cup debut against France at the age of 18 years and 87 days, becoming the youngest player to represent Mexico at the tournament. The record stood for 96 years until it was broken by Gilberto Mora in 2026. He scored the first ever own goal in the competition, during a match against Chile. Three days later, he scored against Argentina from the penalty spot, the first penalty kick in World Cup history, and at 18 years and 93 days old became the youngest goalscorer in the tournament's history at the time, later superseded by Pelé, who scored at 17 years and 239 days. In the same match Rosas scored his only other goal for the national team, thereby becoming the first Mexican to score twice in the tournament.

His brother Felipe also played in the 1930 World Cup. Both were players of Atlante F.C. during the tournament.

== International goals ==
Mexico's goal tally first

#	Date	Venue	Opponent	Score	Result	Competition
1.	19 July 1930	Estadio Centenario, Montevideo, Uruguay	Argentina	1–3	3–6	1930 FIFA World Cup
2.	19 July 1930	Estadio Centenario, Montevideo, Uruguay	Argentina	2–5	3–6	1930 FIFA World Cup
