= Henri Christophe (referee) =

Belgian football referee

- Born: 23 July 1884
- Died: 17 June 1968 (aged 83)
- Occupation: Football Referee

Henri Christophe (23 July 1884 – 17 June 1968) was an international football referee from Belgium in the 1920s and 1930s.

Christophe had established his international reputation at the 1928 Summer Olympics in Amsterdam – but had been a referee from 1919 and, due to Belgian's participation in the 1930 FIFA World Cup – travelled to South America alongside Jean Langenus—on board the SS Conte Verde—as one of four Europeans who officiated during the competition.

Christophe had refereed two matches at the 1920 Summer Olympics in Antwerp, including the France v Italy match during the tournament. He took charge of the France v Latvia and the Sweden v Egypt quarter-final in the 1924 Summer Olympics in Paris. He also took charge of one game Italy v France in the 1928 Summer Olympics. In Uruguay he ran the line to compatriot Jean Langenus in the final.

Christophe was a fan of and, later, President of Cercle Sportif Vervietois.
