= Guillermo Subiabre =

Chilean footballer (1903–1964)

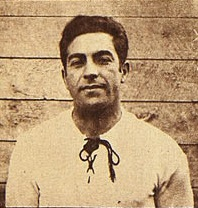

Personal information
- Full name: Guillermo Subiabre Astorga
- Date of birth: 25 February 1903
- Place of birth: Osorno, Chile
- Date of death: 11 April 1964 (aged 61)
- Place of death: Santiago, Chile
- Height: 1.71 m (5 ft 7 1/2 in)
- Position: Forward

Senior career*
Years	Team	Apps	(Gls)
1927-1934	Colo-Colo		
?	Santiago Wanderers		
- * Club domestic league appearances and goals

Guillermo Subiabre Astorga (25 February 1903 – 11 April 1964) was a Chilean footballer. During his career he played for Colo-Colo (1927–1934), Santiago Wanderers, and the Chile national football team. He also participated in the 1928 Summer Olympics and in the 1930 FIFA World Cup.

At Colo-Colo, Subiabre played as a striker for eight seasons, six of which were part of the amateur period and two of which were part of the professional period. In 1934, he was recognized as a lifetime honorary player for Colo-Colo.

== International goals ==
Chile's goal tally first

#	Date	Venue	Opponent	Score	Result	Competition
1.	12 October 1926	Estadio Sport de Ñuñoa, Santiago, Chile	Bolivia	2–0	7–1	1926 South American Championship
2.	17 October 1926	Estadio Sport de Ñuñoa, Santiago, Chile	Uruguay	1–3	1–3	1926 South American Championship
3.	5 June 1928	Monnikenhuize, Arnhem, Netherlands	Mexico	1–1	3–1	1928 Summer Olympics consolation round
4.	5 June 1928	Monnikenhuize, Arnhem, Netherlands	Mexico	2–1	3–1	1928 Summer Olympics consolation round
5.	5 June 1928	Monnikenhuize, Arnhem, Netherlands	Mexico	3–1	3–1	1928 Summer Olympics consolation round
6.	19 July 1930	Estadio Centenario, Montevideo, Uruguay	France	1–0	1–0	1930 FIFA World Cup
7.	22 July 1930	Estadio Centenario, Montevideo, Uruguay	Argentina	1–2	1–3	1930 FIFA World Cup
