= Roberto Gayón =

Mexican footballer (born 1905)

Personal information
- Full name: Roberto Gayón Márquez
- Date of birth: 1 January 1905
- Place of birth: San José, Costa Rica
- Position: Forward

International career
Years	Team	Apps	(Gls)
1930	Mexico	2	(1)

Roberto Gayón Márquez (born 1 January 1905 in San José, Costa Rica, date of death unknown) was a professional footballer who played as a forward who made two appearances for Mexico at the 1930 FIFA World Cup. Born in Costa Rica and son of Mexican diplomats, he played for the Mexico national team. Gayón is deceased.

== International goals ==
Mexico's goal tally first

#	Date	Venue	Opponent	Score	Result	Competition
1.	19 July 1930	Estadio Centenario, Montevideo, Uruguay	Argentina	3–5	3–6	1930 FIFA World Cup
