= Carlos Vidal =

Chilean footballer (1902-1982)

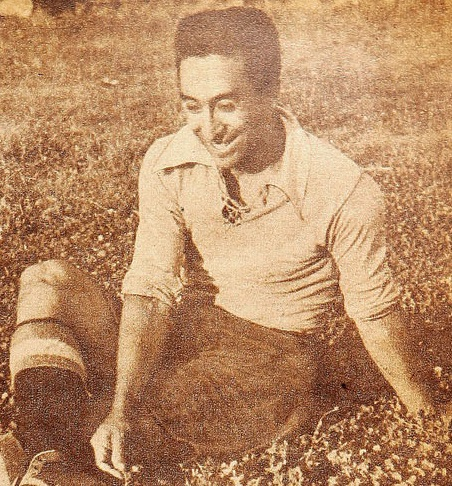

Personal information
- Full name: Carlos Vidal Lepe
- Date of birth: 24 February 1902
- Place of birth: Chile
- Date of death: 7 June 1982 (aged 80)
- Position: Forward

Senior career*
Years	Team	Apps	(Gls)
1930-?	Audax Italiano		

International career
1930	Chile	3	(2)
- * Club domestic league appearances and goals

Carlos Vidal Lepe (24 February 1902 – 7 June 1982) was a Chilean football forward who represented the Chile national team at the 1930 FIFA World Cup.

== International goals ==
Chile's goal tally first

#	Date	Venue	Opponent	Score	Result	Competition
1.	16 July 1930	Estadio Centenario, Montevideo, Uruguay	Mexico	1–0	1–0	1930 FIFA World Cup
2.	16 July 1930	Estadio Centenario, Montevideo, Uruguay	Mexico	1–0	3–0	1930 FIFA World Cup
