= Rafael Garza =

Mexican footballer and coach (1896-1974)

Personal information
- Full name: Rafael Garza Gutiérrez
- Date of birth: December 13, 1896
- Place of birth: Mexico City, Mexico
- Date of death: July 3, 1974 (aged 77)
- Place of death: Mexico City, Mexico
- Height: 1.75 m (5 ft 9 in)
- Position: Defender

Senior career*
Years	Team	Apps	(Gls)
1916–1932	América		

International career
1923–1930	Mexico	11	(0)

Managerial career
- 1917–1919: América (player-manager)
- 1920–1926: América (player-manager)
- 1929–1931: América (player-manager)
- 1933–1935: América
- 1934: Mexico
- 1935–1936: América
- 1937–1938: Mexico
- 1937–1942: América
- 1946–1949: América
- 1949: Mexico
- * Club domestic league appearances and goals

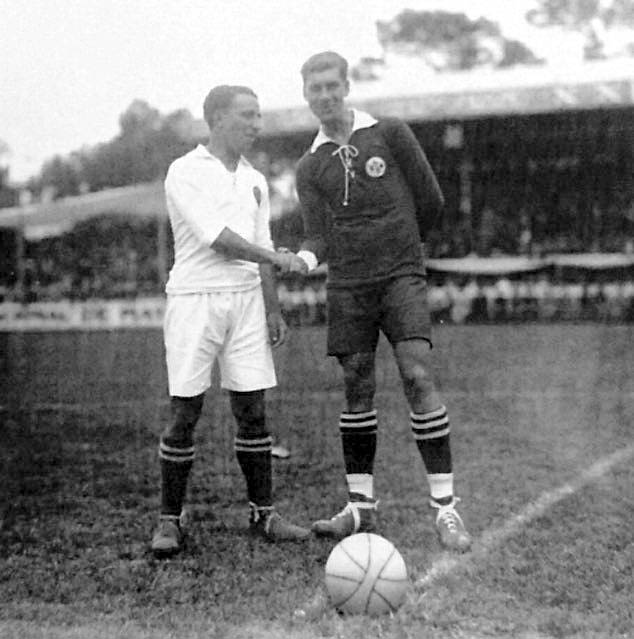
Rafael Garza in 1927 (on right)

Rafael Garza Gutiérrez (13 December 1896 – 3 July 1974), nicknamed "Récord", was a Mexican football coach and former professional defender. Garza was among the founders of Club América and captained Mexico at the 1930 FIFA World Cup in Uruguay. He and his younger brother Francisco were one of the first brother pairs to play together at a World Cup.

== Club career ==
A group of young men in Mexico City, including Garza, met on 12 October 1916 (Columbus Day) to establish Club América. Garza himself led América to four consecutive championships (player in 1924–25; player-manager in 1925–26, 1926–27, 1927–28).

== International career ==
Garza's early success brought him to the attention of those that championed the idea of a national team to represent Mexico in international competition. This team would be governed by Mexican Football Federation (Spanish: Federación Mexicana de Fútbol Asociación; FEMEXFUT), when it was created in 1927. Garza was elected to be the team's first head coach, although he had been informally coaching what was then the team since 1923. He continued at his post until 1928. He played at the 1928 Amsterdam Olympics and the 1930 World Cup. After his retirement, he continued to coach Mexico in three separate tenures (1934–35, 1937 and 1949).

== Honours ==
=== Player ===
==== América ====
Primera División: 1924–25, 1925–26, 1926–27, 1927–28

Copa Challenger: 1927

=== Manager ===
==== América ====
Primera División: 1926–27, 1927–28

=== International ===
NAFC Championship: 1949
