= Augustin Chantrel =

French footballer (1906-1956)

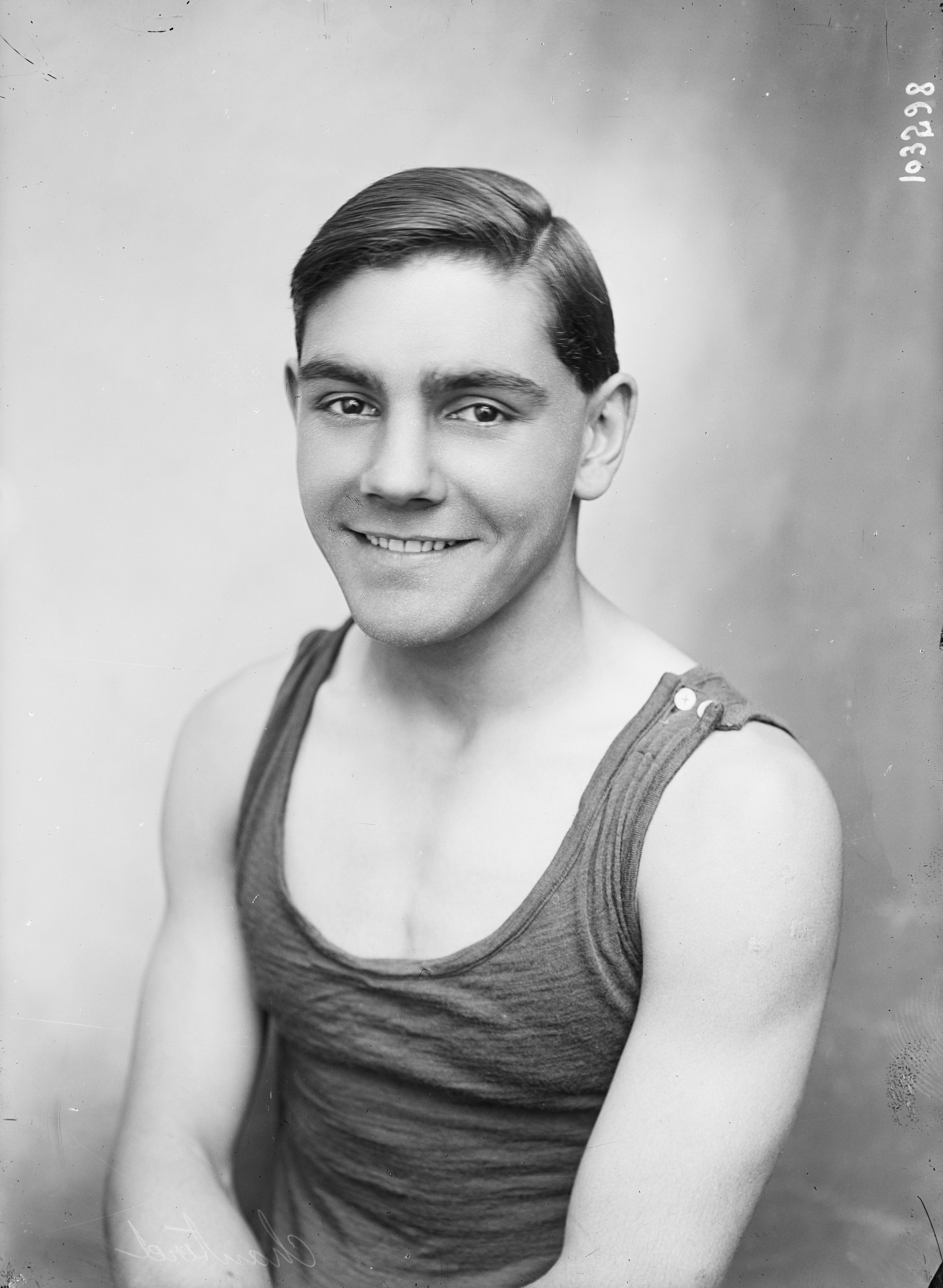

Personal information
- Full name: Augustin Chantrel
- Date of birth: 11 November 1906
- Place of birth: Mers-les-Bains, France
- Date of death: 4 September 1956 (aged 49)
- Height: 1.65 m (5 ft 5 in)
- Position: Right half

Youth career
- 1924-1925: Paris Université Club

Senior career*
Years	Team	Apps	(Gls)
1925–1929	Red Star		
1930–1933	CASG Paris		
1933–1934	Amiens		
1934–1939	Red Star		

International career
1928–33	France	15	(0)
- * Club domestic league appearances and goals

Augustin Chantrel (11 November 1906 - 4 September 1956) was a French footballer who played as a halfback. He represented France at the 1928 Olympic Football Tournament and at the 1930 FIFA World Cup.

== Club career ==
- 1924-1925 : Paris Université Club (youth club)
- 1925-1929 : Red Star
- 1930-1933 : CASG Paris
- 1933-1934 : Amiens SC
- 1934-1939 : Red Star

== International career ==
He was capped 15 times for the France between 1928 and 1933. His first cap was on 11 March 1928, against Switzerland.

He was part of the France squad for the 1928 Olympic Tournament playing in their only match, a 4–3 loss to Italy.

He was selected for the France squad for the 1930 FIFA World Cup. Chantrel appeared in all three of France's matches.

During the first half of the first match against Mexico, with the score 1–0 in favour of France, goalkeeper Alex Thépot suffered an injury after a collision with a Mexican player, and was unable to continue playing. Substitutions were not allowed at the time, and Chantrel, a halfback, replaced Thépot in goal from the 24th minute until the end of the match, which France won. Chantrel is the only player in World Cup history to see action as an outfield player and as a goalkeeper. He is also the only outfield player ever to replace a goalkeeper after having started the match at a different position.

Chantrel's last international match was against Germany on 19 March 1933.

== Honours ==
Red Star

- Coupe de France: 1928
