= Juan Luque de Serrallonga =

Spanish-Mexican footballer and coach (1882-1967)

Juan Luqué de Serrallonga
Personal information
- Full name: Juan Luqué de Serrallonga
- Date of birth: 21 August 1894
- Place of birth: Jerez de la Frontera, Andalusia, Spain
- Date of death: 18 July 1969 (aged 74)
- Place of death: Mexico City, Mexico
- Height: 1.69 m (5 ft 7 in)
- Position: Goalkeeper

Senior career*
Years	Team	Apps	(Gls)
- Cádiz CF
1915–1916	Sevilla FC		
- Cádiz CF

Managerial career
- 1930: Mexico
- CF Asturias
- Veracruz
- * Club domestic league appearances and goals

Juan José Luqué de Serrallonga (21 August 1894 – 18 July 1967) was a Spanish-Mexican football goalkeeper and Coach.

Born in Jerez de la Frontera, Andalucía, Spain, he spent his playing career mainly at Cádiz CF – then known as Español de Cádiz –, where he became known as "Juanito Luqué" due his relative lack of height – he stood 1.69 m (5 ft 7 in). He was also part of Sevilla FC in 1915 and 1916.

In July 1928, Luqué de Serrallonga emigrated from Spain to Mexico. He became head coach of the Selección de fútbol de México (Mexico national team) in January 1930, and managed the team in the 1930 FIFA World Cup. Later, he was the coach of Mexican club CD Veracruz, winning the national championship in the 1949-50 season with them. He died in 1969 in Mexico City.
