= Guillermo Riveros =

Chilean footballer (1902–1959)

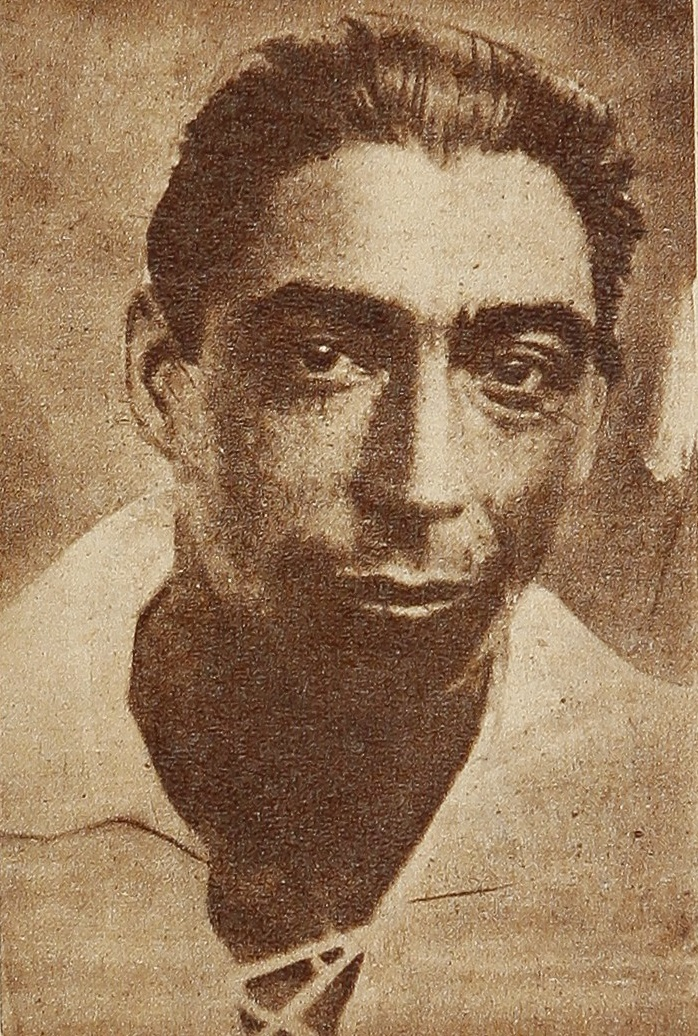
- A picture of Guillermo Riveros

Personal information
- Full name: Guillermo Arturo Riveros Conejeros
- Date of birth: 10 February 1906
- Place of birth: Talcahuano
- Date of death: 8 October 1959 (aged 57)
- Position: Defender

International career
Years	Team	Apps	(Gls)
1928–1930	Chile	3	(0)

Guillermo Arturo Riveros Conejeros (10 February 1906 – 8 October 1959) was a Chilean football defender. He was part of Chile's team at the 1928 Summer Olympics, but he did not play in any matches.
