= Óscar Bonfiglio =

Mexican footballer (1905–1987)

Personal information
- Full name: Óscar Bonfiglio Martínez
- Date of birth: October 5, 1905
- Place of birth: Estación Ortiz, Sonora, Mexico
- Date of death: November 4, 1987 (aged 82)
- Position: Goalkeeper

Senior career*
Years	Team	Apps	(Gls)
1925-1933	Marte	?	

International career
1930	Mexico	2	
- * Club domestic league appearances and goals

Óscar Bonfiglio Martínez (October 5, 1905 – November 4, 1987) was a Mexican football goalkeeper, and Olympian, who played for the Mexico national team in the 1930 World Cup.

== Career ==
Bonfiglio was the first goalkeeper beaten in World Cup history, with a goal by France forward Lucien Laurent. In two matches he conceded 10 goals: the most in the tournament. At the time, he played for the club Marte FC. Bonfiglio suffered an injury and retired from playing at age 28.

Bonfiglio played for Mexico at the 1928 Amsterdam Summer Olympics.

== Personal ==
Bonfiglio was the father of actor Oscar Morelli. Bonfiglio was credited to be the founder of Mexican football team Irapuato FC back in 1948. Bonfiglio was also of Italian descent.

== Sources ==
- A.Gowarzewski : "FUJI Football Encyclopedia. World Cup FIFA*part I*Biographical Notes – Heroes of Mundials" ; GiA Katowice 1993
- A.Gowarzewski : "FUJI Football Encyclopedia. World Cup FIFA*part II*History World Championship " ; GiA Katowice 1994
