= Gilberto de Almeida Rêgo =

Brazilian football referee (1895–1970)

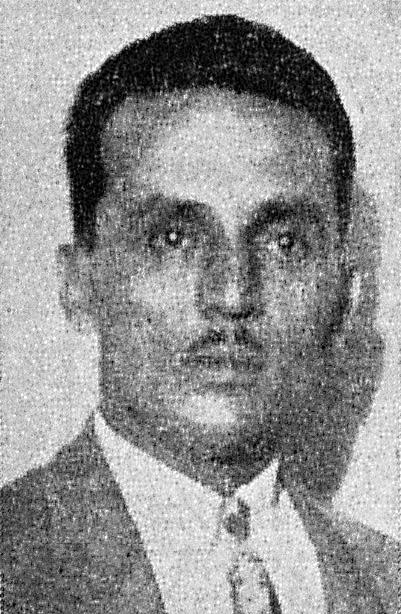
- Full name: Gilberto Arminio de Almeida Rêgo
- Born: 28 November 1895; Sant'Ana do Livramento, Rio Grande do Sul, Brazil
- Died: 4 March 1970 (aged 74); Rio de Janeiro, Brazil

Gilberto Arminio de Almeida Rêgo (November 28, 1895 – March 4, 1970) was a Brazilian football referee. He officiated several games at the 1930 FIFA World Cup.

== Biography ==
Gilberto de Almeida Rêgo became the first referee from Brazil to whistle in a World Cup match. He refereed in 3 matches at the Montevideo tournament in 1930:

Argentina 1-0 France, July 15;

Uruguay 4-0 Romania, July 21;

Uruguay 6-1 Yugoslavia, July 27, semi-final.

In two matches at the tournament, he was with the flag:

France 4-1 Mexico, July 13, opening match;

Chile 1-0 France, July 19.

Gilberto de Almeida Rêgo was a member of the Comissão Técnica of the Brazil national team at the 1930 World Cup.

In Montevideo, the Brazilian delegation included Gilberto's younger brother, football player Alfredo de Almeida Rêgo or Doca. But he was not included in the official squad's list of the 22-player for tournament.

Gilberto de Almeida Rêgo, his brother Alfredo de Almeida Rêgo (1905 - 1988), and their other brother Ary de Almeida Rêgo played on the São Cristóvão basketball team. And two years in a row the brothers became Carioca basketball champions, in 1929 and 1930.
