= Roberto Cortés (Chilean footballer) =

Chilean footballer (1905–1975)

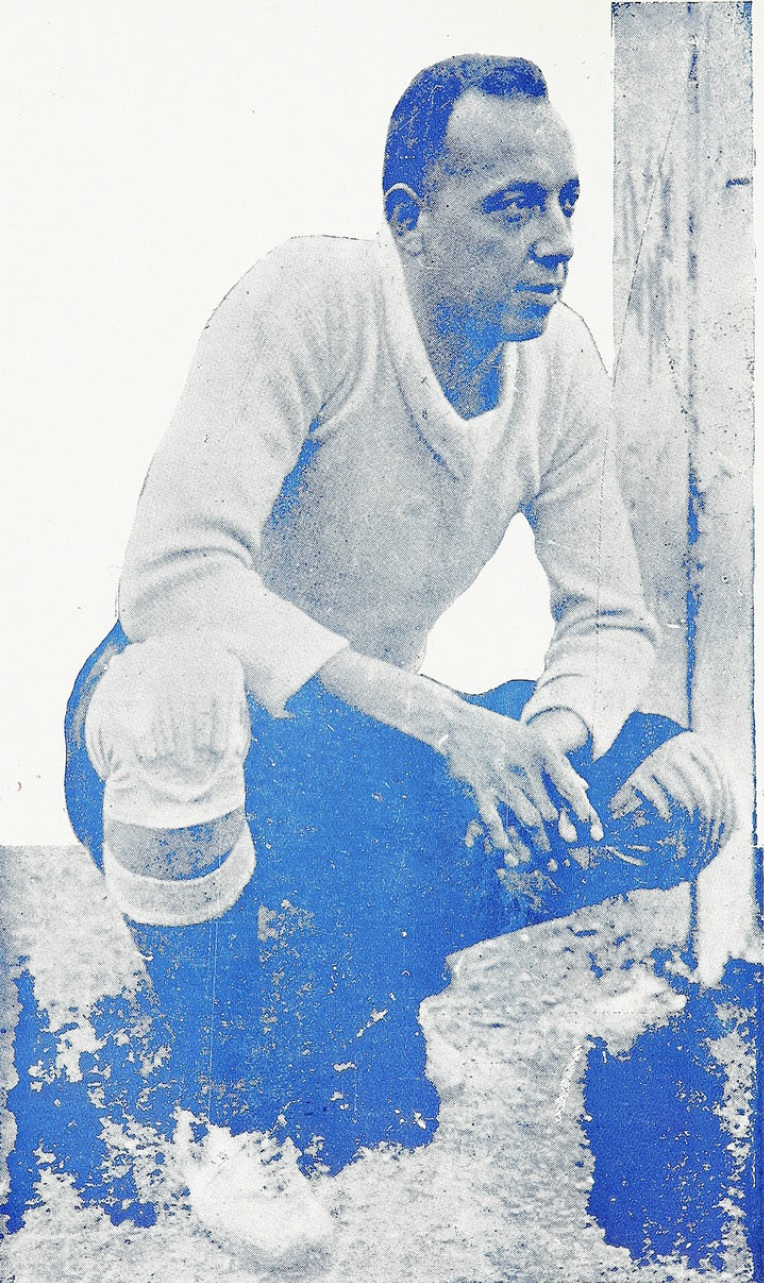

Personal information
- Full name: Roberto Cortés González
- Date of birth: 2 February 1905
- Place of birth: Chile
- Date of death: 30 August 1975 (aged 70)
- Height: 1.80 m (5 ft 11 in)
- Position: Goalkeeper

International career
Years	Team	Apps	(Gls)
1930	Chile	3 (-3)	

Roberto Cortés González (2 February 1905 – 30 August 1975) was a Chilean football goalkeeper. He was part of Chile's team at the 1928 Summer Olympics, but he did not play in any matches.
