= Arturo Torres (footballer, born 1906) =

Chilean footballer (1906–1987)

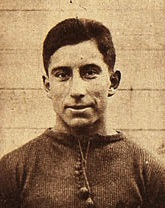

Personal information
- Full name: Arturo Torres Carrasco
- Date of birth: 20 October 1906
- Place of birth: Coronel, Chile
- Date of death: 20 April 1987 (aged 80)
- Place of death: San Miguel, Santiago, Chile
- Position: Midfielder

Senior career*
Years	Team	Apps	(Gls)
1926	Colo-Colo		
1928	Everton		
1929–1932	Colo-Colo		
1932	Deportivo Ñuñoa		
1932	Audax Italiano		
1932–1935	Magallanes		
1936–1937	Colo-Colo		

International career
1928–1935	Chile	8	(0)

Managerial career
- 1933-1935: Magallanes
- * Club domestic league appearances and goals

Arturo Torres Carrasco (20 October 1906 – 20 April 1987) was a Chilean football midfielder. He was part of Chile's team at the 1928 Summer Olympics.
