= Alex Thépot =

French footballer (1906-1989)

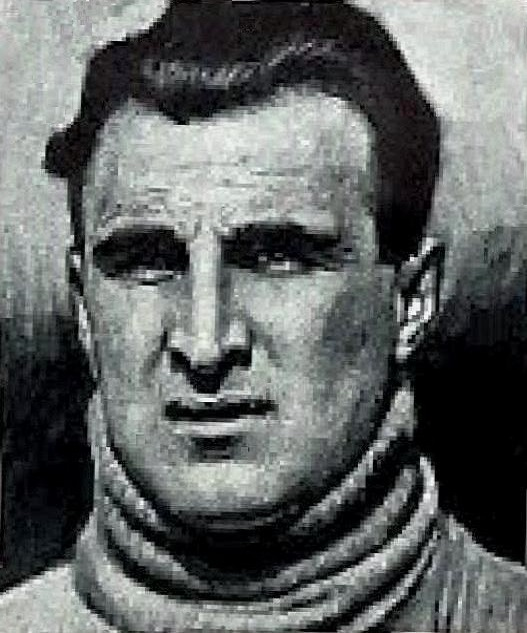
- Thépot in 1941

Personal information
- Full name: Alexis Thépot
- Date of birth: 30 July 1906
- Place of birth: Brest, France
- Date of death: 20 February 1989 (aged 82)
- Place of death: Dunkerque, France
- Height: 1.78 m (5 ft 10 in)
- Position: Goalkeeper

Youth career
- 1922–1927: Armoricaine Brest

Senior career*
Years	Team	Apps	(Gls)
1927–1928	FEC Levallois		
1928–1935	Red Star FC		
1935–1936	USL Dunkerque		

International career
1927–1935	France	31	(0)
- * Club domestic league appearances and goals

Alexis Thépot (French: [alɛks tepo]; 30 July 1906 – 20 February 1989) was a French footballer. He was the goalkeeper of the France national team in the first two World Cups, 1930 and 1934, and an Olympian.

== Club career ==
Thépot was born in Brest, Finistère. He played for Armoricaine de Brest (1922–1927), FEC Levallois (1927–28), Red Star FC (1928–1935), and USL Dunkerque (1935–1936). After a good year with Levallois, he was selected to play his first international match against England in 1927.

== International career ==
From 1927 to 1935, Thépot played in 31 international matches, conceding 77 goals, and was captain of the French team 13 times.

Thépot appeared in France's first ever World Cup match against Mexico in 1930, although he had to abandon the match during the first half due to an injury, being replaced in goal by half Augustin Chantrel. Thépot would come back and play in the next two matches, but his team was unable to go past the group stage, losing to Argentina 1–0 on a late goal, and 1–0 to Chile, despite having saved a penalty kick while the match was still 0–0.

He played France's only match at the 1928 Olympic Games, a 4–3 loss to Italy.
