= Estadio Pocitos =

Football stadium in Montevideo, Uruguay

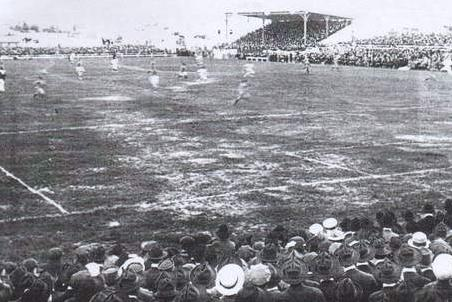
- The stadium during a match at the 1930 World Cup
- Interactive map of Estadio Pocitos
- Location: Montevideo, Uruguay
- Coordinates: 34°54′18″S 56°9′22″W
- Owner: Peñarol
- Capacity: 1,000
- Surface: Grass
- Field size: 109 x 75 m

Construction
- Opened: November 6, 1921
- Demolished: 1940; 86 years ago

Tenant
- Peñarol (1921–1933)

Estadio Pocitos was a multi-use stadium located in the Pocitos district of Montevideo, Uruguay. The stadium, owned by C.A. Peñarol, was mainly used for football matches from 1921 to 1933. It was demolished later in the 1930s when Peñarol started to play in the Estadio Centenario as its home field, and additionally due to the increasing urbanisation of Montevideo.

The stadium was one of the venues of the first FIFA World Cup held in 1930, and site of the first goal in World Cup history, scored by France's player Lucien Laurent against Mexico. The match was one of the two games that opened the World Cup, the other being held at the same time in Estadio Gran Parque Central.

This stadium was one of the first football stadiums to include elliptical stands, taken from the model of the ancient Greece theatre. It has been said that the Estadio Centenario was planned to be a "giant version" of this stadium. Pocitos Stadium was included in a German book of the 40 most influential stadiums in history.

== History ==
The stadium was officially inaugurate on November 6, 1921 with a friendly match between Peñarol and Argentine River Plate with ended 1–1. It was located on Coronel Alegre, Charrúa, Silvestre Blanco, and Avenida Soca streets. The original idea was to inaugurate the venue with a Peñarol v Nacional match but due to relations between the two biggest clubs of Uruguay were increasingly tense on those days and Nacional did not want to participate, a new match was arranged inviting River Plate.

Peñarol used the Pocitos stadium as their home venue until 1933 when the team moved to Estadio Centenario that had been built for the 1930 FIFA World Cup.

Due to major road development projects in the city, the streets were laid out on the playing field in 1937 and the ticket offices were demolished along with the Pocitos tram station of in 1946 when Doctor Francisco Soca Avenue was extended to José Batlle y Ordóñez Park. The field disappeared and became part of a middle-class neighborhood of Montevideo with high real estate value.

Between 2002 and 2006, the Uruguayan architect Héctor Benech took on the challenge of conducting an investigation to determine the exact place where the first World Cup goal was scored. Without official records, he found in the archives of the Municipality of Montevideo an aerial photograph from 1926 which, by superimposing it with a current photo, made it possible to locate the playing field. In June 2006, the discovery was made public at the Uruguayan Football Museum of the AUF.

The Uruguayan Football Museum, the Municipal Administration of Montevideo and "Montevideo Refrescos" (local bottler of Coca-Cola) jointly organized the contest "In Search of the Lost Arch", to make two sculptures, one in the original location of the center of the pitch and the other in the location of the goal where the first goal in World Cup history was scored. The contest was won by Argentine architect Eduardo Di Mauro with his works Cero a cero y pelota al medio ("zero to zero and ball to the middle") and Donde duermen las arañas ("where the spiders sleep").

== Events ==
=== 1930 FIFA World Cup ===
During the 1930 FIFA World Cup, the stadium hosted two group matches:

Zone	Team 1	Score	Team 2
Group 1	France	4–1	Mexico
Group 3	Romania	3–1	Peru

=== Other football matches ===
The stadium hosted some friendly matches during the British football clubs tours to South America in the 1920s. Matches held in Pocitos include:

Date	Event	Team 1	Score	Team 2
19 June 1923	Friendly	Uruguay	1–1	(Scotland) Third Lanark
4 Jul 1923	Friendly	(Uruguay) Peñarol	2–0	(Scotland) Third Lanark
31 Aug 1924	Copa Premio Honor	Uruguay	2–3	Argentina
14 Jun 1928	Friendly	(Uruguay) Peñarol	1–2	(Scotland) Motherwell
9 Jun 1929	Friendly	(Uruguay) Peñarol	2–1	(England) Chelsea

Preceded by -	FIFA World Cup; Opening Match Venue; 1930	Succeeded by All venues used for the 1934 FIFA World Cup, matches on the first day were all played at the same time
