= 1930 FIFA World Cup =

Association football tournament in Uruguay

1er Campeonato Mundial de Fútbol (Spanish)
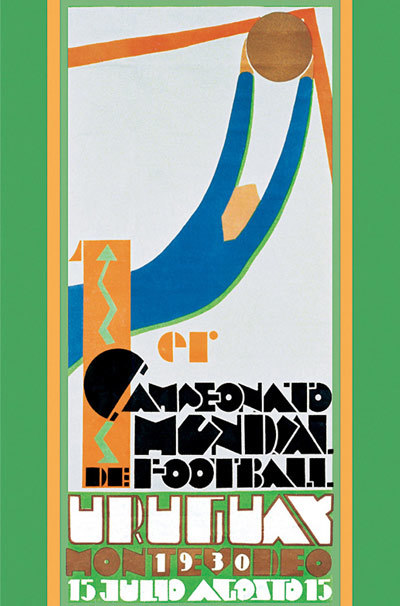
- Official poster, designed by Guillermo Laborde

Tournament details
- Host country: Uruguay
- City: Montevideo
- Dates: 13–30 July
- Teams: 13 (from 3 confederations)
- Venues: 3 (in 1 host city)

Final positions
- Champions: Uruguay (1st title)
- Runners-up: Argentina
- Third place: United States (Note: Though a match for third place was not played at the World Cup until 1934, accounts differ as to whether a match for third place was originally scheduled. Some sources state that Yugoslavia refused to play a match for third place because they were upset with the refereeing in their semi-final against Uruguay. A FIFA technical committee report on the 1986 World Cup included full retrospective rankings of all teams at all previous World Cup finals; this report ranked the United States third and Yugoslavia fourth, based on the U.S.'s better goal difference on otherwise identical records, a practice since continued by FIFA.)
- Fourth place: Yugoslavia

Tournament statistics
- Matches played: 18
- Goals scored: 70 (3.89 per match)
- Attendance: 590,549 (32,808 per match)
- Top scorer(s): (Argentina) Guillermo Stábile (8 goals)

The 1930 FIFA World Cup was the first FIFA World Cup, the world championship for men's national football teams. It took place in Uruguay from 13 to 30 July 1930. FIFA, football's international governing body, selected Uruguay as the host nation, as the country would be celebrating the centenary of its first constitution and the Uruguay national football team had retained their football title at the 1928 Summer Olympics. All matches were played in the Uruguayan capital, Montevideo, the majority at the purpose-built Estadio Centenario.

Thirteen teams (seven from South America, four from Europe, and two from North America) entered the tournament. Only a handful of European teams chose to participate because of the difficulty of traveling to South America during the Great Depression. The teams were divided into four groups, with the winner of each group progressing to the semi-finals. The first two World Cup matches took place simultaneously and were won by France and the United States, who defeated Mexico 4–1 and Belgium 3–0, respectively. Lucien Laurent of France scored the first goal in World Cup history, while United States goalkeeper Jimmy Douglas posted the first clean sheet in the tournament the same day.

Argentina, Uruguay, the United States, and Yugoslavia won their respective groups to qualify for the semi-finals. In the final, hosts and pre-tournament favourites Uruguay defeated Argentina 4–2 in front of 68,346 people to become the first nation to win the World Cup. Francisco Varallo from Argentina was the last surviving player from this World Cup. He died in 2010 at the age of 100. The 2030 FIFA World Cup opening match to be played at Estadio Centenario will honor the centennial anniversary of the World Cup.

The 1930 FIFA World Cup final was the first to be contested by two nations sharing the same primary language, as both sides were Spanish-speaking, and remained the only such final for 96 years, until the 2026 final between Argentina and Spain. As of 2026, it is also the only final contested between two South American nations (the 1950 match between Brazil and Uruguay was the deciding match of the final group stage, not an actual cup final).

== Participants ==
FIFA, the governing body of world football, had been discussing the creation of a competition for national teams for several years prior to 1930. The organisation had managed the football segment of the Summer Olympics on behalf of the International Olympic Committee since the early 20th century and the success of the competition at the 1924 and 1928 Olympic Games led to the formation of the FIFA World Cup. At the 17th FIFA congress, held in Amsterdam in May 1928, the competition was proposed by president Jules Rimet and accepted by the organisation's board, with vice-president Henri Delaunay proclaiming "international football can no longer be held within the confines of the Olympics".

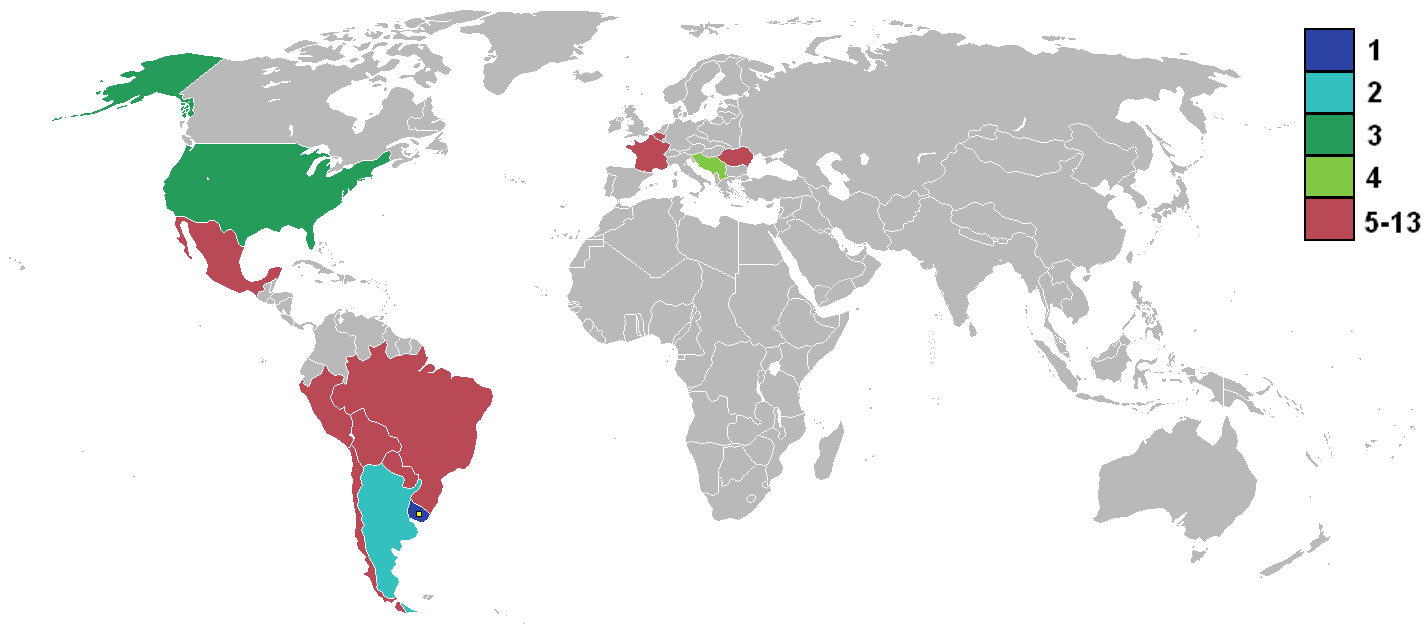
Participating countries, tinted by order of finish

The first World Cup was the only one without qualification. Every country affiliated with FIFA was invited to compete and given a deadline of 28 February 1930 to accept. The competition was originally planned as a 16-team knockout tournament with a potential second division if enough teams entered; however, the number of teams failed to reach 16, so there were no qualifications. Plenty of interest was shown by nations in the Americas; Argentina, Brazil, Bolivia, Chile, Mexico, Paraguay, Peru and the United States all entered. A total of seven South American teams participated, more than in any subsequent World Cup Finals. However, because of the long, costly trip by ship across the Atlantic Ocean and the length of absence required for players, very few European teams were inclined to take part as the effects of the Great Depression set in across the continent. and no European entries were received before the February deadline. In an attempt to gain some European participation, the Uruguayan Football Association sent a letter of invitation to The Football Association, even though the British Home Nations (England, Northern Ireland, Scotland and Wales) had resigned from FIFA at the time. This was rejected by the FA Committee on 18 November 1929. Out of the two Asian countries affiliated to FIFA at the time, Japan and Siam (modern-day Thailand), neither elected to enter the competition, while Egypt, the lone African team to enter, was delayed by a storm in the Mediterranean, and the ship intended to take them to Uruguay departed without them.

Two months before the start of the tournament, no team from Europe had officially entered. FIFA president Rimet and Uruguayan diplomat Enrique Buero intervened and four European teams eventually made the trip by sea: Belgium, France, Romania and Yugoslavia. The Romanians, managed by Constantin Rădulescu and coached by their captain Rudolf Wetzer and Octav Luchide, entered the competition following the intervention of the newly crowned King Carol II. He selected the squad personally and negotiated with employers to ensure that the players would still have jobs upon their return. The French entered at the personal intervention of Rimet, but neither France's star defender Manuel Anatol nor the team's regular coach Gaston Barreau could be persuaded to make the trip. The Belgians participated at the instigation of German-Belgian FIFA vice-president Rodolphe Seeldrayers.

We were 15 days on the ship Conte Verde getting out there. We embarked from Villefranche-sur-Mer in the company of the Belgians and the Yugoslavs. We did our basic exercises down below and our training on deck. The coach never spoke about tactics at all ...

— Lucien Laurent

The Romanians boarded the SS Conte Verde at Genoa, Italy; the French and Yugoslavs were picked up at Villefranche-sur-Mer, France, on 21 June 1930; and the Belgians embarked at Barcelona, Spain. The Conte Verde carried Rimet, the trophy and the three designated European referees: Belgians John Langenus and Henri Christophe, along with Thomas Balvay, a Parisian who may have been English. The Brazilian team were picked up when the boat docked in Rio de Janeiro on 29 June before arriving in Uruguay on 4 July. The official ball used for the tournament was the T-Model.

=== List of invited teams ===
The following 16 teams planned to compete at the final tournament. However, only 13 teams participated because Egypt, Japan, and Siam withdrew.

Asia (0)

- ~~Japan~~ (withdrew)
- ~~Siam~~ (withdrew)

Africa (0)

- ~~Egypt~~ (missed ship)

North America (2)

- Mexico
- United States

South America (7)

- Argentina
- Bolivia
- Brazil
- Chile
- Paraguay
- Peru
- Uruguay (hosts)

Europe (4)

- Belgium
- France
- Romania
- Yugoslavia

== Host selection ==
Italy, Sweden, the Netherlands, Spain, Hungary, and Uruguay all lodged applications to host the event. Later, Uruguay's bid became the clear selection after all the other countries withdrew their bids.

== Venues ==
The tournament was hosted across three venues, all within the national capital Montevideo. The Estadio Centenario was built both for the tournament and as a celebration of the centenary of Uruguayan independence. Designed by Juan Scasso, it was the primary stadium for the tournament, and referred to by Rimet as a "temple of football". With a capacity of 90,000 spectators, it was the largest football stadium outside of the British Isles at the time. The stadium hosted 10 of the 18 matches, including both semi-finals and the final. However, a rainy winter had meant its construction had run behind schedule, and was rushed to be ready in time for the tournament. This only delayed its inauguration further, eventually hosting its first game five days into the World Cup, with the hosts defeating Peru 1–0 thanks to a goal from Héctor "Manco" Castro. All matches prior to this had instead been played at two considerably smaller venues nearby, the Estadio Gran Parque Central of Nacional and the Estadio Pocitos of Peñarol.

Locations of the 1930 FIFA World Cup stadiums within the Montevideo metropolitan area

List of stadiums
Stadium	Capacity	Image
Estadio Centenario	90,000	
Estadio Gran Parque Central	20,000	
Estadio Pocitos	10,000	

== Match officials ==
Fifteen referees participated in the tournament: four Europeans – two Belgians (Henri Christophe and John Langenus), a Frenchman (Thomas Balvay) and a Romanian (Constantin Rădulescu, also the Romanian team coach), and eleven from the Americas – among them six Uruguayans. To eliminate differences in the application of the Laws of the Game, the referees were invited to one short meeting to iron out the most conflicting issues that could arise.

Of all the refereeing appointments, the two that attracted the most attention were that of Gilberto de Almeida Rêgo in the match between Argentina and France, in which the Brazilian referee blew for full-time six minutes early, and that of the Bolivian Ulises Saucedo's Argentina and Mexico encounter, which Argentina won 6–3. During the game, Saucedo, who was also the coach of Bolivia, awarded three penalties.

The following is the list of officials to serve as referees and linesmen. Officials in italics were only employed as linesmen during the tournament.

Europe

- (France) Thomas Balvay
- (Belgium) Henri Christophe
- (Belgium) John Langenus
- (Romania) Constantin Rădulescu

North America

- (Mexico) Gaspar Vallejo

South America

- (Uruguay) Gualberto Alonso
- (Uruguay) Martin Aphesteguy
- (Uruguay) Domingo Lombardi
- (Argentina) José Macías
- (Uruguay) Francisco Mateucci
- (Brazil) Almeida Rêgo
- (Bolivia) Ulises Saucedo
- (Uruguay) Anibal Tejada
- (Uruguay) Ricardó Vallarino
- (Chile) Álberto Warnken

== Format and draw ==
The thirteen teams were drawn into four groups, with Group 1 containing four teams and the others containing three. Each group played a round-robin format, with the four group winners progressing to the knockout semi-final stage. There was no match for third place.

Uruguay, Argentina, Brazil, and the United States were seeded and kept apart in the draw, which took place in Montevideo once all the teams arrived.

Since there were no qualifying games, the opening two matches of the tournament were the first World Cup games ever played, taking place simultaneously on 13 July 1930; France beat Mexico 4–1 at the Estadio Pocitos, while the United States defeated Belgium 3–0 at the same time at the Estadio Gran Parque Central. France's Lucien Laurent was the scorer of the first World Cup goal.

== Tournament summary ==
=== Group 1 ===
We were playing Mexico and it was snowing, since it was winter in the southern hemisphere. One of my teammates centred the ball and I followed its path carefully, taking it on the volley with my right foot. Everyone was pleased but we didn't all roll around on the ground – nobody realised that history was being made. A quick handshake and we got on with the game. And no bonus either; we were all amateurs in those days, right to the end.

— Lucien Laurent

The first group was the only one to contain four teams: Argentina, Chile, France, and Mexico. Two days after France's victory over Mexico, they faced group favourites Argentina. Injuries hindered France; goalkeeper Alex Thépot had to leave the field after 20 minutes and Laurent, after a fierce tackle by Luis Monti, spent most of the match limping. However, they held out for most of the match, only succumbing to an 81st-minute goal scored from a Monti free kick. The game featured an officiating controversy when referee Almeida Rêgo erroneously blew the final whistle six minutes early, with Frenchman Marcel Langiller clear on goal; play resumed only after protests from the French players. Although France had played twice in 48 hours, Chile had yet to play their first match. They faced Mexico the following day, gaining a comfortable 3–0 win.

France's final match, against Chile, featured the first penalty kick of the World Cup. The first goalkeeper to save a penalty was Thépot of France on 19 July 1930, saving from Chile's Carlos Vidal in the 30th minute of the match. In Argentina's second match, against Mexico, three penalty kicks were awarded. During the same match on 19 July 1930, Mexico's Óscar Bonfiglio saved another penalty in the 23rd minute of the match against Argentina's Fernando Paternoster. Guillermo Stábile scored a hat-trick in his international debut as Argentina won 6–3, despite the absence of their captain Manuel Ferreira, who had returned to Buenos Aires to take a law exam. Qualification was decided by the group's final match, contested by Argentina and Chile, who had beaten France and Mexico, respectively. The game was marred by a brawl sparked by a foul on Arturo Torres by Monti. Argentina won 3–1 against their neighbours and advanced to the semi-finals.

=== Group 2 ===
The second group contained Brazil, Bolivia, and Yugoslavia. Brazil, the group seeds, were expected to progress, but in the group's opening match, unexpectedly lost 2–1 to Yugoslavia. Going into the tournament Bolivia had never previously won an international match. For their opener they paid tribute to the hosts by wearing shirts each emblazoned with a single letter, spelling "Viva Uruguay" as the team lined up. Both of Bolivia's matches followed a similar pattern, a promising start gradually transformed into heavy defeat. Against Yugoslavia, they held out for an hour before conceding but were four goals down by the final whistle. Misfortune played its part; several Bolivian goals were disallowed. Against Brazil, when both teams had only pride to play for, the score was 1–0 to Brazil at half-time. Brazil added three more in the second half, two of them scored by the multi-sportsman Preguinho. Yugoslavia qualified for the semi-finals.

=== Group 3 ===
Hosts Uruguay were in a group with Peru and Romania. The opening match in this group saw the first player expulsion from the competition when Plácido Galindo of Peru was sent off against Romania. The Romanians made their man advantage pay; their 3–1 win included two late goals and the fastest goal of the tournament; Adalbert Deșu opened the scoring after just 50 seconds. This match had the smallest crowd of any in World Cup history. The official attendance was 2,459, but the actual figure is generally accepted to be around 300.

Construction delays at Estadio Centenario postponed Uruguay's first match to 18 July, the sixth match day of the tournament. The first to be held at the Centenario, it was preceded by a ceremony in honour of the Uruguayan centenary celebrations. The Uruguayan team spent the four weeks preceding the match in a training camp, at which strict discipline was exercised. Goalkeeper Andrés Mazali was dropped from the squad for breaking a curfew to visit his wife. One hundred years from the day of the creation of Uruguay's first constitution, the hosts won a tight match against Peru. The result was viewed as a poor performance by the Uruguayan press. Performance of the Peruvian goalkeeper Jorge Pardon drew particular praise from neutral observers. Uruguay subsequently defeated Romania with ease, scoring four first-half goals to win 4–0.

=== Group 4 ===
The fourth group comprised Belgium, Paraguay, and the United States. The American team, which contained a significant number of new caps, were reputedly nicknamed "the shot-putters" by an unnamed source in the French contingent. They beat their first opponent, Belgium, 3–0. Both sides struggled early on in heavy rain and snowfall before the U.S. took control. Belgian reports bemoaned the state of the pitch and refereeing decisions, claiming that the second goal was offside. The group's second match, played in windy conditions, witnessed the first tournament hat-trick, scored by Bert Patenaude of the United States against Paraguay. Until 10 November 2006, the first hat-trick that FIFA acknowledged had been scored by Stábile of Argentina, two days after Patenaude; however, in 2006 FIFA announced that Patenaude's claim to being the first hat-trick scorer was valid, as a goal previously assigned to teammate Tom Florie was reattributed to Patenaude. With the United States having secured qualification, the final match in the group was a dead rubber. Paraguay beat Belgium by a 1–0 margin.

=== Semi-finals ===
The four group winners, Argentina, Yugoslavia, Uruguay and the United States, moved to the semi-finals. The two semi-final matches saw identical scores. The first semi-final was played between the United States and Argentina on a rain-drenched pitch. The United States team, which featured six British-born players, lost midfielder Raphael Tracey after 10 minutes to a broken leg as the match became violent. A Monti goal halfway through the first half gave Argentina a 1–0 half-time lead. In the second half, the strength of the United States team was overwhelmed by the pace of the Argentinian attacks, the match finishing 6–1 to Argentina.

In the second semi-final, there were shades of the 1924 Summer Olympics match between Yugoslavia and Uruguay. Here, though, Yugoslavia took a surprise lead through Đorđe Vujadinović. Uruguay then took a 2–1 lead. Then shortly before half-time, Yugoslavia had a goal disallowed by a controversial offside decision. The hosts scored three more in the second half to win 6–1, Pedro Cea completing a hat-trick.

=== Third and fourth place ===
The now-traditional match for third place was not established until 1934, so the format of the 1930 World Cup is unique in not distinguishing between the third and fourth-placed teams. Occasional sources, notably a FIFA Bulletin from 1984, incorrectly imply that a match for third place occurred and was won 3–1 by Yugoslavia. Accounts differ as to whether a match for third place was originally scheduled. According to a 2009 book by Hyder Jawad, Yugoslavia refused to play a match for third place because they were upset with the refereeing in their semi-final against Uruguay.

At the end of the championship, the captains of the United States team (Tom Florie) and Yugoslavia (Milutin Ivković) both received bronze medals. Yet a FIFA technical committee report on the 1986 World Cup included full retrospective rankings of all teams at all previous World Cup finals; this report ranked the United States third and Yugoslavia fourth, based on goal difference, a practice since continued by FIFA. In 2010, the son of Kosta Hadži, the chief of the Yugoslav delegation at the 1930 World Cup and the vice-president of the Football Association of Yugoslavia at the time, claimed that Yugoslavia, as a team, has been awarded one bronze medal, which has been kept by Hadži himself and his family for the following 80 years. According to this source, Yugoslavia was placed third because of the semi-final loss to the eventual champions, Uruguay. The official recording however shows the United States team claiming third place.

=== Final ===
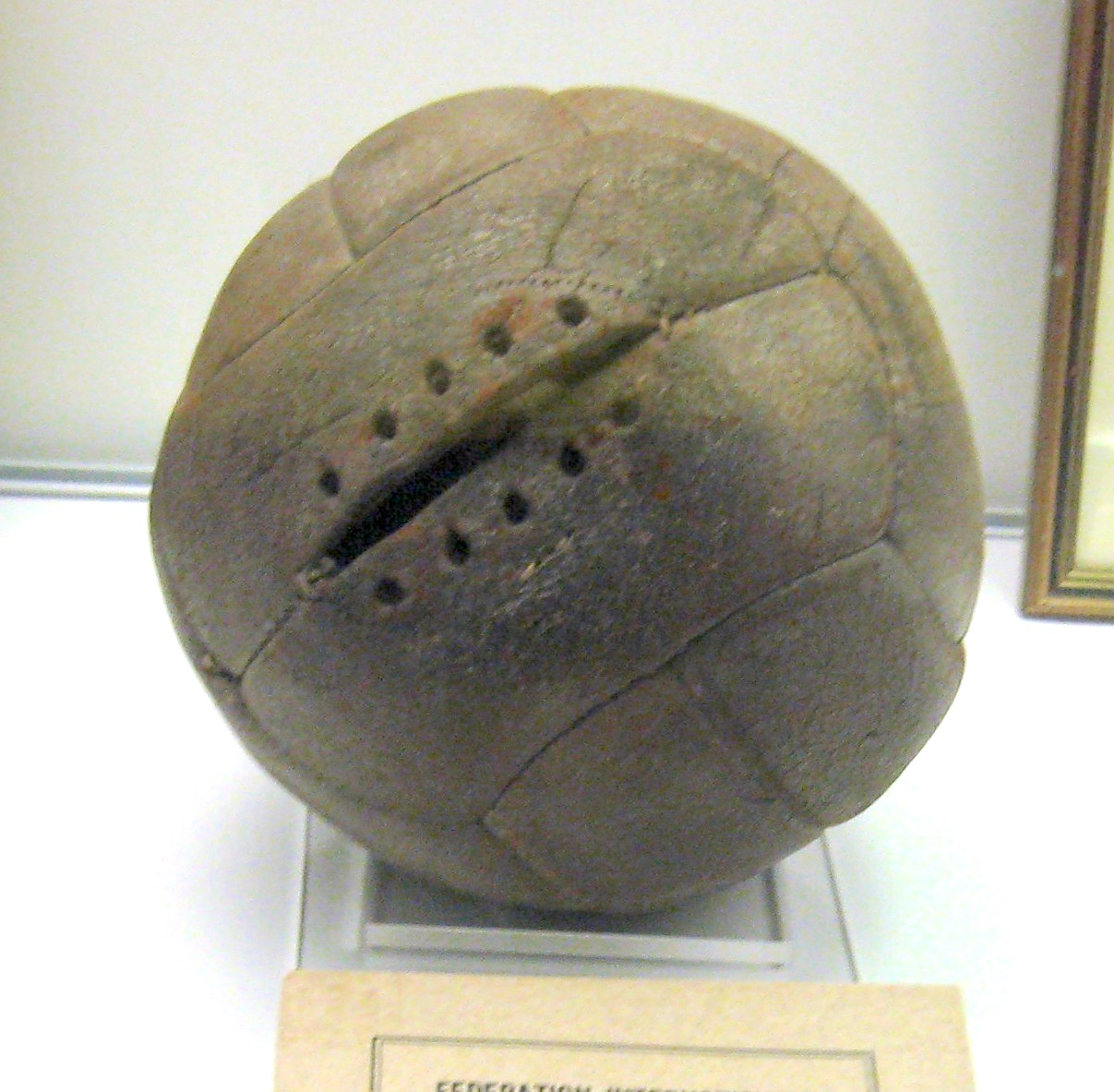
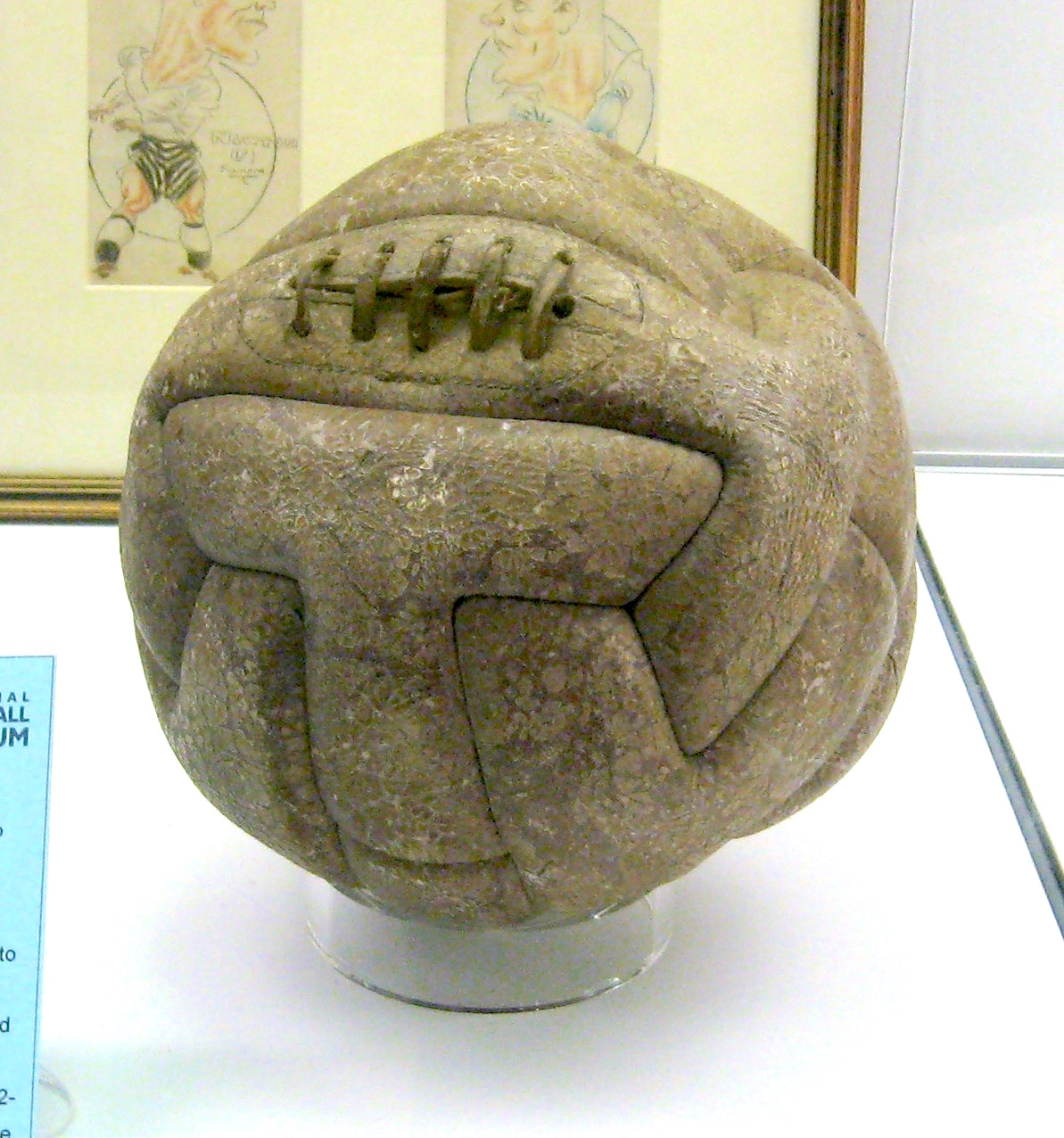
Because of a dispute, a different ball was used in each half, one chosen by each team. Argentina's ball (top) was used for the first half and Uruguay's ball (bottom) was used for the second half.

The resounding wins for Uruguay and Argentina in the semi-finals meant the final was a repeat of the matchup in the 1928 Olympic final, which Uruguay had won 2–1 after a replay.

The final was played at the Estadio Centenario on 30 July. Feelings ran high around the La Plata Basin as the Argentine supporters crossed the river with the war cry Victoria o muerte ("victory or death"), dispelling any uncertainty as to whether the tournament had captured the imagination of the public. The ten boats earmarked to carry Argentine fans from Buenos Aires to Montevideo proved inadequate, and any number of assorted craft attempted the crossing. An estimated 10–15,000 Argentinians made the trip, but the port at Montevideo was so overwhelmed that many did not even make landfall before kick-off, let alone reach the stadium. At the stadium, supporters were searched for weapons. The gates were opened at eight o'clock, six hours before kick-off, and by noon the ground was full, with an official attendance of 93,000. A disagreement overshadowed the build-up to the match as the teams failed to agree on who should provide the match ball, forcing FIFA to intervene and decree that the Argentine team would provide the ball for the first half and the Uruguayans would provide their own for the second. Uruguay made one change from their semi-final line-up. Castro replaced Anselmo, who was ill. Monti played for Argentina despite receiving death threats on the eve of the match. The referee was Belgian John Langenus.

The hosts scored the opening goal through Pablo Dorado, a low shot from a position on the right. Argentina, displaying superior passing ability, responded strongly. Within eight minutes they were back on level terms; Carlos Peucelle received a Ferreira through-ball, beat his marker and equalised. Shortly before half-time leading tournament goalscorer Guillermo Stábile gave Argentina a 2–1 lead. Uruguay captain Nasazzi protested, maintaining that Stábile was offside but to no avail. In the second half Uruguay gradually became ascendant. Shortly after Stábile missed a chance to score again, Uruguay attacked in numbers and Pedro Cea scored an equaliser. Ten minutes later, a goal by Santos Iriarte gave Uruguay the lead, and just before full-time Castro made it 4–2 to seal the win. Langenus ended the match a minute later and Uruguay added the title of World Cup winner to their mantle of Olympic champions. Jules Rimet presented the World Cup Trophy, which was later named for him, to the head of the Uruguayan Football Association, Raúl Jude. The following day was declared a national holiday in Uruguay; in the Argentinian capital, Buenos Aires, a mob threw stones at the Uruguayan consulate. Francisco Varallo (who played as a forward for Argentina) was the last player in the final to die, on 30 August 2010.

France, Yugoslavia and the United States all played friendlies in South America following the competition. Brazil played France on 1 August, Yugoslavia on 10 August and the United States on 17 August, while Argentina hosted Yugoslavia on 3 August.

Uruguay's aggregate goal difference of +12 over four games, at an average of +3 per match, remains the highest average goal difference per match of any World Cup champion and the second-highest of any World Cup finals participant, after Hungary in 1954.

== Group stage ==
=== Group 1 ===
Pos	Team	Pld	W	D	L	GF	GA	GD	Pts	Qualification
1	Argentina	3	3	0	0	10	4	+6	6	Advance to the knockout stage
2	Chile	3	2	0	1	5	3	+2	4	
3	France	3	1	0	2	4	3	+1	2	
4	Mexico	3	0	0	3	4	13	−9	0	

Source: ESPN
13 July 1930
15:00 UYT (UTC−03:30)

France	4–1	Mexico
L. Laurent 19'; Langiller 40'; Maschinot 43', 87'		Carreño 70'

Estadio Pocitos, Montevideo
Attendance: 4,444
Referee: Domingo Lombardi (Uruguay)

15 July 1930
16:00 UYT (UTC−03:30)

Argentina	1–0	France
Monti 81'

Estadio Parque Central, Montevideo
Attendance: 23,409
Referee: Almeida Rêgo (Brazil)

16 July 1930
14:45 UYT (UTC−03:30)

Chile	3–0	Mexico
Vidal 3', 65' (Note: This is one of several goals for which the statistical details are disputed. The goalscorers and timings used here are those of FIFA, the official record. Some other sources, such as RSSSF, state a different scorer, timing, or both.); M. Rosas 52' (o.g.)

Estadio Parque Central, Montevideo
Attendance: 9,249
Referee: Henri Christophe (Belgium)

19 July 1930
12:50 UYT (UTC−03:30)

Chile	1–0	France
Subiabre 67'

Estadio Centenario, Montevideo
Attendance: 2,000
Referee: Anibal Tejada (Uruguay)

19 July 1930
15:00 UYT (UTC−03:30)

Argentina	6–3	Mexico
Stábile 8', 17', 80'; Zumelzú 12', 55'; Varallo 53'		M. Rosas 42' (pen.), 65'; Gayón 75'

Estadio Centenario, Montevideo
Attendance: 42,100
Referee: Ulises Saucedo (Bolivia)

22 July 1930
14:45 UYT (UTC−03:30)

Argentina	3–1	Chile
Stábile 12', 13'; M. Evaristo 51'		Subiabre 15'

Estadio Centenario, Montevideo
Attendance: 41,459
Referee: John Langenus (Belgium)

=== Group 2 ===
Pos	Team	Pld	W	D	L	GF	GA	GD	Pts	Qualification
1	Yugoslavia	2	2	0	0	6	1	+5	4	Advance to the knockout stage
2	Brazil	2	1	0	1	5	2	+3	2	
3	Bolivia	2	0	0	2	0	8	−8	0	

Source: ESPN
14 July 1930
12:45 UYT (UTC−03:30)

Yugoslavia	2–1	Brazil
Tirnanić 21'; Bek 30'		Preguinho 62'

Estadio Parque Central, Montevideo
Attendance: 24,059
Referee: Aníbal Tejada (Uruguay)

17 July 1930
12:45 UYT (UTC−03:30)

Yugoslavia	4–0	Bolivia
Bek 60', 67'; Marjanović 65'; Vujadinović 85'

Estadio Parque Central, Montevideo
Attendance: 18,306
Referee: Francisco Mateucci (Uruguay)

20 July 1930
13:00 UYT (UTC−03:30)

Brazil	4–0	Bolivia
Moderato 37', 73'; Preguinho 57', 83'

Estadio Centenario, Montevideo
Attendance: 25,466
Referee: Thomas Balvay (France)

=== Group 3 ===
Pos	Team	Pld	W	D	L	GF	GA	GD	Pts	Qualification
1	Uruguay (H)	2	2	0	0	5	0	+5	4	Advance to the knockout stage
2	Romania	2	1	0	1	3	5	−2	2	
3	Peru	2	0	0	2	1	4	−3	0	

Source: ESPN
(H) Hosts
14 July 1930
14:50 UYT (UTC−03:30)

Romania	3–1	Peru
Deșu 1'; Stanciu 79'; Kovács 89'		De Souza 75'

Estadio Pocitos, Montevideo
Attendance: 2,549
Referee: Alberto Warnken (Chile)

18 July 1930
14:30 UYT (UTC−03:30)

Uruguay	1–0	Peru
Castro 65'

Estadio Centenario, Montevideo
Attendance: 57,735
Referee: John Langenus (Belgium)

21 July 1930
14:50 UYT (UTC−03:30)

Uruguay	4–0	Romania
Dorado 7'; Scarone 26'; Anselmo 31'; Cea 35'

Estadio Centenario, Montevideo
Attendance: 70,022
Referee: Almeida Rêgo (Brazil)

=== Group 4 ===
Pos	Team	Pld	W	D	L	GF	GA	GD	Pts	Qualification
1	United States	2	2	0	0	6	0	+6	4	Advance to the knockout stage
2	Paraguay	2	1	0	1	1	3	−2	2	
3	Belgium	2	0	0	2	0	4	−4	0	

Source: ESPN
13 July 1930
15:00 UYT (UTC−03:30)

United States	3–0	Belgium
McGhee 23'; Florie 45'; Patenaude 69'

Estadio Parque Central, Montevideo
Attendance: 18,346
Referee: José Macías (Argentina)

17 July 1930
14:45 UYT (UTC−03:30)

United States	3–0	Paraguay
Patenaude 10', 15', 50' (Note: FIFA initially credited the goal in the 15th minute to Tom Florie, but changed it to Patenaude in 2006. During previous years, it was also listed as an own goal by Aurelio González.)

Estadio Parque Central, Montevideo
Attendance: 18,306
Referee: José Macías (Argentina)

20 July 1930
15:00 UYT (UTC−03:30)

Paraguay	1–0	Belgium
Vargas Peña 40'

Estadio Centenario, Montevideo
Attendance: 12,000
Referee: Ricardo Vallarino (Uruguay)

== Knockout stage ==
=== Bracket ===
Semi-finals
27 July – Montevideo (Centenario)
Uruguay	6
Yugoslavia	1
26 July – Montevideo (Centenario)
Argentina	6
United States	1

Final
30 July – Montevideo (Centenario)
Uruguay	4
Argentina	2

=== Semi-finals ===
26 July 1930
14:45 UYT

Argentina	6–1	United States
Monti 20'; Scopelli 56'; Stábile 69', 87'; Peucelle 80', 85'		Brown 89'

Estadio Centenario, Montevideo
Attendance: 72,886
Referee: John Langenus (Belgium)

27 July 1930
14:45 UYT (UTC−03:30)

Uruguay	6–1	(Kingdom of Yugoslavia) Yugoslavia
Cea 18', 67', 72'; Anselmo 20', 31'; Iriarte 61'		Vujadinović 4'

Estadio Centenario, Montevideo
Attendance: 79,867
Referee: Gilberto de Almeida Rêgo (Brazil)

=== Final ===
30 July 1930
12:45 UYT (UTC-03:30)

Uruguay	4–2	Argentina
Dorado 12'; Cea 57'; Iriarte 68'; Castro 89'		Peucelle 20'; Stábile 37'

Estadio Centenario, Montevideo
Attendance: 68,346
Referee: John Langenus (Belgium)

== Statistics ==
=== Goalscorers ===
There were 70 goals scored in 18 matches, for an average of 3.89 goals per match.

8 goals

- (Argentina) Guillermo Stábile

5 goals

- (Uruguay) Pedro Cea

4 goals

- (United States) Bert Patenaude

3 goals

- (Argentina) Carlos Peucelle
- (Brazil) Preguinho
- (Uruguay) Peregrino Anselmo
- (Kingdom of Yugoslavia) Ivan Bek

2 goals

- (Argentina) Luis Monti
- (Argentina) Adolfo Zumelzú
- (Brazil) Moderato
- (Chile) Guillermo Subiabre
- (Chile) Carlos Vidal
- (France) André Maschinot
- (Mexico) Manuel Rosas
- (Uruguay) Héctor Castro
- (Uruguay) Pablo Dorado
- (Uruguay) Santos Iriarte
- (Kingdom of Yugoslavia) Đorđe Vujadinović

1 goal

- (Argentina) Mario Evaristo
- (Argentina) Alejandro Scopelli
- (Argentina) Francisco Varallo
- (France) Marcel Langiller
- (France) Lucien Laurent
- (Mexico) Juan Carreño
- (Mexico) Roberto Gayón
- (Paraguay) Luis Vargas Peña
- (Peru) Luis de Souza
- (Kingdom of Romania) Adalbert Deșu
- (Kingdom of Romania) Nicolae Kovács
- (Kingdom of Romania) Constantin Stanciu
- (United States) Jim Brown
- (United States) Tom Florie
- (United States) Bart McGhee
- (Uruguay) Héctor Scarone
- (Kingdom of Yugoslavia) Blagoje Marjanović
- (Kingdom of Yugoslavia) Aleksandar Tirnanić

1 own goal

- (Mexico) Manuel Rosas (against Chile)

There are several goals for which the statistical details are disputed. The goalscorers and timings used here are those of FIFA, the official record. Some other sources, such as RSSSF, state a different scorer, timing, or both.

=== Team of the Tournament ===
FIFA selected the following players for the 1930 FIFA World Cup All-Star Team.

Goalkeeper	Defenders	Midfielders	Forwards
(Uruguay) Enrique Ballestrero	(Uruguay) José Nasazzi (Socialist Federal Republic of Yugoslavia) Milutin Ivković	(Uruguay) José Leandro Andrade (Uruguay) Álvaro Gestido (Argentina) Luis Monti	(Uruguay) Héctor Castro (Uruguay) Pedro Cea (Uruguay) Héctor Scarone (Argentina) Guillermo Stábile (United States) Bert Patenaude

=== Tournament ranking ===
In 1986, FIFA published a report that ranked all teams in each World Cup up to and including 1986, based on progress in the competition and overall results. The rankings for the 1930 tournament were as follows:

Per statistical convention in football, matches decided in extra time are counted as wins and losses.

Pos	Grp	Team	Pld	W	D	L	GF	GA	GD	Pts	Final result
1	3	Uruguay (H)	4	4	0	0	15	3	+12	8	Champions
2	1	Argentina	5	4	0	1	18	9	+9	8	Runners-up
3	4	United States	3	2	0	1	7	6	+1	4	Third place
4	2	Yugoslavia	3	2	0	1	7	7	0	4	Fourth place
5	1	Chile	3	2	0	1	5	3	+2	4	Eliminated in group stage
6	2	Brazil	2	1	0	1	5	2	+3	2	Eliminated in group stage
7	1	France	3	1	0	2	4	3	+1	2	Eliminated in group stage
8	3	Romania	2	1	0	1	3	5	−2	2	Eliminated in group stage
9	4	Paraguay	2	1	0	1	1	3	−2	2	Eliminated in group stage
10	3	Peru	2	0	0	2	1	4	−3	0	Eliminated in group stage
11	4	Belgium	2	0	0	2	0	4	−4	0	Eliminated in group stage
12	2	Bolivia	2	0	0	2	0	8	−8	0	Eliminated in group stage
13	1	Mexico	3	0	0	3	4	13	−9	0	Eliminated in group stage

Source: FIFA
(H) Hosts

== See also ==
- See You in Montevideo: 2014 Serbian film recreating the tournament from the point of view of the Yugoslav team

== Bibliography ==
- Crouch, Terry (2002). The World Cup: The Complete History. London: Aurum. ISBN 1-85410-843-3. OCLC 48930580.
- Freddi, Cris (2006). Complete Book of the World Cup 2006. London: HarperCollins. ISBN 0-00-722916-X.
- Glanville, Brian (2005). The Story of the World Cup. London: Faber and Faber. ISBN 0-571-22944-1.
- Goldblatt, David (2008). The Ball Is Round: A Global History of Soccer. Penguin. ISBN 978-1-59448-296-0.
- Seddon, Peter (2005). The World Cup's Strangest Moments. London: Robson. ISBN 1-86105-869-1.
- FIFA World Football Museum (2017). The Official History of the FIFA World Cup. London: Carlton Books. ISBN 978-1787390188.
