= 1929 South American Championship squads =

List of footballers

The following squads were named for the 1929 South American Championship that took place in Argentina.

== Argentina ==
Head coach: (Argentina) Francisco Olazar and (Argentina) Juan José Tramutola

No.	Pos.	Player	Date of birth (age)	Caps	Goals	Club
—	MF	Juan Pablo Bartolucci	9 July 1907 (aged 22)	6	0	(Argentine Football Association) Huracán
—	GK	Ángel Luis Bossio	5 May 1905 (aged 24)	11	0	(Argentine Football Association) Talleres (RE)
—	GK	Juan Carlos Botasso	23 October 1908 (aged 21)	1	0	(Argentine Football Association) Argentino de Quilmes
—	MF	Pedro José Chalú	19 June 1906 (aged 23)	0	0	(Argentine Football Association) Ferro Carril Oeste
—	FW	Roberto Eugenio Cherro	23 February 1907 (aged 22)	8	7	(Argentine Football Association) Boca Juniors
—	DF	Alberto Cuello	23 September 1908 (aged 21)	0	0	(Argentine Football Association) Tigre
—	DF	Alberto Chividini	13 January 1906 (aged 23)	0	0	(Argentine Football Association) Central Norte (Tucumán)
—	DF	Juan Evaristo	20 June 1902 (aged 27)	17	1	(Argentine Football Association) Sportivo Palermo
—	FW	Mario Evaristo	12 October 1908 (aged 21)	1	0	(Argentine Football Association) Boca Juniors
—	FW	Alberto Fassora	23 December 1908 (aged 20)	0	0	(Argentine Football Association) Atlético Tucumán
—	FW	Manuel Ferreira	29 July 1905 (aged 24)	13	8	(Argentine Football Association) Estudiantes (LP)
—	MF	Rodolfo Orlando Orlandini	1 January 1905 (aged 24)	5	0	(Argentine Football Association) Sportivo Buenos Aires
—	DF	Fernando Paternoster	24 March 1905 (aged 24)	9	0	(Argentine Football Association) Racing Club
—	DF	Natalio Perinetti	28 December 1900 (aged 28)	6	0	(Argentine Football Association) Racing Club
—	MF	Carlos Desiderio Peucelle	13 September 1908 (aged 21)	2	1	(Argentine Football Association) Sportivo Buenos Aires
—	DF	Edmundo Piaggio	3 October 1910 (aged 19)	0	0	(Argentine Football Association) Lanús
—	FW	Juan Antonio Rivarola	13 June 1908 (aged 21)	0	0	(Argentine Football Association) Colón
—	FW	Manuel Seoane	19 March 1902 (aged 27)	18	12	(Argentine Football Association) Independiente
—	FW	Domingo Alberto Tarasconi	20 December 1903 (aged 25)	24	18	(Argentine Football Association) Boca Juniors
—	DF	Oscar Tarrío	14 April 1909 (aged 20)	0	0	(Argentine Football Association) San Lorenzo
—	MF	Adolfo Zumelzú	5 January 1902 (aged 27)	9	0	(Argentine Football Association) Sportivo Palermo

== Paraguay ==
Head coach: (Argentina) José Durand Laguna

No.	Pos.	Player	Date of birth (age)	Caps	Goals	Club
—	MF	Francisco Aguirre	30 November 1907 (aged 21)	0	0	(Paraguayan Football Association) Olimpia
—	FW	Delfín Benítez Cáceres	24 September 1910 (aged 19)	0	0	(Paraguayan Football Association) Libertad
—	DF	Abdón Benítez Casco		4	0	(Paraguayan Football Association) Libertad
—	GK	Antonio Brunetti		0	0	(Paraguayan Football Association)
—	MF	Eusebio Díaz	21 June 1898 (aged 31)	5	0	(Paraguayan Football Association) Guaraní
—	MF	Diógenes Domínguez	1 January 1902 (aged 27)	2	0	(Paraguayan Football Association) Sportivo Luqueño
—	MF	Romildo Etcheverry	15 December 1906 (aged 22)	0	0	(Paraguayan Football Association) Olimpia
—	DF	Salvador Flores	1 January 1906 (aged 23)	0	0	(Paraguayan Football Association) Cerro Porteño
—	DF	Luis Fretes		16	3	(Paraguayan Football Association) Guaraní
—	FW	Aurelio González	25 September 1905 (aged 24)	0	0	(Paraguayan Football Association) Olimpia
—	FW	Lino Nessi	1 January 1904 (aged 25)	8	0	(Paraguayan Football Association) Libertad
—	DF	Quiterio Olmedo	21 December 1907 (aged 21)	0	0	(Paraguayan Football Association) Nacional
—	MF	Andrés Santacruz		0	0	(Paraguayan Football Association)
—	FW	Porfirio Sosa Lagos		0	0	(Paraguayan Football Association)
—	FW	Pasiano Urbieta Sosa		0	0	(Paraguayan Football Association)
—	MF	Ramón Viccini		0	0	(Paraguayan Football Association)

== Peru ==
Head coach: (Uruguay) Julio Borelli

No.	Pos.	Player	Date of birth (age)	Caps	Goals	Club
—	MF	Eduardo Astengo	15 August 1905 (aged 24)	0	0	(Peruvian Football Federation) Universitario de Deportes
—		Daniel Breiding		0	0	(Peruvian Football Federation) Hidroaviación
—	FW	Juan Bulnes Pérez	27 March 1905 (aged 24)	0	0	(Peruvian Football Federation) Hidroaviación
—	MF	Alberto Denegri	7 August 1906 (aged 23)	0	0	(Peruvian Football Federation) Universitario de Deportes
—	DF	Mario de las Casas	31 January 1901 (aged 28)	0	0	(Peruvian Football Federation) Universitario de Deportes
—	MF	Plácido Galindo	9 March 1906 (aged 23)	0	0	(Peruvian Football Federation) Universitario de Deportes
—	FW	Jorge Góngora	12 October 1906 (aged 23)	0	0	(Peruvian Football Federation) Universitario de Deportes
—	FW	Agustín Lizarbe		0	0	(Peruvian Football Federation) Hidroaviación
—	DF	Antonio Maquilón	29 November 1902 (aged 26)	2	0	(Peruvian Football Federation) Sportivo Tarapacá Ferrocarril
—		Adolfo Muro		0	0	(Peruvian Football Federation) Sportivo Tarapacá Ferrocarril
—	DF	Faustino Mustafich	26 November 1903 (aged 25)	0	0	(Peruvian Football Federation) Atlético Chalaco
—	FW	Lizardo Rodríguez Nue	30 August 1910 (aged 19)	0	0	(Peruvian Football Federation) Sport Progreso
—	FW	Rodolfo Ortega		0	0	(Peruvian Football Federation) Hidroaviación
—	GK	Jorge Pardon	14 March 1905 (aged 24)	3	0	(Peruvian Football Federation) Atlético Chalaco
—	FW	Julio Ramírez		0	0	(Peruvian Football Federation) Sportivo Tarapaca Ferrocarril
—	FW	Miguel Rostaing	3 July 1900 (aged 29)	0	0	(Peruvian Football Federation) Atlético Chalaco
—	DF	Alfonso Saldarriaga	23 January 1902 (aged 27)	3	0	(Peruvian Football Federation) Hidroaviación
—	FW	Enrique Salas	20 October 1910 (aged 19)	0	0	(Peruvian Football Federation) Atlético Chalaco
—	GK	Eugenio Segalá	6 May 1899 (aged 30)	0	0	(Peruvian Football Federation) Circolo Sportivo Italiano

== Uruguay ==
Head coach: (Uruguay) Alberto Suppici

No.	Pos.	Player	Date of birth (age)	Caps	Goals	Club
—	MF	José Andrade	22 November 1901 (aged 27)	26	0	(Uruguayan Football Association) Nacional
—	DF	Pedro Arispe	30 September 1900 (aged 29)	16	0	(Uruguayan Football Association) Rampla Juniors
—	FW	Juan Pedro Arremón	8 February 1899 (aged 30)	15	2	(Uruguayan Football Association) Peñarol
—	DF	Ramón Bucetta	13 September 1894 (aged 35)	4	0	(Uruguayan Football Association) Nacional
—	FW	Antonio Campolo	7 February 1897 (aged 32)	19	1	(Uruguayan Football Association) Peñarol
—	FW	Hector Castro	29 November 1904 (aged 24)	13	13	(Uruguayan Football Association) Nacional
—	FW	Pedro Cea	1 September 1900 (aged 29)	19	8	(Uruguayan Football Association) Nacional
—	MF	Lorenzo Fernández	20 May 1900 (aged 29)	13	1	(Uruguayan Football Association) Peñarol
—	MF	Roberto Figueroa	20 March 1904 (aged 25)	6	5	(Uruguayan Football Association) Montevideo Wanderers
—	GK	Eduardo García		1	0	(Uruguayan Football Association) Sud América
—	MF	Álvaro Gestido	17 May 1907 (aged 22)	9	0	(Uruguayan Football Association) Peñarol
—	MF	José Magallanes		0	0	(Uruguayan Football Association) Rampla Juniors
—	DF	Ernesto Mascheroni	2 November 1907 (aged 21)	1	0	(Uruguayan Football Association) Olimpia
—	GK	Andrés Mazali	22 July 1902 (aged 27)	17	0	(Uruguayan Football Association) Nacional
—	DF	José Nasazzi	24 May 1901 (aged 28)	26	0	(Uruguayan Football Association) Bella Vista
—	FW	Pedro Petrone	11 May 1905 (aged 24)	24	22	(Uruguayan Football Association) Nacional
—	MF	Conduelo Píriz	17 June 1905 (aged 24)	2	0	(Uruguayan Football Association) Nacional
—	FW	Héctor Scarone	26 November 1898 (aged 30)	44	29	(Uruguayan Football Association) Nacional
—	MF	Gideon Silva	26 November 1898 (aged 30)	4	0	(Uruguayan Football Association) Peñarol
