= 1927 South American Championship squads =

List of footballers

The following squads were named for the 1927 South American Championship that took place in Peru.

== Argentina ==
Head coach: (Argentina) José Lago Millán

No.	Pos.	Player	Date of birth (age)	Caps	Goals	Club
—	GK	Ángel Bossio	5 May 1905 (aged 22)	1	0	(Argentine Football Association) Talleres (RE)
—	GK	Octavio Díaz	7 October 1900 (aged 27)	7	0	(Argentine Football Association) Rosario Central
—	DF	Ludovico Bidoglio	5 February 1900 (aged 27)	25	0	(Argentine Football Association) Boca Juniors
—	DF	Juan Evaristo	20 June 1902 (aged 25)	7	1	(Argentine Football Association) Sportivo Palermo
—	DF	Humberto Recanatini	12 July 1898 (aged 29)	11	0	(Argentine Football Association) Sportivo Almagro
—	DF	Adolfo Zumelzú	5 January 1902 (aged 25)	2	0	(Argentine Football Association) Sportivo Palermo
—	MF	José Fossa	13 August 1904 (aged 23)	0	0	(Argentine Football Association) San Lorenzo
—	MF	Luis Monti	15 May 1901 (aged 26)	2	1	(Argentine Football Association) San Lorenzo
—	FW	Alfredo Carricaberry	8 October 1900 (aged 27)	3	1	(Argentine Football Association) San Lorenzo
—	FW	Manuel Ferreira	29 July 1905 (aged 22)	1	0	(Argentine Football Association) Estudiantes (LP)
—	FW	Segundo Luna	20 April 1902 (aged 25)	0	0	(Argentine Football Association) Mitre
—	MF	Josè Maglio	22 February 1904 (aged 23)	2	0	(Argentine Football Association) San Lorenzo
—	FW	Pedro Ochoa	22 February 1900 (aged 27)	0	0	(Argentine Football Association) Racing Club
—	FW	Mumo Orsi	2 December 1901 (aged 25)	7	0	(Argentine Football Association) Independiente
—	FW	Manuel Seoane	19 March 1902 (aged 25)	14	9	(Argentine Football Association) Independiente

== Bolivia ==
Player coach: (Bolivia) Jorge Luis Valderrama

No.	Pos.	Player	Date of birth (age)	Caps	Goals	Club
—	FW	Mario Alborta	19 September 1910 (aged 17)	4	0	(Bolivian Football Federation) Club Bolívar
—	GK	Jesús Bermúdez	24 January 1902 (aged 25)	3	0	(Bolivian Football Federation) Oruro Royal
—	FW	José Bustamante	1 January 1907 (aged 20)	4	0	(Bolivian Football Federation) Club Litoral
—	DF	Casiano José Chavarría	3 August 1901 (aged 26)	3	0	(Bolivian Football Federation) Calavera La Paz
—	MF	Diógenes Lara	6 April 1903 (aged 24)	4	0	(Bolivian Football Federation) Club Bolívar
—	FW	N. Malpartida		0	0	(Bolivian Football Federation)
—	FW	Rafael Méndez	1 January 1904 (aged 23)	4	0	(Bolivian Football Federation) Universitario de La Paz
—	FW	Froilán Pinilla	1 January 1900 (aged 27)	0	0	(Bolivian Football Federation) The Strongest
—	MF	Armando Renjel		0	0	(Bolivian Football Federation) Club Bolívar
—	MF	Renato Sáinz	14 December 1899 (aged 27)	4	0	(Bolivian Football Federation) The Strongest
—	MF	Carlos Soto		4	1	(Bolivian Football Federation)
—	DF	Jorge Soto		4	0	(Bolivian Football Federation)
—	FW	José Toro		0	0	(Bolivian Football Federation) The Strongest
—	MF	Jorge Luis Valderrama	12 December 1906 (aged 20)	3	0	(Bolivian Football Federation) Oruro Royal

== Peru ==
Head coach: (Uruguay) Pedro Olivieri

No.	Pos.	Player	Date of birth (age)	Caps	Goals	Club
—	FW	Segundo Aranda		0	0	(Peruvian Football Federation) Circolo Sportivo Italiano
—	MF	Leopoldo Basurto		0	0	(Peruvian Football Federation) Association FBC
—	FW	Esteban Dagnino	13 April 1903 (aged 24)	0	0	(Peruvian Football Federation) Atlético Chalaco
—	MF	Filomeno García	1 January 1905 (aged 22)	0	0	(Peruvian Football Federation) Alianza Lima
—	FW	Jorge Koochoi Sarmiento	2 November 1900 (aged 26)	0	0	(Peruvian Football Federation) Alianza Lima
—	FW	José María Lavalle	5 June 1911 (aged 16)	0	0	(Peruvian Football Federation) Alianza Lima
—	DF	Antonio Maquilón	29 November 1902 (aged 24)	0	0	(Peruvian Football Federation) Circolo Sportivo Italiano
—	FW	Alberto Montellanos	1 January 1899 (aged 28)	0	0	(Peruvian Football Federation) Alianza Lima
—	DF	Carlos Moscoso	23 January 1902 (aged 25)	0	0	(Peruvian Football Federation) Association FBC
—	FW	Adolfo Rodolfo Muro		0	0	(Peruvian Football Federation) Circolo Sportivo Italiano
—	FW	Demetrio Neyra	15 December 1908 (aged 18)	0	0	(Peruvian Football Federation) Alianza Lima
—	GK	Jorge Pardon	14 March 1905 (aged 22)	0	0	(Peruvian Football Federation) Circolo Sportivo Italiano
—	DF	Alfonso Saldarriaga	23 January 1902 (aged 25)	0	0	(Peruvian Football Federation) Atlético Chalaco
—	GK	Eugenio Segalá	6 May 1899 (aged 28)	0	0	(Peruvian Football Federation) Alianza Lima
—	MF	Santiago Ulloa		0	0	(Peruvian Football Federation) Sportivo Tarapacá Ferrocarril
—	FW	Alejandro Villanueva	4 June 1908 (aged 19)	0	0	(Peruvian Football Federation) Alianza Lima

== Uruguay ==
Head coach: (Uruguay) Luis Grecco

No.	Pos.	Player	Date of birth (age)	Caps	Goals	Club
—	GK	Miguel Cappuccini	5 January 1904 (aged 23)	3	0	(Uruguayan Football Association) Montevideo Wanderers
—	GK	Andrés Mazali	22 July 1902 (aged 25)	10	0	(Uruguayan Football Association) Nacional
—	DF	Venancio Bartibás	18 May 1906 (aged 21)	0	0	(Uruguayan Football Association) Central Español
—	DF	Ramón Bucetta	13 September 1894 (aged 33)	1	0	(Uruguayan Football Association) Nacional
—	DF	Adhemar Canavessi	18 August 1903 (aged 24)	0	0	(Uruguayan Football Association) Bella Vista
—	DF	Domingo Tejera	9 July 1899 (aged 28)	13	0	(Uruguayan Football Association) Montevideo Wanderers
—	MF	José Andrade	22 November 1901 (aged 25)	15	0	(Uruguayan Football Association) Nacional
—	MF	Lorenzo Fernández	20 May 1900 (aged 27)	3	0	(Uruguayan Football Association) Capurro
—	MF	José Vanzzino	5 July 1893 (aged 34)	34	0	(Uruguayan Football Association) Nacional
—	FW	Juan Anselmo	30 April 1902 (aged 25)	0	0	(Uruguayan Football Association) Peñarol
—	FW	Juan Pedro Arremón	8 February 1899 (aged 28)	7	1	(Uruguayan Football Association) Peñarol
—	FW	Hector Castro	29 November 1904 (aged 22)	6	9	(Uruguayan Football Association) Nacional
—	FW	Santiago Celsi		0	0	(Uruguayan Football Association) Defensor Sporting
—	MF	Roberto Figueroa	20 March 1904 (aged 23)	2	1	(Uruguayan Football Association) Montevideo Wanderers
—	FW	Pedro Petrone	11 May 1905 (aged 22)	14	14	(Uruguayan Football Association) Nacional
—	FW	Antonio Sacco		4	0	(Uruguayan Football Association) Peñarol
—	FW	Héctor Scarone	26 November 1898 (aged 28)	38	23	(Uruguayan Football Association) Nacional
