= Argentina at the Copa América =

Argentina at Copa América football tournament

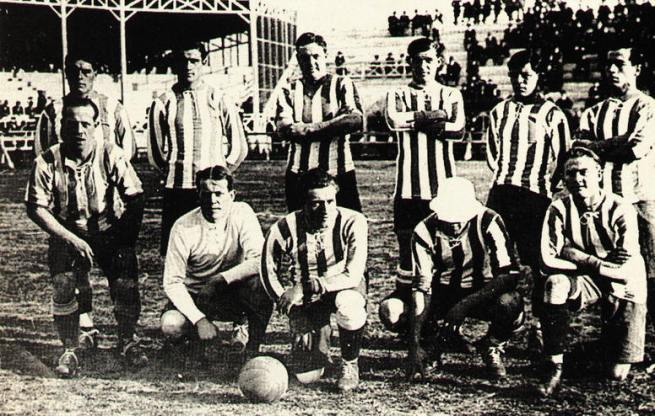
The Argentina squad that contested the first Copa América (then "South American Championship") held in 1916

The Copa América is South America's major tournament in senior men's football and determines the continental champion. Until 1967, the tournament was known as "South American Championship". It is the oldest continental championship in the world with its first edition held in 1916.

Argentina has won the tournament sixteen times, the most of any team. They also lead the all-time table, have the highest number of victories and hold various other records.

Argentina are the only team to win the title three consecutive times (1945–1947). The last time they won the tournament was in 2024. In 2015 and 2016, they proceeded to the final, only to lose to Chile in a penalty shoot-out on both occasions, even though they have never once lost to Chile over regular time in tournament history (30 matches).

== Overall record ==
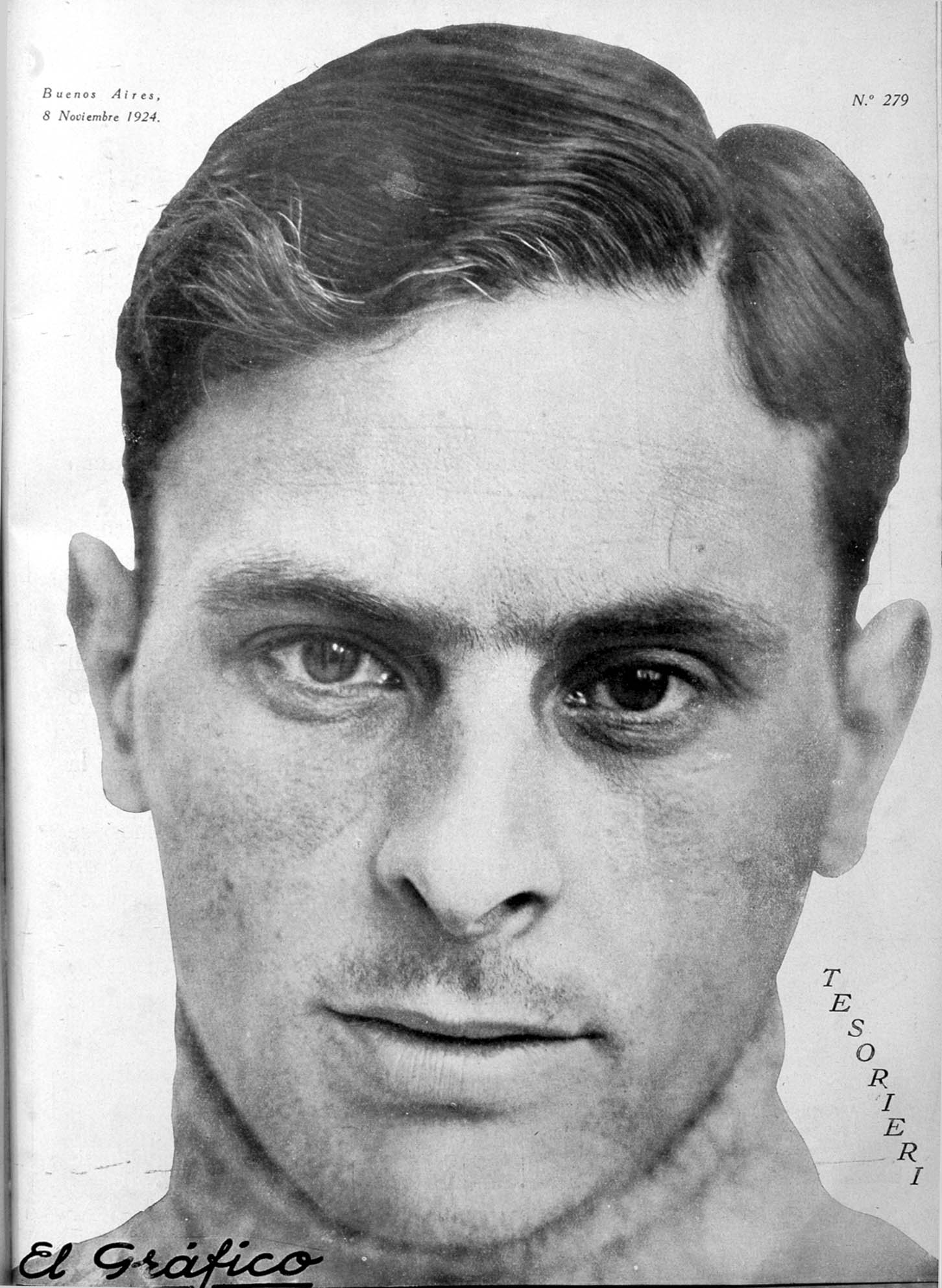
Américo Tesoriere was Argentina's first choice goalkeeper in six tournaments in the 1920s. In 1921, he became the first goalkeeper, and the first Argentinian to receive the best player award.

South American Championship / Copa América record
Year	Round	Position	Pld	W	D*	L	GF	GA	Squad
(Argentina) 1916	Runners-up	2nd	3	1	2	0	7	2	Squad
(Uruguay) 1917	Runners-up	2nd	3	2	0	1	5	3	Squad
(Brazil) 1919	Third place	3rd	3	1	0	2	7	7	Squad
(Chile) 1920	Runners-up	2nd	3	1	2	0	4	2	Squad
(Argentina) 1921	Champions	1st	3	3	0	0	5	0	Squad
(Brazil) 1922	Fourth place	4th	4	2	0	2	6	3	Squad
(Uruguay) 1923	Runners-up	2nd	3	2	0	1	6	6	Squad
(Uruguay) 1924	Runners-up	2nd	3	1	2	0	2	0	Squad
(Argentina) 1925	Champions	1st	4	3	1	0	11	4	Squad
(Chile) 1926	Runners-up	2nd	4	2	1	1	14	3	Squad
(Peru) 1927	Champions	1st	3	3	0	0	15	4	Squad
(Argentina) 1929	Champions	1st	3	3	0	0	9	1	Squad
(Peru) 1935	Runners-up	2nd	3	2	0	1	8	5	Squad
(Argentina) 1937	Champions	1st	6	5	0	1	14	5	Squad
(Peru) 1939	Withdrew								
(Chile) 1941	Champions	1st	4	4	0	0	10	2	Squad
(Uruguay) 1942	Runners-up	2nd	6	4	1	1	21	6	Squad
(Chile) 1945	Champions	1st	6	5	1	0	22	5	Squad
(Argentina) 1946	Champions	1st	5	5	0	0	17	3	Squad
(Ecuador) 1947	Champions	1st	7	6	1	0	28	4	Squad
(Brazil) 1949	Withdrew								
(Peru) 1953	Withdrew								
(Chile) 1955	Champions	1st	5	4	1	0	18	6	Squad
(Uruguay) 1956	Third place	3rd	5	3	0	2	5	3	Squad
(Peru) 1957	Champions	1st	6	5	0	1	25	6	Squad
(Argentina) 1959	Champions	1st	6	5	1	0	19	5	Squad
(Ecuador) 1959	Runners-up	2nd	4	2	1	1	9	9	Squad
(Bolivia) 1963	Third place	3rd	6	3	1	2	15	10	Squad
(Uruguay) 1967	Runners-up	2nd	5	4	0	1	12	3	Squad
1975	Group stage	5th	4	2	0	2	17	4	Squad
1979	Group stage	8th	4	1	1	2	7	6	Squad
1983	Group stage	6th	4	1	3	0	5	4	Squad
(Argentina) 1987	Fourth place	4th	4	1	1	2	5	4	Squad
(Brazil) 1989	Third place	3rd	7	2	3	2	2	4	Squad
(Chile) 1991	Champions	1st	7	6	1	0	16	6	Squad
(Ecuador) 1993	Champions	1st	6	2	4	0	6	4	Squad
(Uruguay) 1995	Quarter-finals	5th	4	2	1	1	8	6	Squad
(Bolivia) 1997	Quarter-finals	6th	4	1	2	1	4	3	Squad
(Paraguay) 1999	Quarter-finals	8th	4	2	0	2	6	6	Squad
(Colombia) 2001	Withdrew								
(Peru) 2004	Runners-up	2nd	6	4	1	1	16	6	Squad
(Venezuela) 2007	Runners-up	2nd	6	5	0	1	16	6	Squad
(Argentina) 2011	Quarter-finals	7th	4	1	3	0	5	2	Squad
(Chile) 2015	Runners-up	2nd	6	3	3	0	10	3	Squad
(United States) 2016	Runners-up	2nd	6	5	1	0	18	2	Squad
(Brazil) 2019	Third place	3rd	6	3	1	2	7	6	Squad
(Brazil) 2021	Champions	1st	7	5	2	0	12	3	Squad
(United States) 2024	Champions	1st	6	5	1	0	9	1	Squad
Total	16 Titles	44/48	208	132	43	33	483	183	—

== Decisive matches and finals ==
In the era of the South American Championship, round robins were more commonly played than knock-out tournaments. Listed are the decisive matches which secured Argentina the respective titles.

Year	Match type	Opponent	Result	Manager	Goalscorer(s)	Final location
(Argentina) 1921	Round robin	Uruguay	1–0	(Argentina) Pedro Calomino	J. Libonatti	Buenos Aires
(Argentina) 1925	Round robin	Brazil	2–2	(Argentina) Américo Tesoriere	A. Cerroti, M. Seoane	Buenos Aires
(Peru) 1927	Round robin	Peru	5–1	(Spain) José Lago Millán	M. Ferreira (2), J. Maglio (2), A. Carricaberry	Lima
(Argentina) 1929	Round robin	Uruguay	2–0	(Argentina) Francisco Olazar	M. Ferreira, M. Evaristo	Buenos Aires
(Argentina) 1937	Final (play-off)	Brazil	2–0 (a.e.t.)	(Argentina) Manuel Seoane	V. De la Mata (2)	Buenos Aires
(Chile) 1941	Round robin	Chile	1–0	(Argentina) Guillermo Stábile	E. García	Santiago de Chile
(Chile) 1945	Round robin	Uruguay	1–0	(Argentina) Guillermo Stábile	R. Martino	Santiago de Chile
(Argentina) 1946	Round robin	Brazil	2–0	(Argentina) Guillermo Stábile	N. Méndez	Buenos Aires
(Ecuador) 1947	Round robin	Uruguay	3–1	(Argentina) Guillermo Stábile	N. Méndez (2), F. Loustau	Guayaquil
(Chile) 1955	Round robin	Chile	1–0	(Argentina) Guillermo Stábile	R. Micheli	Santiago de Chile
(Peru) 1957	Round robin	Brazil	3–0	(Argentina) Guillermo Stábile	A. Angelillo, H. Maschio, O. Cruz	Lima
(Argentina) 1959	Round robin	Brazil	1–1	(Argentina) Victorio Spinetto	J. Pizzuti	Buenos Aires
(Chile) 1991	Final Round robin	Colombia	2–1	(Argentina) Alfio Basile	D. Simeone, G. Batistuta	Santiago de Chile
(Ecuador) 1993	Final	Mexico	2–1	(Argentina) Alfio Basile	G. Batistuta (2)	Guayaquil
(Brazil) 2021	Final	Brazil	1–0	(Argentina) Lionel Scaloni	Á. Di María	Rio de Janeiro
(United States) 2024	Final	Colombia	1–0 (a.e.t.)	(Argentina) Lionel Scaloni	La. Martínez	Miami Gardens

== Record by opponent ==
Argentina has only positive head-to-head-records at the Copa América. Four out of nine CONMEBOL members have never beaten the Albiceleste in regulation time in a combined 79 attempts.

Copa América matches (by team)
Opponent	W	D	L	Pld	GF	GA
Bolivia	12	2	2	16	50	10
Brazil	16	8	10	34	53	40
Canada	2	0	0	2	4	0
Chile	22*	8	0	30	62	15
Colombia	8	5	3	16	40	17
Costa Rica	1	0	0	1	3	0
Ecuador	11	6	0	17	56	13
Jamaica	1	0	0	1	1	0
Mexico	2	1	1	4	6	3
Panama	1	0	0	1	5	0
Paraguay	20	6	0	26	78	23
Peru	13	2	3	18	42	19
Qatar	1	0	0	1	2	0
United States	2	0	1	3	8	4
Uruguay	15	4	13	32	43	36
Venezuela	6	0	0	6	30	3
Total	132	43	33	208	483	183

* includes a 0–0 draw awarded to Argentina in 1942.

== Record players ==
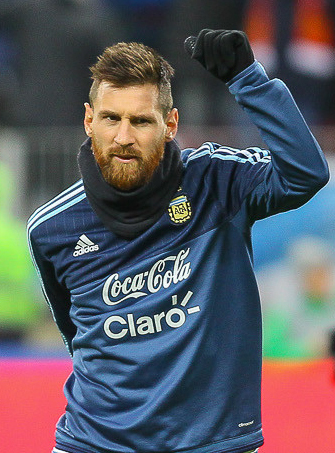
Lionel Messi is the top appearance-maker in the Copa América. He is also the first and only Argentine to feature in seven different editions of the competition.

Rank	Player	Matches	Tournaments
1	Lionel Messi	39	2007, 2011, 2015, 2016, 2019, 2021 and 2024
2	Ángel Di María	28	2011, 2015, 2016, 2019, 2021 and 2024
3	Nicolás Otamendi	27	2015, 2016, 2019, 2021 and 2024
4	Javier Mascherano	26	2004, 2007, 2011, 2015 and 2016
5	Sergio Agüero	24	2011, 2015, 2016, 2019 and 2021
6	Javier Zanetti	22	1995, 1999, 2004, 2007 and 2011
7	José Salomón	21	1941, 1942, 1945 and 1946
7	Oscar Ruggeri	21	1987, 1989, 1991 and 1993
9	Américo Tesoriere	20	1920, 1921, 1922, 1923, 1924 and 1925
10	Diego Simeone	19	1991, 1993, 1995 and 1999
10	Roberto Ayala	19	1995, 1999, 2004 and 2007
10	Carlos Tevez	19	2004, 2007, 2011 and 2015

Seven Argentinian players have won the South American Championship three times each. Manuel Seoane (1925, 1927 and 1929) also won the title as coach in 1937. The others are Vicente de la Mata (1937, 1945, 1946), José Salomón (1941, 1945, 1946), Mario Boyé, Félix Loustau, Norberto Méndez and René Pontoni (all 1945, 1946, 1947).

== Top goalscorers ==
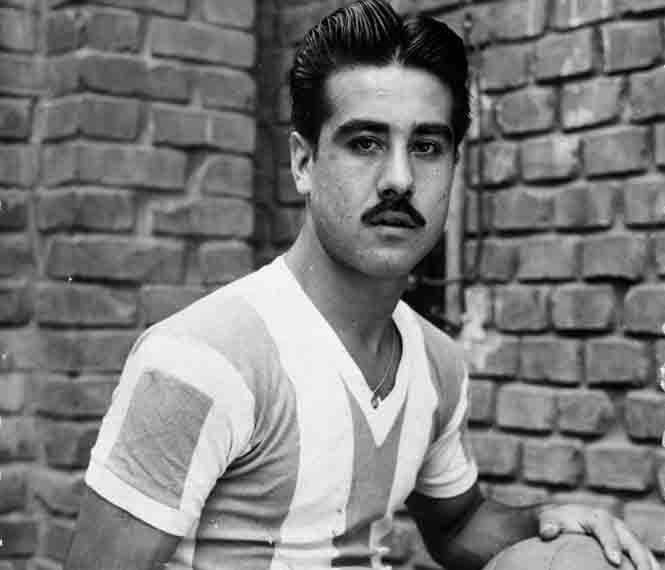
Norberto Méndez scored at least five goals at each of the three Copa América tournaments from 1945 to 1947, where Argentina remained unbeaten. With 17 goals total, he holds the joint-record for top scorer at the Copa América along with Brazil's Zizinho.

Rank	Player	Goals	Tournaments (goals)
1	Norberto Méndez	17	1945 (6), 1946 (5) and 1947 (6)
2	Lionel Messi	14	2007 (2), 2015 (1), 2016 (5), 2019 (1), 2021 (4) and 2024 (1)
3	José Manuel Moreno	13	1941 (3), 1942 (7) and 1947 (3)
3	Gabriel Batistuta	13	1991 (6), 1993 (3) and 1995 (4)
5	Herminio Masantonio	11	1935 (4) and 1942 (7)
6	Ángel Labruna	10	1946 (5), 1955 (3) and 1956 (2)
6	Lautaro Martínez	10	2019 (2), 2021 (3) and 2024 (5)
8	Humberto Maschio	9	1957
8	Sergio Agüero	9	2011 (3), 2015 (3), 2016 (1) and 2019 (2)
10	Manuel Seoane	8	1925 (6) and 1927 (2)
10	René Pontoni	8	1945 (4) and 1947 (4)
10	Rodolfo Micheli	8	1955
10	Antonio Angelillo	8	1957

== Awards and records ==
Team awards

- Champions (16): 1921, 1925, 1927, 1929, 1937, 1941, 1945, 1946, 1947, 1955, 1957, 1959 (Argentina), 1991, 1993, 2021, 2024
- Runners-up (14): 1916, 1917, 1920, 1923, 1924, 1926, 1935, 1942, 1959 (Ecuador), 1967, 2004, 2007, 2015, 2016
- Third place (5): 1919, 1956, 1963, 1989, 2019
- Fair Play Award: 2016

Individual awards

- MVP 1921: Américo Tesoriere
- MVP 1925: Manuel Seoane
- MVP 1929: Manuel Ferreira
- MVP 1937: Vicente de la Mata
- MVP 1946: Adolfo Pedernera
- MVP 1947: José Manuel Moreno
- MVP 1957: Enrique Sívori
- MVP 1991: Leonardo Rodríguez
- MVP 1993: Sergio Goycochea
- MVP 2021: Lionel Messi
- Top scorer 1921: Julio Libonatti (3 goals)
- Top scorer 1922: Julio Francia (4 goals)
- Top scorer 1923: Vicente Aguirre (3 goals) (shared)
- Top scorer 1925: Manuel Seoane (6 goals)
- Top scorer 1927: Alfredo Carricaberry and Segundo Luna (3 goals each) (shared)
- Top scorer 1935: Herminio Masantonio (4 goals)
- Top scorer 1941: Juan Marvezzi (5 goals)
- Top scorer 1942: Herminio Masantonio and José Moreno (7 goals each) (shared)
- Top scorer 1945: Norberto Méndez (6 goals) (shared)
- Top scorer 1955: Rodolfo Micheli (8 goals)
- Top scorer 1957: Humberto Maschio (9 goals) (shared)
- Top scorer 1959 (Ecuador): José Sanfilippo (6 goals)
- Top scorer 1967: Luis Artime (5 goals)
- Top scorer 1975: Leopoldo Luque (4 goals) (shared)
- Top scorer 1983: Jorge Burruchaga (3 goals) (shared)
- Top scorer 1991: Gabriel Batistuta (6 goals)
- Top scorer 1995: Gabriel Batistuta (4 goals) (shared)
- Top scorer 2021: Lionel Messi (4 goals) (shared)
- Top scorer 2024: Lautaro Martínez (5 goals)
- Best young player 2007: Lionel Messi
- Best goalkeeper 2021: Emiliano Martínez
- Best goalkeeper 2024: Emiliano Martínez

In 2015, no award for Most Valuable Player was given after Lionel Messi reportedly rejected it.

Team records

- Most victories (132)
- Most goals (483)
- Most consecutive titles (3, 1945–1947)
- Highest victory (12–0 over Ecuador on 22 January 1942)

Individual records

- Most goals: Norberto Méndez (17, shared with Zizinho)
- Most assists: Lionel Messi (18)
- Most man of the match awards: Lionel Messi (15)
- Most man of the match awards in a single tournament: Lionel Messi (4, 2015 and 2021, shared with James Rodríguez, 2024)
- Most matches: Lionel Messi (39)
- Most titles as manager: Guillermo Stábile (6 titles)

== See also ==
- Argentina at the FIFA World Cup
