= 1925 South American Championship squads =

List of footballers

These are the squads for the countries that played in the 1925 South American Championship. The participating countries were Argentina, Brazil and Paraguay. The teams plays in a single round-robin tournament, earning two points for a win, one point for a draw, and zero points for a loss.

== Argentina ==
Head Coach: (Argentina) Américo Tesoriere

No.	Pos.	Player	Date of birth (age)	Caps	Goals	Club
—	FW	Juan Bianchi		0	0	(Argentine Football Association) Progresista
—	DF	Ludovico Bidoglio	5 February 1900 (aged 25)	16	0	(Argentine Football Association) Boca Juniors
—	FW	Antonio Cerrotti	14 July 1901 (aged 24)	2	0	(Argentine Football Association) Boca Juniors
—	FW	Alejandro de los Santos	17 May 1902 (aged 23)	4	0	(Argentine Football Association) El Porvenir
—	MF	Mario Fortunato	19 March 1905 (aged 20)	3	0	(Argentine Football Association) Boca Juniors
—	FW	Alfredo Garasini	1 June 1897 (aged 28)	1	0	(Argentine Football Association) Boca Juniors
—	MF	Juan Carlos Irurieta		1	1	(Argentine Football Association) Argentino de Quilmes
—	DF	Ángel Médici	20 December 1897 (aged 27)	18	0	(Argentine Football Association) Boca Juniors
—	DF	Ramón Muttis	12 March 1899 (aged 26)	3	0	(Argentine Football Association) Boca Juniors
—	FW	Martín Sánchez		0	0	(Argentine Football Association) Colón
—	FW	Manuel Seoane	19 March 1902 (aged 23)	9	3	(Argentine Football Association) El Porvenir
—	FW	Domingo Tarasconi	20 December 1903 (aged 21)	9	5	(Argentine Football Association) Boca Juniors
—	GK	Américo Tesoriere	18 March 1899 (aged 26)	34	0	(Argentine Football Association) Boca Juniors
—	MF	Luis Vaccaro	6 November 1898 (aged 27)	7	0	(Argentine Football Association) Argentinos Juniors

== Brazil ==
Head Coach: (Brazil) Joaquim Guimarães and (Uruguay) Ramón Platero

No.	Pos.	Player	Date of birth (age)	Caps	Goals	Club
—	GK	Batalha	28 April 1896 (aged 29)	0	0	(Brazilian Football Confederation) Flamengo
—	DF	Clodô	1 December 1899 (aged 25)	1	0	(Brazilian Football Confederation) Paulistano
—	FW	Filó	26 December 1905 (aged 19)	0	0	(Brazilian Football Confederation) Paulistano
—	MF	Floriano	14 May 1903 (aged 22)	0	0	(Brazilian Football Confederation) Fluminense
—	MF	Fortes	9 September 1901 (aged 24)	11	0	(Brazilian Football Confederation) Fluminense
—	FW	Friedenreich	18 July 1892 (aged 33)	12	5	(Brazilian Football Confederation) Paulistano
—	DF	Hélcio	2 October 1903 (aged 22)	0	0	(Brazilian Football Confederation) Flamengo
—	FW	Lagarto	17 June 1898 (aged 27)	0	0	(Brazilian Football Confederation) Fluminense
—	FW	Moderato	14 July 1902 (aged 23)	0	0	(Brazilian Football Confederation) Flamengo
—	MF	Nascimento	3 January 1904 (aged 21)	0	0	(Brazilian Football Confederation) Fluminense
—	FW	Nilo	3 April 1903 (aged 22)	6	4	(Brazilian Football Confederation) Fluminense
—	FW	Oswaldinho	16 May 1904 (aged 21)	0	0	(Brazilian Football Confederation) América (RJ)
—	MF	Pamplona	24 March 1904 (aged 21)	0	0	(Brazilian Football Confederation) Botafogo
—	DF	Pennaforte	19 April 1905 (aged 20)	6	0	(Brazilian Football Confederation) Flamengo
—	DF	Rueda	8 March 1900 (aged 25)	0	0	(Brazilian Football Confederation) Corinthians
—	FW	Russinho	18 December 1902 (aged 22)	0	0	(Brazilian Football Confederation) Vasco da Gama
—	GK	Tuffy	6 June 1899 (aged 26)	0	0	(Brazilian Football Confederation) Syrio

== Paraguay ==
Head Coach: (Paraguay) Manuel Fleitas Solich

No.	Pos.	Player	Date of birth (age)	Caps	Goals	Club
—	GK	Modesto Denis	9 March 1901 (aged 24)	10	0	(Paraguayan Football Association) Nacional
—	GK	Carlos Torres		1	0	(Paraguayan Football Association)
—	DF	Abdón Benítez Casco		1	0	(Paraguayan Football Association) Libertad
—	DF	Félix López de Filippis		0	0	(Paraguayan Football Association)
—	DF	César Mena Porta		2	0	(Paraguayan Football Association) Olimpia
—	MF	Mariano Álvarez		0	0	(Paraguayan Football Association)
—	MF	Eusebio Díaz	21 June 1898 (aged 27)	4	0	(Paraguayan Football Association) Guaraní
—	MF	Manuel Fleitas Solich	30 December 1900 (aged 24)	11	1	(Paraguayan Football Association) Nacional
—	MF	Gaspar Nessi		1	0	(Paraguayan Football Association) Libertad
—	FW	Bartolomé Brizuela		0	0	(Paraguayan Football Association) Nacional
—	FW	Ramón Casco		0	0	(Paraguayan Football Association) Olimpia
—	FW	Diógenes Domínguez	1 January 1902 (aged 23)	0	0	(Paraguayan Football Association) Sportivo Luqueño
—	FW	Luis Fretes		9	2	(Paraguayan Football Association) Guaraní
—	FW	Silvio Molinas		3	0	(Paraguayan Football Association) Olimpia
—	FW	Lino Nessi	1 January 1904 (aged 21)	0	0	(Paraguayan Football Association) Libertad
—	FW	Julio Ramírez		0	0	(Paraguayan Football Association) Nacional
—	FW	Gerardo Rivas		14	3	(Paraguayan Football Association) Libertad
