= Luis Weihmuller =

Argentine footballer

Luis Weihmüller
Personal information
- Full name: Luis Francisco Weihmüller
- Date of birth: 5 August 1902
- Place of birth: Villa María, Córdoba, Argentina
- Date of death: 1963
- Position: Defender

Senior career*
Years	Team	Apps	(Gls)
1923–1925	Belgrano de Córdoba		
1925	River Plate		
1926–1930	Sportivo Palermo		

International career
1928–1930	Argentina		
Medal record
Representing Argentina
Football
Olympic Games
Silver medal – second place	1928 Amsterdam	Football
FIFA World Cup
Silver medal – second place	1930 Argentina	Football
- * Club domestic league appearances and goals

Luis Weihmüller (5 August 1902 – 1963) was an Argentine footballer. He was part of Argentina's squad for the 1928 Summer Olympics, but he did not play in any matches.

== Early life ==
Weihmüller was born and lived his first years in San Carlos Centro, Argentina. He was born in 1902 (according to his family on the 5 August). He was the son of Swiss immigrants. As a child everyone called him "Sity".

== The 1928 Olympics ==
Prior to the 1928 Olympics, Luis F. Weihmüller was summoned to join the Argentinian squad that had a number of players who would star two years later in the 1930 World Cup played in Uruguay. The strange thing was that, in those years, managers were not allowed in the rules to replace a player with another. Anyway, as a member of that squad, Weihmüller won a silver medal. In the Argentine squad, there were five other players from Sportivo Palermo, which was Weihmüller's current team: Fernando Paternoster, Adolfo Zumelzu, Ludovico Bidoglio, Herman, and Juan Evaristo.
