= Andrés Mazali =

Uruguayan footballer (1902-1975)

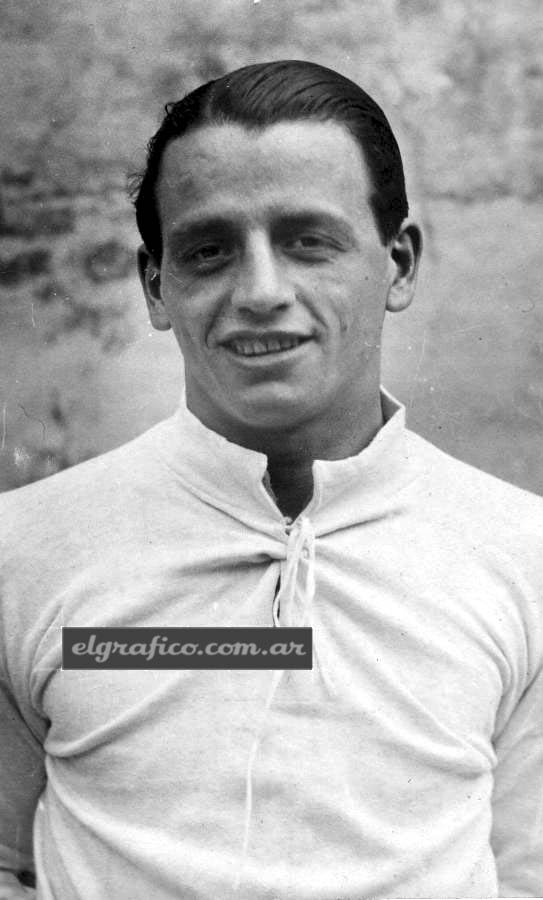

Personal information
- Date of birth: 22 July 1902
- Place of birth: Montevideo, Uruguay
- Date of death: 30 October 1975 (aged 73)
- Place of death: Montevideo, Uruguay
- Position: Goalkeeper

Senior career*
Years	Team	Apps	(Gls)
1919–1930	Nacional	267	(12)

International career
1923–1929	Uruguay	20	(0)
Medal record
Representing Uruguay
Men's Football
Olympic Games
Gold medal – first place	1924 Paris	Team competition
Gold medal – first place	1928 Amsterdam	Team competition
South American Championship
Winner	1923 Uruguay
Winner	1924 Uruguay
Winner	1926 Chile
Runner-up	1927 Peru
Third place	1929 Argentina
- * Club domestic league appearances and goals

Andrés Mazali Gini (22 July 1902 – 30 October 1975), nicknamed as El Buzo (The Diver), was a goalkeeper who played for the Uruguay national team. He spent his entire club career with Nacional. He was a twice Olympic gold medalist for Uruguay in the 1924 Olympics and 1928 Olympics. He became famous for his decision to break curfew in the days leading up to the start of the first FIFA World Cup in Uruguay, deciding to go out on a date with a mystery blonde.

== International debut ==
Mazali, a member of the Nacional side that won three consecutive domestic titles between 1922 and 1924 (the side only conceded 29 goals in those three, turbulent seasons; Peñarol were banned from the national league in 1923), made his debut on 26 May 1924 in an Olympic Games fixture against Yugoslavia in Colombes, Paris, having won his place from Pedro Casella who, at the time, was plying his trade with Rampla Juniors. Uruguay won that fixture 7–0 and he conceded only two goals on his way to the Olympic title. By the time of the 1924 South American Championship his place behind his captain José Nasazzi was assured, where he conceded only one goal on his way to achieving victory with Uruguay.

== South American Championships ==
His place was taken at the 1926 South American Championship by Fausto Batignani of Liverpool Montevideo and in 1927 by Miguel Capuccini of Montevideo Wanderers F.C. When Mazali did regain his position (recalled into Primo Giannoti's Olympic squad prior to Amsterdam) he regained his form as well. He conceded only five goals on his way to a second Olympic Gold Medal; in the 1929 South American Championship, however, in Buenos Aires, both he and the team suffered ill-form, he conceding six goals and the Uruguayans finishing in 3rd place overall. His last match for the national side was a 2-0 defeat to the Argentinians in Buenos Aires in the last match of the competition in November, 1929.

== Breaking curfew ==
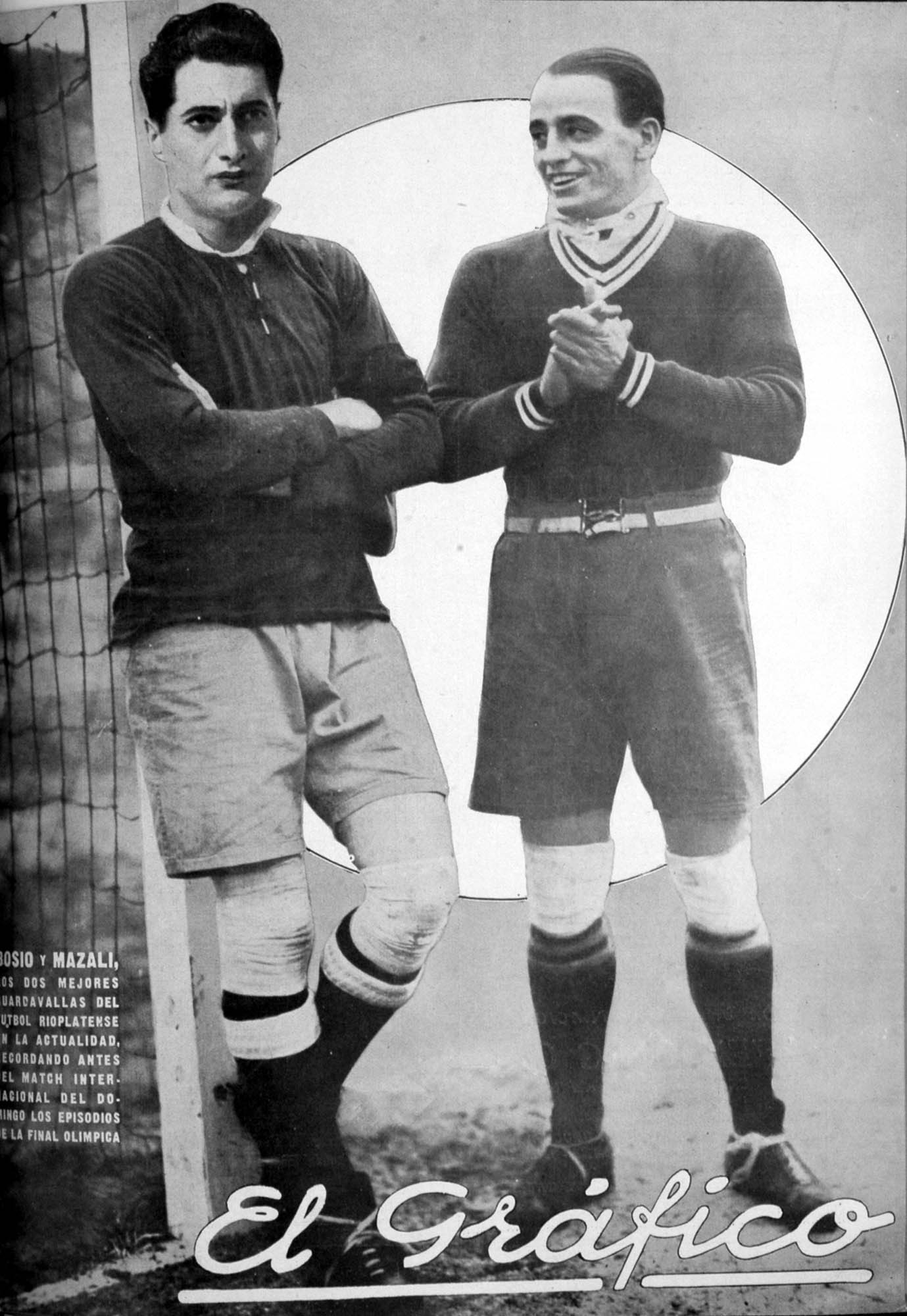
Mazali (right), next to Ángel Bossio, the rivals of the final of the 1928 Olympic Games

When in Montevideo for the 1930 FIFA World Cup, the Uruguayans were under strict instructions from Alberto Suppici not to leave the team hotel beyond curfew hours. At one point close to the tournament Mazali breached the curfew and was, thereafter, banned from participating in the tournament by Supicci and never played for Uruguay again. His place at the tournament was taken by Enrique Ballesteros of Rampla Juniors.

Mazali was one of eight players who became double Gold medalists, along with José Leandro Andrade, Pedro Arispe, Pedro Cea, José Nasazzi, Pedro Petrone, Héctor Scarone and Santos Urdinarán. Except for the second, all became World Champions under Alberto Suppici.

== Other sports ==
Besides football, Mazali also excelled in other sports. In athletics, he was the 1920 South American champion of the 400 metres hurdles in Chile. In basketball, he played for 6 years for Olimpia, he played the finals of the Uruguayan Federal Tournament against Defensor Sporting Club (basketball) in 1923, winning the championship with his team.

== Honours ==
Club

- Uruguayan Primera División: (5)
  - 1919, 1920, 1922, 1923, 1924
- Copa Aldao: (2)
  - 1919, 1920

International

- Olympics: (2)
  - 1924, 1928
- South American Championship: (3)
  - 1923, 1924, 1926
