= Edmundo Piaggio =

Argentine footballer

Personal information
- Date of birth: 3 October 1905
- Place of birth: Lanús, Argentina
- Date of death: 27 July 1975 (aged 69)
- Position: Defender

Senior career*
Years	Team	Apps	(Gls)
1930–1931	Club Atlético Lanús	0	(0)
1932–1934	Boca Juniors	57	(0)
1935–	Club Atlético Lanús	33	(0)
Total		90	(0)

International career
1930	Argentina		
Medal record
Men's Football
Representing Argentina
Copa América
Winner	1929 Argentina	Team
FIFA World Cup
Runner-up	1930 Uruguay	Team
- * Club domestic league appearances and goals

Edmundo Piaggio (3 October 1905 – 27 July 1975) was an Argentine football defender. He played in Lanús and Boca Juniors.

== Honours ==
Boca Juniors

- Argentine Primera División: 1934 LAF

Argentina

- Copa América: 1929
- FIFA World Cup runner-up: 1930
