= Carlos Nascimento =

Carlos Nascimento may refer to:

- Carlos Nascimento (footballer)
- Carlos Nascimento (athlete)
- Carlos Nascimento (journalist)
- Carlos Henrique Rodrigues do Nascimento, Brazilian basketball player
