= Rodolfo Orlandini =

Argentine footballer

Personal information
- Date of birth: 1 January 1905
- Place of birth: Buenos Aires, Argentina
- Date of death: 24 December 1990 (aged 85)
- Height: 1.83 m (6 ft 0 in)
- Position: Midfielder

Senior career*
Years	Team	Apps	(Gls)
?–1929	Sportivo Buenos Aires		
1930	Estudiantil Porteño		
1930–1936	Genoa	81	(7)
1936–1938	OGC Nice		

International career
1927–1930	Argentina	10	(0)

Managerial career
- 1945: Ecuador
- 1949–1951: El Salvador
- 1957: Unión Magdalena
- 1957: Colombia
- 1960: Deportivo Morón
- 1961: Temperley
- 1963: San Telmo
Medal record
Men's Football
Representing Argentina
Copa América
Winner	1929 Argentina	Team
FIFA World Cup
Runner-up	1930 Uruguay	Team
Olympic Games
Silver medal – second place	1928 Amsterdam	Team
- * Club domestic league appearances and goals

Rodolfo Orlando Orlandini (1 January 1905 – 24 December 1990) was an Argentine football (soccer) midfielder who played for the Argentina national team between 1927 and 1930.

== Club career ==
Orlandini played club football in Argentina for Sportivo Buenos Aires and Estudiantil Porteño before moving to Italy in 1930 to play for Genoa C.F.C. In 1936 he moved to France where he played for Nice.

== International career ==
Orlandini played in the 1928 Olympic football tournament where Argentina came second to Uruguay. In 1929 he played in the Copa América which was won by Argentina. He also participated in the first ever World Cup in 1930, where Argentina again finished second behind Uruguay.

== Managerial career ==
After retiring as a player Orlandini went on to become a manager, he coached the Colombia national team during the qualifiers for the 1958 World Cup.

== Honours ==
Genoa CFC

- Serie B: 1934-35

Argentina

- Copa América: 1929
- Summer Olympics Silver Medal: 1928
- FIFA World Cup runner-up: 1930
