= Alberto Suppici =

Uruguayan footballer and manager (1898–1981)

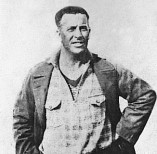

Personal information
- Full name: Alberto Horacio Suppici
- Date of birth: 20 November 1898
- Place of birth: Colonia del Sacramento, Uruguay
- Date of death: 21 June 1981 (aged 82)
- Place of death: Montevideo, Uruguay
- Height: 1.67 m (5 ft 5 1/2 in)
- Position: Left half

Senior career*
Years	Team	Apps	(Gls)
1915–1923	Nacional	143	(6)

Managerial career
- 1928–1932: Uruguay
- 1935: Central Español
- 1938: Montevideo Wanderers
- 1935–1941: Uruguay
- 1945: Peñarol
Medal record
Men's football
Representing Uruguay (as a manager)
FIFA World Cup
Winner	1930 Uruguay
South American Championship
Runner-up	1939 Peru
Third place	1929 Argentina
Third place	1937 Argentina
- * Club domestic league appearances and goals

Alberto Horacio Suppici (20 November 1898 – 21 June 1981) was a Uruguayan footballer and coach who won the first ever FIFA World Cup, leading the Uruguay team in the 1930 tournament on home soil. Suppici is known as el Profesor (the Professor).

== Biography ==
On 22 April 1917, Suppici founded the football club Plaza Colonia in Colonia del Sacramento, his hometown. The club's 12 000-capacity home ground has been named Estadio Profesor Alberto Suppici in his honour.

As technical director of Uruguay, Suppici coached the side to third in the 1929 South American Championship, the precursor to the modern Copa América.

At the inaugural FIFA World Cup in his home nation of Uruguay, Suppici dropped goalkeeper Andrés Mazali, who had won a gold medal in the 1928 Olympic final, from the national team after he was caught breaking curfew and failing to arrive at the team hotel in time in Montevideo prior to the tournament. Suppici led the side to victory in the final over Argentina at Estadio Centenario in Montevideo, masterminding a second-half comeback from 2–1 down to win 4–2 in front of 93,000 people. Suppici's technical staff at the tournament included Pedro Arispe, Ernesto Figoli, Luis Greco and Pedro Olivieri. He is the youngest ever coach to win the World Cup, aged only 31.

== Honours ==
=== Domestic ===
Peñarol

- Uruguayan Primera División: 1945

=== International ===
Uruguay

- FIFA World Cup: 1930
- Copa América runner-up: 1939; third place: 1929, 1937

Years	Coach	P	W	D	L	GF	GA	Win %	Tournaments
1928–1932	Alberto Suppici	12	6	2	4	24	16	50.00	(silver) 1928 Copa Lipton – Runners-up; (gold) 1929 Copa Newton – Champions; (gold) 1929 Copa Lipton – Champions; (bronze) 1929 South American Championship – Third Place; (gold) 1930 FIFA World Cup – Champions; (silver) 1931 Taça Rio Branco – Runners-up; (silver) 1932 Taça Rio Branco – Runners-up
1935–1941	Alberto Suppici (2nd time)	24	11	1	12	47	46	45.83	(silver) 1935 Copa Juan Mignaburu – Runners-up; (silver) 1936 Copa Juan Mignaburu – Runners-up; (gold) 1936 Copa Héctor Gómez – Champions; (bronze) 1937 South American Championship – Third Place; (silver) 1937 Copa Newton – Runners-up; (silver) 1937 Copa Lipton – Runners-up; (silver) 1938 Copa Juan Mignaburu – Runners-up; (silver) 1938 Copa Héctor Gómez – Runners-up; (silver) 1939 South American Championship – Runners-up; (gold) 1940 Taça Rio Branca – Champions; (gold) 1940 Copa Héctor Gómez – Champions; (silver) 1940 Copa Juan Mignaburu – Runners-up; (silver) 1941 South American Championship – Runners-up
