= Julio Borelli =

Uruguayan association football referee (1903–1990)

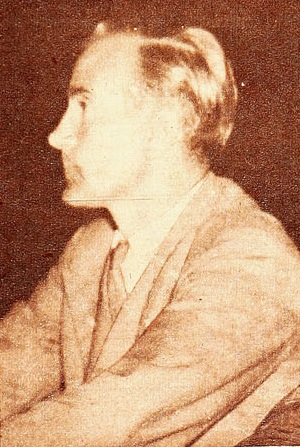
- Full name: Julio Borelli Viterito
- Born: 29 September 1908; Montevideo, Uruguay
- Died: 1 May 1990 (aged 86); La Paz, Bolivia
- Other occupation: Journalist, Football Coach, Sports Administrator

Domestic
Years	League	Role
1920s–1930s	Peruvian Football League	Referee
1930s–1940s	Bolivian Football Leagues	Referee / Coach

International
Years	League	Role
1929, 1945	CONMEBOL	Referee, Coach

Julio Borelli Viterito (born 29 September 1908 in Montevideo, Uruguay; died 1 May 1990 in La Paz, Bolivia) was a Uruguayan-born football referee, coach, and journalist who worked in Peru and Bolivia. He participated in the early development of football institutions in both countries and held positions as a referee, club coach, and sports administrator.

== Early life and career in Peru ==
Borelli studied architecture in Montevideo before moving to Peru in the 1920s. He became involved in football as both a referee and coach. In Peru, he was associated with Universitario de Deportes, a club founded in 1924, where he contributed in various capacities including technical and organizational roles. Club sources describe him as playing a key part in the institution's early development and refer to his broad range of responsibilities during that period.

== International refereeing and coaching ==
Borelli was active as both a coach and referee at the 1929 South American Championship in Argentina. According to the Rec. Sport. Soccer Statistics Foundation (RSSSF), he served as a referee for the match between Argentina and Paraguay, and also coached the Peru national football team during the same tournament. Bolivian football historical records note that he later coached the Bolivia national football team during the 1945 South American Championship.

== Work in Bolivia ==
After relocating to Bolivia in the 1930s, Borelli remained involved in sport, particularly in sports journalism and football administration. He contributed to the organization of leagues and is noted in Bolivian sports literature for his role in establishing training and regulatory practices for referees

In 1986, Borelli was featured in retrospective reporting as a long-serving sports figure with decades of experience in Bolivian sport.

== Honours and recognition ==
In recognition of his work in sports, Borelli received the Order of the Condor of the Andes, Bolivia's highest civilian honour, by Supreme Resolution No. 202639.

== Legacy ==
Borelli died in La Paz on 30 April 1990. A major indoor sports arena in La Paz, the Coliseo Cerrado Julio Borelli Viterito, is named in his honour.
