= Batalha (footballer) =

Brazilian footballer (born 1896)

Personal information
- Full name: José Lodi Batalha
- Date of birth: 28 April 1896
- Place of birth: Rio de Janeiro, Brazil
- Date of death: 27 October 1963 (aged 67)
- Place of death: Rio de Janeiro, Brazil
- Position: Goalkeeper

International career
Years	Team	Apps	(Gls)
1925	Brazil	2	(0)

José Lodi Batalha (born 28 April 1896 - death 27 October 1963), known as just Batalha, was a Brazilian footballer. He played in two matches for the Brazil national football team in 1925. He was also part of Brazil's squad for the 1925 South American Championship.
