= Carlos Moscoso =

Peruvian footballer (1902-1957)

Personal information
- Full name: Carlos Moscoso Torres
- Date of birth: 23 January 1902
- Place of birth: Lima, Peru
- Date of death: 13 January 1957 (aged 54)
- Place of death: Lima, Peru
- Position: Defender

Senior career*
Years	Team	Apps	(Gls)
- Unión Miraflores
- Ciclista Association

International career
1927	Peru	3	(0)
- * Club domestic league appearances and goals

Carlos Moscoso (23 January 1902 - 13 January 1957) was a Peruvian football defender who played for Peru in the 1927 South American Championship.
