= Manuel Seoane =

Argentine footballer

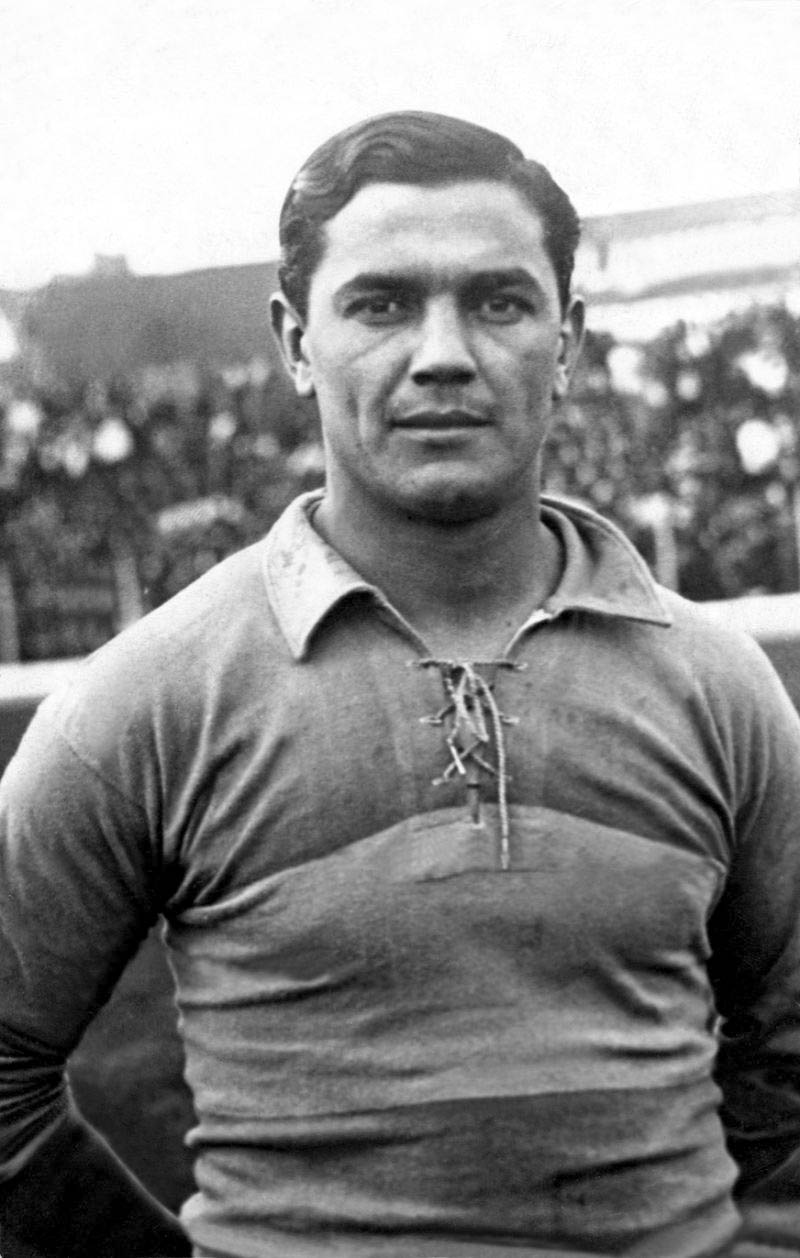
- Seoane during the 1925 Boca Juniors tour to Europe

Personal information
- Date of birth: 19 March 1902
- Place of birth: Piñeyro, Argentina
- Date of death: 21 August 1975 (aged 73)
- Place of death: Quilmes, Argentina
- Position: Striker

Youth career
- 1918–1920: Progresista (Note: It is unclear if the "Progresista" club were Seoane played was current Club Progresista or a different club with similar name.)
- 1920–1921: Independiente

Senior career*
Years	Team	Apps	(Gls)
1921–1923	Independiente	(total below)	
1923–1925	El Porvenir	?	(?)
1925	Boca Juniors	?	(16)
1926–1933	Independiente	264	(241)

International career
1924–1929	Argentina	19	(14)

Managerial career
- 1934–1937: Argentina
Medal record
Men's Football
Representing Argentina
Copa América
Winner	1925 Argentina	Team
Winner	1927 Peru	Team
Winner	1929 Argentina	Team
- * Club domestic league appearances and goals as of June 2012

Manuel Seoane (19 March 1902 – 21 August 1975), nicknamed La Chancha, was an Argentine footballer who played as a striker for Independiente and Argentina national team.

Seoane is considered one of the best all-time players for Independiente and one of the best of the 1920s decade. He gained recognition from the media and fans for being a strategist and a team player, as well as highly technical with the ball. He was also an implacable striker, being Independiente's 2nd all-time top scorer after Arsenio Erico and 4th. amongst all-time Primera División topscorers with 249 goals in 299 league matches.

He later went on to become the manager of the Argentina national team between 1935 and 1937.

== Playing career ==
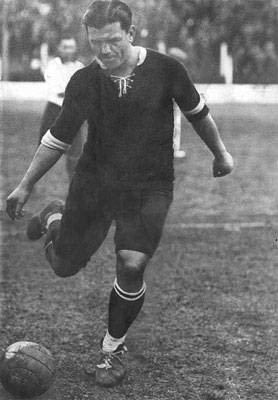
Seoane playing for Independiente, where he spent most of his career

He started playing at Club Progresista with 15 years old. After scoring two goals in a practice match, he joined Independiente, where he made his official debut on 6 March 1921 in a game against San Lorenzo. Seoane totalized two titles won with the institution that played at the Asociación Amateur de Football league.

Independiente won its first championship in 1922, with a great impact on the media which nicknamed the team "Los Diablos Rojos" ("The Red Devils"). The Devils has remained since as a trademark for Independiente players and supporters. That team was formed by notable players as Raimundo Orsi, Zoilo Canavery, Alberto Lalín, Luis Ravaschino and Seoane himself.

Seoane went on to score 241 goals for the club in 264 appearances. He finished as the Primera División top scorer on three occasions (1922, 1926 and 1929) during his career. He also won several titles with Independiente, including the Argentine championships of 1922 and 1926.

In 1923 he was sent off after an incident with a referee, this led to his suspension from the "Asociación Argentina de Football" league and his move to join El Porvenir, which played in the rival league "Asociación Amateurs de Football".

During his time with El Porvenir he made his debut for the Argentina national team, where he formed the forward line with Cesáreo Onzari. Seoane scored 3 goals in his debut with the national side, where he played a total of 19 matches scoring 14 goals between 1921 and 1929.

In 1925 Seoane joined Boca Juniors on its successful tour on Europe hitting 16 of the 40 goals converted by the team. He also played for Argentina in the 1925 South American Championship, being the topscorer of the tournament with 6 goals.

Once the punishment ended, he returned to Independiente in 1926, winning the title with the club that same year apart from being the topscorer with 76 goals.

He continued playing for Independiente until his retirement in 1933 due to his overweight problems. On 22 August 1934, the club organised a match in his honour and made a collection to buy him a house.

Seoane played for Argentina between 1924 and 1929, appearing in 4 Copa Américas (1924, 1925, 1927 & 1929). He was part of the winning team in 1925 1927 and 1929 and he was also the top scorer in 1925 with 6 goals.

== Managerial career ==
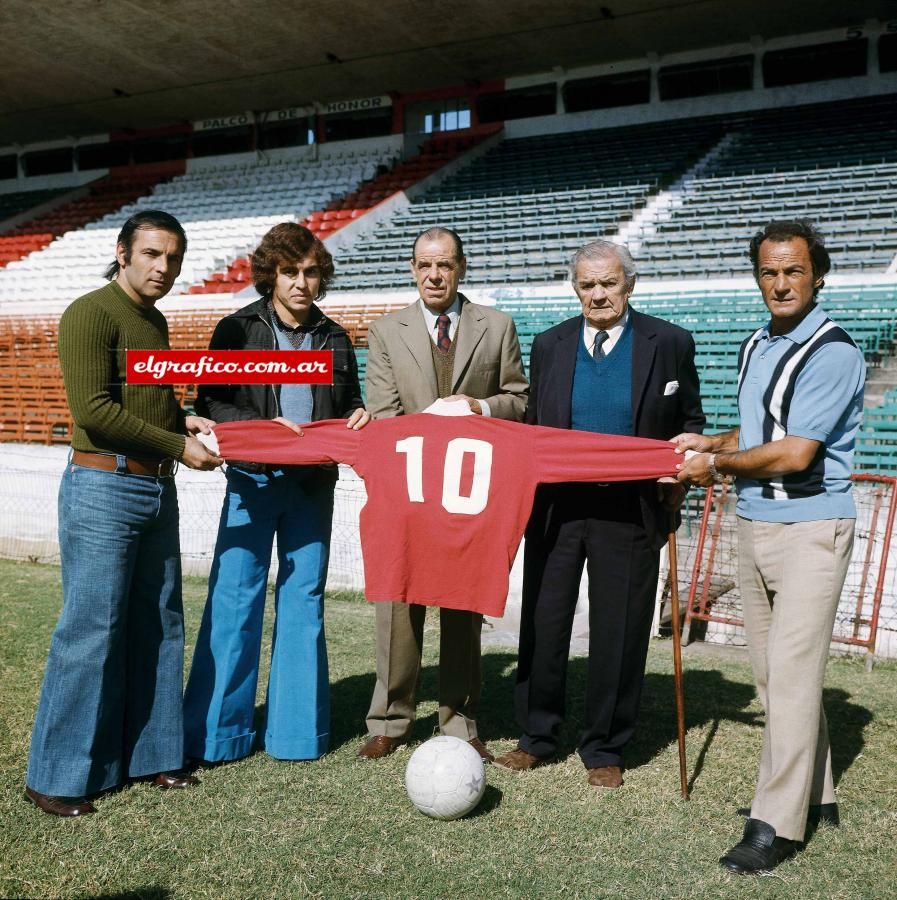
Seoane (second from right) in 1974 holding a #10 Independiente shirt among other notable playmakers of the club

Seoane went on to have a successful career as a football manager, he was manager of Argentina between 1934 and 1937.

== Later life ==
During his last years, Seoane was in charge of the Independiente's campground located in Quilmes, Buenos Aires, after retiring from the textile industry where he had worked.

Seoane died in Quilmes on 21 August 1975, aged 73.

== Honours ==
=== Club ===
Independiente

- Primera División: 1922 AAmF, 1926 AAmF

=== International ===
Argentina

- Copa América: 1925, 1927, 1929
