= Hélcio (footballer, born 1903) =

Brazilian footballer (born 1903)

Personal information
- Full name: Hélcio de Paiva
- Date of birth: 2 October 1903

International career
Years	Team	Apps	(Gls)
1925	Brazil	3	(0)

Hélcio de Paiva (born 2 October 1903, date of death unknown), known as just Hélcio, was a Brazilian footballer. He played in three matches for the Brazil national football team in 1925. He was also part of Brazil's squad for the 1925 South American Championship.
