= Conduelo Píriz =

Uruguayan footballer (1905–1976)

Personal information
- Full name: Conduelo Gisleno Píriz
- Date of birth: June 17, 1905
- Place of birth: Uruguay
- Date of death: December 25, 1976 (aged 71)
- Position: Midfielder

Senior career*
Years	Team	Apps	(Gls)
- Nacional

International career
1929–1932	Uruguay	6	(0)
Medal record
Men's football
Representing Uruguay
FIFA World Cup
Winner	1930 Uruguay
South American Championship
Third place	1929 Argentina
- * Club domestic league appearances and goals

Conduelo Gisleno Píriz (born in Montevideo, June 17, 1905 — December 25, 1976) was a Uruguayan footballer who played for the Uruguay national team. He was part of the squad which won the first ever World Cup in 1930, but he did not play any matches in the tournament. He was a club player of Nacional.
