= Pamplona (footballer) =

Brazilian footballer (1904–1973)

Personal information
- Full name: Estanislau de Figueiredo Pamplona
- Date of birth: 24 March 1904
- Place of birth: Belém, Brazil
- Date of death: 29 October 1973 (aged 69)
- Position: Midfielder

Senior career*
| Years | Team | Apps | (Gls) |
| 1922 | Remo | ? | (?) |
| 1923 | Fluminense | ? | (?) |
| 1924–1935 | Botafogo | ? | (?) |

International career
| 1925 | Brazil | 2 | (0) |
- * Club domestic league appearances and goals

Estanislau de Figueiredo Pamplona, best known as Pamplona (born in Belém, Pará State, 24 March 1904 – 29 October 1973) was a Brazilian footballer in offensive midfield role.

Pamplona played club football (1922–1935) for Remo, Fluminense and Botafogo. He won three Rio de Janeiro State Championship (in 1930, 1933, and 1934). For the Brazilian team, he was on roster for the 1930 FIFA World Cup but never played a game. He died at 69 years old.

== Honours ==
=== Club ===
- Campeonato Carioca (3):

Botafogo: 1930, 1933, 1934
