= Antonio Campolo =

Uruguayan football player (1897-1959)

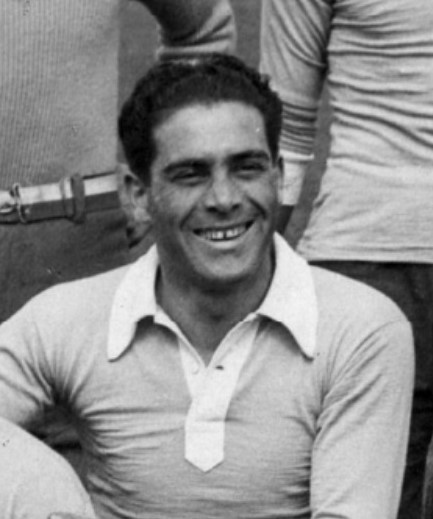
- Campolo in 1928

Personal information
- Date of birth: 7 February 1897
- Place of birth: Montevideo, Uruguay
- Date of death: 22 May 1959 (aged 62)
- Place of death: Montevideo, Uruguay
- Position: Left winger

Senior career*
Years	Team	Apps	(Gls)
1915 -1931	Peñarol		

International career
1918–1929	Uruguay	20	(3)
Medal record
Men's football
Representing Uruguay
Olympic Games
Gold medal – first place	1928 Amsterdam	Team
South American Championship
Winner	1920 Chile
Third place	1921 Argentina
Third place	1929 Argentina
- * Club domestic league appearances and goals

Antonio Campolo (born 7 February 1897 – 22 May 1959) was a Uruguayan footballer and Olympic gold medalist who played as a left winger for Peñarol and the Uruguay national team.

An Olympic gold medalist in 1928, Campolo had already been a champion with Uruguay in the 1920 South American Championship. He spent his club career at Peñarol, playing for the Carbonero between 1915 and 1931, and is, to this day, the player who won the most titles, both official and friendly, with the club. He won the Uruguayan club championship with Peñarol in 1918, ‘21, ‘28, and ‘29, the 1924 FUF Tournament, the 1926 Provisional Council Tournament, and the 1928 Aldao Cup.

== International career statistics ==
Team	Year	Apps	Goals
Uruguay	1918	2	0
Uruguay	1919	1	0
Uruguay	1920	6	1
Uruguay	1921	4	1
Uruguay	1922	1	0
Uruguay	1923	0	0
Uruguay	1924	0	0
Uruguay	1925	0	0
Uruguay	1926	0	0
Uruguay	1927	0	0
Uruguay	1928	3	1
Uruguay	1929	3	0
Total		20	3
