= Alfonso Saldarriaga =

Peruvian footballer (1902–1985)

Personal information
- Full name: Alfonso Enrique Saldarriaga de Osma
- Date of birth: 23 January 1902
- Place of birth: Callao, Peru
- Date of death: 8 March 1985 (aged 83)
- Position: Defender

Senior career*
Years	Team	Apps	(Gls)
1919–1926	Unión Buenos Aires		
1927–1928	Atlético Chalaco		
1929–1930	Hidroaviación		
1931–1935	Atlético Chalaco		
1936	Everton		

International career
1927–1929	Peru	6	(0)
- * Club domestic league appearances and goals

Alfonso Enrique Saldarriaga de Osma (23 January 1902 – 8 March 1985) was a Peruvian professional footballer who played as defender.

== Playing career ==
=== Club career ===
This elegant defender – nicknamed El Sereno (the serene) – began his career in 1919 with Unión Buenos Aires in his hometown of Callao. He made a name for himself in a friendly match on 7 September 1924, between a team made up of players from Unión Buenos Aires and Atlético Chalaco – sometimes called Combinado Chalaco – and Uruguay, scoring the winning goal from the penalty spot against the Uruguayans. This goal was significant as it represented the first victory for a Peruvian team over Uruguay, even before the existence of the Peruvian national football team.

He continued his career with other clubs in Callao, such as Atlético Chalaco and Hidroaviación. In 1936, he moved to Chile, joining Everton de Viña del Mar, a club that fielded up to ten Peruvian players in its first team.

=== International career ===
A Peruvian international from 1927 to 1929, Alfonso Saldarriaga earned six caps for the Peruvian national team (scoring no goals). He participated in the 1927 South American Championship, held in Lima, where he was part of Peru's first-ever squad, which lost 0–4 to Uruguay on 1 November 1927.

Two years later, he played in the 1929 South American Championship in Buenos Aires. Surprisingly, he was not selected to play in the inaugural World Cup in 1930 in Uruguay.
