= Juan Evaristo =

Argentine footballer (1902–1978)

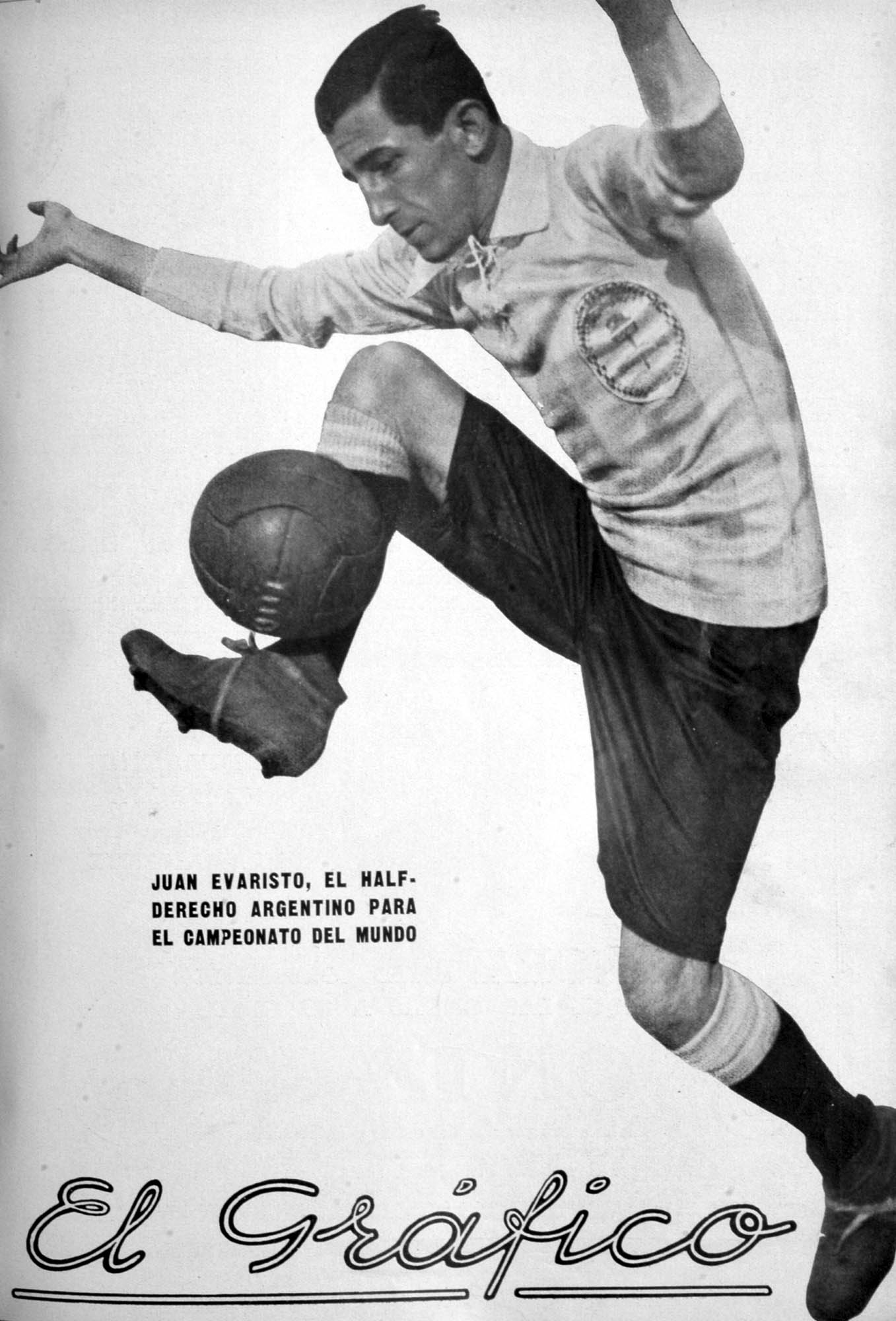
- Juan Evaristo from El Gráfico 573, in 1930

Personal information
- Full name: Juan Léon Evaristo
- Date of birth: 20 June 1902
- Place of birth: Buenos Aires, Argentina
- Date of death: 8 May 1978 (aged 75)
- Height: 1.70 m (5 ft 7 in)
- Position: Midfielder

Senior career*
Years	Team	Apps	(Gls)
1920–1929	Sportivo Palermo	213	(12)
1930	Sportivo Barracas		
1931–1932	Boca Juniors	24	(0)
1933	Independiente	2	(0)
1936	Argentinos Juniors	6	(0)
1937	Sportivo Barracas	1	(0)

International career
1923–1930	Argentina	26	(6)
Medal record
Men's Football
Representing Argentina
Copa América
Winner	1927 Peru	Team
Winner	1929 Argentina	Team
FIFA World Cup
Runner-up	1930 Uruguay	Team
Olympic Games
Silver medal – second place	1928 Amsterdam	Team
- * Club domestic league appearances and goals

Juan Evaristo (20 June 1902 – 8 May 1978) was an Argentine football wing half-back who played for Argentina between 1923 and 1930. Along with his younger brother Mario, an outside left, they became the first siblings to appear in a World Cup final.

== Club career ==
Evaristo played for Sportivo Palermo, Club Atlético Huracán and Sportivo Barracas during the amateur era of Argentine football. In 1931 he joined Boca Juniors helping them to win the first ever professional title in Argentine football. He left Boca for Club Atlético Independiente in 1932 and later played for Argentinos Juniors and Sportivo Barracas where he retired from football in 1937.

He and his brother Mario were in charge of Boca's youth academies for more than 30 years.

== International career ==
He was a member of the Argentine team, which won the silver medal in the Olympic football tournament. He participated in the first ever World Cup in 1930, where Argentina again finished second behind Uruguay.

Evaristo also played in two editions of Copa América, 1927 and 1929, both won by Argentina.

== Honours ==
=== Club ===
Boca Juniors

- Primera División Argentina: 1931

=== International ===
Argentina

- Copa América: 1927, 1929
- Summer Olympics Silver Medal: 1928
- FIFA World Cup runner-up: 1930
