= Ángel Bossio =

Argentine footballer

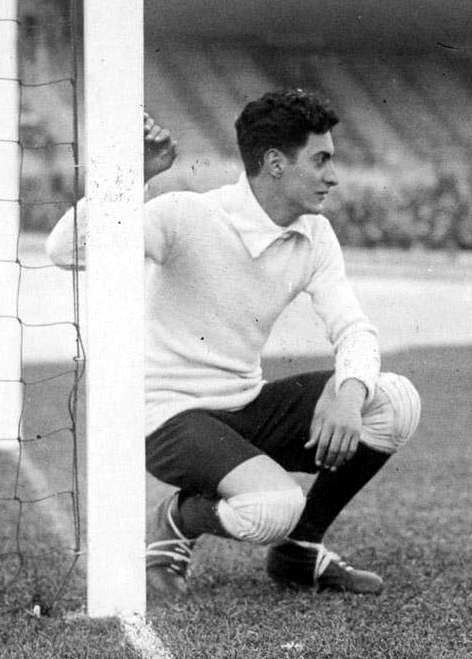
- Bossio at the 1928 Olympic games

Personal information
- Full name: Ángel Luis Bossio
- Date of birth: 5 May 1905
- Place of birth: Buenos Aires, Argentina
- Date of death: 31 August 1978 (aged 73)
- Place of death: Avellaneda, Argentina
- Height: 1.78 m (5 ft 10 in)
- Position: Goalkeeper

Senior career*
Years	Team	Apps	(Gls)
1927–32	Talleres		
1933–36	River Plate	106	
1937–38	Talleres		

International career
1927–1935	Argentina	21	(0)

Managerial career
- 1959: Talleres
Medal record
Men's Football
Representing Argentina
Copa América
Winner	1927 Peru	Team
Winner	1929 Argentina	Team
FIFA World Cup
Runner-up	1930 Uruguay	Team
Olympic Games
Silver medal – second place	1928 Amsterdam	Team
- * Club domestic league appearances and goals

Ángel Luis Bossio (5 May 1905 – 31 August 1978) was an Argentine football goalkeeper. He was called "La maravilla elástica" ("The elastic wonder") due to his agility. Bossio was a member of the Argentine team that took part of the 1928 Olympic games and won the silver medal.

He also participated in the first ever World Cup in 1930, where Argentina again finished second behind Uruguay. He played for Argentina 21 times between 1927 and 1935. At club level, Bossio played for Talleres de Remedios de Escalada in the 1920s before joining River Plate after the professionalisation of Argentine football in 1931. In 1959, he managed the first team of Talleres de Remedios de Escalada.

== Honours ==
River Plate

- Argentine Primera División: 1936 Copa Campeonato, 1936 Copa de Oro

Argentina

- Copa América: 1927, 1929
- Summer Olympics Silver Medal: 1928
- FIFA World Cup runner-up: 1930
