= Romildo Etcheverry =

Paraguayan footballer (1906–1967)

Personal information
- Full name: Romildo Jorge Etcheverry
- Date of birth: 15 December 1906
- Place of birth: Paraguay
- Date of death: 1967 (aged 60–61)
- Position: Midfielder
Total			(44)

International career
Years	Team	Apps	(Gls)
- Paraguay

Romildo Jorge Etcheverry (15 December 1906 – 1967) was a Paraguayan footballer that played either as a midfielder or defender. Etcheverry was part of the Paraguay national football team that participated in the 1930 FIFA World Cup. During most of his career he played for Club Rubio Ñu, Olimpia Asunción and later was transferred to Boca Juniors where he won the 1934 Argentine first division.

Etcheverry also excelled for the Paraguayan Army at the Chaco War, where he was an aviator.
