= Adolfo Zumelzú =

Argentine footballer (1902–1973)

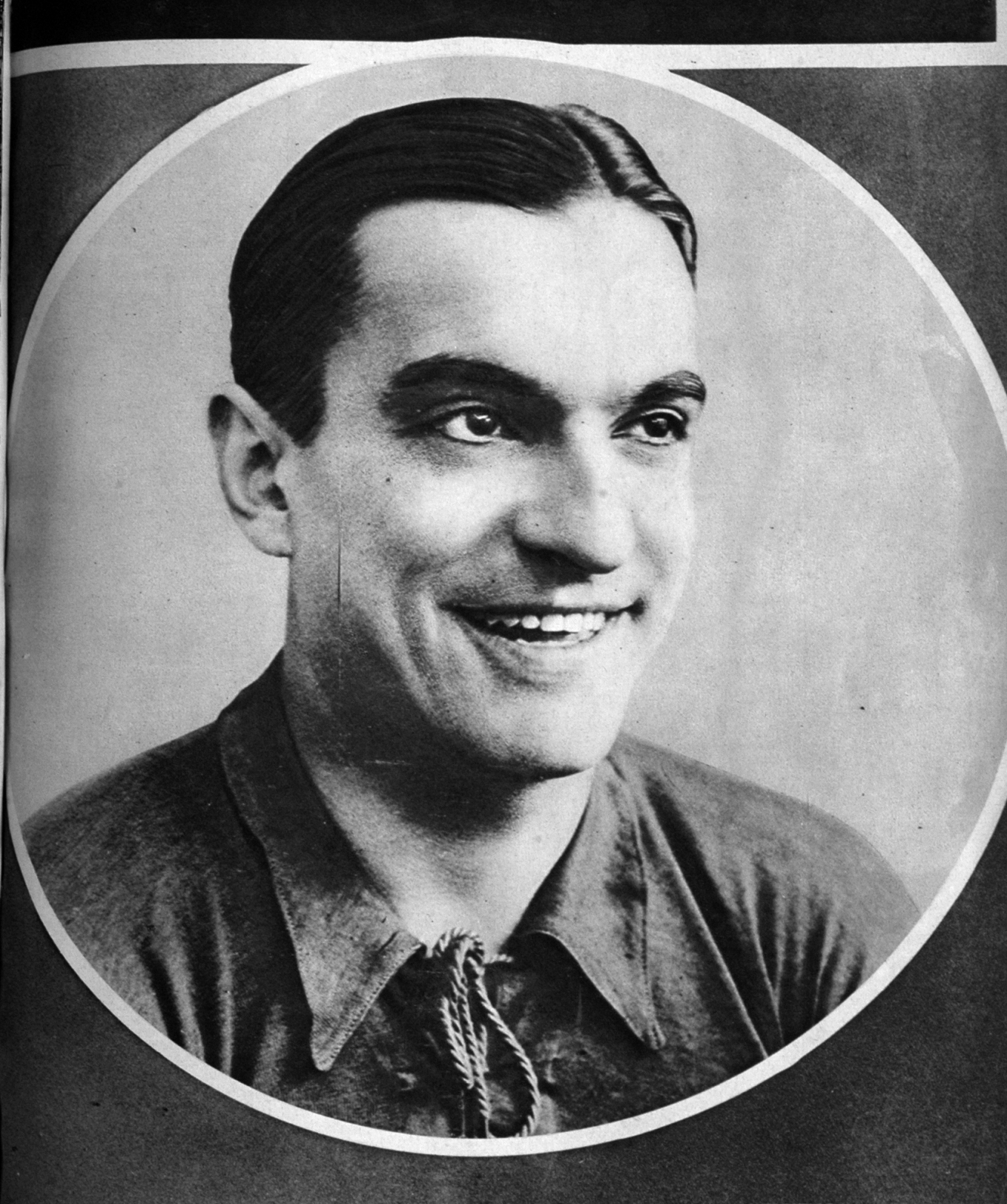
- Zumelzú in 1929

Personal information
- Full name: Adolfo Bernabé Zumelzú
- Date of birth: 5 January 1902
- Place of birth: Buenos Aires, Argentina
- Date of death: 29 March 1973 (aged 71)
- Place of death: Buenos Aires, Argentina
- Position: Half-back

Youth career
- San Isidro

Senior career*
Years	Team	Apps	(Gls)
- San Isidro
1925	Racing Club		
1930	Estudiantil Porteño		
1931	Tigre	7	(0)
- Sportivo Palermo

International career
1927–1930	Argentina	13	(4)
Medal record
Men's Football
Representing Argentina
Copa América
Winner	1927 Peru	Team
Winner	1929 Argentina	Team
FIFA World Cup
Runner-up	1930 Uruguay	Team
Olympic Games
Silver medal – second place	1928 Amsterdam	Team
- * Club domestic league appearances and goals

Adolfo Bernabé Zumelzú (5 January 1902 – 29 March 1973) was an Argentina footballer who played as a half-back.

== Club career ==
Zumelzú played club football for Tigre and Sportivo Palermo. He was a dominant right footed winger, but converted 13/17 penalties for Tigre with his left.

== International career ==
He represented the Argentina at the South American Championship 1927 and the South American Championship 1929 both won by Argentina.

He was part of the team sent to the 1928 Amsterdam Summer Olympics, but he did not play in any matches. Argentina lost the final against Uruguay.

Zumelzú also participated in the 1930 FIFA World Cup, where Argentina finished second behind Uruguay. He scored two goals in the tournament. He was unable to play in the World Cup final due to injury, severely impacting their performance.

== Career statistics ==
Scores and results list Argentina's goal tally first, score column indicates score after each Zumelzú goal.

List of international goals scored by Adolfo Zumelzú
No.	Date	Venue	Opponent	Score	Result	Competition
1	3 November 1929	Estadio Gasómetro, Buenos Aires, Argentina	Peru	2–0	3–0	1929 South American Championship
2	3 November 1929	Estadio Gasómetro, Buenos Aires, Argentina	Peru	3–0	3–0	1929 South American Championship
3	19 July 1930	Estadio Centenario, Montevideo, Uruguay	Mexico	2–0	6–3	1930 FIFA World Cup
4	19 July 1930	Estadio Centenario, Montevideo, Uruguay	Mexico	5–1	6–3	1930 FIFA World Cup

== Honours ==
Racing Club

- Argentine Primera División: 1925 AAmF

Argentina

- Copa América: 1927, 1929
- Summer Olympics silver medal: 1928
- FIFA World Cup runner-up: 1930
