= José Lago Millán =

Personal information
- Full name: José Lago Millán
- Date of birth: 1893
- Place of birth: Pontevedra, Spain

Managerial career
- Years: Team
- 1927–1928: Argentina
- 1932: Boca Juniors
- 1936–1937: Argentina (assistant)

José Lago Millán (born 1893, date of death unknown) was a Spanish football manager, who was notably the first foreign manager to coach the Argentine national team.

== Career ==
Born in Pontevedra, Spain, Lago Millán moved to Argentina at the age of 13. In 1927, he was appointed the manager of the Argentina national team, where he won the 1927 South American Championship, and help Argentina win a silver medal in football at the 1928 Summer Olympics in Amsterdam, before resigning shortly after the tournament.

In 1932, Lago Millán was briefly the manager of Boca Juniors, before later being appointed the assistant manager of Argentina under Manuel Seoane in 1936.

== Honours ==
Argentina

- Copa Newton: 1927, 1928
- South American Championship: 1927
- Silver medalist at the 1928 Summer Olympics
