= Mario Evaristo =

Argentine footballer (1908–1993)

- Evaristo in 1931

Personal information
- Full name: Marino Evaristo
- Date of birth: 10 December 1908
- Place of birth: Buenos Aires, Argentina
- Date of death: 30 April 1993 (age 84)
- Place of death: Quilmes, Argentina
- Height: 1.69 m (5 ft 6 1/2 in)
- Position: Outside left

Senior career*
Years	Team	Apps	(Gls)
–1926	Sportivo Palermo		
1926–1931	Boca Juniors	110	(31)
1932	Sportivo Barracas		
1932–1933	Independiente	13	(2)
1935–1936	Genoa		
1936–1938	Antibes		
1938–1939	Nice		

International career
1929–1930	Argentina	9	(2)
Medal record
Men's Football
Representing Argentina
Copa América
Winner	1929 Argentina	Team
FIFA World Cup
Runner-up	1930 Uruguay	Team
- * Club domestic league appearances and goals

Marino "Mario" Evaristo (10 December 1908 – 30 April 1993) was an Argentine footballer who played for the Argentina national football team. He was a member of the runner-up Argentine team in the 1930 FIFA World Cup and along with his elder brother Juan, a wing half-back, they became the first siblings to appear in a World Cup final.

Evaristo was christened Marino, but later changed his name to Mario. He played for Sportivo Palermo, Club Atlético Independiente and Boca Juniors in Argentina, he was part of the Boca team that won the Primera Division Argentina 1931 (the first professional champions of Argentina).

Later in his career he moved to Europe, where he played for Genoa C.F.C. in Italy, and for Nice and Antibes in France.

With his brother Juan, he was in charge of Boca's youth academies for more than 30 years.

== Honours ==
Club Atlético Boca Juniors

- Argentine Primera División: 1926, 1930, 1931
- Copa Estimulo: 1926

Sportivo Barracas

- AAAF amateur Championship: 1932

Argentina

- Copa América: 1929
- FIFA World Cup runner-up: 1930

== International goals ==
Argentina's goal tally first

#	Date	Venue	Opponent	Score	Result	Competition
1.	10 November 1929	Estadio Gasómetro, Buenos Aires, Argentina	Paraguay	1–0	4–1	1929 South American Championship
2.	22 July 1930	Estadio Centenario, Montevideo, Uruguay	Chile	3–1	3–1	1930 FIFA World Cup
