= José Fossa =

Argentine footballer

Josè Fossa
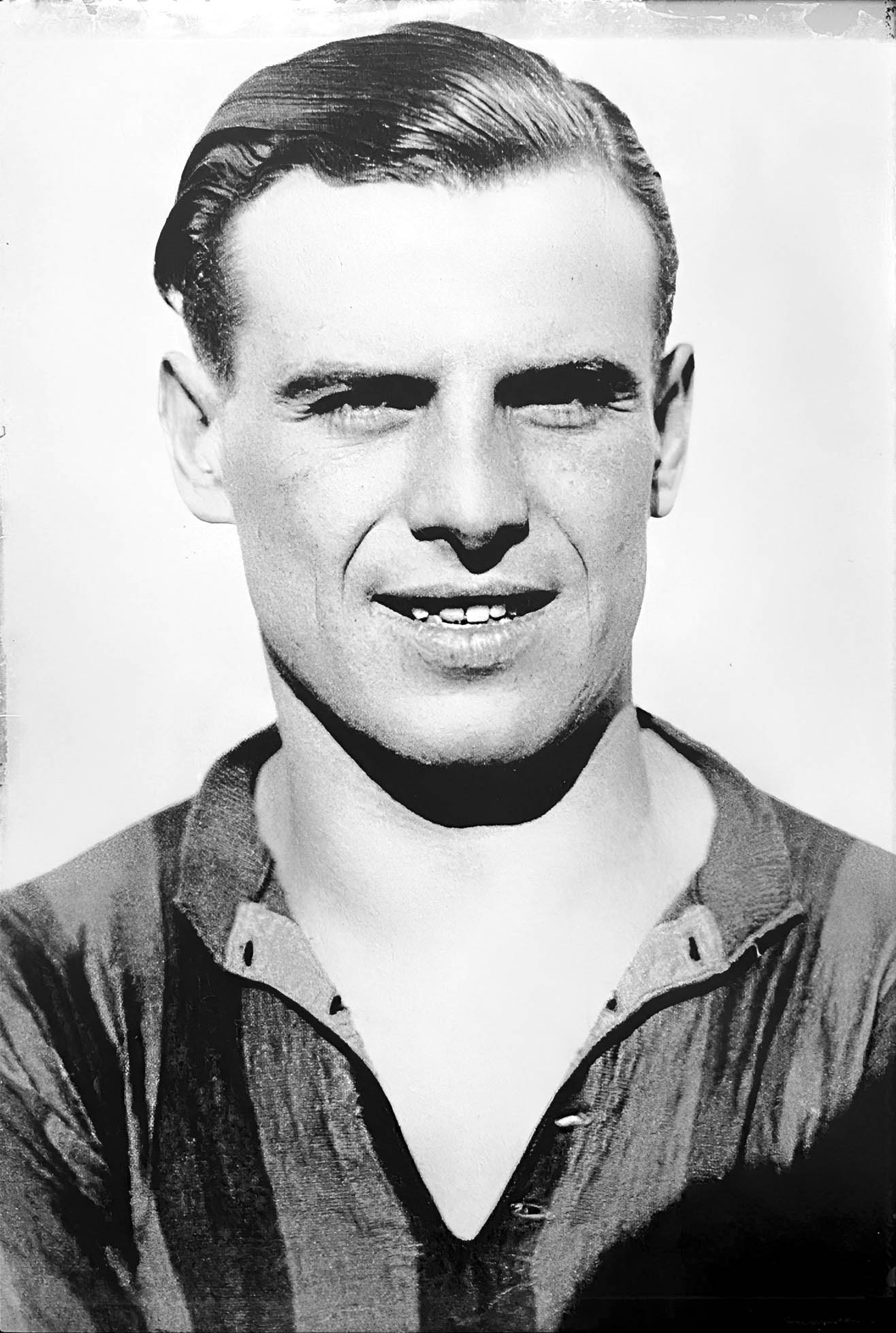

Personal information
- Date of birth: 1902
- Date of death: 9 October 1967 (aged 64–65)
- Position: Midfielder

International career
Years	Team	Apps	(Gls)
1927	Argentina	1	(0)

Josè Fossa (1902 – 9 October 1967) was an Argentine footballer. He played in one match for the Argentina national football team in 1927. He was also part of Argentina's squad for the 1927 South American Championship.
