= Alberto Cuello =

Argentine footballer

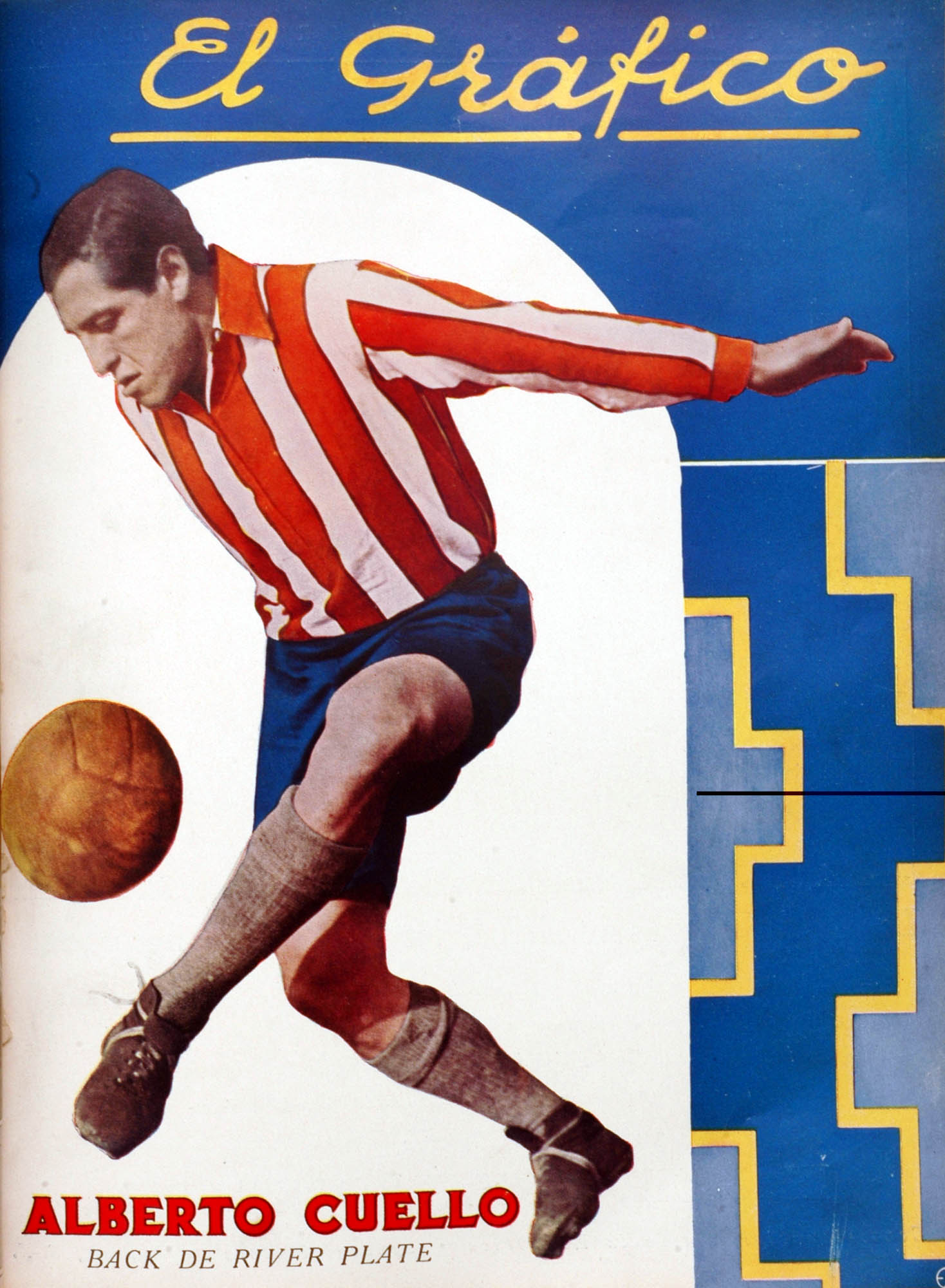

Personal information
- Date of birth: 23 September 1909
- Position: Defender

International career
Years	Team	Apps	(Gls)
1930–1937	Argentina	5	(0)

Alberto Cuello (born 23 September 1909, date of death unknown) was an Argentine footballer. He played in five matches for the Argentina national football team from 1930 to 1937. He was also part of Argentina's squad for the 1937 South American Championship.
