= Manuel Ferreira (footballer) =

Argentine footballer (1905–1983)

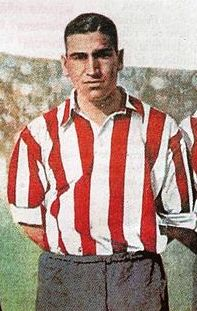
- Ferreira c. 1931

Personal information
- Full name: Manuel Ferreira
- Date of birth: 22 October 1905
- Place of birth: Trenque Lauquen, Argentina
- Date of death: 29 July 1983 (aged 77)
- Position: Striker

Youth career
- Argentino (Trenque Lauquen)

Senior career*
Years	Team	Apps	(Gls)
1924–1933	Estudiantes (LP)		
1933–1935	River Plate	35	(15)
1935–1936	Estudiantes (LP)		

International career
1927–1930	Argentina	21	(11)

Managerial career
- 1931: Estudiantes (LP) (co-manager)
- 1955: Estudiantes (LP)
Medal record
Men's Football
Representing Argentina
Copa América
Winner	1927 Peru	Team
Winner	1929 Argentina	Team
FIFA World Cup
Runner-up	1930 Uruguay	Team
Olympic Games
Silver medal – second place	1928 Amsterdam	Team
- * Club domestic league appearances and goals

Manuel Ferreira (22 October 1905 – 29 July 1983) was an Argentine footballer who played as a forward.

Throughout his career, Ferreira was a member of the Argentina national team, and was part of the Argentine squad that won the football silver medal at the 1928 Olympic tournament. He also captained the Argentine team at the 1930 FIFA World Cup finals, in which Argentina finished as runner-up.

Ferreira won the Copa América championship with Argentina in 1929 and also won the Copa Newton in 1927 and 1928.

== Career ==
Nicknamed Nolo or Piloto Olímpico, Ferreira started his career at Club Argentino of Trenque Lauquen, then moving to Estudiantes de La Plata where he was part of the attacking formation known as Los Profesores ("the professors") along with Alejandro Scopelli, Alberto Zozaya, Miguel Ángel Lauri, and Enrique Guaita. That team lasted from 1928 to 1933, and was widely recognised due to their skills with the ball and the accuracy of their passes. They scored 103 goals in 1931 for a total of 216 within two seasons. Also in 1933, Zozaya (33) and Scopelli (31) were the top scorers of the tournament, setting a record of two players of the same team being top scorers. The nickname professors was not only due to their knowledge of the game but for the fact that the players used to enter the pitch wearing blue blazers. Apart from that, all of them were cultured people (Ferreira, p.e., was a scrivener).

Ferreira played in Estudiantes from 1924 to 1933. He was then transferred to River Plate where he had a short tenure, returning to Estudiantes until 1936 when he retired from professional football. Ferreira scored 100 goals for Estudiantes, ranking among its 10 historical top scorers.

After his retirement, Ferreira resumed his career as scrivener, also working as sports commentator in several media including radio broadcasting and newspapers Clarín and La Plata's El Día. He was correspondent covering the FIFA World Cup, working with notable announcer Joaquín Carballo Serantes (mostly known as "Fioravanti") and former footballer Roberto Cherro. In 1955, he was coach of Estudiantes.

Ferreira died of cancer at 77 years old in a hospital in Barcelona. In 1991, a street in his hometown was named after him.

== Honours ==
Argentina

- Copa América: 1927, 1929
- Summer Olympics Silver Medal: 1928
- FIFA World Cup runner-up: 1930

=== Individual ===
- Best player at the South American Championship: 1929
- FIFA World Cup All-Star Team: 1930
