= Fernando Paternoster =

Argentine footballer and manager

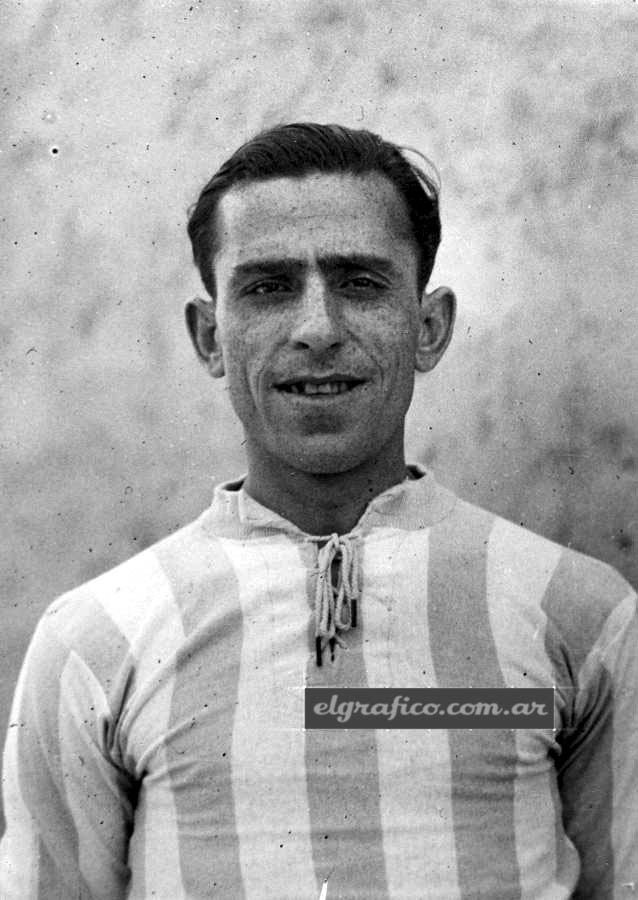
- Paternoster in 1928

Personal information
- Full name: Fernando Paternoster
- Date of birth: 24 May 1903
- Place of birth: Pehuajó, Argentina
- Date of death: 6 June 1967 (aged 64)
- Place of death: Buenos Aires, Argentina
- Position: Left back

Youth career
- 1919–1921: Atlanta

Senior career*
| Years | Team | Apps | (Gls) |
| 1921–1926 | Atlanta | ? | (?) |
| 1927–1932 | Racing Club | 27 | (0) |
| 1930 | → Vélez Sársfield (loan) | 0 | (0) |
| 1936 | Argentinos Juniors | 1 | (0) |

International career
| 1928–1930 | Argentina | 16 | (0) |

Managerial career
- 1938: Colombia
- 1948: América
- 1948–1951: Atlético Nacional
- 1954–1956: Atlético Nacional
- 1956–1957: Atlético Nacional
- 1962–1966: Emelec
Medal record
Men's Football
Representing Argentina
Copa América
| Winner | 1929 Argentina | Team |
FIFA World Cup
| Runner-up | 1930 Uruguay | Team |
Olympic Games
| Silver medal – second place | 1928 Amsterdam | Team |
- * Club domestic league appearances and goals

Fernando Paternoster (24 May 1903 – 6 June 1967) was an Argentine footballer and manager. He played for the Argentina national football team and helped promote football across South America in countries such as Colombia and Ecuador.

== Playing career ==
=== Club ===
Paternoster started his career in the youth team of Atlanta in 1919. He made his breakthrough into the first team in 1921.

In 1926 Paternoster joined Racing Club de Avellaneda where he played until 1932. Between 1930 and 1931, he was loaned for free by Racing to Vélez Sársfield to play for the club in a Pan-American tour that took them from Chile to the United States.

In 1936 he made a single appearance for Argentinos Juniors.

=== National team ===
Paternoster was part of the Argentina squad that finished runner-up to Uruguay in the 1928 Olympic football tournament. He played in the 1929 South American Championship, helping Argentina win the title. In 1930 he was again in an Argentine team that finished as runner up to Uruguay, this time in the 1930 FIFA World Cup. He made a total of 16 appearances for Argentina.

== Managerial career ==
Paternoster became the coach of Colombian team Club Municipal de Deportes in 1937. In 1938, he was selected to become manager of the Colombia national football team. He managed Deportivo Manizales in 1951. In 1954, he led Atlético Nacional to the Colombian league championship. In his later years, he worked to promote football in Ecuador, serving as manager of Emelec in the 1960s. He led the team to the national championship in 1965.

== Honours ==
=== Player ===
Racing

- Copa de Honor: 1932

Argentina

- Copa América: 1929
- Summer Olympics Silver Medal: 1928
- FIFA World Cup runner-up: 1930

=== Manager ===
Atlético Nacional

- Categoría Primera A (1): 1954

Emelec

- Campeonato Ecuatoriano de Futbol (1): 1965
