= Jorge Pardon =

Peruvian footballer (1905–1977)

Jorge Pardón
Personal information
- Full name: Jorge Ernesto Pardón García
- Date of birth: 4 March 1905
- Place of birth: Arequipa, Peru
- Date of death: 19 December 1977 (aged 72)
- Position: Goalkeeper

Senior career*
Years	Team	Apps	(Gls)
1927	Circolo Sportivo Italiano		
1928–1929	Atlético Chalaco		
1930–1934	Sporting Tabaco		

International career
- Peru
- * Club domestic league appearances and goals

Jorge Ernesto Pardón García (March 4, 1905 - December 19, 1977) was a Peruvian footballer who played for Peru at the 1930 FIFA World Cup. He also played for Sporting Cristal.
