= Lorenzo Fernández =

Uruguayan footballer (1900–1973)

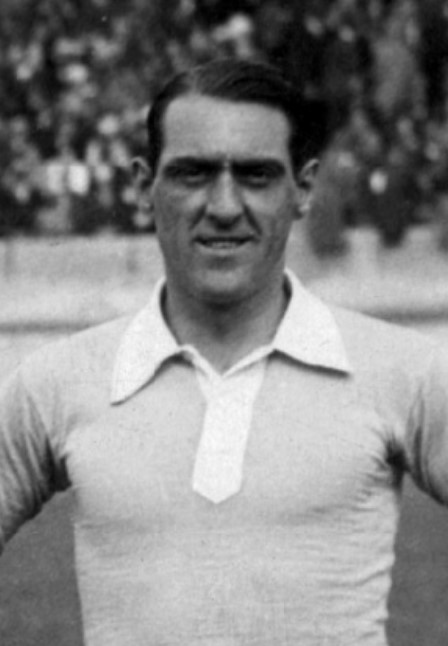
- Lorenzo Fernández in 1928

Personal information
- Date of birth: May 20, 1900
- Place of birth: Redondela, Spain
- Date of death: November 16, 1973 (aged 73)
- Place of death: Montevideo, Uruguay
- Position: Centre-half

Senior career*
Years	Team	Apps	(Gls)
1915–1917	C.A. Capurro		
1918	River Plate F.C.		
1919–1922	C.A. Capurro		
1923	Atlético Wanderers		
1924–1928	C.A. Capurro		
1928–1935	Peñarol	543	(31)

International career
1925–1935	Uruguay	31	(4)

Managerial career
- 1941–1942: Peñarol
- 1950: Liverpool
Medal record
Men's football
Representing Uruguay
Olympic Games
Gold medal – first place	1928 Amsterdam	Team
FIFA World Cup
Winner	1930 Uruguay
South American Championship
Winner	1926 Chile
Winner	1935 Peru
Runner-up	1927 Peru
Third place	1929 Argentina
- * Club domestic league appearances and goals

Lorenzo Fernández (May 20, 1900 – November 16, 1973), nicknamed El Gallego (The Galician), was a Spanish-born Uruguayan footballer. During his career, he played for Capurro, River Plate, Montevideo Wanderers FC and C.A. Peñarol. Fernández also played 31 times and scored 4 goals for the Uruguay national football team, with which he won the 1930 FIFA World Cup, the gold medal at the 1928 Summer Olympics, and the 1926 and 1935 Copa Americas. A center-half in the 2–3–5 footballing system, he once replaced Pedro Cea as an inside-left forward against Peru during a match in 1929 South American Championship and went on to score a hat-trick.

== Honours ==
- Atlético Wanderers
  - Federación Uruguaya: 1923
- Peñarol
  - Uruguayan Primera División: 1928, 1929, 1932 & 1935.
  - "La Tribuna Popular" Trophy: 1932
  - José Piendibene Cup: 1929
  - Mirurgia Cup: 1928
  - Ricardo Pittaluga Cup: 1928
  - Copa Aldao: 1928

=== International ===
- Uruguay
  - South American Championship: 1926 Winner, 1935 Winner
  - FIFA World Cup: 1930 Winner
  - 1928 Summer Olympics: 1928 Gold Medal
  - Copa Newton: 1929 & 1930 Winner
  - Copa Lipton: 1927 & 1929 Winner

=== Individual ===
- IFFHS Uruguayan Men's Dream Team (Team B)
