= Carlos Nascimento (footballer) =

Brazilian football manager (1904–1979)

Carlos de Oliveira Nascimento (3 January 1904 – 24 February 1979) was a Brazilian football player and manager who played as a midfielder. He coached the Brazil national team in 1939 for the Copa Roca. He was born and died in Rio de Janeiro.
