= Ramón Bucetta =

Uruguayan footballer

Personal information
- Date of birth: 13 September 1894
- Position: Defender

International career
Years	Team	Apps	(Gls)
1928	Uruguay	2	(0)

Ramón Bucetta (born 13 September 1894, date of death unknown) was a Uruguayan footballer. He played in two matches for the Uruguay national football team in 1928. He was also part of Uruguay's squad for the 1924 South American Championship.
