= Miguel Capuccini =

Uruguayan footballer (1904-1980)

Personal information
- Full name: Miguel Capuccini
- Date of birth: January 5, 1904
- Place of birth: Uruguay
- Date of death: June 9, 1980 (aged 76)
- Position: Goalkeeper

Senior career*
| Years | Team | Apps | (Gls) |
- Peñarol
- Montevideo Wanderers

International career
| 1927–1929 | Uruguay | 7 | (0) |
Medal record
Men's football
Representing Uruguay
FIFA World Cup
| Winner | 1930 Uruguay |
South American Championship
| Runner-up | 1927 Peru |
- * Club domestic league appearances and goals

Miguel Capuccini (January 5, 1904 in Montevideo – June 9, 1980) was a Uruguayan footballer. He was part of the team that won the first ever World Cup in 1930 for Uruguay but did not play any matches in the tournament.
