= Pedro Arispe =

Uruguayan footballer (1900–1960)

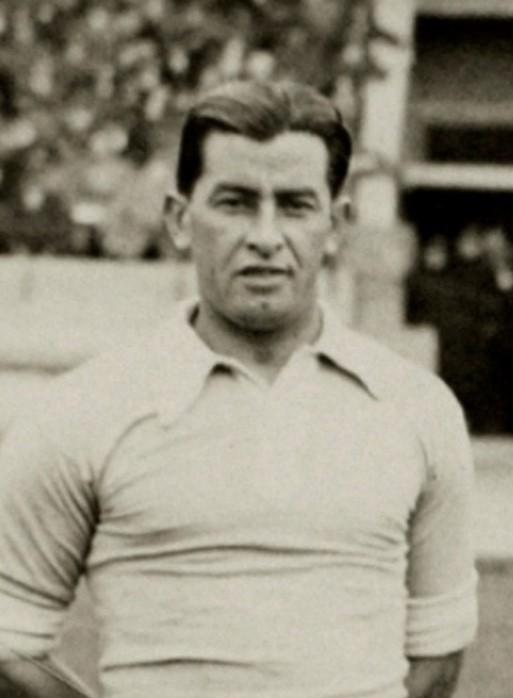
- Pedro Arispe in 1928

Personal information
- Date of birth: 30 September 1900
- Place of birth: Montevideo, Uruguay
- Date of death: 4 May 1960 (aged 59)
- Place of death: Montevideo, Uruguay
- Position: Defender

Senior career*
Years	Team	Apps	(Gls)
1919–1937	Rampla Juniors		

International career
1924–1929	Uruguay	19	(0)
Medal record
Men's football
Representing Uruguay
Olympic Games
Gold medal – first place	1924 Paris	Team
Gold medal – first place	1928 Amsterdam	Team
South American Championship
Winner	1924 Uruguay
Third place	1929 Argentina
- * Club domestic league appearances and goals

Pedro Arispe (30 September 1900 – 4 May 1960), nicknamed El Indio, was a Uruguayan footballer. He won a gold medal in the football tournaments at the 1924 Summer Olympics and the 1928 Summer Olympics.

== Career ==
He played in more than 300 matches in the Uruguayan First Division over the course of 17 seasons (1919–1937) for Rampla Juniors, winning the title in 1927 and a runner's-up spot in 1932. He also played for amateur teams Belgrano Oriental, Reformers and Albion del Cerro.

He was an assistant coach to Alberto Suppici during the 1930 FIFA World Cup.
