= Pedro Olivieri =

Uruguayan footballer (1892–?)

Personal information
- Full name: Pedro Olivieri Casaretto
- Date of birth: 20 March 1892
- Place of birth: Montevideo, Uruguay
- Position: Midfielder

Senior career*
Years	Team	Apps	(Gls)
1909	Belgrano		
1910–1912	Libertad		
1913	River Plate		
1914–1922	Nacional	216	(11)

International career
1916–1917	Uruguay	5	(0)

Managerial career
- 1922-1923: Uruguay
- 1926: Circolo Sportivo Italiano
- 1927–1928: Peru
- 1929: Hidroaviación
- 1935: Liberty F.C.
- 1937: Nacional
- 1938: Central
- * Club domestic league appearances and goals

Pedro Olivieri Casaretto (20 March 1892) was an Uruguayan footballer and football manager.

== Career ==
Born in Uruguay. He was a recognized player in his country in the 1920s. After his retirement, he worked as a coach for various clubs in his country and abroad. In addition, he was technical director of the Uruguay and Peru national teams. In 1937, he was a coach for Nacional.
