= Antonio Maquilón =

Peruvian footballer (1902-1984)

Personal information
- Full name: Antonio Maquilón Badaracco
- Date of birth: 29 November 1902
- Place of birth: Peru
- Date of death: 20 April 1984 (aged 81)
- Height: 1.72 m (5 ft 7 1/2 in)
- Position: Defender

Senior career*
Years	Team	Apps	(Gls)
- Sportivo Tarapacá Ferrocarril

International career
- Peru
- * Club domestic league appearances and goals

Antonio Maquilón Badaracco (29 November 1902 – 20 April 1984) was a Peruvian football defender who played for Peru in the 1930 FIFA World Cup. He also played for Sportivo Tarapacá Ferrocarril.
