= Diógenes Domínguez =

Paraguayan footballer

Personal information
- Date of birth: 1902
- Place of birth: Paraguay
- Position: Forward

Senior career*
Years	Team	Apps	(Gls)
- Club Sportivo Luqueño

International career
- Paraguay
- * Club domestic league appearances and goals

Diógenes Domínguez (born 1902, date of death unknown) was a Paraguayan football forward who played for Paraguay in the 1930 FIFA World Cup. He also played for Club Sportivo Luqueño. Domínguez is deceased.
