= José Leandro Andrade =

Uruguayan footballer (1901-1957)

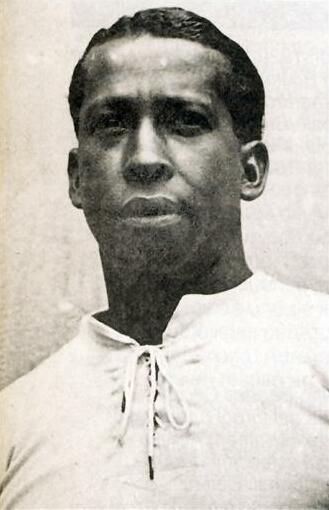
- José Andrade in 1926

Personal information
- Full name: José Leandro Andrade Quiroz
- Date of birth: 22 November 1901
- Place of birth: Salto, Uruguay
- Date of death: 5 October 1957 (aged 55)
- Place of death: Montevideo, Uruguay
- Height: 1.80 m (5 ft 11 in)
- Position: Defensive midfielder

Youth career
- Misiones

Senior career*
Years	Team	Apps	(Gls)
1921–1924	Bella Vista	71?	(7?)
1925–1930	Nacional	32	(2)
1931–1932	Peñarol	1	(0)
1933	Atlanta	1	(0)
1934	Talleres	2	(0)
1936	Wanderers	17?	(0)
Total		124	(9)

International career
1923–1930	Uruguay	33	(1)
Medal record
Men's football
Representing Uruguay
Olympic Games
Gold medal – first place	1924 Paris	Team
Gold medal – first place	1928 Amsterdam	Team
FIFA World Cup
Winner	1930 Uruguay
South American Championship
Winner	1923 Uruguay
Winner	1924 Uruguay
Winner	1926 Chile
Runner-up	1927 Peru
Third place	1929 Argentina
- * Club domestic league appearances and goals

José Leandro Andrade Quiroz (22 November 1901 – 5 October 1957) was a Uruguayan professional footballer who played as a wing-half. He was nicknamed "the Black Marvel" (maravilla negra). During his prime he was regarded as one of the finest players in the world, contributing to the Uruguay national team's domination of international football during the 1920s, winning two consecutive Olympic gold medals and then the inaugural FIFA World Cup he was the first black player to compete in both Olympic football and the World Cup.

== Early life ==
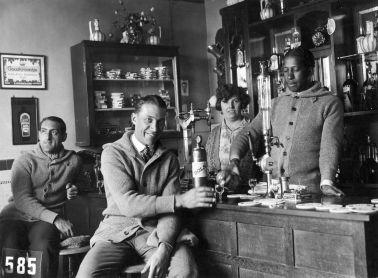
Andrade (behind the bar) serving a drink to his Uruguayan teammates in Amsterdam (1928)

Andrade was born in Salto in 1901 to an Argentine mother (Anastasia Quiroz, also spelled Vázquez). José Ignacio Andrade, who is believed to have been his father, was listed on his birth certificate as a witness. The older Andrade, who was 98 years old at the time of José Leandro Andrade's birth, had been an expert in African magic and is believed to have been an African-born slave who had escaped from Brazil.

At an early age Andrade moved to the Palermo barrio in Montevideo where he lived with an aunt.

Prior to the introduction of professional football in Uruguay he worked in a number of jobs. He at one time worked as a carnival musician playing the drums, violin and tambourine, and at another time led the drums corp for carnival comparsa Libertadores de Africa. At various times in his life he also worked as a shoeshiner and as a newspaper salesman.

== Playing career ==
=== Club career ===
As a teenager Andrade played for Montevideo club Misiones.

In the early 1920s Andrade was signed by Bella Vista, where he played 71 matches and scored seven goals. It was at Bella Vista that he was first selected for the national team.

Andrade later moved to Nacional where he won four Uruguayan Championships and three national cups.

Andrade transferred to Peñarol in 1930 where he played only 1 match over the next few years. He had trained with Peñarol as a teenager but had not been accepted.

He also had a brief stint with Wanderers in Uruguay.

=== International career ===
Andrade earned 34 appearances with la Celeste Olimpica scoring one goal between 1923 and 1930.

==== South American Championship ====
Andrade played in South American Championship (now known as Copa América) winning teams in 1923, 1924 and 1926.

==== 1924 Olympics ====
Andrade won his first Olympic gold medal at the 1924 Olympic football tournament in Paris. He was recognised as being the first black international football player to play Olympic football. He was nicknamed The Black Marvel and The Black Pearl, the latter a name later used in reference to Pelé.

In reaction to the 1924 Olympic win the Uruguayan team were challenged to a two match series by Argentina. In the second match at the Estadio Sportivo Barracas in Buenos Aires, Andrade was pelted with stones by the Argentine crowd to which Andrade and the rest of the Uruguayan team responded by throwing the stones back. In the ensuing riot a member of his team was arrested and the Uruguayans refused to play out the remainder of the match.

==== 1928 Olympics ====
In 1928 he won his second Olympic gold medal at the 1928 Olympics in Amsterdam. During the semi-final match against Italy Andrade collided with a goal post, seriously injuring an eye. This later deteriorated to the point that he became blind in that eye.

==== 1930 FIFA World Cup ====
Despite not being at his peak he managed to be one of Uruguay's best players as they won the 1930 World Cup. At the end of the tournament he was selected in the All-Star team. In 1994, he was selected by France Football as number ten in their World Cup Top-100.

A plaque was placed at the Estadio Centenario in honour of his achievements.

== Playing style ==
Andrade was praised for being an intelligent and humble player. His dynamic, fast and highly technical playing style helped him dominate the pitch without the physicality many of his teammates faced.

== Later life ==
After touring nine European countries with Andrade's Uruguayan club side Nacional, in 1925, they attracted a total of over 800,000 spectators. Andrade played half of that tour when he was told by a doctor in Brussels that he had contracted syphilis. He disappeared to Paris upon hearing the news. Andrade did not return to Montevideo until two months later; there a reporter said he had lost weight and seemed in a state of depression. He then underwent a course of treatment. Andrade had lost some pace but none of his skill and went on to secure international titles for Uruguay. It was said that he had gone blind in one eye after a semi-final against Italy, Andrade had run into a goalpost and it was speculated that the injury was so serious he was later blinded in one eye. Others said his blindness and deteriorated health was caused by syphilis.

Andrade was a guest at the 1950 FIFA World Cup when Uruguay won their second world championship. His nephew Víctor Rodríguez Andrade, a member of the 1950 team, had adopted Andrade as his second surname in honour of Andrade. In 1956, German journalist Fritz Hack searched Montevideo for Andrade for six days. He found him living in terrible conditions in a basement of a flat. Andrade was too intoxicated to understand Hack's questions. Within a year, Andrade died, penniless and alcoholic, in an asylum in Montevideo at age 55.

== Honours ==
=== Club ===
- Nacional
  - Primera División Uruguaya
    - Winner: 1924
    - Runner-up: 1929
  - Copa José Serrato
    - Winner: 1923
- Peñarol
  - Primera División Uruguaya
    - Winner: 1932, 1935
    - Runner-up: 1933, 1934

=== International ===
- Uruguay
  - Olympic Games
    - Gold medal: 1924, 1928
  - FIFA World Cup
    - Winner: 1930
  - South American Championship
    - Winner: 1923, 1924, 1926
    - Runner-up: 1927

=== Individual ===
- IFFHS Football Player of the Century: 29th
- South American Championship: Best Player 1926
- FIFA World Cup: Bronze Ball 1930
- FIFA World Cup: All-Star Team 1930
- International Football Hall of Champions: Inducted in 2001
- France Football's World Cup Top-100 1930–1990: 10th
- IFFHS Uruguayan Men's Dream Team
