= 1929 South American Championship =

Football tournament

Tournament details
- Host country: Argentina
- Dates: 1–17 November
- Teams: 4 (from 1 confederation)
- Venues: 3 (in 2 host cities)

Final positions
- Champions: Argentina (4th title)
- Runners-up: Paraguay
- Third place: Uruguay
- Fourth place: Peru

Tournament statistics
- Matches played: 6
- Goals scored: 23 (3.83 per match)
- Top scorer(s): (Paraguay) Aurelio González (5 goals)

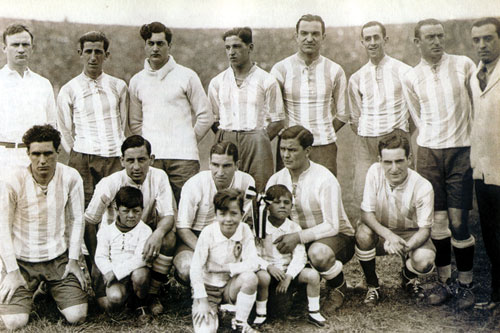
The Argentine team, winner of the tournament

The twelfth edition of the South American Championship was held in Buenos Aires, Argentina from 1 to 17 November 1929. The 1928 edition was postponed due to the participation of Chile, Uruguay and Argentina in the 1928 Summer Olympics held in Amsterdam, Netherlands, where Uruguay and Argentina won gold and silver respectively.

The participating countries were Argentina, Paraguay, Peru, and Uruguay, while Brazil, Bolivia, and Chile withdrew from the tournament.

Argentina won its fourth continental title.

== Squads ==
For a complete list of participants squads see: 1929 South American Championship squads

== Venues ==
Buenos Aires		Avellaneda
Estadio Gasómetro	Estadio Alvear y Tagle	Estadio Independiente
Capacity: 75,000	Capacity: 40,000	Capacity: 57,858

== Final round ==
Each team plays a single match against each of the other teams. Two points are awarded for a win, one point for a draw and zero points for a defeat.

Team	Pld	W	D	L	GF	GA	GD	Pts
Argentina	3	3	0	0	9	1	+8	6
Paraguay	3	2	0	1	9	4	+5	4
Uruguay	3	1	0	2	4	6	−2	2
Peru	3	0	0	3	1	12	−11	0

1 November 1929

Uruguay	0–3	Paraguay
		González 16', 86'; Domínguez 55'

Estadio Alvear y Tagle, Buenos Aires
Referee: José Galli (Argentina)

3 November 1929

Argentina	3–0	Peru
Peucelle 6'; Zumelzú 38', 58'

Estadio Gasómetro, Buenos Aires
Referee: Aníbal Tejada (Uruguay)

10 November 1929

Argentina	4–1	Paraguay
M. Evaristo 7'; Ferreira 24', 48'; Cherro 50'		Domínguez 56'

Estadio Gasómetro, Buenos Aires
Referee: Julio Borelli (Peru)

11 November 1929

Peru	1–4	Uruguay
Lizarbe 81'		Fernández 21', 29', 43'; Andrade 69'

Estadio Alvear y Tagle, Buenos Aires
Referee: Miguel Barba (Paraguay)

16 November 1929

Paraguay	5–0	Peru
Nessi 10'; González 55', 63', 69'; Domínguez 82'

Estadio Independiente, Avellaneda
Referee: José Galli (Argentina)

17 November 1929

Argentina	2–0	Uruguay
Ferreira 14'; M. Evaristo 77'	Report

Estadio Gasómetro, Buenos Aires
Attendance: 60,000
Referee: Miguel Barba (Paraguay)

Argentina	Uruguay

GK	Ángel Bossio
RB	Oscar Tarrío
LB	Fernando Paternoster
RH	Juan Evaristo
CH	Adolfo Zumelzú
LH	Alberto Chividini
OR	Carlos Peucelle
IR	Juan A. Rivarola
CF	Manuel Ferreira (c)
IL	Roberto Cherro
OL	Mario Evaristo
Manager:
(Argentina) Francisco Olazar

GK	Andrés Mazali
RB	José Nasazzi (c)
LB	Pedro Arispe
RH	Gildeón Silva
CH	Lorenzo Fernández
LH	Álvaro Gestido
OR	Conduelo Píriz
IR	Héctor Scarone
CF	Héctor Castro
IL	Pedro Cea
OL	Antonio Campolo
Manager:
(Uruguay) Alberto Suppici

Linesmen:

== Result ==
1929 South American Championship champions

Argentina
Fourth title

== Goal scorers ==
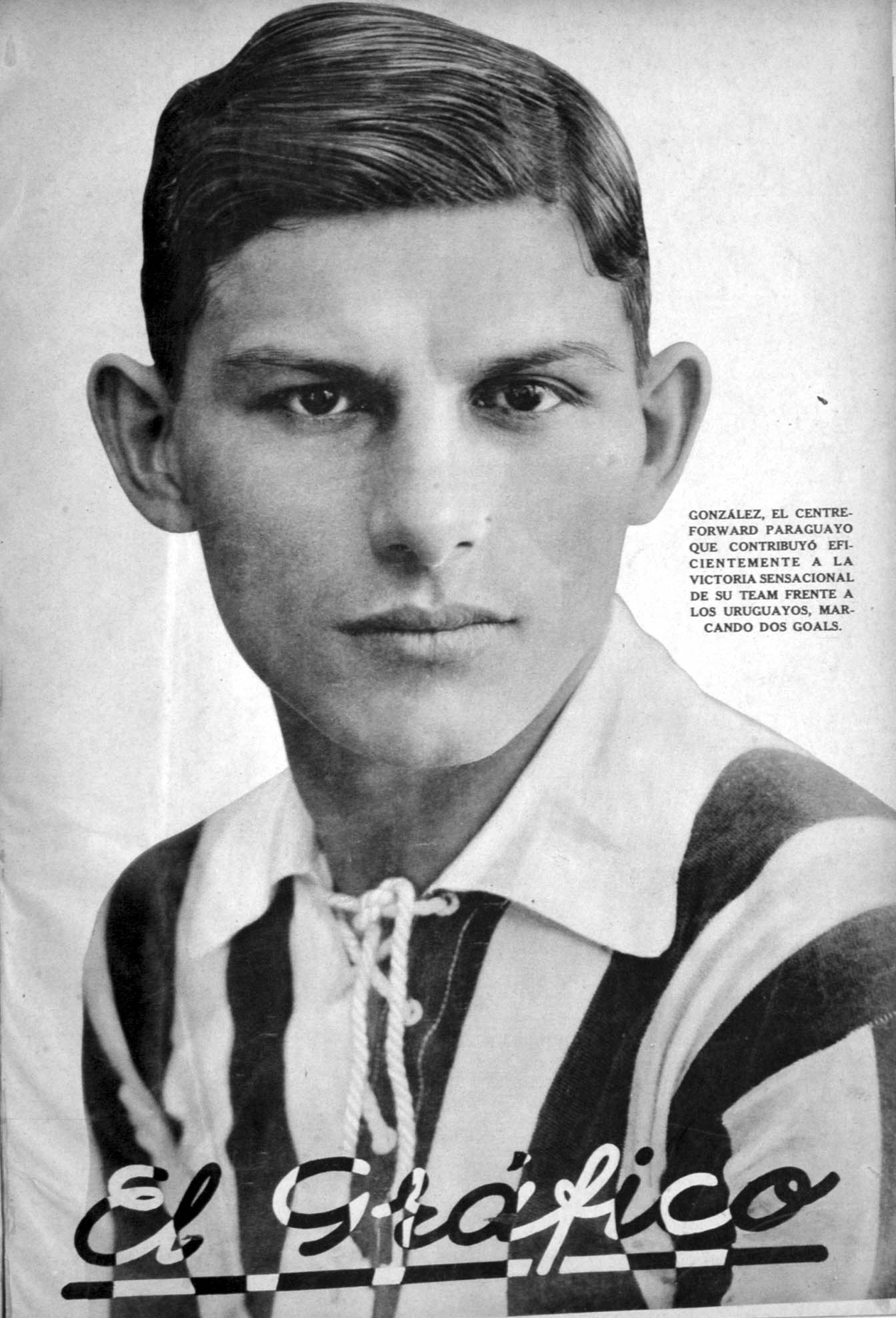
Aurelio González, top scorer

5 goals

- (Paraguay) Aurelio González

3 goals

- (Argentina) Manuel Ferreira
- (Paraguay) Diógenes Domínguez
- (Uruguay) Lorenzo Fernández

2 goals

- (Argentina) Mario Evaristo
- (Argentina) Adolfo Zumelzú

1 goal

- (Argentina) Roberto Cherro
- (Argentina) Carlos Peucelle
- (Paraguay) Nessi
- (Peru) Agustín Lizarbe
- (Uruguay) Juan Andrade
