= List of Mexico national football team hat-tricks =

This page is a list of the hat-tricks scored for the Mexico national football team. Since Mexico's first international association football match in 1923 against Guatemala, there have been 43 hat-tricks recorded. The first hat-trick was scored by Dionisio Mejía against Cuba in 1934. The most goals scored by a single player in a match is seven, achieved by Luís Roberto Alves against Martinique at the 1993 CONCACAF Gold Cup.

The record for most hat-tricks scored by a Mexican player is two, with the record being jointly held by five different players: Dionisio Mejía, Hilario López, Carlos Hermosillo, Jared Borgetti and Oribe Peralta. The most hat-tricks scored in a single game is three, with Marcelino Bernal, Carlos Hermosillo and Francisco Uribe all scoring hat-tricks against Saint Vincent and the Grenadines in 1994 FIFA World Cup qualification.

Mexico have conceded fourteen hat-tricks in total, with both Argentina and Chile both scoring two. One of Argentina's hat-tricks was notably scored by Guillermo Stábile at the 1930 FIFA World Cup, becoming the second hat-trick scored at the FIFA World Cup.

== Hat-tricks scored by Mexico ==
Scores and results list Mexico's goal tally first

| No. | Player | Date | Opponent | Venue | Goals | Result | Competition | Ref. |
|---|---|---|---|---|---|---|---|---|
| 1 | Dionisio Mejía | 4 March 1934 | Cuba | Parque Necaxa, Mexico City, Mexico | 3 – (12', 14', 16') | 3–2 | 1934 FIFA World Cup qualification | |
| 2 | Dionisio Mejía (2) | 11 March 1934 | Cuba | Parque Necaxa, Mexico City, Mexico | 3 – (31', 40', 79') | 5–0 | 1934 FIFA World Cup qualification | |
| 3 | Hilario López | 27 March 1935 | El Salvador | Estadio Nacional Flor Blanca, San Salvador, El Salvador | 3 – (73', 80', 86') | 8–1 | 1935 Central American and Caribbean Games | |
| 4 | Julio Lores | 30 March 1935 | Cuba | Estadio Nacional Flor Blanca, San Salvador, El Salvador | 4 – (3', 44', 53', 76') | 6–1 | 1935 Central American and Caribbean Games | |
| 5 | Hilario López (2) | 1 April 1935 | Honduras | Estadio Nacional Flor Blanca, San Salvador, El Salvador | 4 – (15', 26', 55', 80') | 8–2 | 1935 Central American and Caribbean Games | |
| 6 | Manuel Alonso | 19 September 1937 | United States | Parque Necaxa, Mexico City, Mexico | 3 – (38', 54', 66') | 7–3 | Friendly | |
| 7 | Adalberto López | 13 July 1947 | United States | La Tropical, Havana, Cuba | 3 – (3', 35', 85') | 5–0 | 1947 NAFC Championship | |
| 8 | Luis de la Fuente | 4 September 1949 | United States | Estadio Olímpico de la Ciudad de los Deportes, Mexico City, Mexico | 3 – (37', 55', 58') | 6–0 | 1949 NAFC Championship | |
| 9 | Horacio Casarín | 18 September 1949 | United States | Estadio Olímpico de la Ciudad de los Deportes, Mexico City, Mexico | 3 – (23', 41', 76') | 6–2 | 1949 NAFC Championship | |
| 10 | Carlos Septién | 10 April 1952 | Panama | Estadio Nacional, Santiago, Chile | 3 – (18', 34', 81' pen.) | 4–2 | 1952 Panamerican Championship | |
| 11 | Tomás Balcázar | 19 July 1953 | Haiti | Estadio Olímpico de la Ciudad de los Deportes, Mexico City, Mexico | 3 – (23', 26', 76') | 8–0 | 1954 FIFA World Cup qualification | |
| 12 | Pedro Arnauda | 19 July 1953 | Haiti | Estadio Olímpico de la Ciudad de los Deportes, Mexico City, Mexico | 3 – (38', 69', 85') | 8–0 | 1954 FIFA World Cup qualification | |
| 13 | Salvador Reyes | 7 April 1957 | United States | Estadio Olímpico Universitario, Mexico City, Mexico | 3 – (35', 70', 78') | 6–0 | 1958 FIFA World Cup qualification | |
| 14 | Alfredo Hernández | 28 April 1957 | United States | Veterans Memorial Stadium, Long Beach, United States | 3 – (22', 36', 82') | 7–2 | 1958 FIFA World Cup qualification | |
| 15 | Héctor Hernández | 1 March 1959 | Costa Rica | Estadio Olímpico Universitario, Mexico City, Mexico | 3 – (4', 16', 58') | 3–1 | Friendly | |
| 16 | Francisco Flores | 5 April 1961 | Netherlands Antilles | Estadio Olímpico Universitario, Mexico City, Mexico | 3 – (28', 52', 64') | 7–0 | 1962 FIFA World Cup qualification | |
| 17 | Ernesto Cisneros | 1 April 1965 | Netherlands Antilles | Estadio Nacional Mateo Flores, Guatemala City, Guatemala | 3 – (71', 86', 89') | 5–0 | 1965 CONCACAF Championship | |
| 18 | Isidoro Díaz | 7 May 1965 | Jamaica | Estadio Olímpico Universitario, Mexico City, Mexico | 3 – (32', 41', 90') | 8–0 | 1966 FIFA World Cup qualification | |
| 19 | Javier Fragoso | 24 April 1966 | Paraguay | Estadio Olímpico Universitario, Mexico City, Mexico | 3 – (16', 25', 82') | 7–0 | Friendly | |
| 20 | Raúl Arellano | 6 March 1967 | Nicaragua | Estadio Nacional, Tegucigalpa, Honduras | 3 – (36', 43', 53') | 4–0 | 1967 CONCACAF Championship | |
| 21 | Enrique Borja | 12 October 1972 | Costa Rica | Estadio Azteca, Mexico City, Mexico | 3 – (42', 45', 89') | 3–1 | Friendly | |
| 22 | Octavio Muciño | 8 December 1973 | Netherlands Antilles | Stade Sylvio Cator, Port-au-Prince, Haiti | 4 – (32', 45', 48', 82') | 8–0 | 1973 CONCACAF Championship | |
| 23 | Víctor Rangel | 9 October 1977 | Haiti | Estadio Azteca, Mexico City, Mexico | 3 – (46', 65', 82') | 4–1 | 1967 CONCACAF Championship | |
| 24 | Hugo Sánchez | 14 February 1978 | El Salvador | Cuscatlán Stadium, San Salvador, El Salvador | 3 – (15', 27', 60') | 5–1 | Friendly | |
| 25 (Note: Not recognised as an official match by FIFA) | Luis Flores | 29 November 1983 | Martinique | Fort-de-France, Martinique | 4 | 4–4 | Friendly | |
| 26 | Ricardo Peláez | 10 August 1989 | South Korea | Los Angeles Memorial Coliseum, Los Angeles, United States | 4 – (13', 37', 46') | 4–2 | Friendly | |
| 27 | Marcelino Bernal | 6 December 1992 | Saint Vincent and the Grenadines | Estadio Azteca, Mexico City, Mexico | 3 – (30', 52', 68') | 11–0 | 1994 FIFA World Cup qualification | |
| 28 | Carlos Hermosillo | 6 December 1992 | Saint Vincent and the Grenadines | Estadio Azteca, Mexico City, Mexico | 4 – (13', 41', 77', 79') | 11–0 | 1994 FIFA World Cup qualification | |
| 29 | Francisco Uribe | 6 December 1992 | Saint Vincent and the Grenadines | Estadio Azteca, Mexico City, Mexico | 3 – (3', 37', 88') | 11–0 | 1994 FIFA World Cup qualification | |
| 30 | Luís Roberto Alves | 11 July 1993 | Martinique | Estadio Azteca, Mexico City, Mexico | 7 – (10', 21', 40', 52', 81', 84', 90') | 9–0 | 1993 CONCACAF Gold Cup | |
| 31 | Luis Miguel Salvador | 22 July 1993 | Jamaica | Estadio Azteca, Mexico City, Mexico | 3 – (9', 18', 34') | 6–1 | 1993 CONCACAF Gold Cup | |
| 32 | Carlos Hermosillo (2) | 13 April 1997 | Jamaica | Estadio Azteca, Mexico City, Mexico | 3 – (18', 39', 47') | 6–0 | 1998 FIFA World Cup qualification | |
| 33 | Luis Hernández | 9 May 1998 | Estonia | Stadio Enzo Mazotti, Montecatini Terme, Italy | 3 – (9', 52', 76') | 6–0 | Friendly | |
| 34 | Cuauhtémoc Blanco | 25 July 1999 | Saudi Arabia | Estadio Azteca, Mexico City, Mexico | 4 – (12', 19', 68', 77') | 5–1 | 1999 FIFA Confederations Cup | |
| 35 | Jared Borgetti | 8 October 2000 | Trinidad and Tobago | Estadio Azteca, Mexico City, Mexico | 3 – (26', 30', 71') | 7–0 | 2002 FIFA World Cup qualification | |
| 36 | Jared Borgetti (2) | 6 October 2004 | Saint Vincent and the Grenadines | Estadio Hidalgo, Pachuca, Mexico | 4 – (31', 68', 77', 89') | 7–0 | 2006 FIFA World Cup qualification | |
| 37 | Luis Ernesto Pérez | 17 November 2004 | Saint Kitts and Nevis | Estadio Tecnológico, Monterrey, Mexico | 3 – (21', 49', 78') | 8–0 | 2006 FIFA World Cup qualification | |
| 38 | Francisco Fonseca | 8 October 2005 | Guatemala | Estadio Libertad Financiera, San Luis Potosí, Mexico | 4 – (48', 51', 62', 66') | 5–2 | 2006 FIFA World Cup qualification | |
| 39 | Javier Hernández | 5 June 2011 | El Salvador | Cowboys Stadium, Arlington, United States | 3 – (59', 67', 93' pen.) | 5–0 | 2011 CONCACAF Gold Cup | |
| 40 | Oribe Peralta | 19 November 2013 | New Zealand | Westpac Stadium, Wellington, New Zealand | 3 – (14', 29', 33') | 4–2 | 2014 FIFA World Cup qualification | |
| 41 | Alan Pulido | 29 January 2014 | South Korea | Alamodome, San Antonio, United States | 3 – (46', 86', 89') | 4–0 | Friendly | |
| 42 | Oribe Peralta (2) | 9 July 2015 | Cuba | Soldier Field, Chicago, United States | 3 – (17', 37', 62') | 6–0 | 2015 CONCACAF Gold Cup | |
| 43 | Uriel Antuna | 15 June 2019 | Cuba | Rose Bowl, Pasadena, United States | 3 – (2', 44', 80') | 7–0 | 2019 CONCACAF Gold Cup | |

== Hat-tricks conceded by Mexico ==
Scores and results list Mexico's goal tally first

| No. | Player | Date | Opponent | Venue | Goals | Result | Competition | Ref. |
|---|---|---|---|---|---|---|---|---|
| 1 | José Maria Yermo | 30 May 1928 | Spain | Het Nederlandsch Sportpark, Amsterdam, Netherlands | 3 – (43', 63', 85') | 1–7 | 1928 Summer Olympics | |
| 2 | Guillermo Subiabre | 5 June 1928 | Chile | Monnikenhuize, Arnhem, Netherlands | 3 – (24', 48', 89') | 1–3 | 1928 Summer Olympics | |
| 3 | Guillermo Stábile | 19 July 1930 | Argentina | Estadio Centenario, Montevideo, Uruguay | 3 – (8', 17', 80') | 3–6 | 1930 FIFA World Cup | |
| 4 | Aldo Donelli | 24 May 1934 | United States | Stadio Nazionale, Rome, Italy | 4 – (18', 30', 74', 86') | 2–4 | 1934 FIFA World Cup qualification | |
| 5 | Bobby Charlton | 10 May 1961 | England | Wembley Stadium, London, England | 3 – (12', 62', 73') | 8–0 | Friendly | |
| 6 | Enrique Casaretto | 20 October 1968 | Peru | Estadio Nacional, Lima, Peru | 3 – (8', 26', 32') | 3–3 | Friendly | |
| 7 | Gerd Müller | 8 September 1971 | West Germany | Niedersachsenstadion, Hanover, Germany | 3 – (11', 15', 56') | 0–5 | Friendly | |
| 8 | Paolo Rossi | 4 February 1984 | Italy | Stadio Olimpico, Rome, Italy | 3 – (12', 37', 44') | 0–5 | Friendly | |
| 9 | Aleksandr Borodyuk | 2 February 1994 | Russia | Oakland Coliseum, Oakland, United States | 3 – (4', 45', 56') | 1–4 | Friendly | |
| 10 | Romário | 30 April 1997 | Brazil | Miami Orange Bowl, Miami, United States | 3 – (13', 18', 75') | 0–4 | Friendly | |
| 11 | Carlos Pavón | 20 June 2001 | Honduras | Estadio Morazán, San Pedro Sula, Honduras | 3 – (32', 56', 65' pen.) | 1–3 | 2002 FIFA World Cup qualification | |
| 12 | Eduardo Vargas | 18 June 2016 | Chile | Levi's Stadium, Santa Clara, United States | 4 – (44', 52', 57', 74') | 0–7 | Copa América Centenario | |
| 13 | Lautaro Martínez | 10 September 2019 | Argentina | Alamodome, San Antonio, United States | 3 – (17', 22', 39') | 0–4 | Friendly | |
| 14 | Darwin Núñez | 5 June 2024 | Uruguay | Empower Field at Mile High, Denver, United States | 3 – (7', 44', 49') | 0–4 | Friendly | |
