= 1934 FIFA World Cup qualification =

Tournament details
- Dates: 11 June 1933 – 24 May 1934
- Teams: 29

Tournament statistics
- Matches played: 27
- Goals scored: 141 (5.22 per match)
- Top scorer(s): (Spain) Isidro Lángara (Cuba) Mario López (Mexico) Dionisio Mejía (7 goals each)

The 1934 FIFA World Cup was the first World Cup for which teams had to qualify, after the finalists in the inaugural 1930 World Cup had participated by invitation from FIFA. With 32 teams having entered the 1934 competition, FIFA organized qualification rounds to select 16 teams for the finals. Even Italy, the host of the World Cup, had to earn its spot, the only time this has been the case. (Note: 2010 host South Africa and 2022 host Qatar also participated in the respective World Cup qualification because those tournaments doubled as continental qualifiers, but those teams were guaranteed spots in the World Cups and were only vying for places in the continental finals.) The previous champion Uruguay refused to defend its title because many European nations had declined to take part in the 1930 World Cup, held in Uruguay.

Of the 32 teams which entered,

- Chile, Peru and Turkey all withdrew before qualifying began.
- Brazil and Argentina qualified without playing any matches owing to the withdrawal of their opponents.
- The other 27 teams played at least one qualifying match.
- Greece, Bulgaria and Poland withdrew partway through the planned schedule of qualifying matches.

The first match, between Sweden and Estonia, took place in Stockholm on 11 June 1933, with Swedish player Knut Kroon scoring the first goal. (Note: Some sources report it as an own goal by Estonian goalkeeper Evald Tipner instead.) The last match was played in Rome only three days before the start of the tournament, as late entrant United States beat Mexico to become the final team to qualify.

== Format ==
The 32 teams were divided into 12 groups, based on geographical considerations, as follows:

- Groups 1 to 8 – Europe: 12 places, contested by 21 teams. Groups were organised regionally so as to minimise travel distance, with most groups consisting of neighbouring countries.
- Groups 9, 10 and 11 – Americas: 3 places, contested by 8 teams.
- Group 12 – Africa and Asia: 1 place, contested by 3 teams (including Turkey).

The 12 groups had different rules, as follows:

- Group 1 had 3 teams. The teams played against each other once, with each team playing one home and one away game. The group winner would qualify.
- Groups 2, 3 and 5 had 2 teams each. The teams played against each other on a home-and-away basis. The group winners would qualify.
- Group 4 had 3 teams. The teams played against each other twice. The group winner and runner-up would qualify.
- Groups 6, 7 and 8 had 3 teams each. The teams played against each other once, with each team playing one home and one away game. The group winners and runners-up would qualify.
- Groups 9 and 10 had 2 teams each. The group winners would qualify.
- Group 11 had 4 teams. There would be three rounds of play:
  - First Round: Haiti played against Cuba three times, all games taking place in Haiti. The winner would advance to the Second Round.
  - Second Round: Mexico played against the winner of the First Round thrice at home. The winner would advance to the Final Round.
  - Final Round: USA played against the winner of the Second Round in a single match on neutral ground. The winner would qualify.
- Group 12 had 3 teams. After Turkey withdrew before the matches began, the remaining 2 teams played against each other on a home-and-away basis. The group winner would qualify.

Key:

- Teams highlighted in green qualified for the finals.
- Teams highlighted in orange qualified for the next phase of their group.

== Groups ==
=== Group 1 ===
Pos	Team	Pld	W	D	L	GF	GA	GAv	Pts	Qualification
1	Sweden	2	2	0	0	8	2	4.000	4	Final tournament
2	Estonia	1	0	0	1	2	6	0.333	0	
3	Lithuania	1	0	0	1	0	2	0.000	0	

Source: None
11 June 1933

Sweden	6–2	Estonia
Kroon 7'; L. Bunke 10'; Ericsson 13', 70'; T. Bunke 43'; Andersson 79' (pen.)	Report	Kass 47'; Kuremaa 61'

Stockholm Olympic Stadium, Stockholm, Sweden
Attendance: 8,123
Referee: Reidar Randers-Johansen (Norway)

29 June 1933

Lithuania	0–2	Sweden
	Report	Hansson 55', 65'

Kariuomenės Stadionas, Kaunas, Lithuania
Attendance: 6,000
Referee: August Silber (Estonia)

Estonia v Lithuania was not played since neither team could qualify with a win.

Sweden qualified.

=== Group 2 ===
Pos	Team	Pld	W	D	L	GF	GA	GAv	Pts	Qualification
1	Spain	2	2	0	0	11	1	11.000	4	Final tournament
2	Portugal	2	0	0	2	1	11	0.091	0	

Source: None
11 March 1934

Spain	9–0	Portugal
González 3'; Lángara 13', 14' (pen.), 46', 71', 85'; Regueiro 65', 70'; Ventolrà 68'	Report

Estadio Chamartín, Madrid, Spain
Attendance: 50,000
Referee: Raphaël van Praag (Belgium)

18 March 1934

Portugal	1–2	Spain
Silva 10'	Report	Lángara 12', 25'

Estádio do Lumiar, Lisbon, Portugal
Attendance: 35,000
Referee: Raphaël van Praag (Belgium)

Spain qualified.

=== Group 3 ===
Rank	Team	Pld	W	D	L	GF	GA	GAv	Pts	Qualification
1	Italy	1	1	0	0	4	0	4.00	2	Final Tournament
2	Greece	1	0	0	1	0	4	0.00	0	

25 March 1934

Italy	4–0	Greece
Guarisi 40'; Meazza 44', 71'; Ferrari 69'	Report

San Siro, Milan, Italy
Attendance: 20,000
Referee: René Mercet (Switzerland)

Italy qualified, as Greece declined to play the second match.

=== Group 4 ===
Rank	Team	Pld	W	D	L	GF	GA	GAv	Pts	Qualification
1	Hungary	2	2	0	0	8	2	4.00	4	Final Tournament
2	Austria	1	1	0	0	6	1	6.00	2	Final Tournament
3	Bulgaria	3	0	0	3	3	14	0.21	0	

25 March 1934

Bulgaria	1–4	Hungary
Baikushev 27'	Report	Sárosi 29'; Szabó 61' (pen.); Toldi 88'; Markos 89'

A.S. 23 Stadium, Sofia, Bulgaria
Attendance: 10,000
Referee: Denis Xifando (Romania)

25 April 1934

Austria	6–1	Bulgaria
Horvath 19', 22', 33'; Zischek 59'; Viertl 62'; Sindelar 67'	Report	Lozanov 66'

Praterstadion, Vienna, Austria
Attendance: 25,000
Referee: František Cejnar (Czechoslovakia)

29 April 1934

Hungary	4–1	Bulgaria
Szabó 9', 58'; Solti 60', 73'	Report	Todorov 61'

Hungária-körút, Budapest, Hungary
Attendance: 10,000
Referee: Hans Frankenstein (Austria)

Bulgaria withdrew, and the remaining matches were not played since Hungary and Austria were already assured of the top two spots.

Hungary and Austria qualified.

=== Group 5 ===
Rank	Team	Pld	W	D	L	GF	GA	GAv	Pts	Qualification
1	Czechoslovakia	2	2	0	0	4	1	4.00	4	Final Tournament
2	Poland	2	0	0	2	1	4	0.25	0	

15 October 1933

Poland	1–2	Czechoslovakia
Martyna 52' (pen.)	Report	Silný 33'; Pelcner 77'

Polish Army Stadium, Warsaw, Poland
Attendance: 16,000
Referee: Denis Xifando (Romania)

15 April 1934

Czechoslovakia	2–0 awarded (Note: Poland were unable to travel to Prague for the second match as the Polish government denied the team visas for political reasons. The match was awarded as 2–0 to Czechoslovakia.)	Poland

Prague, Czechoslovakia

Czechoslovakia qualified.

=== Group 6 ===
Rank	Team	Pld	W	D	L	GF	GA	GAv	Pts	Qualification
1	Switzerland	2	1	1	0	4	2	2.00	3	Final Tournament
2	Romania	2	1	0	1	2	3	0.67	2	Final Tournament
3	Yugoslavia	2	0	1	1	3	4	0.75	1	

24 September 1933

Yugoslavia	2–2	Switzerland
Kragić 50'; Marjanović 61'	Report	Frigerio 76'; Jäggi 80'

Stadion BSK, Belgrade, Yugoslavia
Attendance: 17,000
Referee: Alois Beranek (Austria)

29 October 1933

Switzerland	2–0 awarded (Note: The match ended in a 2–2 draw. FIFA later awarded the match as 2–0 to Switzerland as a result of Romania having fielded ineligible player Iuliu Baratky.)	Romania
	Report

Wankdorf Stadion, Bern, Switzerland
Attendance: 15,000
Referee: Hans Boekmann (Netherlands)

29 April 1934

Romania	2–1	Yugoslavia
Schwartz 38'; Dobay 74'	Report	Kragić 71'

Stadionul ONEF, Bucharest, Romania
Attendance: 20,000
Referee: John Langenus (Belgium)

Switzerland and Romania qualified.

=== Group 7 ===
Pos	Team	Pld	W	D	L	GF	GA	GAv	Pts	Qualification
1	Netherlands	2	2	0	0	9	4	2.250	4	Final tournament
2	Belgium	2	0	1	1	6	8	0.750	1	Final tournament
3	Irish Free State	2	0	1	1	6	9	0.667	1	

Source: None
25 February 1934

Irish Free State	4–4	Belgium
Moore 27', 48', 56', 75'	Report	Capelle 15'; S. Vanden Eynde 30'; F. Vanden Eynde 47', 60'

Dalymount Park, Dublin, Irish Free State
Attendance: 28,000
Referee: Thomas Crewe (England)

8 April 1934

Netherlands	5–2	Irish Free State
Smit 41', 85'; Bakhuys 67', 78'; Vente 83'	Report	Squires 44'; Moore 57'

Olympisch Stadion, Amsterdam, Netherlands
Attendance: 38,000
Referee: Otto Ohlsson (Sweden)

29 April 1934

Belgium	2–4	Netherlands
Grimmonprez 51'; Voorhoof 71'	Report	Smit 60'; Bakhuys 62', 84'; Vente 64'

Bosuil Stadion, Antwerp, Belgium
Attendance: 33,000
Referee: Stanley Rous (England)

Netherlands and Belgium qualified (Belgium finished above the Irish Free State on goal average).

=== Group 8 ===
Rank	Team	Pld	W	D	L	GF	GA	GAv	Pts	Qualification
1	Germany	1	1	0	0	9	1	9.00	2	Final Tournament
2	France	1	1	0	0	6	1	6.00	2	Final Tournament
3	Luxembourg	2	0	0	2	2	15	0.13	0	

11 March 1934

Luxembourg	1–9	Germany
Mengel 27'	Report; Report	Rasselnberg 2', 35', 57', 89'; Wigold 12'; Albrecht 24'; Hohmann 30', 52', 53'

Stade Municipal, Luxembourg, Luxembourg
Attendance: 16,000
Referee: Jan de Wolf (Netherlands)

15 April 1934

Luxembourg	1–6	France
Speicher 47'	Report	Aston 3'; Nicolas 26', 67', 85', 89' (pen.); Liberati 80'

Stade Municipal, Luxembourg, Luxembourg
Attendance: 18,000
Referee: Marc Turfkruyer (Belgium)

Germany v France was not played since both teams were already assured of the top two spots.

Germany and France qualified.

=== Group 9 ===
Rank	Team	Pld	W	D	L	GF	GA	GAv	Pts	Qualification
1	Brazil									Final Tournament
2	Peru	Withdrew								

Peru withdrew, so Brazil qualified automatically.

=== Group 10 ===
Rank	Team	Pld	W	D	L	GF	GA	GAv	Pts	Qualification
1	Argentina									Final Tournament
2	Chile	Withdrew								

Chile withdrew, so Argentina qualified automatically.

=== Group 11 ===
==== First round ====
Pos	Team	Pld	W	D	L	GF	GA	GAv	Pts	Qualification
1	Cuba	3	2	1	0	10	2	5.000	5	Advance to second round
2	Haiti	3	0	1	2	2	10	0.200	1	

Source: RSSSF
28 January 1934
18:00 EST (UTC−05:00)

Haiti	1–3	Cuba
St. Fort 85' (pen.)	Report	López 20' (pen.); H. Socorro 61'; Martínez 64'

Parc Leconte, Port-au-Prince, Haiti
Attendance: 6,000
Referee: John Williams (United States)

1 February 1934
18:00 EST (UTC−05:00)

Haiti	1–1	Cuba
St. Fort 25' (pen.)	Report	López 85'

Parc Leconte, Port-au-Prince, Haiti
Attendance: 6,000
Referee: John Williams (United States)

4 February 1934
18:00 EST (UTC−05:00)

Haiti	0–6	Cuba
	Report	H. Socorro 5'; López 18', 86'; F. Socorro 37'; Ferrer 62'; Soto 78'

Parc Leconte, Port-au-Prince, Haiti
Attendance: 5,000
Referee: John Williams (United States)

Cuba advanced to the Second Round.

==== Second round ====
Pos	Team	Pld	W	D	L	GF	GA	GAv	Pts	Qualification
1	Mexico	3	3	0	0	12	3	4.000	6	Advance to final round
2	Cuba	3	0	0	3	3	12	0.250	0	

Source: None
4 March 1934

Mexico	3–2	Cuba
Mejía 12', 14', 16'	Report	López 40', 63'

Parque Necaxa, Mexico City, Mexico
Attendance: 20,000
Referee: Edward Donaghy (United States)

11 March 1934

Mexico	5–0	Cuba
Sota 24'; Mejía 31', 40', 79'; Rosas 72'	Report

Parque Necaxa, Mexico City, Mexico
Attendance: 22,000
Referee: Edward Donaghy (United States)

18 March 1934

Mexico	4–1	Cuba
Alonso 32', 75'; Ruvalcaba 41'; Marcos 55'	Report	López 15'

Parque Necaxa, Mexico City, Mexico
Attendance: 10,000
Referee: Edward Donaghy (United States)

Mexico advanced to the Final Round.

==== Final round ====
The match to decide whether the United States or Mexico would qualify was played only three days before the start of the final tournament, as the United States submitted their entry too late. Thus, the match was played in Italy, so that the winner would effectively stay in the country for the tournament.

Pos	Team	Pld	W	D	L	GF	GA	GAv	Pts	Qualification
1	United States	1	1	0	0	4	2	2.000	2	Final tournament
2	Mexico	1	0	0	1	2	4	0.500	0	

Source: None
24 May 1934

United States	4–2	Mexico
Donelli 28', 32', 74', 87'	Report	Alonso 25'; Mejía 75'

Stadio Nazionale, Rome, Italy
Attendance: 12,000
Referee: Yossouf Mohammed (Egypt)

United States qualified.

=== Group 12 ===
The Palestine football team consisted exclusively of Jewish and British players.

FIFA states, in reference to the 1930s Palestine Mandate team, that the 'Palestine team' that participated in previous competitions in the 1930s was actually the forerunner of today's Israel team, and as such bears no relation to the modern-day Palestine national team. However, the region currently known as Palestine is considered one of the first Asian teams to compete in the FIFA World Cup qualifiers.

Pos	Team	Pld	W	D	L	GF	GA	GAv	Pts	Qualification
1	Egypt	2	2	0	0	11	2	5.500	4	Final tournament
2	Mandatory Palestine	2	0	0	2	2	11	0.182	0	
3	Turkey	0	0	0	0	0	0	—	0	Withdrew

Source: None
16 March 1934

Egypt	7–1	Mandatory Palestine
El-Tetsh 11', 35', 51'; Taha 21', 79'; Latif 43', 87'	Report; Report	Nudelman

British Army Ground, Cairo, Egypt
Attendance: 13,000
Referee: Stanley Wells (England)

6 April 1934

Mandatory Palestine	1–4	Egypt
Sukenik 54'	Report; Report	Latif 2'; El-Tetsh 7', 22'; Fawzi 35'

Palms Ground, Tel Aviv, Mandatory Palestine
Attendance: 5,000 / 8,000
Referee: Frederick Goodsby (England)

11–2 on aggregate; Egypt qualified.

== Qualified teams ==
Only six of the teams qualifying for the final competition – Argentina, Belgium, Brazil, France, Romania, and the USA – had already attended the World Cup in 1930.

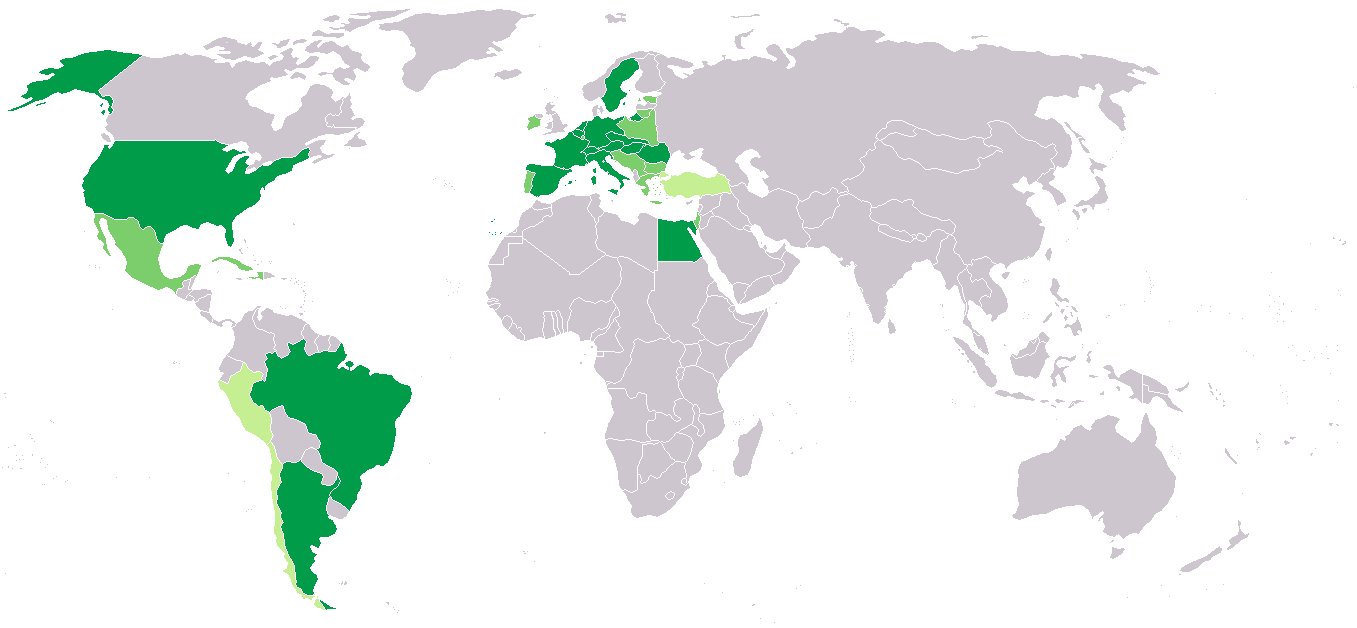
1934 FIFA World Cup qualification participants

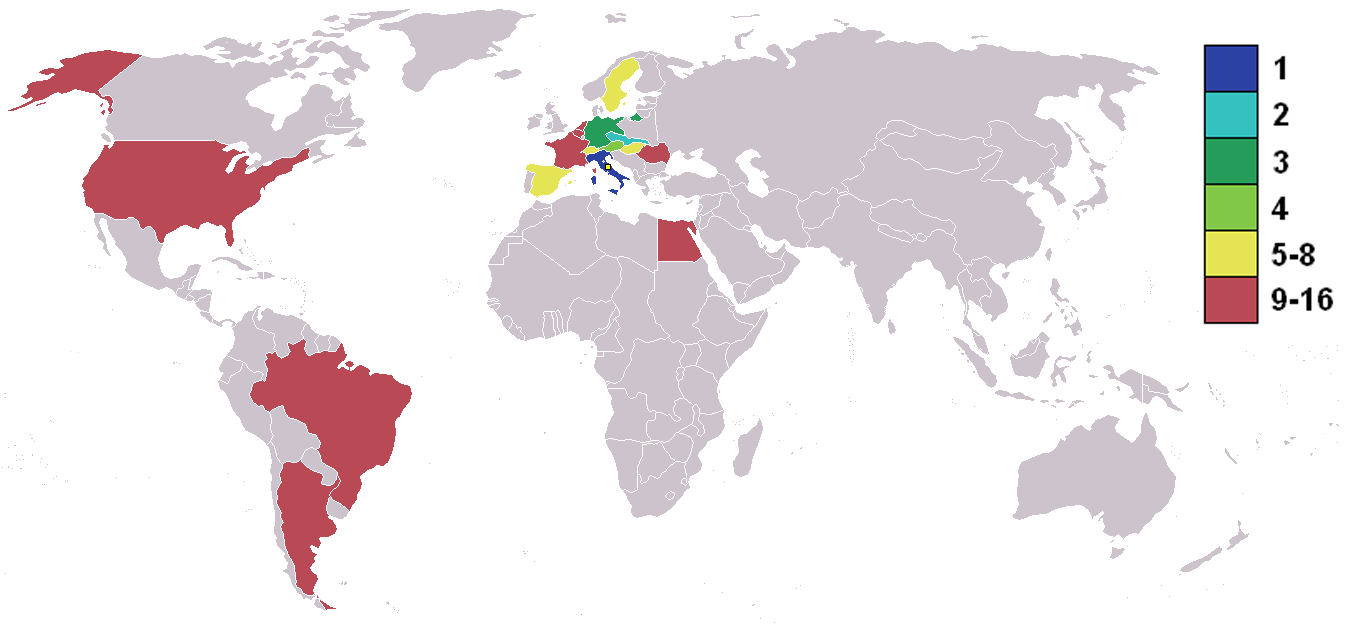
Qualifying countries

Team	Finals Appearance	Streak	Last Appearance
Argentina	2nd	2	1930
Austria	1st	1	—
Belgium	2nd	2	1930
Brazil	2nd	2	1930
Czechoslovakia	1st	1	—
Egypt	1st	1	—
France	2nd	2	1930
Germany	1st	1	—
Hungary	1st	1	—
Italy	1st	1	—
Netherlands	1st	1	—
Romania	2nd	2	1930
Spain	1st	1	—
Sweden	1st	1	—
Switzerland	1st	1	—
United States	2nd	2	1930

== Goalscorers ==
7 goals

- (Cuba) Mario López
- (Mexico) Dionisio Mejía
- (Spain) Isidro Lángara

5 goals

- (Egypt) Mahmoud Mokhtar El Tetsh
- (Irish Free State) Paddy Moore

4 goals

- (France) Jean Nicolas
- (Germany) Josef Rasselnberg
- (Netherlands) Beb Bakhuys
- (United States) Aldo Donelli

3 goals

- (Austria) Johann Horvath
- (Egypt) Mohamed Latif
- (Germany) Karl Hohmann
- (Hungary) Gábor P. Szabó
- (Mexico) Manuel Alonso
- (Netherlands) Kick Smit

2 goals

- (Belgium) François Vanden Eynde
- (Cuba) Héctor Socorro
- (Egypt) Mostafa Taha
- (Haiti) Robert St. Fort
- (Hungary) József Solti
- (Italy) Giuseppe Meazza
- (Netherlands) Leen Vente
- (Romania) Ștefan Dobay
- (Spain) Luis Regueiro
- (Sweden) Bertil Ericsson
- (Sweden) Knut Hansson
- (Kingdom of Yugoslavia) Vladimir Kragić

1 goal

- (Austria) Matthias Sindelar
- (Austria) Rudolf Viertl
- (Austria) Karl Zischek
- (Belgium) Jean Capelle
- (Belgium) Stan Vanden Eynde
- (Belgium) Laurent Grimmonprez
- (Belgium) Bernard Voorhoof
- (Bulgaria) Dimitar Baikushev
- (Bulgaria) Mihail Lozanov
- (Bulgaria) Vladimir Todorov
- (Cuba) Enrique Ferrer
- (Cuba) Ángel Martínez
- (Cuba) Francisco Socorro
- (Cuba) Salvador Soto
- (Czechoslovakia) František Pelcner
- (Czechoslovakia) Josef Silný
- (Egypt) Abdulrahman Fawzi
- (Estonia) Leonhard Kass
- (Estonia) Richard Kuremaa
- (France) Alfred Aston
- (France) Ernest Libérati
- (Germany) Ernst Albrecht
- (Germany) Willi Wigold
- (Hungary) Imre Markos
- (Hungary) György Sárosi
- (Hungary) Géza Toldi
- (Irish Free State) Johnny Squires
- (Italy) Giovanni Ferrari
- (Italy) Anfilogino Guarisi
- (Luxembourg) Ernest Mengel
- (Luxembourg) Théophile Speicher
- (Mandatory Palestine) Avraham Nudelmann
- (Mandatory Palestine) Yohanan Sukenik
- (Mexico) Fernando Marcos
- (Mexico) Felipe Rosas
- (Mexico) José Ruvalcaba
- (Mexico) Jorge Sota
- (Poland) Henryk Martyna
- (Portugal) Vítor Silva
- (Romania) Sándor Schwartz
- (Romania) Grațian Sepi
- (Spain) Eduardo González
- (Spain) Martí Ventolrà
- (Sweden) Sven Andersson
- (Sweden) Lennart Bunke
- (Sweden) Torsten Bunke
- (Sweden) Knut Kroon
- (Switzerland) Alessandro Frigerio
- (Switzerland) Erwin Hochsträsser
- (Switzerland) Ernst Hufschmid
- (Switzerland) Willy Jäggi
- (Kingdom of Yugoslavia) Blagoje Marjanović
