= List of international goals scored by Javier Hernández =

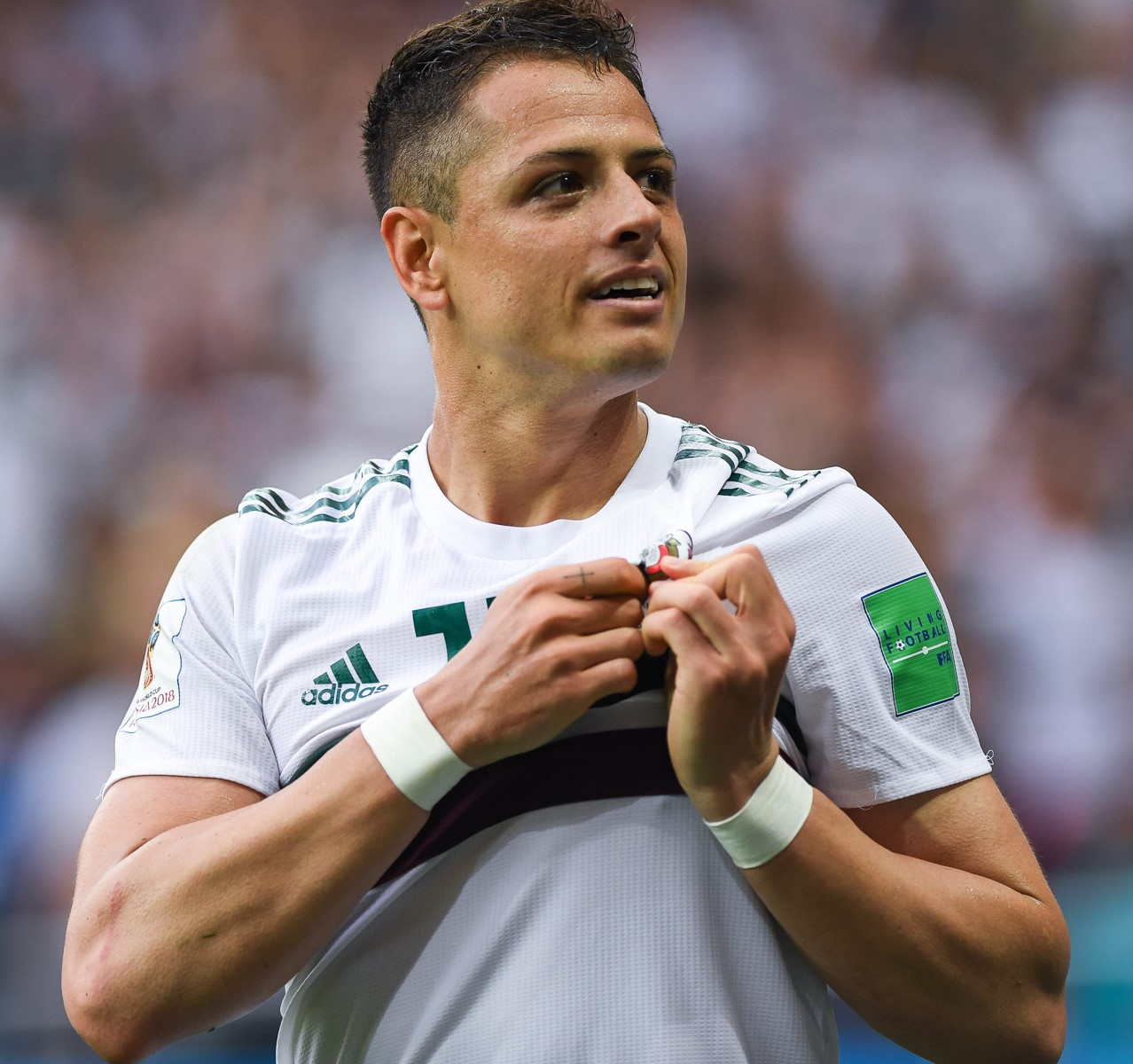
Hernández, playing for Mexico against South Korea at the 2018 FIFA World Cup

Javier Hernández, also known by his nickname Chicharito ([tʃitʃaˈɾito]; Mexican Spanish: little pea), is a professional association football player who has represented Mexico (nicknamed "El Tri") in international football from 2009 to 2019. He is the country's all-time top scorer with 52 goals in 109 appearances, as of 6 September 2019. Hernández plays primarily as a "goal poacher", with most of his goals from close-range and within the penalty area, and is Mexico's star player.

Hernández found club success with C.D. Guadalajara in Liga MX, where his grandfather played and his father coached. He was called up to the national team and made his debut alongside four other players on 30 September 2009 in a friendly match against Colombia, assisting on Mexico's sole goal during the 2–1 loss in Dallas, Texas, United States. He scored his first two goals in his second appearance, a 5–0 friendly win over Bolivia on 24 February 2010 in San Francisco, California, United States. Hernández was called into Mexico's squad for the 2010 FIFA World Cup, where he scored two goals against France and Argentina. His first goal against France mirrored his grandfather Tomás Balcázar's debut at the 1954 FIFA World Cup, also against France and at the same age of 22. He scored his first international hat-trick against El Salvador during the 2011 CONCACAF Gold Cup in the United States and finished the tournament as the top goalscorer, with seven goals, and was named the most valuable player after Mexico's victory.

Hernández went on to score three goals at the 2013 FIFA Confederations Cup against Italy and Japan, but struggled to score in subsequent friendlies and World Cup qualification matches. He was not chosen to start at the 2014 FIFA World Cup, but did score one goal as a substitute against Croatia to help Mexico qualify for the knockout rounds. By the following spring, Hernández had scored goals during several friendlies, but was ruled out of the 2015 CONCACAF Gold Cup due to a shoulder injury. He returned to the national team for the 2015 CONCACAF Cup, a special one-match tournament against the United States to determine qualification for 2017 FIFA Confederations Cup; Mexico won the match 3–2, with Hernández scoring the first goal of the match and his first against the United States.

Hernández scored one goal for Mexico at the Copa América Centenario in 2016, during a group stage match against Jamaica, and came within one goal of tying the all-time goal-scoring record for Mexico. He tied Jared Borgetti's record of 46 goals on 24 March 2017, during a 2–0 victory over Costa Rica in World Cup qualification. Both players reached 46 goals in 89 appearances, but Hernández had reached earlier milestones of 20, 30, and 40 goals faster than any other Mexican player. He surpassed Borgetti's record on 27 May 2017, during a friendly against Croatia in Los Angeles that Mexico lost 2–1. Hernández became the first Mexican player to score 50 international goals on 23 June 2018, during a group stage match at the 2018 FIFA World Cup against South Korea. He also became the third Mexican player to score in three different World Cups, after Cuauhtémoc Blanco and Rafael Márquez, and tied Luis Hernández's record for most total goals at the World Cup.

== International goals ==
"Score" represents the score in the match after Hernández's goal. "Score" and "Result" list Mexico's goal tally first.
As of 6 September 2019.

List of international goals scored by Javier Hernández
| No. | Date | Cap | Venue | Opponent | Score | Result | Competition | Ref. |
|---|---|---|---|---|---|---|---|---|
| 1 | 24 February 2010 | 2 | Candlestick Park, San Francisco, United States | Bolivia | 2–0 | 5–0 | Friendly | |
| 2 | 24 February 2010 | 2 | Candlestick Park, San Francisco, United States | Bolivia | 4–0 | 5–0 | Friendly | |
| 3 | 3 March 2010 | 3 | Rose Bowl, Pasadena, United States | New Zealand | 1–0 | 2–0 | Friendly | |
| 4 | 17 March 2010 | 4 | Estadio Corona, Torreón, Mexico | North Korea | 2–1 | 2–1 | Friendly | |
| 5 | 26 May 2010 | 10 | Schwarzwald-Stadion, Freiburg im Breisgau, Germany | Netherlands | 1–2 | 1–2 | Friendly | |
| 6 | 30 May 2010 | 11 | Hans-Walter-Wild-Stadion, Bayreuth, Germany | Gambia | 1–0 | 5–1 | Friendly | |
| 7 | 30 May 2010 | 11 | Hans-Walter-Wild-Stadion, Bayreuth, Germany | Gambia | 2–0 | 5–1 | Friendly | |
| 8 | 17 June 2010 | 14 | Peter Mokaba Stadium, Polokwane, South Africa | France | 2–0 | 2–0 | 2010 FIFA World Cup | |
| 9 | 27 June 2010 | 16 | Soccer City, Johannesburg, South Africa | Argentina | 1–3 | 1–3 | 2010 FIFA World Cup | |
| 10 | 11 August 2010 | 17 | Estadio Azteca, Mexico City, Mexico | Spain | 1–0 | 1–1 | Friendly | |
| 11 | 12 October 2010 | 20 | Estadio Olímpico Benito Juárez, Ciudad Juárez, Mexico | Venezuela | 1–1 | 2–2 | Friendly | |
| 12 | 9 February 2011 | 21 | Georgia Dome, Atlanta, United States | Bosnia and Herzegovina | 1–0 | 2–0 | Friendly | |
| 13 | 26 March 2011 | 22 | Oakland–Alameda County Coliseum, Oakland, United States | Paraguay | 1–0 | 3–1 | Friendly | |
| 14 | 26 March 2011 | 22 | Oakland–Alameda County Coliseum, Oakland, United States | Paraguay | 3–1 | 3–1 | Friendly | |
| 15 | 5 June 2011 | 24 | Cowboys Stadium, Arlington, United States | El Salvador | 3–0 | 5–0 | 2011 CONCACAF Gold Cup | |
| 16 | 5 June 2011 | 24 | Cowboys Stadium, Arlington, United States | El Salvador | 4–0 | 5–0 | 2011 CONCACAF Gold Cup | |
| 17 | 5 June 2011 | 24 | Cowboys Stadium, Arlington, United States | El Salvador | 5–0 | 5–0 | 2011 CONCACAF Gold Cup | |
| 18 | 9 June 2011 | 25 | Bank of America Stadium, Charlotte, United States | Cuba | 1–0 | 5–0 | 2011 CONCACAF Gold Cup | |
| 19 | 9 June 2011 | 25 | Bank of America Stadium, Charlotte, United States | Cuba | 5–0 | 5–0 | 2011 CONCACAF Gold Cup | |
| 20 | 18 June 2011 | 27 | New Meadowlands Stadium, East Rutherford, United States | Guatemala | 2–1 | 2–1 | 2011 CONCACAF Gold Cup | |
| 21 | 22 June 2011 | 28 | Reliant Stadium, Houston, United States | Honduras | 2–0 | 2–0 | 2011 CONCACAF Gold Cup | |
| 22 | 2 September 2011 | 30 | Pepsi Arena, Warsaw, Poland | Poland | 1–1 | 1–1 | Friendly | |
| 23 | 11 November 2011 | 33 | Estadio Corregidora, Querétaro, Mexico | Serbia | 2–0 | 2–0 | Friendly | |
| 24 | 31 May 2012 | 35 | Soldier Field, Chicago, United States | Bosnia and Herzegovina | 2–1 | 2–1 | Friendly | |
| 25 | 3 June 2012 | 36 | Cowboys Stadium, Arlington, United States | Brazil | 2–0 | 2–0 | Friendly | |
| 26 | 11 September 2012 | 41 | Estadio Azteca, Mexico City, Mexico | Costa Rica | 1–0 | 1–0 | 2014 FIFA World Cup qualification | |
| 27 | 12 October 2012 | 42 | BBVA Compass Stadium, Houston, United States | Guyana | 4–0 | 5–0 | 2014 FIFA World Cup qualification | |
| 28 | 16 October 2012 | 43 | Estadio Corona, Torreón, Mexico | El Salvador | 2–0 | 2–0 | 2014 FIFA World Cup qualification | |
| 29 | 22 March 2013 | 45 | Estadio Olímpico Metropolitano, San Pedro Sula, Honduras | Honduras | 1–0 | 2–2 | 2014 FIFA World Cup qualification | |
| 30 | 22 March 2013 | 45 | Estadio Olímpico Metropolitano, San Pedro Sula, Honduras | Honduras | 2–0 | 2–2 | 2014 FIFA World Cup qualification | |
| 31 | 31 May 2013 | 47 | Reliant Stadium, Houston, United States | Nigeria | 1–0 | 2–2 | Friendly | |
| 32 | 31 May 2013 | 47 | Reliant Stadium, Houston, United States | Nigeria | 2–2 | 2–2 | Friendly | |
| 33 | 16 June 2013 | 51 | Maracanã Stadium, Rio de Janeiro, Brazil | Italy | 1–1 | 1–2 | 2013 FIFA Confederations Cup | |
| 34 | 22 June 2013 | 53 | Estádio Mineirão, Belo Horizonte, Brazil | Japan | 1–0 | 2–1 | 2013 FIFA Confederations Cup | |
| 35 | 22 June 2013 | 53 | Estádio Mineirão, Belo Horizonte, Brazil | Japan | 2–0 | 2–1 | 2013 FIFA Confederations Cup | |
| 36 | 23 June 2014 | 65 | Arena Pernambuco, São Lourenço da Mata, Brazil | Croatia | 3–0 | 3–1 | 2014 FIFA World Cup | |
| 37 | 9 October 2014 | 67 | Estadio Víctor Manuel Reyna, Tuxtla Gutiérrez, Mexico | Honduras | 1–0 | 2–0 | Friendly | |
| 38 | 12 November 2014 | 69 | Amsterdam Arena, Amsterdam, Netherlands | Netherlands | 3–1 | 3–2 | Friendly | |
| 39 | 28 March 2015 | 71 | Los Angeles Memorial Coliseum, Los Angeles, United States | Ecuador | 1–0 | 1–0 | Friendly | |
| 40 | 27 June 2015 | 73 | Citrus Bowl, Orlando, United States | Costa Rica | 2–2 | 2–2 | Friendly | |
| 41 | 8 September 2015 | 75 | AT&T Stadium, Arlington, United States | Argentina | 1–0 | 2–2 | Friendly | |
| 42 | 10 October 2015 | 76 | Rose Bowl, Pasadena, United States | United States | 1–0 | 3–2 | CONCACAF Cup | |
| 43 | 25 March 2016 | 79 | BC Place, Vancouver, Canada | Canada | 1–0 | 3–0 | 2018 FIFA World Cup qualification | |
| 44 | 1 June 2016 | 82 | Qualcomm Stadium, San Diego, United States | Chile | 1–0 | 1–0 | Friendly | |
| 45 | 9 June 2016 | 84 | Rose Bowl, Pasadena, United States | Jamaica | 1–0 | 2–0 | Copa América Centenario | |
| 46 | 24 March 2017 | 89 | Estadio Azteca, Mexico City, Mexico | Costa Rica | 1–0 | 2–0 | 2018 FIFA World Cup qualification | |
| 47 | 27 May 2017 | 91 | Los Angeles Memorial Coliseum, Los Angeles, United States | Croatia | 1–2 | 1–2 | Friendly | |
| 48 | 18 June 2017 | 93 | Kazan Arena, Kazan, Russia | Portugal | 1–1 | 2–2 | 2017 FIFA Confederations Cup | |
| 49 | 6 October 2017 | 98 | Estadio Alfonso Lastras, San Luis Potosí, Mexico | Trinidad and Tobago | 2–1 | 3–1 | 2018 FIFA World Cup qualification | |
| 50 | 23 June 2018 | 104 | Rostov Arena, Rostov-on-Don, Russia | South Korea | 2–0 | 2–1 | 2018 FIFA World Cup | |
| 51 | 26 March 2019 | 108 | Levi's Stadium, Santa Clara, United States | Paraguay | 3–0 | 4–2 | Friendly | |
| 52 | 6 September 2019 | 109 | MetLife Stadium, East Rutherford, United States | United States | 1–0 | 3–0 | Friendly | |

== Statistics ==
As of 6 September 2019 (Source: RSSSF)

=== By year ===
| Year | Caps | Goals |
|---|---|---|
| 2009 | 1 | 0 |
| 2010 | 19 | 11 |
| 2011 | 13 | 12 |
| 2012 | 10 | 5 |
| 2013 | 13 | 7 |
| 2014 | 12 | 3 |
| 2015 | 8 | 4 |
| 2016 | 10 | 3 |
| 2017 | 11 | 4 |
| 2018 | 7 | 1 |
| 2019 | 3 | 2 |
| Total | 109 | 52 |

=== By competition ===
| Competition | Caps | Goals |
|---|---|---|
| Friendlies | 49 | 27 |
| FIFA World Cup qualification | 27 | 8 |
| CONCACAF Gold Cup | 8 | 7 |
| FIFA Confederations Cup | 7 | 4 |
| FIFA World Cup tournaments | 12 | 4 |
| Copa América | 4 | 1 |
| CONCACAF Cup | 1 | 1 |
| Total | 109 | 52 |

== See also ==
- List of men's footballers with 50 or more international goals
- List of Mexico national football team hat-tricks
