= Javier Hernández (footballer, born 1961) =

Mexican footballer (born 1961)

Personal information
- Full name: Javier Nicolás Hernández Gutiérrez
- Date of birth: 1 August 1961 (age 65)
- Place of birth: Tototlán, Jalisco, Mexico
- Height: 1.70 m (5 ft 7 in)
- Position: Midfielder

Senior career*
Years	Team	Apps	(Gls)
1981–1989	UAG	226	(46)
1989–1991	Puebla	81	(9)
1989–1991	Atlas		
1994–1995	UAG	20	(2)
1995–1999	Morelia	102	(1)
Total		430	(58)

International career
1983–1994	Mexico	28	(4)
- * Club domestic league appearances and goals

Javier Nicolás Hernández Gutiérrez (born 1 August 1961) known as Chícharo, is a Mexican former professional footballer who played as a midfielder.

== Club career ==
Hernández played at club level for Tecos, Club Puebla and Morelia. the season 1986-87 and lately went back to the team in 1993–94 season to get the championship.

With Puebla was part of the squad that gave Puebla F.C. its second and last championship in 1989–1990 season, 1991-94 Atlas Guadalajara

== International career ==
He made three appearances for Mexico Under-20s at the 1979 FIFA World Youth Championship. Javier was a member of the Mexico national team to reach the quarter-finals in the 1986 FIFA World Cup and a part of those who were banned from the 1990 FIFA World Cup due to the use of over age players in a U-20 World Cup.

== Managerial career ==
Hernández was previously the manager of Guadalajara's reserve side. He asked for permission to take leave in order to watch his son Javier Hernández Balcázar play at the 2010 World Cup for Mexico. After permission was refused, he decided to quit his job as manager of Guadalajara's reserve side to watch his son play.

== Personal life ==
Hernández is the father of Javier Hernández Balcázar, better known as Chicharito, who is also a Mexican international football player and player for the USL Championship club Atlético Dallas.

Hernández is also the son-in-law of Tomás Balcázar who played for C.D. Guadalajara and played in the 1954 FIFA World Cup for the Mexico national team.
