= Théophile Speicher =

Luxembourgish footballer

Théophile Speicher (12 August 1909 — 6 August 1982) was a Luxembourgish footballer who played as a forward. Born in Hesperange, he represented CA Spora Luxembourg.

Speicher made 18 appearances for the Luxembourg national team, and scored six goals. He made his debut on 1 June 1930 in a 7–4 friendly loss to Belgium, in Bruges, and scored his first two goals in a 6–3 loss to the same opponents in Charleroi. He played two matches in 1934 FIFA World Cup qualification, scoring in a 6–1 home loss to France.

He was called up for the 1936 Olympics, but did not play, with Luxembourg beaten 9–0 by hosts Germany in the first round.
