= Dionisio Mejía =

Mexican footballer (1907–1963)

Personal information
- Full name: Dionisio Mejía Vieyra
- Date of birth: 6 January 1907
- Place of birth: Mexico
- Date of death: 17 July 1963 (aged 56)
- Height: 1.72 m (5 ft 8 in)
- Position: Forward

International career
Years	Team	Apps	(Gls)
1930–1934	Mexico	4	(7)

Dionisio Mejía Vieyra (6 January 1907 – 17 July 1963) was a Mexican football forward who made one appearance for the Mexico at the 1930 FIFA World Cup. He was also part of Mexico's squad for the 1928 Summer Olympics, but he did not play in any matches.

== International career ==
=== International goals ===
Scores and results list Mexico's goal tally first.

No	Date	Venue	Opponent	Score	Result	Competition
1.	4 March 1934	Parque Necaxa, Mexico City, Mexico	Cuba	1–0	3–2	1934 FIFA World Cup qualification
2.	4 March 1934	Parque Necaxa, Mexico City, Mexico	Cuba	2–0	3–2	1934 FIFA World Cup qualification
3.	4 March 1934	Parque Necaxa, Mexico City, Mexico	Cuba	3–0	3–2	1934 FIFA World Cup qualification
4.	11 March 1934	Parque Necaxa, Mexico City, Mexico	Cuba	2–0	5–0	1934 FIFA World Cup qualification
5.	11 March 1934	Parque Necaxa, Mexico City, Mexico	Cuba	3–0	5–0	1934 FIFA World Cup qualification
6.	11 March 1934	Parque Necaxa, Mexico City, Mexico	Cuba	5–0	5–0	1934 FIFA World Cup qualification
7.	24 May 1934	Stadio Nazionale PNF, Rome, Italy	United States	2–3	2–4	1934 FIFA World Cup qualification
