= Javier Hernández =

Mexican footballer (born 1988)

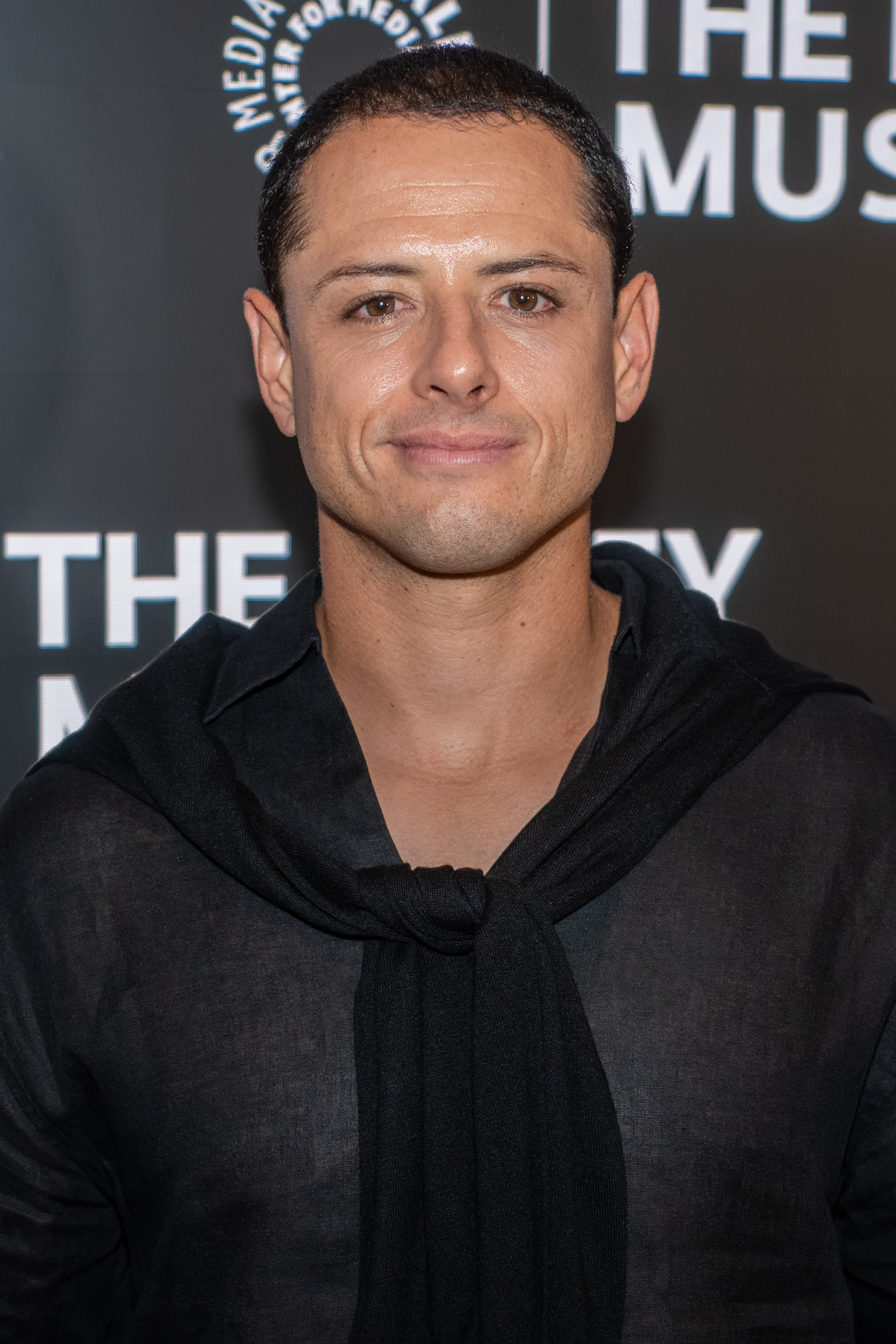
- Hernández in 2026

Personal information
- Full name: Javier Hernández Balcázar
- Date of birth: 1 June 1988 (age 38)
- Place of birth: Guadalajara, Jalisco, Mexico
- Height: 1.75 m (5 ft 9 in)
- Position: Striker

Team information
- Current team: Atlético Dallas

Youth career
- 1997–2005: Guadalajara
- 2005–2006: Coras

Senior career*
Years	Team	Apps	(Gls)
2006–2010	Guadalajara	64	(26)
2010–2015	Manchester United	103	(37)
2014–2015	→ Real Madrid (loan)	23	(7)
2015–2017	Bayer Leverkusen	54	(28)
2017–2019	West Ham United	55	(16)
2019–2020	Sevilla	9	(1)
2020–2023	LA Galaxy	74	(38)
2024–2025	Guadalajara	35	(3)
2026–	Atlético Dallas	0	(0)

International career^{‡}
2007	Mexico U20	2	(1)
2009–2019	Mexico	109	(52)
Medal record
Men's football
Representing Mexico
CONCACAF Gold Cup
Winner	2011 United States
- * Club domestic league appearances and goals as of 30 November 2025 ‡ National team caps and goals as of 7 November 2019

Javier Hernández Balcázar (Spanish: [xaˈβjeɾ eɾˈnandes βalˈkasaɾ]; born 1 June 1988), commonly known by the nickname Chicharito ([tʃitʃaˈɾito], Mexican Spanish: little pea), is a Mexican professional footballer who plays as a striker for USL Championship club Atlético Dallas. He is known for his clinical finishing, pace, and technical ability. He is widely considered among the greatest Mexican players of all time, and regarded as one of the best North American players of all time.

Hernández began his senior club career at age 18 in 2006, playing for Guadalajara, where he won the Primera División. In 2010, Hernández signed for Manchester United, becoming the club's first Mexican player. During his five years with United, he amassed over 150 appearances. He scored 59 goals, winning two Premier League titles, the Sir Matt Busby Player of the Year in his first season, and reached the 2011 UEFA Champions League Final, as well as setting the then record for the fifth-best minutes-per-goal ratio (130.2) in league history. Hernández departed the club on loan to Real Madrid in 2014, winning the FIFA Club World Cup, and in 2015 he joined Bayer Leverkusen on a permanent deal. Hernández returned to England two years later and signed for West Ham United. In 2019, he signed for Sevilla before joining LA Galaxy the following year. In 2024, Hernández rejoined his boyhood club Guadalajara.

A Mexican international, Hernández is the country's all-time leading goalscorer. He debuted for the national team in September 2009 in a friendly match against Colombia. He has represented Mexico at the 2010, 2014, and 2018 FIFA World Cups, the 2011 CONCACAF Gold Cup, the 2013 and 2017 FIFA Confederations Cups, and the Copa América Centenario. He was the 2011 Gold Cup's top scorer with seven goals and was named the tournament's most valuable player.

Hernández is commonly known by the nickname Chicharito, translated from Spanish as "little pea", a diminutive of his father's nickname Chícharo. He is also referred to as CH14, reflecting his initials and shirt number. In December 2023, while streaming on Twitch, he adopted the nickname ChichaGod (or ChichaDios in Spanish).

Hernández is active as a gamer and social commentator on YouTuber and Twitch. As a streamer, under the username "CH14", he has amassed over 623,000 followers on YouTube and 977,000 followers on Twitch as of November 2025.

== Early life ==
Hernández was born on 1 June 1988, in Guadalajara, Jalisco, and his love for football was evident from a young age. He first played in a recreation league when he was seven. Hernández lived in Morelia, Michoacán for over four years while his father, footballer Javier "Chícharo" Hernández, played for Monarcas Morelia. While living in Morelia, Hernández attended elementary school at the Instituto Piaget where he studied from third to sixth grade and played for the school's football team.

At the age of nine, Hernández joined C.D. Guadalajara and signed his first professional contract when he was 15. He was set to play in the 2005 FIFA U-17 World Championship, a significant event in youth football, but an injury sidelined him from the team that ultimately won the championship. Whilst playing football professionally, Hernández was also taking business administration classes at Universidad del Valle de Atemajac. Hernández has held both Hugo Sánchez and Rafael Márquez as his football idols growing up.

== Club career ==
=== C.D. Guadalajara ===
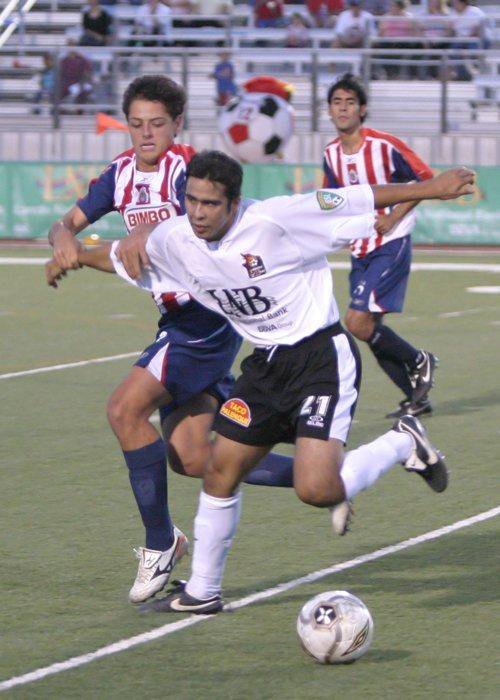
Hernández (left) playing for C.D. Guadalajara against Laredo Heat

Hernández began playing with C.D. Guadalajara's lower-division team, Chivas Coras in Tepic, Nayarit in the 2005–06 season. On 9 September 2006, he made his debut for Guadalajara in that year's Apertura in a win over Club Necaxa at Estadio Jalisco. With the score at 3–0, under manager José Manuel de la Torre, Hernández came on as a substitute for Omar Bravo in the 82nd minute, before scoring the fourth goal of the game five minutes later. It was his only goal in five appearances in 2006 as Guadalajara went on to win the league title. He made two appearances in the 2007 Clausura with no goals. He made six more appearances in 2007–08 without scoring.

Hernández made 10 appearances in the 2008 Apertura without scoring. Still, he scored four goals in 15 appearances in the 2009 Clausura. On 25 February 2009, during a group stage match of that year's edition of the Copa Libertadores, Hernández came on as a substitute and scored a brace against Everton in a 6–2 home victory.

In the 2009 Apertura, Hernández finished as the joint-third top scorer, with 11 goals in 17 appearances. He started the 2010 Torneo Bicentenario with eight goals in five games. He finished as a joint-leader in the goalscoring chart for the 2010 Torneo Bicentenario, with 10 goals in 11 games despite missing five matches due to injury. He also won the tournament's best forward award.

=== Manchester United ===
==== Transfer ====
Hernández on his Manchester United debut

Manchester United was first made aware of Hernández in October 2009; a scout went to Mexico that December and reported positively after watching a few games. Because of Hernández's age, the club originally planned to wait before making a move to sign him. Still, his potential involvement with the national team at the World Cup rushed the club into making a bid. United's chief scout, Jim Lawlor, was sent to Mexico for three weeks in February and March to watch Hernández. He filed another positive report on him before the club solicitor went to Mexico to finalize the paperwork.

On 8 April 2010, Hernández agreed on a deal to sign for Manchester United for an undisclosed fee, subject to a work permit application. The previous day, Hernández had been present at Manchester United's Champions League quarter-final win over Bayern Munich at Old Trafford. The deal was conducted in complete secrecy; Hernández's agent was kept in the dark, as was his grandfather Tomás Balcázar, who thought Hernández was going on a trip to Atlanta in the United States. As part of the deal, United played a friendly against C.D. Guadalajara to open the Mexican club's new stadium on 30 July. On 27 May, the work permit was granted, allowing the transfer to be made official on 1 July.

==== 2010–11: Premier League title and European final ====
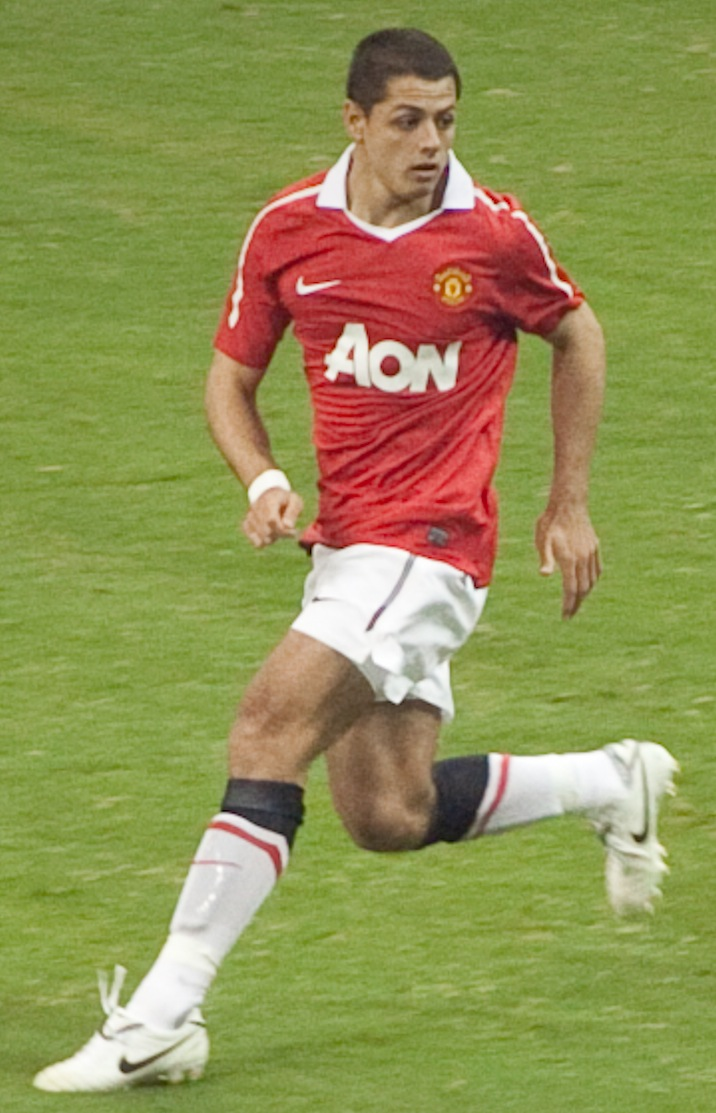
Hernández playing for Manchester United against the MLS All-Stars at the NRG Stadium, Houston in July 2010

Hernández made his United debut on 28 July, coming on as a 63rd-minute substitute for Nani in the 2010 MLS All-Star Game at the NRG Stadium, Houston; he scored his first goal for the club 18 minutes later, lobbing the ball over Nick Rimando from just outside the area after a long through-ball from Darren Fletcher. Two days later, Hernández scored against Manchester United while playing in a friendly for his former club, C.D. Guadalajara, scoring the inaugural goal at their recently constructed stadium; he started the game in a Chivas jersey and scored the first goal after just eight minutes. He switched sides at half-time, but he was unable to prevent a 3–2 defeat for Manchester United. He scored for the third pre-season game in a row as he netted in a 7–1 victory over a League of Ireland XI at the newly built Aviva Stadium on 4 August.

Hernández made his competitive debut on 8 August and scored his first goal in the process, netting United's second of a 3–1 victory over Chelsea in the 2010 FA Community Shield. He came on at the start of the second half. He got on the end of a pass from Antonio Valencia before the Mexican's shot deflected off his face and into the net. On 16 August, Hernández made his Premier League debut as he replaced Wayne Rooney in the 63rd minute of their 3–0 home victory over Newcastle United. He scored his first Champions League goal on 29 September, coming off the bench to score the only goal in an away win over Valencia. He scored his first league goal for United in a 2–2 home draw against West Bromwich Albion on 16 October. Eight days later he scored his first brace for the club, also his first away league goals, in a 2–1 away win over Stoke City. Two days on from this display, he came off the bench to score a last-minute winner, his first ever League Cup goal, in a 3–2 win over Wolves which sent them through to the quarter-finals where they were then knocked out by West Ham United. On 1 January 2011, he came off the bench to head the winning goal in a 2–1 away win over West Bromwich Albion. Hernández became the top scoring Mexican in Premier League history after opening the scoring in a 2–1 home victory over Stoke City on 4 January.

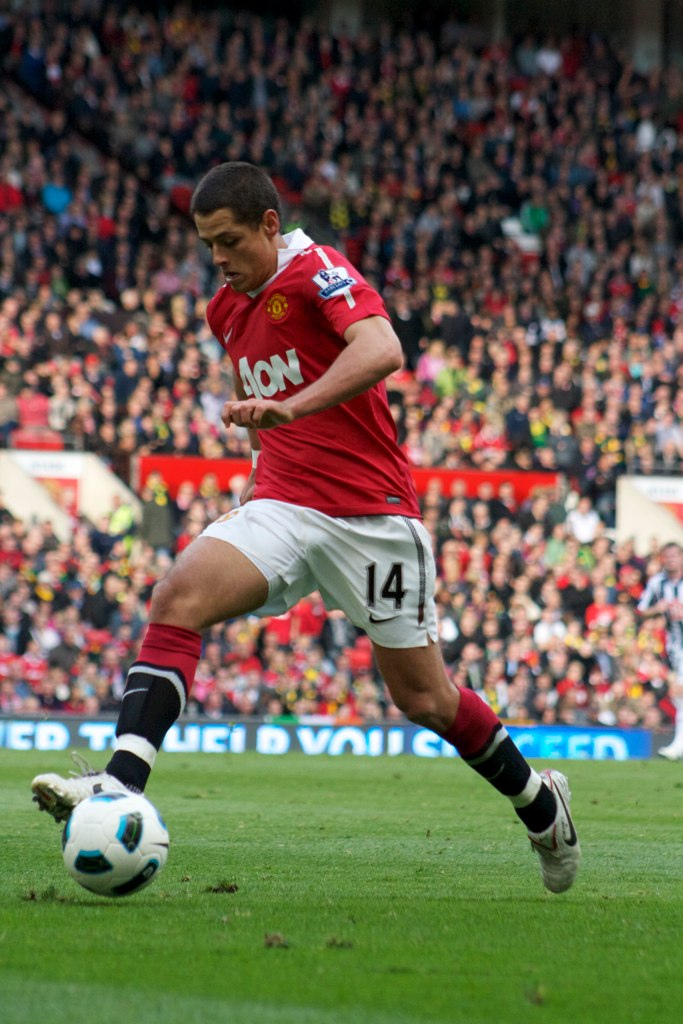
Hernández playing against West Brom at Old Trafford during the 2010–11 season

On 25 January, Hernández scored the equalizing goal of a 3–2 comeback away win over Blackpool. Four days later he scored his first FA Cup goal as he netted the winner in a 2–1 away victory over Southampton. Hernández netted twice in a 4–0 away win over Wigan on 26 February. Eight days later, he netted a late consolation goal in a 3–1 derby defeat away to Liverpool. Hernández netted twice in a 2–1 home win over Marseille on 15 March, sending United through to the quarter-finals of the Champions League. On 2 April, he scored the final goal against West Ham United as they came from two goals down to claim a 4–2 away win. On 8 April, Hernández was revealed as a contender for the PFA Young Player of the Year award alongside teammate Nani. Four days later, he opened the scoring in the 2–1 quarter-final win over Chelsea in the Champions League, with the game ending 3–1 on aggregate, sending United through to the semi-finals. He continued his goal scoring form on 23 April scoring the winning goal with a header in the 1–0 home win over Everton.

On 8 May, Hernández scored the opening goal in a 2–1 home win over Chelsea after just 36 seconds to leave United one point away from winning the title. The goal against Chelsea made him the first player since Ruud van Nistelrooy in the 2001–02 season to score 20 goals for the club in his debut season. Six days later, Hernández won his first league title with United following a 1–1 draw against Blackburn Rovers with one league match remaining, the club's record-breaking 19th league title. Hernández capped his debut season with Manchester United by winning the Sir Matt Busby Player of the Year award on 18 May which was voted for by the fans. On 28 May, Hernández played all 90 minutes in the 3–1 defeat to Barcelona in the Champions League Final. On 5 July 2011, the International Federation of Football History and Statistics named Hernández as the "World Goalgetter 2011", with 13 goals, ahead of other players such as Cristiano Ronaldo, Giuseppe Rossi, and Lionel Messi.

==== 2011–12: Injury hit season ====
After participating in the 2011 CONCACAF Gold Cup with Mexico, Hernández returned to Manchester United to begin pre-season training in New York ahead of the 2011 MLS All-Star Game. On 26 July 2011, he was taken to the hospital after suffering a minor concussion after he was hit on the head with a ball during a training session; he was cleared the next day but did not take part in the game.

On 28 July 2011, it was reported that Rafael Ortega, the doctor at C.D. Guadalajara, informed Manchester United that Hernández was suffering from a pre-existing neurological condition. Ortega also explained that Hernández had suffered from "acute migraines and "headaches" as a teenager. He did not participate in any of United's pre-season matches, nor the 2011 FA Community Shield. He also missed United's opening game of the season against West Bromwich Albion.

Hernández made his first appearance in the 2011–12 season on 22 August in a 3–0 win against Tottenham Hotspur, coming off the bench for Danny Welbeck in the 79th minute. He returned to the starting lineup on 10 September against Bolton Wanderers, scoring twice in a 5–0 victory. On 15 October 2011, Hernández came off the substitutes bench to net a crucial equaliser against Liverpool at Anfield in a 1–1 draw. In the 81st minute, Hernández gambled on Danny Welbeck's flick-on from a corner to steal in and head the equalizer.

Hernández signed a five-year contract on 24 October to tie him to Manchester United until 2016. The following day it was reported that Hernández made the longlist for that year's FIFA Ballon d'Or. Hernández scored his fourth league goal of the season and the winner against Everton at Goodison Park, in a 1–0 victory on 29 October. He then scored his fifth league goal of the season and the winner in United's next away game at Swansea City, a 1–0 win. Hernández scored again in the following game at home to Newcastle United, when Wayne Rooney's shot was blocked by a defender and ricocheted back off Hernández and into the net. He was then carried off the pitch early in United's next league game away at Aston Villa, appearing to go over on his ankle without a challenge from an opponent. After the match, manager Sir Alex Ferguson said Hernández had suffered ankle ligament damage and would be out for up to four weeks. On 18 December, Hernández made a surprise early return against Queens Park Rangers. He came on as a 63rd-minute substitute for Danny Welbeck in United's 2–0 victory at Loftus Road.

On 31 January 2012, Hernández scored his first goal since November and his seventh goal in a 2–0 league win at Old Trafford against Stoke City, scoring the first of two penalties. Hernández continued his scoring form on 5 February at Stamford Bridge against Chelsea, scoring the third goal of a three-goal comeback draw, heading in a cross from Ryan Giggs. On 16 February, Hernández scored his first goal in the Europa League, in a 2–0 away win against Ajax in the round of 32. He scored again in the second leg at Old Trafford on 23 February, but this time in a 2–1 home defeat. However, United still won the tie 3–2 on aggregate. On 18 March, Hernández scored twice in a 5–0 win over Wolverhampton Wanderers.

==== 2012–13: Second Premier League title ====
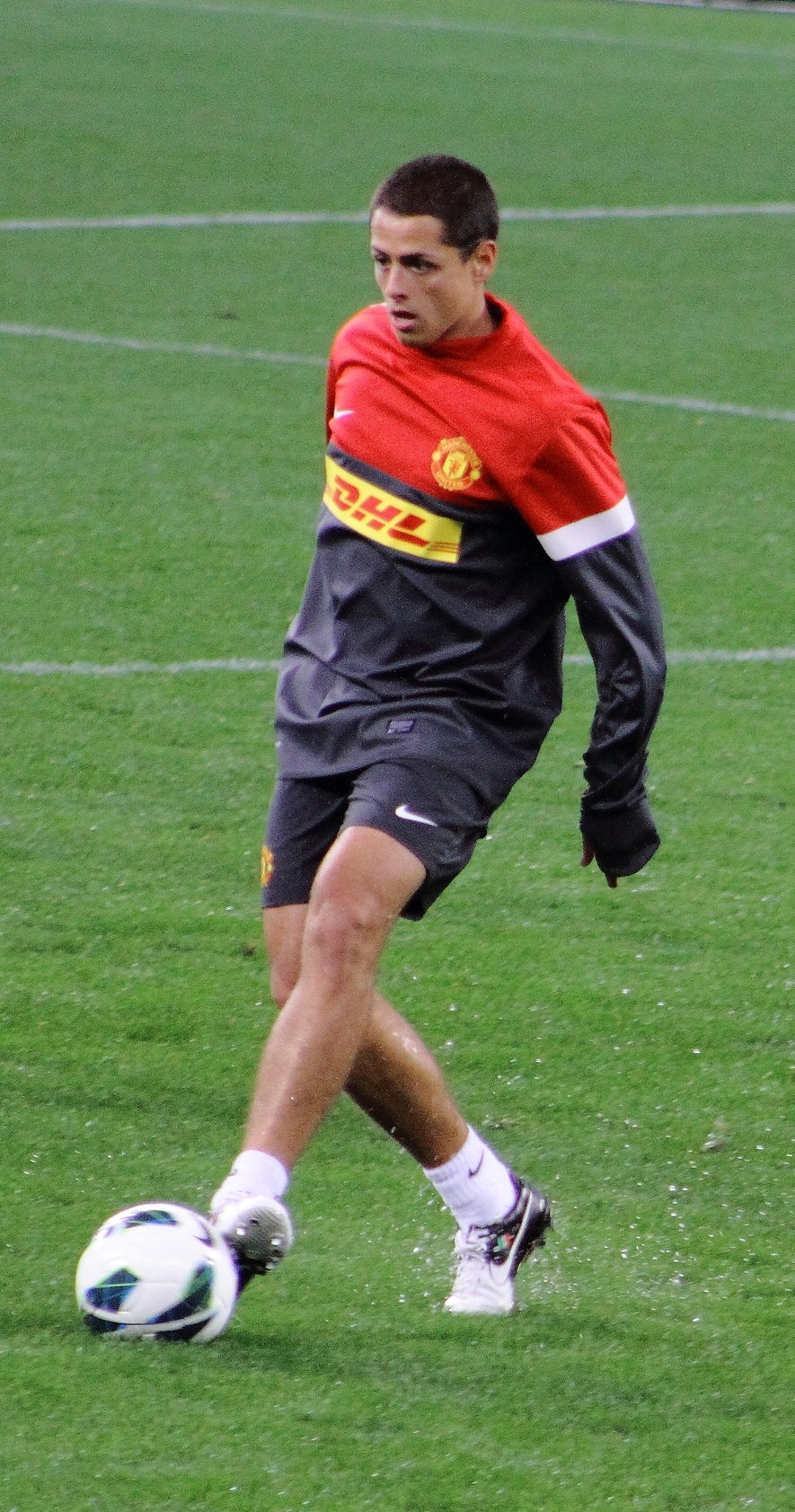
Hernández during a training session with Manchester United in 2012

Hernández began his third season with United on 2 September 2012, coming on as a 72nd-minute substitute for Danny Welbeck in a 3–2 win against Southampton. On 15 September, he was named in the starting eleven for the match against Wigan Athletic, playing all 90 minutes. Despite having a penalty saved in the fifth minute by Wigan goalkeeper Ali Al-Habsi, Hernández scored his first goal of the season, as well as assisting in teammate Nick Powell's goal in a 4–0 victory. On 23 October, Hernández netted a brace in a 3–2 comeback win against Braga in a Champions League group stage match after United had gone down 2–0 in the first half. Five days later, he scored the winner against nine-man Chelsea in a controversial 3–2 win after he was deemed to have been in an offside position when scoring the goal.

On 10 November 2012, Hernández came on as a second-half substitute and scored two goals as United came from 2–0 down to beat Aston Villa 2–3 at Villa Park. At the end of the match, Hernández claimed the hat-trick, but replays showed that his shot for United's second goal was hit wide until turned into his own net by Villa defender Ron Vlaar. On 24 November, he scored his fifth league goal of the season in a 3–1 home win over Queens Park Rangers. On 26 December, Hernández scored United's fourth goal in the final minutes in a 4–3 win over Newcastle United at Old Trafford. He then began 2013 by scoring a brace against Wigan on 1 January, helping United to a 4–0 victory. On 26 January, Hernández would go on to score another brace, this time during an FA Cup match against Fulham which United won 4–1.

In another FA Cup match against Reading on 18 February, Hernández scored in the 72nd minute, giving United a 2–0 lead. His goal would end up being a deciding factor as United went on to win the game 2–1. Although he started in United's 2–0 Premier League victory against QPR on 23 February 2013, he did not score in the match and he didn't score again until 10 March in another FA Cup match against Chelsea which ended in a 2–2 draw. Hernández clinched his second league title with United on 22 April after a 3–0 victory over Aston Villa with four matches left for the season. Hernández opened the scoring in manager Sir Alex Ferguson's final home game at Old Trafford against Swansea City. After a free kick was not cleared, he slotted in from six yards in the first half to put United 1–0 up, in a game they went on to win 2–1. Hernández scored United's last goal of the season and the final goal of the Ferguson era, when he tapped in a cross from close range in a 5–5 draw away at West Bromwich Albion on the final day.

==== 2013–15: Lack of playing time and loan at Real Madrid ====
Hernández scored his first goal of the season under new manager David Moyes on 25 September 2013, netting the only goal of a home win over rivals Liverpool in the third round of the League Cup. On 26 October, with his first league goal of the campaign, he headed the winner as they came from behind to defeat Stoke 3–2 at Old Trafford. Three days later, he recorded a brace – starting with a penalty – in a 4–0 win against Norwich City in the next round of the League Cup. In the tournament's semi-finals, his goal from Adnan Januzaj's cross in the last minute of extra time forced a penalty shootout, which United lost to Sunderland.

On 1 September 2014, Hernández signed for Real Madrid on a season-long loan deal, with an option of a purchase at the end of the loan. He underwent a medical and signed his contract that same day.

He made his debut in the Madrid derby on 13 September, replacing Karim Benzema for the final 27 minutes as the team lost 2–1 at home. On 19 September, Hernández came on as a 77th-minute substitute for Gareth Bale and scored his first two goals in an 8–2 away win against Deportivo de La Coruña — the first goal, scored from outside the box with his left foot, was labeled Goal of the Month.

He scored the winning goal on 22 April 2015 in the 1–0 win over Atlético Madrid, which sent Real Madrid into the semi-finals of the Champions League. Four days later, Hernández scored a brace in Madrid's 2–4 away win over Celta de Vigo. On 26 May, it was announced that Hernández would return to Manchester United following the end of his loan spell after Real Madrid decided not to make the loan move a permanent deal. He made 33 appearances for Los Blancos, scoring 9 goals.

With Real Madrid declining to make an offer for Chicharito, he returned to Manchester. On 29 August 2015, it was reported that manager Louis van Gaal had told Hernández he could leave the club by the end of the transfer window. It was unclear what fee were United expecting for him, who still had one year left on his contract.

Hernández played his final match for Manchester United on 22 August in a draw against Newcastle United at Old Trafford. He came on as a substitute in the 67th minute, replacing Adnan Januzaj. This brought an end to his fruitful spell at Manchester United, having scored 59 goals in 157 games, winning two Premier League titles. In March 2017, van Gaal's successor José Mourinho said that he would have never sold Hernández and believed he would score at least 20 goals a season for his United team.

=== Bayer Leverkusen ===
On 31 August 2015, it was announced Hernández signed a three-year contract with Bundesliga club Bayer Leverkusen for an undisclosed fee, reportedly around £7.3 million.

==== 2015–17: Consecutive seasons as club top scorer ====
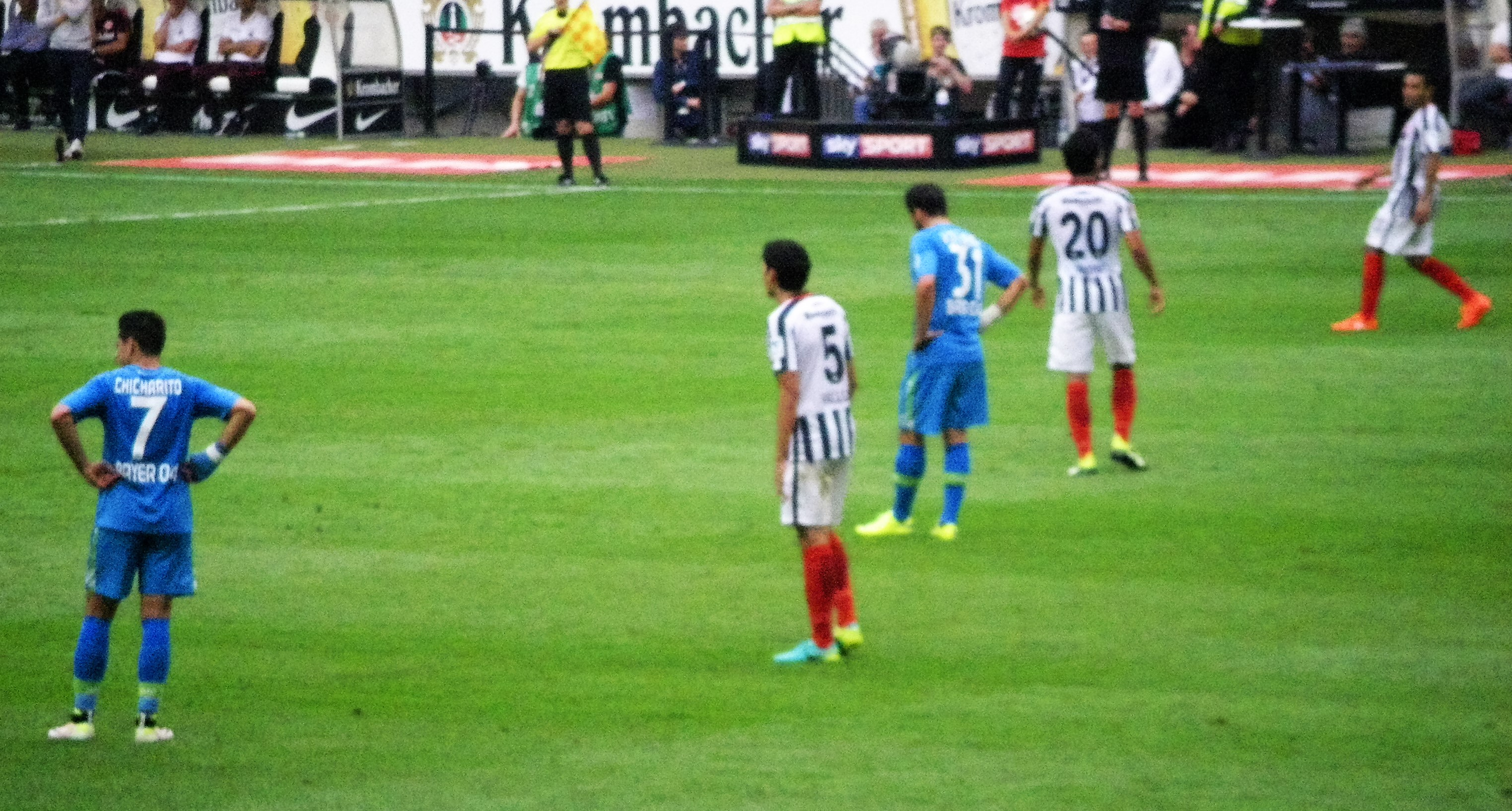
Hernández (number 7) facing off Eintracht Frankfurt in 2016

Hernández was given the number 7 shirt. He made his Bundesliga debut as a 58th-minute substitute in the 1–0 defeat to Darmstadt 98 on 12 September. Four days later he scored his first goal in the Champions League group-stage match against BATE Borisov, scoring the third goal in the 4–1 victory. On 23 September, Hernández scored his first Bundesliga goal in Bayer's 1–0 victory over FSV Mainz, being also named Man of the Match. On 20 October, Hernández scored his first brace for Leverkusen in their 4–4 draw against Roma in the Champions League. Eight days later, he scored a brace in a 6–0 thrashing of Viktoria Köln during the second round of the DFB-Pokal. He ended the Champions League group stage with five goals from six matches but Bayer failed to qualify for the knockout phase, finishing third in Group E and dropping into the Europa League.

Hernández was named Bundesliga Player of the Month for November; a month in which he scored in a 2–1 loss at home to 1. FC Köln and twice in 3–1 win at Eintracht Frankfurt. On 12 December, Hernández scored his first hat-trick in Leverkusen's 5–0 win over Borussia Mönchengladbach, thus scoring 15 goals in his last 12 matches, and taking his tally to 17 goals in 20 games. He would again be named Bundesliga Player of the Month for December.

On 30 January 2016, in Bayer's second match after the winter break, Hernández scored twice in a 3–0 defeat of Hannover 96 to register his 20th and 21st goals of the season. Two days later, he was named for the third time Bundesliga Player of the Month. On 9 February, during the DFB-Pokal quarter-final match against Werder Bremen, he scored the only goal from a penalty in a 3–1 loss as Bayer was eliminated; he finished as joint-second top scorer of the DFB-Pokal with four goals. On 23 April, Hernández scored the final goal in a 3–2 comeback victory against Schalke 04. At the end of his first season with Bayer, he finished as the club's top scorer, notching 17 goals in 28 league appearances. He was included in the Team of the Season.

Hernández scored and provided an assist in Leverkusen's 2–1 win over SC Hauenstein in the first round of the DFB-Pokal on 21 August 2016. Two days later, it was reported that Hernández would miss Bayer's opening match of the season against Borussia Mönchengladbach after sustaining a broken hand. On 17 September, Hernández scored his first goal of the Bundesliga season at Eintracht Frankfurt, however he missed a chance to equalise late from the penalty spot in the 2–1 loss. The following week at FSV Mainz 05, Hernández collected a perfect hat-trick that included a stoppage time winner, the third hat trick of the Bundesliga season. Three days later, he scored Bayer's only goal against Monaco in a Champions League group stage 1–1 draw, marking his 100th goal in official European competitions. He was later named Bundesliga Player of the Month for September.

On 28 January 2017, Hernández scored Bayer Leverkusen's second goal in the 2–3 loss to Borussia Mönchengladbach, ending his eleven-match scoreless streak. On 11 February, he scored a brace against Eintracht Frankfurt in a 3–0 home victory. The following week, he scored another brace in a 3–1 away victory. On 21 February, following the match against Atlético Madrid, Hernández became the Mexican player with the most appearances in the Champions League with 47, surpassing Rafael Márquez's previous record of 46 appearances. His February performances led him to be named Bundesliga Player of the Month for the fifth time. Hernández finished his second season as the club's top scorer again, with 11 goals in 26 league appearances.

=== West Ham United ===
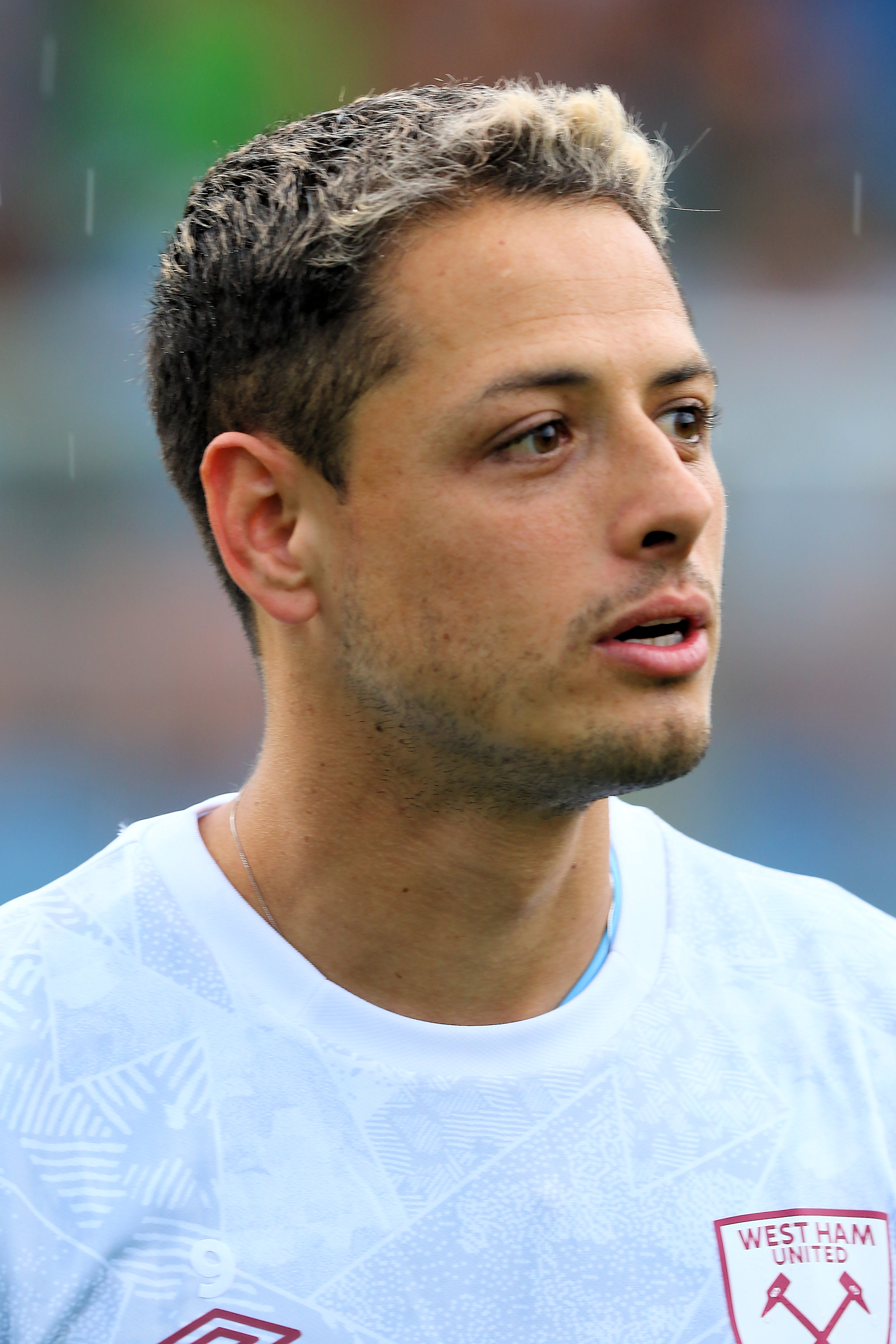
Hernández with West Ham United

==== 2017–20: Record transfer and sustained injuries ====
On 24 July 2017, Hernández joined English club West Ham United for an undisclosed fee, reported to be around £16 million, signing a three-year contract. He was given the number 17 shirt. He made his debut for the West Ham on 13 August, playing all 90 minutes in the 4–0 defeat against his former club Manchester United at Old Trafford. The following week, Hernández scored his first two goals for West Ham in the 3–2 loss to Southampton.

In November, Hernández sustained a hamstring injury while on international duty with Mexico, and it was reported that he would be ruled out from activity for up to two weeks. Following the dismissal of Slaven Bilić and the appointment of David Moyes as manager, there were fears Moyes would sideline Hernández as he had at Manchester United. In response, Moyes referred to him as a "top goalscorer" and "a brilliant finisher". During the winter transfer window there were reports Hernández would leave after only six months, being linked with a move to Turkish club Beşiktaş as well as a possible return to Manchester United.

On 20 January 2018, Hernández came off the bench to score the equalising goal for West Ham in their 1–1 league draw against AFC Bournemouth, scoring his first goal since October. Following the match Moyes praised Hernández's performance, saying "we needed him today." On 8 April, in a league match against Chelsea, he scored a 73rd-minute goal to make the score 1–1, marking the ninth time he had scored against the club.

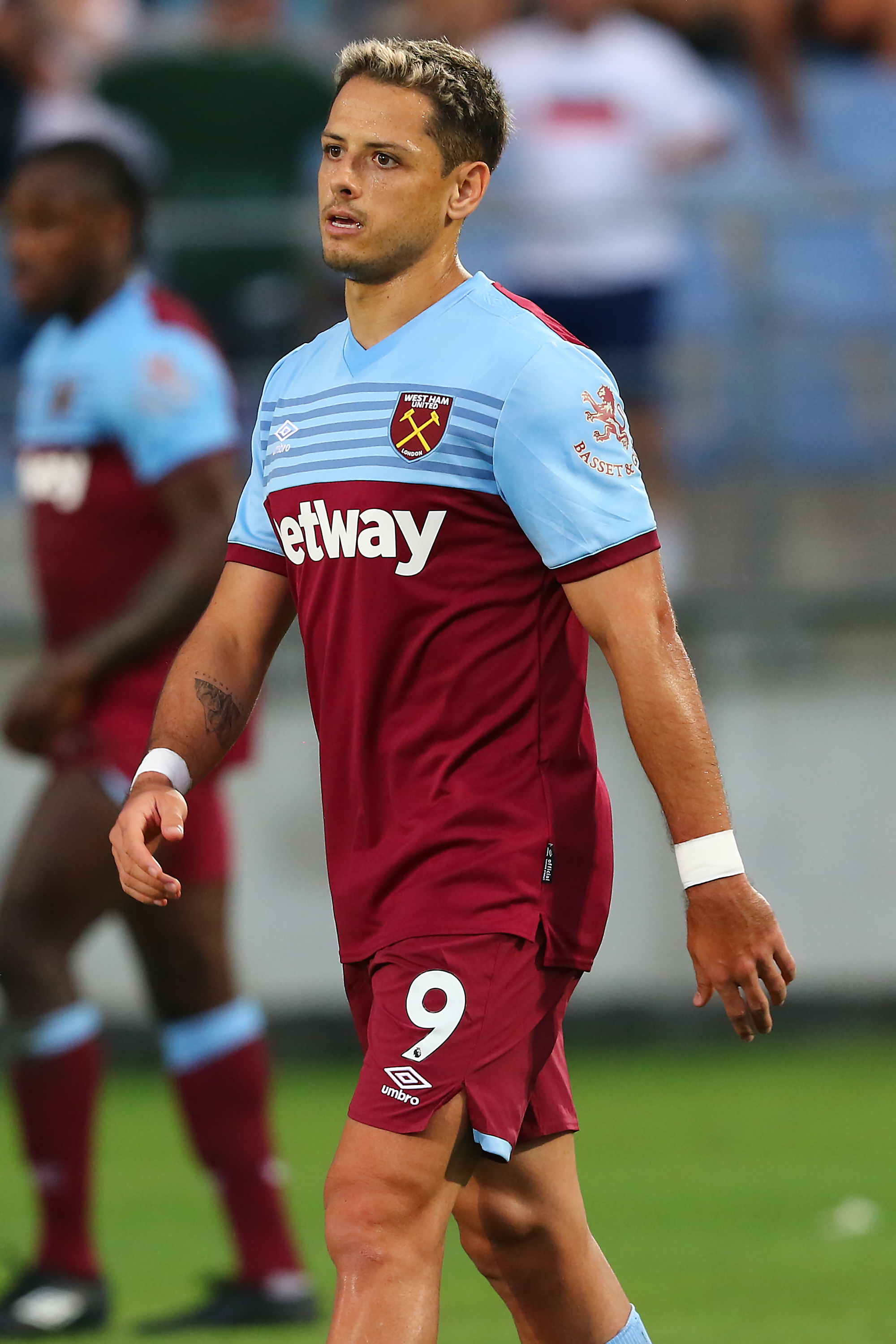
Hernández playing for West Ham United in 2019

On 28 August 2018, Hernández scored West Ham's third goal in injury time of a 3–1 victory over AFC Wimbledon in the second round of the EFL Cup. In September, West Ham manager Manuel Pellegrini declared that Hernández was suffering from glandular fever, causing him to miss out various matches. He would recover and return to training in October. On 3 November, he scored his first Premier League goal of the season in West Ham's 4–2 victory over Burnley.

On 22 February 2019, Hernández scored the equalising goal in West Ham's eventual 3–1 win over Fulham; on initial viewing, it looked like he had headed the ball in from a yard to score, however replays of the goal appeared to show the ball rebound off of Hernández's arm to put the ball into the net. It was also his 50th career Premier League goal, becoming the first Mexican to reach the milestone. He would get on the scoresheet again on 16 March, coming on as a second-half substitute and scoring twice—including the stoppage-time winner—to secure a 4–3 league victory over Huddersfield.

Prior to the start of the 19–20 season, he was given the number 9 shirt. Hernández scored his first goal of the 2019–20 Premier League season on 17 August as West Ham drew 1–1 with Brighton at Falmer Stadium. On 30 August, Hernández handed in a transfer request to West Ham and flew to Spain to complete a medical ahead of a proposed €8 million move to Sevilla.

=== Sevilla ===
On 2 September, Hernández joined La Liga club Sevilla for an undisclosed fee, reported to be £7.3m, signing a three-year contract. He made his league debut on 15 September in an away match against Alavés, coming on as a 70th-minute substitute in Sevilla's 1–0 win. Four days later, in a Europa League group stage match against Azerbaijani side Qarabağ FK, Hernández scored a free kick, the first in his career, in his side's 3–0 victory. Despite only spending half a season in Seville, he won his first continental title, the 19-20 Europa League as he had featured in the group stages. On 27 October, he scored his first goal in La Liga with Sevilla in a 2–0 victory against Getafe. With his playing time limited, he choose to leave Europe for a new challenge and be closer to his family in Mexico.

=== LA Galaxy ===
On 21 January 2020, Hernández signed a three-year contract with Major League Soccer club LA Galaxy, and became the highest paid player in the league. He was brought in as a replacement for Zlatan Ibrahimović, who had joined AC Milan. He was named captain for the upcoming season. On 29 February, he made his MLS debut in the season opener against Houston Dynamo in 1–1 draw, playing the entirety of the match. On July 13, he scored his first goal for the club against Portland Timbers which ended in a 2–1 loss. He ended his first season with 12 appearances and 2 goals.

In the first game of his second season, on 18 April 2021, playing against Inter Miami, he scored twice for a 3–2 victory. The following matchweek, he scored a hat-trick against New York Red Bulls for another 3–2 victory. His performances led him to win the Player of the Month award for April/May. He was included in the roster for the 2021 MLS All-Star Game, but withdrew due to injury. He finished the season as the league's joint-third goalscorer and as the club's top scorer with 17 goals in 21 appearances. He was named the club's Player of the Year and was also a finalist for that season's Comeback Player of the Year.

In the first game of his third season, on 27 February 2022, Hernández scored the only goal in a victory over New York City FC. Hernández was chosen to participate at the 2022 MLS All-Star Game, where he was named captain. After scoring 12 goals and playing 60% of games as a starter, his contract automatically renewed for an additional year. Hernández ended the 2022 season as the league's joint-fourth goalscorer and the club's top scorer with 18 goals in 32 appearances. As the team finished in fourth place of the Western Conference, it qualified for the MLS Cup Playoffs, where they were eliminated in the Western Conference Semifinals against rivals Los Angeles FC. His performances led him to win a second Player of the Year award. He was also on the shortlist for that season's MVP Award.

During the club's 7 June quarterfinal match against Real Salt Lake in the 2023 U.S. Open Cup, Hernández suffered a torn ACL, ending his 2023 season. He left the club on 3 November.

=== Return to C.D. Guadalajara ===
On 24 January 2024, Hernández returned to Mexico, as he signed a two-year contract, with an option for an additional year, with Guadalajara (Chivas), the club where he began his professional career in 2006.

One month after rejoining his former club, Hernández made his debut against Pumas UNAM, when he came off the bench in the 88th minute. Hernández scored his first goal of the tournament in a match against Puebla, the first in a 3–2 victory. His return to Chivas has not gone well, due to poor form, fitness challenges and disciplinary issues that have led to reprimands from both club and national boards.

On 11 December 2025, the Guadalajara board announced the departure of Hernández from the club, since the player's contract was ending and it was decided not to renew it.

=== Atlético Dallas ===
On 27 July 2026, Hernández signed for USL Championship club Atlético Dallas, becoming the first player ever to join the club.

== International career ==
=== Youth ===
Hernández was set to play with the under-17 team in the 2005 FIFA U-17 World Championship, but an injury sidelined him from the team that ultimately won the championship. Two years later, he was one of the 21 players called up to the under-20 side for the 2007 FIFA U-20 World Cup in Canada. He came on as a late substitute in the opening game against Gambia and scored the final goal in Mexico's 3–0 victory.

=== Senior ===
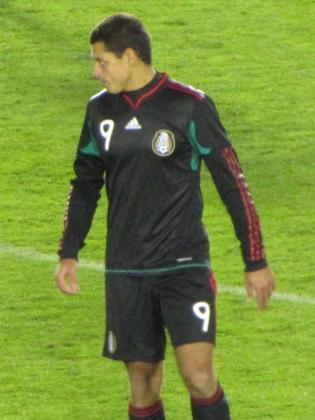
Hernández playing for Mexico in 2010

On 30 September 2009, under Javier Aguirre, Hernández made his senior national team debut against Colombia, where he made an assist in a 2–1 loss. On 24 February 2010, Hernández scored two goals against Bolivia and had an assist for Braulio Luna's goal. On 3 March, Hernández scored a header against New Zealand, giving Mexico the lead in a 2–0 victory. On 17 March, Hernández scored his fourth international goal to give Mexico a 2–1 victory over North Korea. On 26 May, he scored a consolation header against the Netherlands in a 2–1 loss. On 30 May, Hernández scored yet again, netting twice in a 5–1 victory over Gambia.

==== 2010 FIFA World Cup ====
On 11 June, Hernández made his FIFA World Cup debut during the opening game of the 2010 tournament against South Africa in a 1–1 draw, coming on in the 73rd minute to replace Guillermo Franco. On 17 June, Hernández again came off the bench and this time scored his first ever World Cup goal, netting the first in a 2–0 victory over France by springing the offside trap, latching onto a through ball from Rafael Márquez, sidestepping Hugo Lloris and sidefooting into the net. By scoring he emulated his grandfather, Tomás Balcázar, who scored against France in the 1954 World Cup. He was elected as man of the match. It was also the 2,100th goal scored in all World Cup tournaments. On 27 June, Hernández made his first start at a World Cup and netted his second goal of the World Cup, by turning Martín Demichelis on the edge of the box before sending a left-foot shot into the roof of the net, in Mexico's 3–1 loss against Argentina in the round of 16. FIFA's statistical analysis showed that Hernández was the quickest player in the tournament, reaching a top speed of 32.15 km/h (20 mph).

==== Post-World Cup friendlies ====
Hernández scored another goal in his first match for Mexico since the World Cup, in a friendly against recent 2010 FIFA World Cup winners Spain on 11 August 2010. He scored after just 12 minutes of the match, but David Silva equalised for Spain in the last minute of play to claim a 1–1 draw. Hernández scored his and Mexico's first international goal of 2011 as he opened the scoring in a 2–0 win over Bosnia and Herzegovina on 9 February. On 26 March, Hernández scored two goals in an international friendly against Paraguay. He first connected with a pass from Pablo Barrera in the sixth minute of the match, before scoring off a low cross in the 29th minute, three minutes after teammate Andrés Guardado had made the score 2–0. He exited to a standing ovation in the 65th minute.

==== 2011 CONCACAF Gold Cup ====
On 5 June 2011, after being called up by José Manuel de la Torre, he scored a hat-trick, the first in his career, in a 5–0 win against El Salvador. On 9 June, he scored two goals, in the 36th and 76th minutes against Cuba. On 18 June, Hernández scored the winner in a 2–1 win over Guatemala to send Mexico to the semi-finals. On 22 June, he helped Mexico reach the Gold Cup Final after a 2–0 win over Honduras in extra-time, where he scored Mexico's second goal in the 99th minute. Hernández helped his team to a 4–2 victory in the final against the United States. He was the Gold Cup's top scorer with seven goals and was named the most valuable player of the tournament.

Hernández was blocked from participating at the 2012 Summer Olympics.

==== 2013 FIFA Confederations Cup ====
Hernández was selected in Mexico's squad for the 2013 FIFA Confederations Cup. On 16 June, he scored via penalty kick in the team's opening match, a 2–1 defeat to Italy at the Estádio do Maracanã. In the final group match, Hernández scored both goals as El Tri defeated Japan 2–1.

==== 2014 FIFA World Cup ====
Hernández scored five times for Mexico during qualification for the 2014 FIFA World Cup. On 23 June, called up by Miguel Herrera, Hernández scored Mexico's third goal against Croatia in their 3–1 victory after coming on as a substitute at Arena Pernambuco to qualify the team for the round of 16.

==== 2015 CONCACAF Cup ====
On 1 July 2015, Hernández sustained a broken collar bone during a friendly match against Honduras, ruling him out of the that year's CONCACAF Gold Cup, which Mexico went on to win.

In October, Hernández was called up by interim manager Ricardo Ferretti for the CONCACAF Cup – a play-off match to determine CONCACAF's entry into the 2017 FIFA Confederations Cup – against the United States. Mexico defeated the United States 3–2 after extra time at the Rose Bowl, with Hernández opening the score after ten minutes.

==== 2016–2018: Copa América Centenario and milestones ====
Hernández was included by Juan Carlos Osorio to be in Mexico's 23-man squad that would participate in the Copa América Centenario tournament. On 5 June 2016, he played 83 minutes in the 3–1 victory over Uruguay, and scored the first goal in Mexico's 2–0 win over Jamaica. The goal took Hernández's tally to 45, one goal shy of tying Jared Borgetti's national team record.

On 12 May 2017, Hernández was included in the national squad that would play in the FIFA Confederations Cup in Russia. On 27 May, Hernández became Mexico's all-time top goalscorer with 47 goals when he scored in a friendly against Croatia. In Mexico's Confederations Cup debut, he scored Mexico's first goal in an eventual 2–2 draw against Portugal on 18 June, scoring a low header from a Carlos Vela cross.

On 27 March 2018, Hernández earned his 100th cap in a friendly match against Croatia.

==== 2018 FIFA World Cup ====
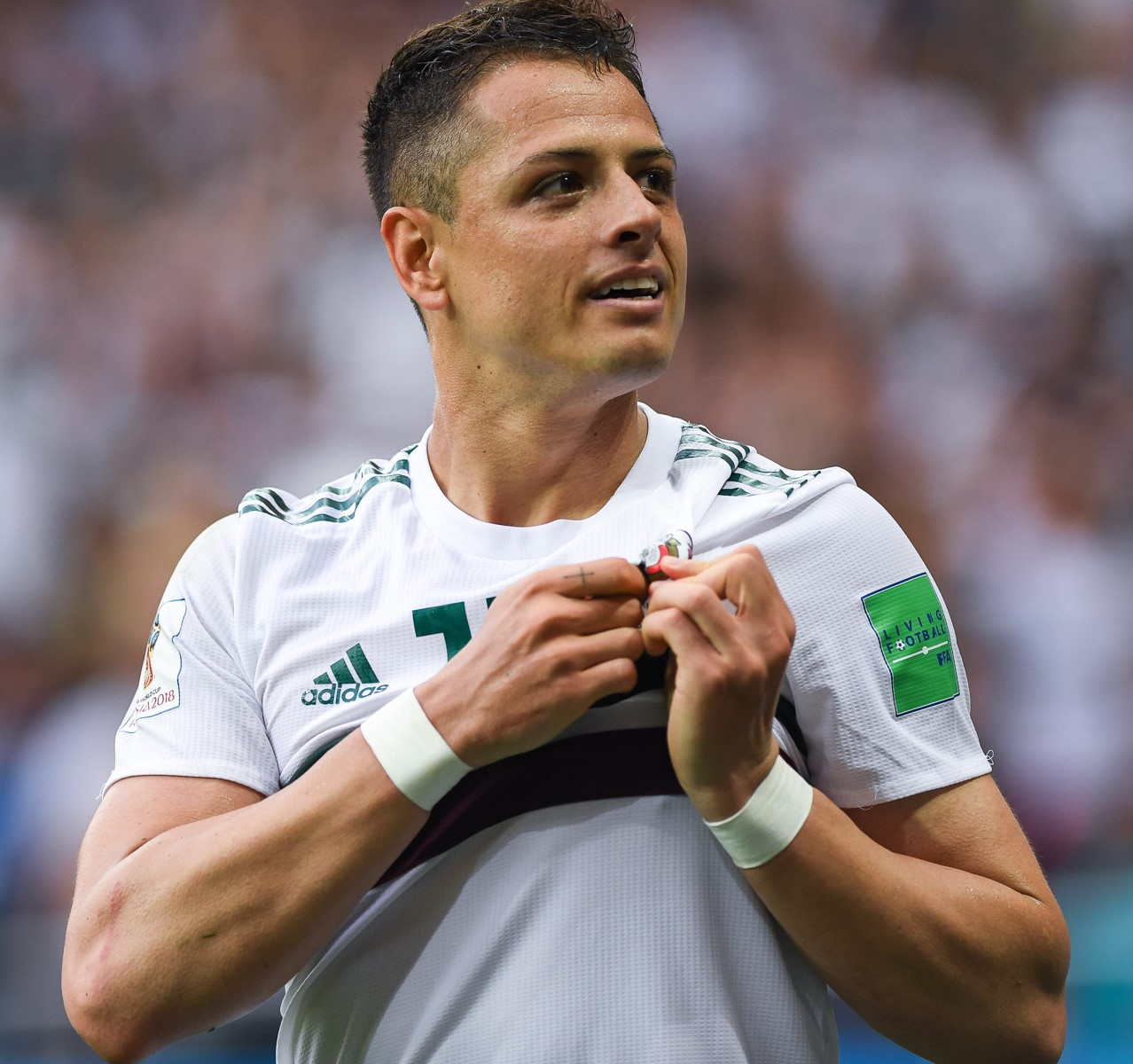
Hernández playing for Mexico at the 2018 World Cup

Hernández scored three times for Mexico during qualification for the 2018 FIFA World Cup. He was in the starting lineup in Mexico's first World Cup game against Germany at the Luzhniki Stadium in Moscow and made an assist to Hirving Lozano to go on to win the match 1–0. In the second group game Hernández scored Mexico's second goal, his 50th international goal, in their 2–1 win over South Korea, and was named FIFA Man of the Match. With his goal, Hernández became the joint-highest scoring Mexican player at the World Cup with four goals, tied with Luis Hernández, and the third Mexican player to score in three World Cups. He went on to start in the final group stage match against Sweden, as well as in the round of 16 loss to Brazil.

Hernández requested Gerardo Martino to not be included in the 2019 CONCACAF Gold Cup for personal reasons.

Hernández was included in the provisional roster for the 2021 CONCACAF Gold Cup but did not make the final list.

Despite his domestic form, Hernández was not included in the squad for the 2022 FIFA World Cup in Qatar.

== Style of play ==
A clinical goalscorer, Hernández has been described as a "goal-poacher" due to a number of his goals being scored from close range. His movement off the ball, pace, and ability to find space inside the box has also been praised. He has been described as one of the few players who seem capable of appearing behind a defender's back to knock in the ball from two yards, with his playing style being compared to that of German striker Miroslav Klose.

Rudi Völler, sporting director of Bayer Leverkusen, praised Hernández for his keen positioning in front of the goal, saying: "he certainly doesn't win every tackle, but he has an incredible sense of where the ball will end up". Former Manchester United manager Sir Alex Ferguson described Hernández as two-footed, very quick, in possession of a good spring, and a natural goalscorer. Ferguson also said Hernández's style reminded him of former United striker Ole Gunnar Solskjær – the so-called "baby-faced assassin" who scored the injury time winner against Bayern Munich in United's 1999 Champions League triumph. Hernández's former teammate Jesús Padilla described him as "amazing in the air" despite his height. Due to his small stature, he is very quick and agile, also possessing good technique. Since he often came on as a substitute at United, Hernández's minutes per goal ratio is among the most prolific in the history of the Premier League.

In a May 2016 interview with Sports Illustrated, Hernández commented on his abilities inside the penalty area, describing the intuition he has in knowing where an impending cross will fall from a teammate and outsmarting opposing defenders. Former Mexico national team coach Juan Carlos Osorio described Hernández as having "a knack for the goal. Sometimes, it seems like every rebound or every deflection goes into his path. Another thing is he doesn't dwell on a missed opportunity. He always looks forward to the next one. He has good ability in the air. He has a good pace and makes those diagonal runs, starting from the first defender and then going behind the second one. He also has the willingness to work defensively."

== Esports career ==
On 20 April 2022, Hernández signed with Complexity Gaming to play Call of Duty.

== Personal life ==
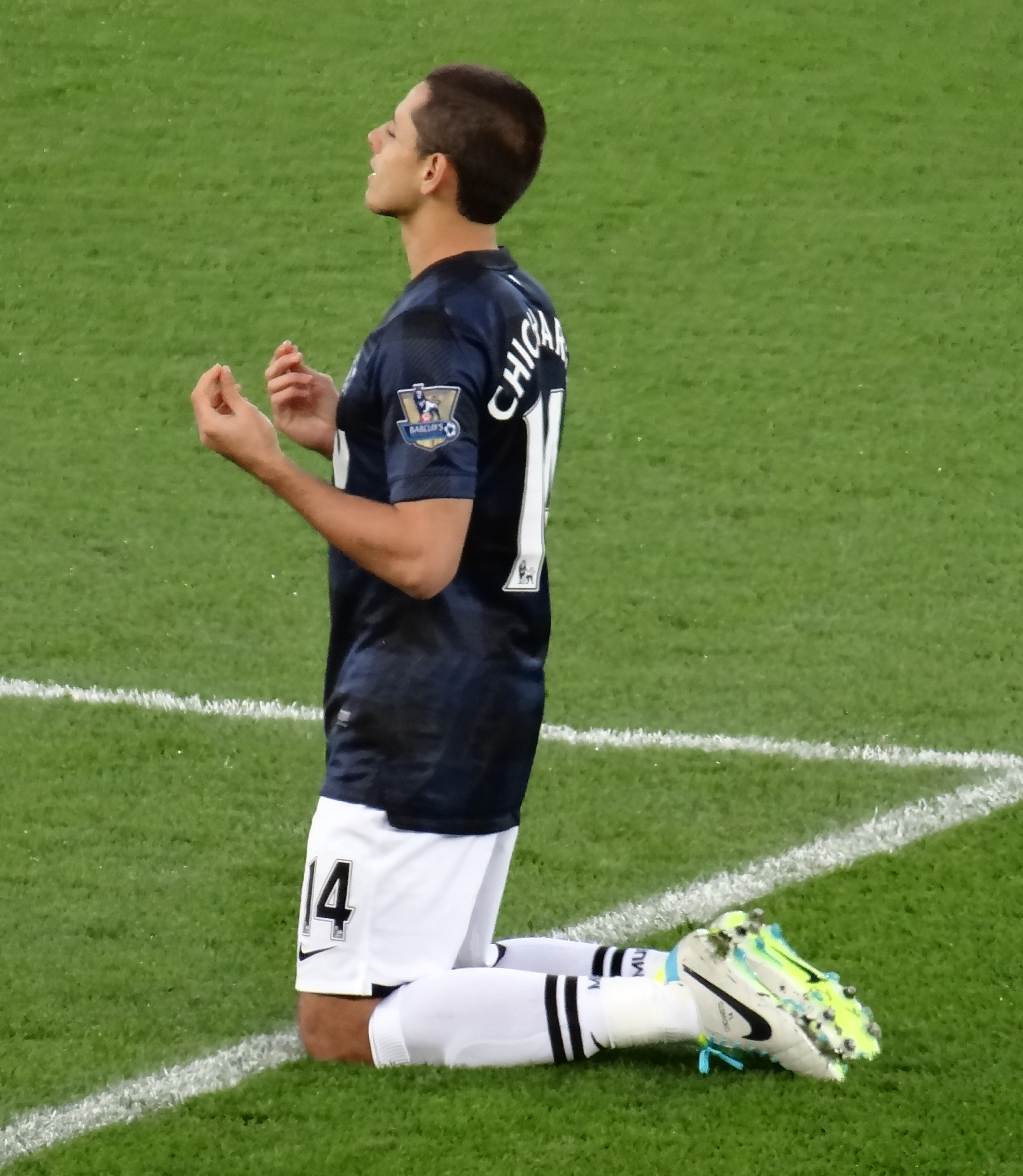
Hernández conducting his pre-match prayer before a match against Cardiff City in November 2013

Hernández is the son of Javier Hernández Gutiérrez, who played for three clubs in Mexico and was a member of the Mexico squad at the 1986 FIFA World Cup. Hernández Gutiérrez quit his job as manager of Guadalajara's reserve side in order to watch Hernández play in the 2010 World Cup in South Africa. Hernández is also the grandson of Tomás Balcázar, who also played for Guadalajara and played for the national side in the 1954 FIFA World Cup.

On 26 May 2012, Hernández became the Mexican ambassador for UNICEF, making him the third Mexican to serve this position, following César Costa and Julieta Venegas in 2004 and 2009 respectively. As ambassador, he will participate in a number of activities to encourage children and teenagers to not abandon their education. He was commemorated in a news conference, where he said he felt "proud and committed".

Hernández is a devout Roman Catholic. He is well known for his pre-game ritual where he gets on his knees and prays which he performs before most games.

Hernández was featured on the North American cover of FIFA 14 and the Mexican cover of FIFA 15, alongside global cover star Lionel Messi in both titles.

Hernández is an "honorary associate" of the Asociación Mexicana de Futbolistas (Mexican Footballers Association), created in October 2017.

In January 2019, Hernández and his then wife Sarah Kohan, an Australian model of Romanian descent and travel blogger, announced on Instagram that they were expecting their first child. On 16 June 2019, their son, Noah, was born. One year later on 5 October 2020, their daughter, Nala, was born.

Hernández is good friends with fellow Guadalajara natives, Canelo Álvarez, Checo Pérez, and Marco Fabián.

In July 2025, Hernández was fined and warned by the Mexican Football Federation after he made a series of sexist remarks on social media that was widely criticized, including by Mexican president Claudia Sheinbaum. He subsequently expressed regret.

=== Nickname ===
Hernández is commonly known as Chicharito, meaning little pea in Spanish, and wears the name on his shirt. This is due to his father, Javier Hernández Gutiérrez, being nicknamed Chícharo (pea) because of his green eyes.

== Career statistics ==
=== Club ===
As of match played 30 November 2025

Appearances and goals by club, season and competition
Club	Season	League			National cup (Note: Includes InterLiga, FA Cup, DFB-Pokal, Copa del Rey and U.S. Open Cup)		League cup (Note: Includes Football League/EFL Cup)		Continental		Other		Total	
Club	Season	Division	Apps	Goals	Apps	Goals	Apps	Goals	Apps	Goals	Apps	Goals	Apps	Goals
Guadalajara	2006–07	Mexican Primera División	8	1	—		—		2 (Note: One appearance in CONCACAF Champions Cup, one appearance in Copa Sudamericana)	0	—		10	1
Guadalajara	2007–08	Mexican Primera División	6	0	—		—		5 (Note: Three appearances in Copa Libertadores, one appearance in Copa Sudamericana, one appearance in North American SuperLiga)	0	—		11	0
Guadalajara	2008–09	Mexican Primera División	22	4	3	0	—		6 (Note: Five appearances in Copa Libertadores, one appearance North American SuperLiga)	3	—		31	7
Guadalajara	2009–10	Mexican Primera División	28	21	—		—		0	0	—		28	21
Guadalajara	Total		64	26	3	0	—		13	3	—		80	29
Manchester United	2010–11	Premier League	27	13	5	1	3	1	9 (Note: Appearances in UEFA Champions League)	4	1 (Note: Appearance in FA Community Shield)	1	45	20
Manchester United	2011–12	Premier League	28	10	1	0	0	0	7 (Note: Four appearances in UEFA Champions League, three appearances and two goals in UEFA Europa League)	2	0	0	36	12
Manchester United	2012–13	Premier League	22	10	6	4	2	1	6	3	—		36	18
Manchester United	2013–14	Premier League	24	4	1	1	5	4	5	0	0	0	35	9
Manchester United	2014–15	Premier League	1	0	—		1	0	—		—		2	0
Manchester United	2015–16	Premier League	1	0	—		—		2	0	—		3	0
Manchester United	Total		103	37	13	6	11	6	29	9	1	1	157	59
Real Madrid (loan)	2014–15	La Liga	23	7	2	1	—		8	1	—		33	9
Bayer Leverkusen	2015–16	Bundesliga	28	17	3	4	—		9 (Note: Six appearances and five goals in UEFA Champions League, three appearances in UEFA Europa League)	5	—		40	26
Bayer Leverkusen	2016–17	Bundesliga	26	11	2	1	—		8	1	—		36	13
Bayer Leverkusen	Total		54	28	5	5	—		17	6	—		76	39
West Ham United	2017–18	Premier League	28	8	2	0	3	0	—		—		33	8
West Ham United	2018–19	Premier League	25	7	1	0	2	1	—		—		28	8
West Ham United	2019–20	Premier League	2	1	—		—		—		—		2	1
West Ham United	Total		55	16	3	0	5	1	—		—		63	17
Sevilla	2019–20	La Liga	9	1	2	0	—		4 (Note: Appearances in UEFA Europa League)	2	—		15	3
LA Galaxy	2020	MLS	12	2	—		—		—		—		12	2
LA Galaxy	2021	MLS	21	17	—		—		—		—		21	17
LA Galaxy	2022	MLS	32	18	3	1	—		—		2 (Note: Appearances in MLS Cup Playoffs)	0	37	19
LA Galaxy	2023	MLS	9	1	3	0	—		—		—		12	1
LA Galaxy	Total		74	38	6	1	—		—		2	0	82	39
Guadalajara	2023–24	Liga MX	10	1	—		—		2 (Note: Appearances in CONCACAF Champions Cup)	0	0	0	12	1
Guadalajara	2024–25	Liga MX	18	1	—		—		4	1	0	0	22	2
Guadalajara	2025–26	Liga MX	7	1	—		—		—		—		7	1
Guadalajara	Total		35	3	—		—		6	1	—		41	4
Career total			417	156	34	13	16	7	77	22	3	1	547	199

=== International ===
As of match played 7 September 2019

Appearances and goals by national team and year
National team	Year	Apps	Goals
Mexico	2009	1	0
Mexico	2010	19	11
Mexico	2011	13	12
Mexico	2012	10	5
Mexico	2013	14	7
Mexico	2014	13	3
Mexico	2015	8	4
Mexico	2016	10	3
Mexico	2017	11	4
Mexico	2018	7	1
Mexico	2019	3	2
Total		109	52

== Honours ==
Guadalajara

- Mexican Primera División: Apertura 2006
- InterLiga: 2009
- Copa Libertadores runner-up: 2010

Manchester United

- Premier League: 2010–11, 2012–13
- FA Community Shield: 2010
- UEFA Champions League runner-up: 2010–11

Real Madrid

- FIFA Club World Cup: 2014

Sevilla

- UEFA Europa League: 2019–20

Mexico

- CONCACAF Gold Cup: 2011
- CONCACAF Cup: 2015

Individual

- Mexican Primera División Best Forward: Bicentenario 2010
- Mexican Primera División Golden Boot: Bicentenario 2010 (Shared)
- Manchester United Player of the Month: October 2010, January 2011, April 2011, October 2011, October 2012, November 2012
- Sir Matt Busby Player of the Year: 2010–11
- CONCACAF Gold Cup Golden Boot: 2011
- CONCACAF Gold Cup MVP: 2011
- CONCACAF Gold Cup Best Goal: 2011 (fourth place)
- IFFHS World Goalgetter: 2011
- IFFHS CONCACAF Most Popular Player: 2011
- La Liga Goal of the Month: September 2014
- Bundesliga Player of the Month: November 2015, December 2015, January 2016, September 2016, February 2017
- Bundesliga Idol: 2015
- CONCACAF Men's Player of the Year: 2015
- CONCACAF Best XI: 2015
- Bundesliga Team of the Season: 2015–16
- Bundesliga Best Goal by a Latino in History
- Premio Nacional del Deporte: 2017
- Bundesliga Latino Team of the Decade: 2010–2019
- IFFHS CONCACAF Men's Team of the Decade: 2011–2020
- MLS Player of the Month: April 2021/May 2021
- LA Galaxy Goal of the Month: April 2021, September 2021, February 2022, April 2022
- LA Galaxy Player of the Year: 2021, 2022
- LA Galaxy Golden Boot: 2021, 2022
- LA Galaxy Player of the Month: February 2022, August 2022
- MLS All-Star: 2022

Records

- Mexico all-time top goalscorer: 52

== See also ==
- List of top international men's football goalscorers by country
- List of men's footballers with 100 or more international caps
- List of men's footballers with 50 or more international goals
