= Johnny Squires =

Republic of Ireland footballer

Personal information
- Full name: John Squires
- Position: Forward

Senior career*
| Years | Team | Apps | (Gls) |
| ????–1934 | Shelbourne | | |
| 1934–37 | Dolphin | | |
| 1937 | Dundalk | 7 | (1) |
| 1937–39 | Drumcondra | | |
| 1939-40 | Brideville F.C. | | |
- Linfield

International career
| 1934 | Republic of Ireland | 1 | (1) |
- * Club domestic league appearances and goals

Johnny Squires was a Republic of Ireland international footballer.

A forward, Squires was capped once for the Republic of Ireland at senior level. He made his debut scoring in a 5–2 defeat to the Netherlands on 8 April 1934, thus becoming the first Irish player to score in an away fixture in the World Cup.

== Honours ==
Dolphin

- League of Ireland
  - Winners: 1934–35: 1
