= Ernest Mengel =

Luxembourgish footballer

Personal information
- Date of birth: 27 March 1913
- Place of birth: Dudelange, Luxembourg
- Date of death: 16 December 1968 (aged 55)
- Place of death: Dudelange, Luxembourg

International career
Years	Team	Apps	(Gls)
- Luxembourg

Ernest Mengel (27 March 1913 – 16 December 1968) was a Luxembourgish footballer. He competed in the men's tournament at the 1936 Summer Olympics.
