= Laurent Grimmonprez =

Belgian footballer

Laurent Georges Grimmonprez

Personal information
- Date of birth: 14 December 1902
- Place of birth: Gentbrugge, Ghent (Belgium)
- Date of death: 22 May 1984 (aged 81)
- Place of death: (Belgium)
- Positions: Striker; midfielder

Senior career*
Years	Team	Apps	(Gls)
1920–1943	Racing Club Ghent		

International career
1924–1934	Belgium	10	(1)
- * Club domestic league appearances and goals

Laurent Georges Grimmonprez known as Flokke Grimmonprez (14 December 1902 in Gentbrugge, Ghent, Belgium – 22 May 1984) was a Belgian footballer. He played as a striker and inside-right for Royal Racing Club de Gand during the interwar period.

Grimmonprez played 10 games and scored one goal for the Diables Rouges. He was picked for the Olympic Games in 1924 in France and played in the World Cup in 1934 in Italy.

== Honours ==
- International from 1924 to 1934 (10 caps and 1 goal)
- Picked for the Olympic Games in 1924 (did not play)
- Participation in the 1934 World Cup (played 1 match)
- Top scorer in the Belgian First Division in 1926 (28 goals)
- Top scorer in the Belgian Second Division in 1931 (? goals)
