= Tomás Balcázar =

Mexican footballer (1931–2020)

Personal information
- Full name: Tomás Balcázar González
- Date of birth: 4 May 1931
- Place of birth: Guadalajara, Jalisco, Mexico
- Date of death: 26 April 2020 (aged 88)
- Place of death: Guadalajara, Jalisco, Mexico
- Height: 1.77 m (5 ft 10 in)
- Position: Forward

Senior career*
Years	Team	Apps	(Gls)
1948–1958	Guadalajara	346	(23)

International career
1953–1954	Mexico	11	(6)
- * Club domestic league appearances and goals

Tomás Balcázar González (4 May 1931 – 26 April 2020) was a Mexican professional footballer who played as a forward. He played at club level for Guadalajara, and internationally for Mexico.

== Football career ==
Balcázar was a legend in Mexico for being in the campeonísimo, which refers to the historic Guadalajara team that won 8 championships in 10 years.

== International career ==
In the 1954 FIFA World Cup, Balcázar scored for Mexico against France. When he scored that goal, Balcázar was 22 years old, the same age his grandson Javier Hernández was during the 2010 FIFA World Cup when he scored against the French on 17 June 2010.

== Personal life ==
Balcázar was the maternal grandfather of Javier Hernández Balcázar (Chicharito), a Mexican footballer who is the all-time top scorer for Mexico. Balcázar was the father-in-law of Javier Hernández Gutiérrez, who played for Tecos and was a member of the Mexico squad at the 1986 FIFA World Cup. On 5 June he married Berta Calloino in Mexico City.
