= Parque Necaxa =

Mexican multi-use stadium

- Interactive map of Parque Necaxa
- Full name: Parque Necaxa
- Location: Mexico City, Mexico
- Coordinates: 32.6647°N 115.4573°W
- Owner: Club Necaxa
- Operator: Club Necaxa
- Capacity: 22,000

Construction
- Opened: September 14, 1930
- Closed: 1955

Tenant
- Club Necaxa

Parque Necaxa was a multi-use stadium in Mexico City, Mexico. It was initially used as the stadium of Club Necaxa matches. It was replaced by Estadio Ciudad de los Deportes in 1950. The capacity of the stadium was 22,000 spectators.
