= List of United States men's international soccer players =

The following tables include various statistics for players on the United States men's national soccer team (featuring all caps, goals, assists and goalkeeper wins and shutouts) from the team's first match in 1916 through the November 17, 2026 game against Haiti. As of September 2026, a total of 904 players have made at least one appearance for the United States men's national team.

== Appearances ==
Players capped since 2025 are shown in bold.

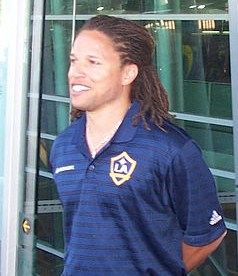
Cobi Jones played 164 matches for the United States between 1992 and 2004

Rank	Player	Caps	Goals	Years
1	Cobi Jones	164	15	1992–2004
2	Landon Donovan	157	57	2000–2014
3	Michael Bradley	151	17	2006–2019
4	Clint Dempsey	141	57	2004–2017
5	Jeff Agoos	134	4	1988–2003
6	Marcelo Balboa	127	13	1988–2000
7	DaMarcus Beasley	126	17	2001–2017
8	Tim Howard	121	0	2002–2017
9	Jozy Altidore	115	42	2007–2019
10	Claudio Reyna	112	8	1994–2006
11	Carlos Bocanegra	110	14	2001–2012
11	Paul Caligiuri	110	5	1984–1997
13	Eric Wynalda	106	34	1990–2000
14	Kasey Keller	102	0	1990–2007
15	Earnie Stewart	101	17	1990–2004
16	Joe-Max Moore	100	24	1992–2002
16	Tony Meola	100	0	1988–2006
18	Alexi Lalas	96	9	1991–1998
19	Brian McBride	95	30	1993–2006
20	**Christian Pulisic**	92	36	2016–
21	John Harkes	90	6	1987–2000
22	Steve Cherundolo	87	2	1999–2012
23	**Tim Ream**	86	1	2010–
24	Bruce Murray	85	21	1985–1993
24	Frankie Hejduk	85	7	1996–2009
26	Eddie Lewis	82	10	1996–2008
26	Eddie Pope	82	8	1996–2006
26	Brad Friedel	82	0	1992–2004
29	Tab Ramos	81	8	1988–2000
29	Thomas Dooley	81	7	1992–1999
29	Desmond Armstrong	81	0	1987–1994
29	DeAndre Yedlin	81	0	2014–2023
33	Chris Henderson	79	3	1990–2001
34	Mike Burns	75	0	1992–1998
35	**Weston McKennie**	73	13	2017–
35	Hugo Pérez	73	13	1984–1994
37	Oguchi Onyewu	69	6	2004–2014
37	Jermaine Jones	69	4	2010–2017
39	Gyasi Zardes	67	14	2015–2022
39	Mike Sorber	67	2	1992–1998
41	Peter Vermes	66	11	1988–1997
41	Chris Armas	66	2	1998–2005
41	Alejandro Bedoya	66	2	2010–2017
44	Pablo Mastroeni	65	0	2001–2009
45	**Antonee Robinson**	64	5	2018–
45	**Tyler Adams**	64	2	2017–
45	Brad Guzan	64	0	2006–2019
48	Eddie Johnson	63	19	2004–2014
49	Jovan Kirovski	62	9	1994–2004
50	Fernando Clavijo	61	0	1990–1994
51	**Brenden Aaronson**	59	9	2020–
52	Kellyn Acosta	58	2	2016–2023
52	Kyle Beckerman	58	1	2007–2016
54	Fabian Johnson	57	2	2011–2017
55	Jordan Morris	55	11	2014–2023
55	Geoff Cameron	55	4	2010–2017
55	**Matt Turner**	55	0	2021–
58	Dominic Kinnear	54	9	1990–1994
58	Graham Zusi	54	5	2012–2017
60	**Timothy Weah**	53	7	2018–
60	John Doyle	53	3	1987–1994
62	Josh Wolff	52	9	1999–2008
62	Sacha Kljestan	52	6	2007–2017
62	Omar Gonzalez	52	3	2010–2019
65	Paul Arriola	50	10	2016–2023
65	**Yunus Musah**	50	1	2020–
65	Mike Windischmann	50	0	1984–1990
68	Brian Quinn	48	1	1991–1994
69	**Giovanni Reyna**	47	10	2020–
69	Matt Besler	47	1	2013–2017
69	**Cristian Roldan**	47	0	2017–
72	Clint Mathis	46	12	1998–2005
72	Clarence Goodson	46	5	2008–2014
72	**Sergiño Dest**	46	3	2019–
72	**Walker Zimmerman**	46	3	2017–2025
72	Bobby Convey	46	1	2000–2008
72	Maurice Edu	46	1	2007–2014
78	Bobby Wood	45	13	2013–2018
78	Brian Ching	45	11	2003–2010
78	**Chris Richards**	45	4	2020–
78	John Brooks	45	3	2013–2021
82	Benny Feilhaber	44	2	2007–2017
82	Janusz Michallik	44	1	1991–1994
82	Gregg Berhalter	44	0	1994–2006
85	**Miles Robinson**	43	3	2019–
85	Tony Sanneh	43	3	1997–2005
85	Mike Lapper	43	1	1991–1995
88	**Ricardo Pepi**	42	13	2021–
89	**Malik Tillman**	41	7	2022–
89	Roy Wegerle	41	7	1992–1998
91	Frank Klopas	39	12	1987–1998
92	Mix Diskerud	38	6	2010–2016
92	Jonathan Bornstein	38	2	2007–2011
94	Ben Olsen	37	6	1998–2007
94	Steve Trittschuh	37	2	1987–1995
94	Greg Vanney	37	1	1996–2005
97	Steve Ralston	36	4	1997–2007
97	Jimmy Banks	36	0	1985–1991
97	Jonathan Spector	36	0	2004–2015
100	Chris Wondolowski	35	11	2011–2016
100	Rick Davis	35	7	1977–1988
100	Aaron Long	35	3	2018–2023
100	Arnie Mausser	35	0	1975–1985
100	Heath Pearce	35	0	2005–2012
105	Brek Shea	34	4	2010–2015
105	Ricardo Clark	34	3	2005–2012
107	**Folarin Balogun**	33	13	2023–
107	Sebastian Lletget	33	8	2017–2021
107	Boris Bandov	33	2	1976–1983
107	Brian Bliss	33	2	1984–1995
111	John O'Brien	32	3	1998–2006
111	**Luca de la Torre**	32	1	2018–2025
113	John Stollmeyer	31	0	1986–1990
114	Taylor Twellman	30	6	2002–2008
114	Roy Lassiter	30	4	1992–2000
114	**Mark McKenzie**	30	0	2020–
114	**Zack Steffen**	30	0	2018–2025
118	**Josh Sargent**	29	5	2018–2025
118	Eric Eichmann	29	4	1986–1993
118	Michael Orozco	29	4	2008–2016
118	Timothy Chandler	29	1	2011–2016
118	Carlos Llamosa	29	0	1998–2002
123	Preki Radosavljević	28	4	1996–2001
123	Juan Agudelo	28	3	2010–2017
123	**Alex Freeman**	28	3	2025–
123	Reggie Cannon	28	1	2018–2022
123	Jimmy Conrad	28	1	2005–2010
123	Matt Miazga	28	1	2015–2023
123	**Joe Scally**	28	0	2022–
130	Brad Evans	27	1	2009–2017
130	David Regis	27	0	1998–2002
132	Robin Fraser	26	0	1988–2001
132	José Francisco Torres	26	0	2008–2013
134	Ante Razov	25	6	1995–2007
134	Stuart Holden	25	3	2009–2013
134	Darlington Nagbe	25	1	2015–2018
134	Jay DeMerit	25	0	2007–2011
134	Michael Parkhurst	25	0	2007–2014
139	Herculez Gomez	24	6	2007–2013
139	**Sebastian Berhalter**	24	4	2025–
139	Mark Chung	24	2	1991–1998
139	Paul Krumpe	24	1	1986–1991
143	Jesús Ferreira	23	15	2020–2023
143	Joe Corona	23	3	2012–2018
143	Perry Van der Beck	23	2	1979–1985
143	Danny Williams	23	2	2011–2017
143	Danny Califf	23	1	2002–2009
143	**Johnny Cardoso**	23	0	2020–
149	**Haji Wright**	22	7	2022-
149	Chris Klein	22	5	2000–2006
149	Chris Albright	22	1	1999–2007
149	Nick Rimando	22	0	2002–2017
153	**Maximilian Arfsten**	21	1	2025–
153	**Shaq Moore**	21	1	2018–2025
153	Jorge Villafaña	21	0	2017–2018
153	Kerry Zavagnin	21	0	2000–2006
157	Willy Roy	20	9	1965–1973
157	Angelo DiBernardo	20	3	1979–1985
157	**Matt Freese**	20	0	2025–
157	Wil Trapp	20	0	2015–2019
157	Richie Williams	20	0	1998–2002
162	Aron Jóhannsson	19	4	2013–2015
162	Conor Casey	19	2	2004–2010
162	Christopher Sullivan	19	2	1987–1992
162	Walter Bahr	19	1	1948–1957
162	Harry Keough	19	1	1949–1957
162	**Cameron Carter-Vickers**	19	0	2017–2025
162	David D'Errico	19	0	1974–1977
162	Cory Gibbs	19	0	2003–2006
170	Ed Murphy	18	5	1955–1969
170	Greg Villa	18	5	1977–1980
170	**Diego Luna**	18	4	2024-2025
170	Robbie Rogers	18	2	2009–2011
170	Chad Deering	18	1	1993–2000
170	Edgar Castillo	18	0	2009–2016
170	Colin Fowles	18	0	1977–1980
170	Bobby Smith	18	0	1973–1980
178	Charlie Davies	17	4	2007–2009
178	Freddy Adu	17	2	2006–2011
178	Gianluca Busio	17	1	2021–2024
178	Brad Davis	17	0	2005–2014
178	Steve Pecher	17	0	1976–1980
183	Mark Liveric	16	3	1973–1980
183	John Kerr	16	2	1984–1995
183	John Souza	16	2	1947–1952
183	**Auston Trusty**	16	2	2023–
183	Eric Lichaj	16	1	2010–2018
183	Barry Barto	16	0	1972–1975
183	Mike Fox	16	0	1984–1988
183	Alfredo Morales	16	0	2013–2019
183	Bruce Savage	16	0	1983–1992
183	Jackson Yueill	16	0	2019–2021
193	Julian Green	15	4	2014–2018
193	**Alejandro Zendejas**	15	2	2023–
193	Santino Quaranta	15	1	2005–2009
193	Adolph Bachmeier	15	0	1959–1969
193	C. J. Brown	15	0	1998–2003
193	Mark Dodd	15	0	1988–1998
193	Mike Flater	15	0	1975–1977
193	Jean Harbor	15	0	1992–1996
193	Zak Ibsen	15	0	1992–1998
193	Jim Pollihan	15	0	1976–1979
193	Steve Ralbovsky	15	0	1976–1978
193	Werner Roth	15	0	1972–1975
205	**Patrick Agyemang**	14	6	2025–
205	Jeff Cunningham	14	1	2001–2010
205	Fred Grgurev	14	1	1973–1976
205	Jason Kreis	14	1	1996–2000
205	Pat Noonan	14	1	2004–2008
205	**Tanner Tessmann**	14	1	2021-
205	Al Trost	14	1	1973–1978
205	Winston DuBose	14	0	1979–1985
205	Jim Gabarra	14	0	1987–1989
205	Nick Krat	14	0	1968–1972
205	**Aidan Morris**	14	0	2023-
205	Richard Mulrooney	14	0	2001–2004
205	**James Sands**	14	0	2021–2025
218	Peter Millar	13	9	1968–1972
218	**Jack McGlynn**	13	2	2024-2025
218	Ted Eck	13	1	1989–1996
218	Ventura Alvarado	13	0	2015
218	Terrence Boyd	13	0	2012–2016
218	Charlie Colombo	13	0	1948–1952
218	Kevin Crow	13	0	1984–1988
218	Sean Johnson	13	0	2011–2023
218	Daniel Lovitz	13	0	2019
218	Brian Maisonneuve	13	0	1997–2002
218	Dax McCarty	13	0	2009–2017
218	Benny McLaughlin	13	0	1948–1957
218	David Vanole	13	0	1986–1989
231	Jeff Hooker	12	1	1984–1987
231	Cle Kooiman	12	1	1993–1994
231	Greg Makowski	12	1	1978–1980
231	Chad Marshall	12	1	2005–2017
231	Jorge Acosta	12	0	1991–1992
231	Gregg Thompson	12	0	1984–1985
237	Brandon Vázquez	11	4	2023–2024
237	Chico Borja	11	3	1982–1988
237	Edson Buddle	11	3	2003–2012
237	Djordje Mihailovic	11	3	2019–2023
237	Siegfried Stritzl	11	2	1963–1973
237	Steve Birnbaum	11	1	2015–2017
237	Cade Cowell	11	1	2021–2024
237	Ringo Cantillo	11	0	1979–1982
237	Robbie Findley	11	0	2007–2010
237	Charlie McCully	11	0	1973–1975
237	Johnny Moore	11	0	1972–1975
237	Bill Sheppell	11	0	1949–1954
249	Kenny Cooper	10	4	2007–2009
249	Daryl Dike	10	3	2021–2023
249	Tyler Boyd	10	2	2019
249	Jacques LaDouceur	10	2	1984–1985
249	Al Zerhusen	10	2	1956–1965
249	George Nanchoff	10	1	1977–1979
249	Louis Nanchoff	10	1	1978–1980
249	Greg Garza	10	0	2014–2017
249	Ethan Horvath	10	0	2016–2024
249	Mike Ivanow	10	0	1973–1975
249	**DeJuan Jones**	10	0	2023-2025
249	Manuel Martin	10	0	1947–1949
249	Glenn Myernick	10	0	1977–1979
249	Chris Rolfe	10	0	2005–2009
249	Alex Skotarek	10	0	1975–1976
249	**John Tolkin**	10	0	2023-2025
265	Bill Looby	9	6	1954–1959
265	Dietrich Albrecht	9	2	1968–1969
265	Jordan Pefok	9	1	2021–2022
265	Sam Vines	9	1	2020–2022
265	Frank Borghi	9	0	1949–1954
265	Dan Canter	9	0	1983–1985
265	Troy Dayak	9	0	1990–1991
265	Jimmy Douglas	9	0	1924–1930
265	Marcus Hahnemann	9	0	1994–2011
265	Nick Lima	9	0	2019
265	Lee Nguyen	9	0	2007–2016
276	Nicholas Gioacchini	8	3	2020–2021
276	Tom Florie	8	2	1925–1934
276	Jonathan Lewis	8	2	2019–2021
276	Rudy Getzinger	8	1	1972–1973
276	Matthew Hoppe	8	1	2021–2023
276	Larry Hulcer	8	1	1979–1980
276	Kyle Martino	8	1	2002–2006
276	**Bryan Reynolds**	8	1	2021–
276	Mark Santel	8	1	1988–1997
276	Steve Sharp	8	1	1984–1985
276	**Brian White**	8	1	2024-2025
276	Amr Aly	8	0	1984–1985
276	Brian Carroll	8	0	2005–2010
276	Don Droege	8	0	1977–1979
276	Eddie Gaven	8	0	2004–2010
276	Brent Goulet	8	0	1986–1990
276	Bill Hamid	8	0	2012–2020
276	Larry Hausmann	8	0	1968–1972
276	Ty Keough	8	0	1979–1980
276	Justin Mapp	8	0	2005–2007
276	Jorge Siega	8	0	1973
276	Juergen Sommer	8	0	1994–1998
276	Zach Thornton	8	0	1994–2001
276	David Wagner	8	0	1996–1998
300	Frank Wallace	7	3	1949–1950
300	Gerry Baker	7	2	1968–1969
300	Steve Moyers	7	2	1980–1984
300	Davy Arnaud	7	1	2007–2009
300	Tony Bellinger	7	1	1977–1980
300	Jeff Durgan	7	1	1983–1985
300	Ed Souza	7	1	1947–1954
300	George Bello	7	0	2021–2022
300	Tony Crudo	7	0	1979–1982
300	John Diffley	7	0	1988
300	Tony Donlic	7	0	1977
300	**Damion Downs**	7	0	2025–
300	Gary Etherington	7	0	1977–1979
300	Santiago Formoso	7	0	1976–1977
300	Joey Kirk	7	0	1987–1988
300	Lawrence Lozzano	7	0	1994–1996
300	Kristoffer Lund	7	0	2023–2024
300	Werner Mata	7	0	1969–1973
300	George Moorhouse	7	0	1926–1934
300	George Pastor	7	0	1988–1989
300	Troy Perkins	7	0	2009–2010
300	Njego Pesa	7	0	1979–1982
300	Archie Roboostoff	7	0	1973–1975
300	Rubio Rubin	7	0	2014–2018
300	Martín Vásquez	7	0	1996–1998
300	Brian West	7	0	2001–2002
300	Herman Wecke	7	0	1954–1959
327	**Julian Hall**	6	5	2026
327	Gene Geimer	6	2	1972–1973
327	Ruben Mendoza	6	2	1954–1959
327	Dante Washington	6	2	1991–1997
327	Billy Gonsalves	6	1	1930–1934
327	Fred Pereira	6	1	1977
327	Mark Peterson	6	1	1980–1985
327	Fred Cameron	6	0	1959–1969
327	Donald Cogsville	6	0	1988
327	Ramiro Corrales	6	0	1996–2008
327	Neil Covone	6	0	1988–1990
327	John DeBrito	6	0	1991–1992
327	Mark Delgado	6	0	2018
327	Gary DeLong	6	0	1968
327	Joey Fink	6	0	1973–1975
327	Nick Garcia	6	0	2003–2005
327	Carl Gentile	6	0	1968
327	Victor Gerley	6	0	1965–1968
327	Julian Gressel	6	0	2023
327	Phillip Gyau	6	0	1989–1991
327	Alan Mayer	6	0	1976–1977
327	Jimmy McAlister	6	0	1977–1979
327	Jalen Neal	6	0	2023
327	Logan Pause	6	0	2009–2010
327	Bob Rigby	6	0	1973–1975
327	Zenon Snylyk	6	0	1956–1963
327	Eryk Williamson	6	0	2021–2023
327	Mike Winter	6	0	1972–1973
355	Ade Coker	5	3	1984
355	Yari Allnutt	5	2	1992–1993
355	Andy Auld	5	2	1926–1930
355	Helmut Bicek	5	2	1960–1965
355	**Mathis Albert**	5	1	2026
355	Sadri Gjonbalaj	5	1	1986–1993
355	Erhardt Kapp	5	1	1983–1985
355	Gino Pariani	5	1	1948–1950
355	Eddie Clear	5	0	1968
355	Dan Counce	5	0	1974–1976
355	Irving Davis	5	0	1924–1925
355	Dale Ervine	5	0	1985–1993
355	Chance Fry	5	0	1984
355	Jimmy J. Gallagher	5	0	1930–1934
355	Bob Gansler	5	0	1968
355	Kevin Grimes	5	0	1988
355	Kevin Hartman	5	0	1999–2006
355	Matt Hedges	5	0	2015–2017
355	Tom Kain	5	0	1986–1987
355	Perry Kitchen	5	0	2015–2016
355	Helmut Kofler	5	0	1968
355	Alain Maca	5	0	1973–1975
355	Michael Mason	5	0	1997
355	Pat McBride	5	0	1969–1975
355	Ane Mihailovich	5	0	1977
355	Lloyd Monsen	5	0	1952–1957
355	Drew Moor	5	0	2007–2008
355	Chris Pontius	5	0	2017
355	Eddie Radwanski	5	0	1985
355	Kyle Rote Jr.	5	0	1973–1975
355	Andy Rymarczuk	5	0	1973–1975
355	Frank Simek	5	0	2007
355	Troy Snyder	5	0	1985–1991
355	Alan Soñora	5	0	2023
355	John Traina	5	0	1957–1961
355	Marvell Wynne	5	0	2007–2011
391	Bert Patenaude	4	6	1930
391	Andy Straden	4	3	1924
391	Dom Dwyer	4	2	2017–2018
391	**Justin Ellis**	4	2	2026
391	Pete Matevich	4	2	1949
391	Juli Veee	4	2	1976–1982
391	Paul Bravo	4	1	1994–1997
391	Dario Brose	4	1	1994–1997
391	Jim Brown	4	1	1930
391	Teal Bunbury	4	1	2010–2012
391	Cornelius Casey	4	1	1954
391	Efrain Chacurian	4	1	1953–1954
391	Kelyn Rowe	4	1	2017–2018
391	Francis Ryan	4	1	1928–1936
391	**Cavan Sullivan**	4	1	2026
391	Sasha Victorine	4	1	2000–2003
391	**Paxten Aaronson**	4	0	2023–2025
391	Sonny Askew	4	0	1979–1984
391	Corey Baird	4	0	2019
391	Orest Banach	4	0	1969–1972
391	Jim Benedek	4	0	1968
391	Brian Benedict	4	0	1991–1992
391	David Brcic	4	0	1979–1985
391	Elvis Comrie	4	0	1984
391	Elwood Cook	4	0	1957
391	Andy Cziotka	4	0	1965
391	Rolf Decker	4	0	1953–1955
391	Buzz Demling	4	0	1973–1975
391	Altino Domingues	4	0	1975
391	Jeff Duback	4	0	1987–1989
391	Alex Ely	4	0	1960–1965
391	Joe Ferreira	4	0	1947–1948
391	William Findlay	4	0	1924–1928
391	Lynden Gooch	4	0	2016–2018
391	Dick Hall	4	0	1973–1975
391	Alan Hamlyn	4	0	1972–1975
391	Jay Heaps	4	0	2009
391	Raymond Hornberger	4	0	1924
391	Jack Hynes	4	0	1949
391	Bob Kehoe	4	0	1965
391	**Diego Kochen**	4	0	2026
391	Fred Kovacs	4	0	1972–1973
391	Jeff Larentowicz	4	0	2011–2012
391	Hank Liotart	4	0	1975
391	Barry Mahy	4	0	1973
391	Donald Malinowski	4	0	1954–1955
391	**Adri Mehmeti**	4	0	2026
391	Justin Morrow	4	0	2013–2018
391	Brian Mullan	4	0	2004–2007
391	John O'Connell	4	0	1949–1954
391	Fred O'Connor	4	0	1924
391	Erik Palmer-Brown	4	0	2018–2022
391	**Neil Pierre**	4	0	2026
391	**Brooklyn Raines**	4	0	2026
391	Gary Rensing	4	0	1972
391	Kenny Saief	4	0	2017–2018
391	C. J. Sapong	4	0	2012–2018
391	John Thorrington	4	0	2001–2009
391	Nelson Vargas	4	0	1991–1994
391	Dennis Wit	4	0	1975–1979
391	Alexander Wood	4	0	1930
391	Wally Ziaja	4	0	1973
454	Davey Brown	3	4	1925–1926
454	Alex Rae	3	3	1937
454	Ted Hantak	3	2	1987
454	John McEwan	3	2	1937
454	Joe Gaetjens	3	1	1950
454	Ulysses Llanez	3	1	2020
454	Joe Maca	3	1	1950
454	Bart McGhee	3	1	1930
454	George Nemchik	3	1	1936–1937
454	Miro Rys	3	1	1976
454	Denny Vaninger	3	1	1974–1975
454	Bayardo Abaunza	3	0	1965–1969
454	Raymond Beckman	3	0	1948
454	Tony Beltran	3	0	2013–2014
454	Bill Bertani	3	0	1948
454	David Bingham	3	0	2016–2017
454	Nat Borchers	3	0	2005–2010
454	Bobby Boswell	3	0	2006–2007
454	Michael Brady	3	0	1984–1985
454	Dan Calichman	3	0	1997
454	**George Campbell**	3	0	2025–
454	Peter Chandler	3	0	1975
454	Walter Chyzowych	3	0	1964–1965
454	Dave Coskunian	3	0	1973–1974
454	**Benjamin Cremaschi**	3	0	2023-2025
454	Leo Cullen	3	0	1999–2002
454	Konrad de la Fuente	3	0	2020–2021
454	John Dubienny	3	0	1937
454	Jason Dunn	3	0	1994
454	Svend Engedal	3	0	1956–1957
454	Charlie Fajkus	3	0	1982–1985
454	Sandy Feher	3	0	1968
454	Thomson Ferrans	3	0	1937
454	Ethan Finlay	3	0	2016
454	Willy Freitag	3	0	1960–1961
454	Steve Fuchs	3	0	1988
454	Emmanuel Georges	3	0	1973
454	Ted Gillen	3	0	1988
454	Joe Gyau	3	0	2014–2019
454	**Nathan Harriel**	3	0	2025
454	Miguel Ibarra	3	0	2014–2015
454	Nate Jaqua	3	0	2006–2008
454	Mike Jeffries	3	0	1984–1985
454	Burke Jones	3	0	1924
454	Miles Joseph	3	0	1996–1997
454	Matt Kmosko	3	0	1992
454	Hayden Knight	3	0	1984
454	Cornell Krieger	3	0	1965
454	Joseph Krische	3	0	1960–1961
454	Manny Lagos	3	0	2001–2003
454	Doc Lawson	3	0	1979
454	Zach Loyd	3	0	2011–2012
454	Miguel Malizewski	3	0	1968–1969
454	Joe Martinelli	3	0	1937
454	Art Martinich	3	0	1973
454	Ed McIlvenny	3	0	1950
454	Joseph Michaels	3	0	1937–1947
454	Andrija Novakovich	3	0	2018
454	Jerry Panek	3	0	1973
454	Andy Papoulias	3	0	1984–1985
454	Kevin Paredes	3	0	2023
454	Peter Pietras	3	0	1934–1936
454	Steve Pittman	3	0	1990–1997
454	Paxton Pomykal	3	0	2019–2023
454	Joseph Rego-Costa	3	0	1947–1948
454	Tibor Resznecki	3	0	1965
454	James Robertson	3	0	1916–1925
454	Luis Robles	3	0	2009–2017
454	Jorge Salcedo	3	0	1994–1998
454	**Patrick Schulte**	3	0	2024-2025
454	Harry Smith	3	0	1926–1928
454	Joe Speca	3	0	1960–1968
454	Bill Straub	3	0	1975
454	Archie Strimel	3	0	1948
454	Andy Strouse	3	0	1992
454	**Quinn Sullivan**	3	0	2025
454	Stefan Szefer	3	0	1973
454	Danny Szetela	3	0	2007–2008
454	**Timothy Tillman**	3	0	2024-2025
454	Gene Tober	3	0	1968
454	Raphael Tracey	3	0	1930
454	Ray Voltz	3	0	1937
454	Jonny Walker	3	0	2004
454	Herbert Wells	3	0	1924
454	Caleb Wiley	3	0	2023-
454	Peter Woodring	3	0	1993
454	William Yarbrough	3	0	2015–2016
540	Aldo Donelli	2	5	1934
540	Archie Stark	2	4	1925
540	Charles Ellis	2	2	1916
540	Rudy Kuntner	2	2	1928
540	Chris Mueller	2	2	2020–2021
540	Sebastian Soto	2	2	2020
540	Henry Carroll	2	1	1928
540	**Caden Clark**	2	1	2025
540	Harry Cooper	2	1	1916
540	Carl Fister	2	1	1960
540	James A. Gallagher	2	1	1928
540	Henry McCully	2	1	1975
540	**Matko Miljevic**	2	1	2025
540	James Murphy	2	1	1957
540	Christian Ramirez	2	1	2019
540	Dick Spalding	2	1	1916
540	Ed Valentine	2	1	1947
540	Ben Wattman	2	1	1949
540	Eric Alexander	2	0	2011–2014
540	Jonathan Amon	2	0	2018–2019
540	Jeff Baicher	2	0	1990–1991
540	Wade Barrett	2	0	2002–2007
540	Sam Bick	2	0	1976
540	Eric Biefeld	2	0	1986
540	Jesse Braga	2	0	1947
540	Jorge Benitez	2	0	1972
540	**Tristan Blackmon**	2	0	2025
540	Taylor Booth	2	0	2023
540	**Chris Brady**	2	0	2026
540	Will Bruin	2	0	2013
540	Bob Burkard	2	0	1952–1957
540	Joe Cannon	2	0	2003–2005
540	Carmen Capurro	2	0	1973
540	Bill Carnihan	2	0	1925–1926
540	Paul Child	2	0	1973
540	Neil Clarke	2	0	1916
540	Michael Collins	2	0	1988
540	Albert Cooper	2	0	1928
540	Sam Cronin	2	0	2009
540	John Currie	2	0	1937
540	Ed Czerkiewicz	2	0	1934
540	Sam Dalrymple	2	0	1924
540	Peter Dani	2	0	1976
540	John Deal	2	0	1928
540	A. J. DeLaGarza	2	0	2012
540	William Demko	2	0	1924
540	John Duffy	2	0	1928
540	Ronil Dufrene	2	0	1991
540	Todd Dunivant	2	0	2005
540	Edward Embarger	2	0	1954
540	**Emeka Eneli**	2	0	2025
540	Henry Farrell	2	0	1924
540	Kenny Finn	2	0	1960–1961
540	**Marlon Fossey**	2	0	2024-2025
540	Poli Garcia	2	0	1975
540	Josh Gatt	2	0	2012–2013
540	Luis Gil	2	0	2014–2015
540	Jonathan Gómez	2	0	2021–2023
540	Alan Gordon	2	0	2012–2015
540	Jim Gorsek	2	0	1985
540	Steve Grivnow	2	0	1948–1954
540	**Brian Gutiérrez**	2	0	2025
540	Raymond Hamilton	2	0	1937
540	Edward Hart	2	0	1924
540	John Hemingsley	2	0	1916
540	Manuel Hernandez	2	0	1974
540	Kamani Hill	2	0	2007
540	Julius Hjulian	2	0	1934
540	Duane Holmes	2	0	2019
540	Emerson Hyndman	2	0	2014–2016
540	Ugo Ihemelu	2	0	2006–2009
540	Carlos Jaguande	2	0	1992
540	Bernie James	2	0	1988
540	Carl Johnson	2	0	1924
540	Jerome Kiesewetter	2	0	2016
540	Ed Kelly	2	0	1975
540	Henry Kessler	2	0	2021
540	Joey Leonetti	2	0	1992–1996
540	Jack Lyons	2	0	1928
540	Joe Machado	2	0	1947
540	Lennard Maloney	2	0	2023
540	Jesse Marsch	2	0	2001–2007
540	Lucas Martin	2	0	1988
540	Tim Martin	2	0	1993–1996
540	Bob Matteson	2	0	1974
540	Sam McAlees	2	0	1937
540	Matt McKeon	2	0	1999
540	Willie McLean	2	0	1934
540	Doug McMillan	2	0	1973
540	Neil Megson	2	0	1988
540	Carlos Metidieri	2	0	1973
540	Robert Millar	2	0	1925
540	**Peyton Miller**	2	0	2026
540	Frank Moniz	2	0	1947
540	Jakes Mulholland	2	0	1924
540	Russ Murphy	2	0	1957
540	Thomas Murray	2	0	1916
540	Werner Nilsen	2	0	1934
540	Henry Noga	2	0	1960
540	George O'Neill	2	0	1973
540	Tim Parker	2	0	2018
540	Andrew Parkinson	2	0	1984
540	Val Pelizzaro	2	0	1957
540	Mike Petke	2	0	2001–2003
540	Fafà Picault	2	0	2016–2018
540	Donovan Pines	2	0	2021
540	Alan Prampin	2	0	1993
540	Matt Reis	2	0	2006–2007
540	Mike Renshaw	2	0	1972–1973
540	Angel Rodrigues	2	0	1937
540	Walter Romanowicz	2	0	1947
540	Bob Rooney	2	0	1957
540	Arthur Rudd	2	0	1924
540	Ed Ruddy	2	0	1937
540	Bruce Rudroff	2	0	1979
540	**Brian Schwake**	2	0	2026
540	Steve Sengelmann	2	0	1986
540	Tom Silvas	2	0	1986
540	Clarence Smith	2	0	1916
540	Ken Snow	2	0	1988
540	Steve Snow	2	0	1988–1989
540	Terry Springthorpe	2	0	1953–1957
540	Ben Sweat	2	0	2018
540	Thomas Swords	2	0	1916
540	George Tintle	2	0	1916
540	John Travis	2	0	1947
540	Roy Turner	2	0	1973
540	Peter Vagenas	2	0	2000–2003
540	**Indiana Vassilev**	2	0	2025
540	Arturo Velazco	2	0	1988
540	**Frankie Westfield**	2	0	2026
540	Billy Wilson	2	0	1925–1926
540	John Wolyniec	2	0	2004
540	Lou Yakopec	2	0	1949–1957
674	Otto Decker	1	2	1953
674	Ayo Akinola	1	1	2020
674	George Athineos	1	1	1953
674	Cole Bassett	1	1	2021
674	Ben Brewster	1	1	1973
674	Jack Marshall	1	1	1926
674	James Rhody	1	1	1924
674	Eddie Robinson	1	1	2008
674	Rob Ryerson	1	1	1988
674	Walt Schmotolocha	1	1	1965
674	Gale Agbossoumonde	1	0	2010
674	Robert Aitken	1	0	1928
674	Charles Altemose	1	0	1936
674	Robert Annis	1	0	1948
674	Julián Araujo	1	0	2020
674	Bruce Arena	1	0	1973
674	Josh Atencio	1	0	2024
674	Imad Baba	1	0	1999
674	Esmir Bajraktarevic	1	0	2024
674	**Reed Baker-Whiting**	1	0	2026
674	Gary Barone	1	0	1972
674	Chad Barrett	1	0	2008
674	Frank Bartkus	1	0	1936
674	Barney Battles Jr.	1	0	1925
674	Scott Benedetti	1	0	1996
674	John Best	1	0	1973
674	Tony Bonezzi	1	0	1961
674	Alex Bono	1	0	2018
674	Mike Bookie	1	0	1930
674	Ivan Borodiak	1	0	1964
674	Gordon Bradley	1	0	1973
674	Aage Brix	1	0	1924
674	George Brown	1	0	1957
674	Gordon Burness	1	0	1926
674	Jon Busch	1	0	2005
674	Carlos Bustamente	1	0	1961
674	Dan Califano	1	0	1973
674	**Cole Campbell**	1	0	2026
674	Willie Carson	1	0	1959
674	**Santiago Castañeda**	1	0	2026
674	Dave Cayemitte	1	0	1984
674	Tom Cecic	1	0	1968
674	Ted Chronopoulos	1	0	1997
674	Ben Cinowitz	1	0	1959
674	Colin Clark	1	0	2009
674	Neil Cohen	1	0	1976
674	Bill Connelly	1	0	1953
674	Mike Constantino	1	0	1988
674	Bill Conterio	1	0	1956
674	Cecil Correa	1	0	1973
674	Mac Cozier	1	0	1996
674	Robert Craddock	1	0	1954
674	Tony Crescitelli	1	0	1983
674	James Crockett	1	0	1936
674	Billy Crook	1	0	1984
674	Alberto Cruz	1	0	1991
674	Pedro DeBrito	1	0	1983
674	Windsor del Llano	1	0	1973
674	Bill Deszofi	1	0	1973
674	Paul DiBernardo	1	0	1985
674	Tony DiCicco	1	0	1973
674	Walter Dick	1	0	1934
674	Matt Diedrichsen	1	0	1916
674	Barney Djordjevic	1	0	1972
674	Dan Donigan	1	0	1990
674	Jim Dorrian	1	0	1956
674	Kyle Duncan	1	0	2020
674	Jeremy Ebobisse	1	0	2019
674	Joe Enochs	1	0	2001
674	Bill Eppy	1	0	1957
674	Alecko Eskandarian	1	0	2003
674	Bert Evans	1	0	1959
674	Marco Farfan	1	0	2020
674	Doug Farquhar	1	0	1959
674	Jock Ferguson	1	0	1925
674	Ian Feuer	1	0	1992
674	Dieter Ficken	1	0	1972
674	Pat Fidelia	1	0	1979
674	Bill Fiedler	1	0	1936
674	Jorge Flores	1	0	1996
674	James Ford	1	0	1916
674	Joe Franchino	1	0	2000
674	Tony Francillo	1	0	1973
674	Steve Frank	1	0	1973
674	Sean Franklin	1	0	2011
674	Leroy Franks	1	0	1957
674	Tom Galati	1	0	1975
674	Romain Gall	1	0	2018
674	Randy Garber	1	0	1975
674	Justo Garcia	1	0	1964
674	Chase Gasper	1	0	2020
674	Rudy Glenn	1	0	1984
674	Malcolm Goldie	1	0	1925
674	Bob Gormley	1	0	1954
674	Mike Gosselin	1	0	1992
674	**Zavier Gozo**	1	0	2026
674	Gene Grabowski	1	0	1957
674	Herman Graesser	1	0	1949
674	Alan Green	1	0	1984
674	Richard Green	1	0	1973
674	Mike Gregorian	1	0	1988
674	Frank Greinert	1	0	1936
674	Joshua Gros	1	0	2007
674	Diego Gutiérrez	1	0	2001
674	Henry Gutierrez	1	0	1999
674	Andrew Guyda	1	0	1936
674	Tim Harris	1	0	1985
674	Eddie Hawkins	1	0	1984
674	Willie Herd	1	0	1925
674	Aaron Herrera	1	0	2021
674	Eberhard Herz	1	0	1960
674	Mick Hoban	1	0	1973
674	Moe Hoffman	1	0	1973
674	Paul Holocher	1	0	1996
674	Charles Horvath	1	0	1964
674	Mirsad Huseinovic	1	0	1992
674	Tayt Ianni	1	0	1996
674	Erik Imler	1	0	1993
674	Frank Ivic	1	0	1973
674	Aziel Jackson	1	0	2024
674	Mark Jonas	1	0	1991
674	Bernard Kamungo	1	0	2024
674	James Kelly	1	0	1925
674	Findlay Kerr	1	0	1926
674	Ritchie Kotschau	1	0	2005
674	Richard Ledezma	1	0	2020
674	William Lehman	1	0	1934
674	Brooks Lennon	1	0	2021
674	Maurice Ligeon	1	0	1994
674	John Lignos	1	0	1982
674	Miguel Lopez	1	0	1977
674	Tim Logush	1	0	1975
674	Fred Lutkefedder	1	0	1936
674	Zen Luzniak	1	0	1988
674	Henry Margenson	1	0	1937
674	Alfonso Marina	1	0	1955
674	John Mason	1	0	1976
674	Mike Masters	1	0	1992
674	Andy Mate	1	0	1964
674	Chad McCarty	1	0	1999
674	Tommy McFarlane	1	0	1925
674	Duncan McGuire	1	0	2024
674	Johnny McGuire	1	0	1925
674	Ed McHugh	1	0	1952
674	Alan Merrick	1	0	1983
674	Henry Meyerdierks	1	0	1925
674	Helmut Michel	1	0	1961
674	Roy Milne	1	0	1953
674	Ilija Mitić	1	0	1973
674	Cecil Moore	1	0	1953
674	Sergio Mora	1	0	1972
674	Billy Morris	1	0	1926
674	Amiel Muniz	1	0	1949
674	Bryan Namoff	1	0	2007
674	Derek Nash	1	0	1955
674	Mike Noha	1	0	1964
674	Tommy O'Hara	1	0	1982
674	Gene Olaff	1	0	1949
674	Bob O'Leary	1	0	1973
674	Matthew Olosunde	1	0	2018
674	Rob Olson	1	0	1983
674	Curt Onalfo	1	0	1988
674	Ike Opara	1	0	2018
674	Owen Otasowie	1	0	2020
674	Victor Ottoboni	1	0	1959
674	Josef Pal	1	0	1965
674	Jeff Parke	1	0	2012
674	Keaton Parks	1	0	2018
674	Andrés Perea	1	0	2021
674	Eugene Petramale	1	0	1954
674	Telmo Pires	1	0	1975
674	Matt Polster	1	0	2018
674	Tom Presthus	1	0	1999
674	David Quesada	1	0	1995
674	Andy Racz	1	0	1964
674	Charlie Raphael	1	0	1988
674	Horst Rick	1	0	1964
674	Richard Roberts	1	0	1952
674	David Robertson	1	0	1925
674	Sam Rogers	1	0	2023
674	Walter Ronge	1	0	1961
674	Dale Russell	1	0	1978
674	Emmanuel Sabbi	1	0	2023
674	Frederick Scardina	1	0	1972
674	Willy Schaller	1	0	1952
674	Tom Schultz	1	0	1953
674	Uwe Schwart	1	0	1964
674	Carlos Scott	1	0	1975
674	Paul Scurti	1	0	1975
674	Manfred Seissler	1	0	1973
674	Brandon Servania	1	0	2020
674	Julio Servin	1	0	1973
674	Fred Zbikowski	1	0	1936
674	Clyde Simms	1	0	2005
674	Philip Slone	1	0	1930
674	Gabriel Slonina	1	0	2023
674	Mike Slivinski	1	0	1991
674	Dave Smyth	1	0	1988
674	Edmund Smith	1	0	1926
674	Kevin Smith	1	0	1993
674	Derek Spalding	1	0	1982
674	Scoop Stanisic	1	0	1993
674	Caleb Stanko	1	0	2016
674	Tommy Stark	1	0	1925
674	Tommy Steel	1	0	1925
674	Ryan Suarez	1	0	2003
674	Larry Surock	1	0	1952
674	Jamie Swanner	1	0	1984
674	Tony Tchani	1	0	2016
674	Billy Thompson	1	0	1988
674	Tim Twellman	1	0	1982
674	Brandon Vincent	1	0	2016
674	Marko Vuckovic	1	0	1973
674	Anthony Wallace	1	0	2011
674	Billy Walsh	1	0	1999
674	Doug Wark	1	0	1975
674	Zach Wells	1	0	2006
674	Kevin Welsh	1	0	1975
674	Howard Whatford	1	0	1949
674	Jeremiah White	1	0	2008
674	Bob Whitehead	1	0	1957
674	Richard Wild	1	0	1964
674	Chris Wingert	1	0	2009
674	Adam Wolanin	1	0	1950
674	Abbie Wolanow	1	0	1961
674	Andrew Wooten	1	0	2015
674	David Yelldell	1	0	2011
674	Sean Zawadzki	1	0	2024
674	Sal Zizzo	1	0	2007

== Goals ==
Active players are shown in bold.

Rank	Player	Goals	Caps	GPG	Years
1	Clint Dempsey	57	141	0.40	2004–2017
1	Landon Donovan	57	157	0.36	2000–2014
3	Jozy Altidore	42	115	0.37	2007–2019
4	**Christian Pulisic**	36	92	0.39	2016–
5	Eric Wynalda	34	106	0.32	1990–2000
6	Brian McBride	30	95	0.32	1993–2006
7	Joe-Max Moore	24	100	0.24	1992–2002
8	Bruce Murray	21	85	0.25	1985–1993
9	Eddie Johnson	19	63	0.30	2004–2014
10	Earnie Stewart	17	101	0.17	1990–2004
10	DaMarcus Beasley	17	126	0.13	2001–2017
10	Michael Bradley	17	151	0.11	2006–2019
13	Jesús Ferreira	15	23	0.65	2020–2023
13	Cobi Jones	15	164	0.09	1992–2004
15	Gyasi Zardes	14	67	0.21	2015–2022
15	Carlos Bocanegra	14	110	0.13	2001–2012
17	**Folarin Balogun**	13	33	0.39	2023–
17	**Ricardo Pepi**	13	42	0.31	2021–
17	Bobby Wood	13	45	0.29	2013–2018
17	**Weston McKennie**	13	73	0.18	2017–
17	Hugo Perez	13	73	0.18	1984–1994
17	Marcelo Balboa	13	127	0.10	1988–2000
23	Frank Klopas	12	39	0.31	1988–1995
23	Clint Mathis	12	46	0.26	1998–2005
25	Chris Wondolowski	11	35	0.31	2011–2016
25	Brian Ching	11	45	0.24	2003–2010
25	Jordan Morris	11	55	0.20	2014–2023
25	Peter Vermes	11	66	0.17	1988–1997
29	**Giovanni Reyna**	10	47	0.21	2020–
29	Paul Arriola	10	50	0.20	2016–2023
29	Eddie Lewis	10	82	0.12	1996–2008
32	Peter Millar	9	13	0.69	1968–1972
32	Willy Roy	9	20	0.43	1965–1973
32	Josh Wolff	9	52	0.17	1996–2008
32	Dominic Kinnear	9	54	0.17	1990–1995
32	**Brenden Aaronson**	9	59	0.15	2020–
32	Jovan Kirovski	9	62	0.15	1994–2004
32	Alexi Lalas	9	96	0.09	1991–1998
39	Sebastian Lletget	8	33	0.24	2017–2021
39	Tab Ramos	8	81	0.10	1988–2000
39	Eddie Pope	8	82	0.10	1996–2006
39	Claudio Reyna	8	112	0.07	1994–2006
43	**Haji Wright**	7	22	0.32	2022–
43	Rick Davis	7	35	0.20	1977–1989
43	**Malik Tillman**	7	41	0.17	2022-
43	Roy Wegerle	7	41	0.17	1992–1998
43	**Timothy Weah**	7	53	0.13	2018–
43	Thomas Dooley	7	81	0.09	1992–1999
43	Frankie Hejduk	7	85	0.08	1996–2009
50	Bert Patenaude	6	4	1.50	1930
50	Bill Looby	6	9	0.67	1954–1959
50	**Patrick Agyemang**	6	14	0.43	2025–
50	Herculez Gomez	6	24	0.25	2007–2013
50	Ante Razov	6	25	0.24	1995–2007
50	Taylor Twellman	6	30	0.20	2002–2008
50	Ben Olsen	6	37	0.16	1998–2007
50	Mix Diskerud	6	38	0.16	2010–2016
50	Sacha Kljestan	6	52	0.12	2007–2017
50	Oguchi Onyewu	6	69	0.09	2004–2014
50	John Harkes	6	90	0.07	1987–2000
61	Aldo Donelli	5	2	2.50	1934
61	**Julian Hall**	5	6	0.83	2026
61	Ed Murphy	5	18	0.28	1955–1969
61	Greg Villa	5	18	0.28	1977–1980
61	Chris Klein	5	22	0.23	2001–2006
61	**Josh Sargent**	5	29	0.17	2018–2025
61	Clarence Goodson	5	46	0.11	2008–2014
61	Graham Zusi	5	54	0.09	2012–2017
61	**Antonee Robinson**	5	64	0.08	2018–
61	Paul Caligiuri	5	110	0.05	1984–1997
71	Archie Stark	4	2	2.00	1925
71	Davey Brown	4	3	1.33	1925–1926
71	Kenny Cooper	4	10	0.40	2007–2009
71	Brandon Vázquez	4	11	0.36	2023–2024
71	Julian Green	4	15	0.27	2014–2018
71	Charlie Davies	4	17	0.24	2007–2009
71	**Diego Luna**	4	18	0.22	2024-2025
71	Aron Jóhannsson	4	19	0.21	2013–2015
71	**Sebastian Berhalter**	4	24	0.17	2025–
71	Preki Radosavljevic	4	28	0.14	1996–2001
71	Eric Eichmann	4	29	0.14	1986–1993
71	Michael Orozco	4	29	0.14	2008–2016
71	Roy Lassiter	4	30	0.13	1992–2000
71	Brek Shea	4	34	0.12	2010–2015
71	Steve Ralston	4	36	0.11	1997–2007
71	**Chris Richards**	4	45	0.09	2020–
71	Geoff Cameron	4	55	0.07	2010–2017
71	Jermaine Jones	4	69	0.06	2010–2017
71	Jeff Agoos	4	134	0.03	1988–2003
90	Alexander Rae	3	3	1.00	1937
90	Andy Straden	3	4	0.75	1924
90	Ade Coker	3	5	0.60	1984
90	Frank Wallace	3	7	0.43	1949–1950
90	Nicholas Gioacchini	3	8	0.38	2020–2021
90	Daryl Dike	3	10	0.30	2021–2023
90	Chico Borja	3	11	0.27	1982–1988
90	Edson Buddle	3	11	0.27	2003–2012
90	Djordje Mihailovic	3	11	0.27	2019–2023
90	John Souza	3	14	0.21	1947–1952
90	Mark Liveric	3	16	0.19	1973–1980
90	Angelo DiBernardo	3	20	0.15	1979–1985
90	Joe Corona	3	23	0.13	2012–2018
90	Stuart Holden	3	25	0.12	2009–2013
90	Juan Agudelo	3	28	0.11	2010–2018
90	**Alex Freeman**	3	28	0.11	2025-
90	John O'Brien	3	32	0.09	1998–2006
90	Ricardo Clark	3	34	0.09	2005–2012
90	Aaron Long	3	35	0.09	2018–2023
90	**Miles Robinson**	3	43	0.07	2019–
90	Tony Sanneh	3	43	0.07	1997–2005
90	John Brooks	3	45	0.07	2013–2021
90	**Sergiño Dest**	3	46	0.07	2019–
90	**Walker Zimmerman**	3	46	0.07	2017–2025
90	Omar Gonzalez	3	52	0.06	2010–2019
90	John Doyle	3	53	0.06	1987–1994
90	Chris Henderson	3	79	0.04	1990–2001
117	Otto Decker	2	1	2.00	1953
117	Charles Ellis	2	2	1.00	1916
117	Rudy Kuntner	2	2	1.00	1928
117	Chris Mueller	2	2	1.00	2020–2021
117	Sebastian Soto	2	2	1.00	2020
117	Ted Hantak	2	3	0.67	1987
117	John McEwan	2	3	0.67	1937
117	Dom Dwyer	2	4	0.50	2017–2018
117	**Justin Ellis**	2	4	0.50	2026
117	Pete Matevich	2	4	0.50	1949
117	Ruben Mendoza	2	4	0.50	1954–1959
117	Juli Veee	2	4	0.50	1976–1982
117	Yari Allnutt	2	5	0.40	1992–1993
117	Andy Auld	2	5	0.40	1926–1930
117	Helmut Bicek	2	5	0.40	1960–1965
117	Gene Geimer	2	6	0.33	1972–1973
117	Dante Washington	2	6	0.33	1991–1997
117	Gerry Baker	2	7	0.29	1968–1969
117	Steve Moyers	2	7	0.29	1980–1984
117	Tom Florie	2	8	0.25	1925–1934
117	Jonathan Lewis	2	8	0.25	2019–2021
117	Dietrich Albrecht	2	9	0.22	1968–1969
117	Tyler Boyd	2	10	0.20	2019
117	Jacques LaDouceur	2	10	0.20	1984–1985
117	Al Zerhusen	2	10	0.20	1956–1965
117	Siegfried Stritzl	2	11	0.18	1968–1973
117	**Jack McGlynn**	2	13	0.15	2024-2025
117	**Alejandro Zendejas**	2	15	0.13	2023–
117	John Kerr	2	16	0.13	1984–1995
117	**Auston Trusty**	2	16	0.13	2023–
117	Freddy Adu	2	17	0.12	2006–2011
117	Robbie Rogers	2	18	0.11	2009–2011
117	Conor Casey	2	19	0.11	2004–2010
117	Chris Sullivan	2	19	0.11	1987–1992
117	Perry Van der Beck	2	23	0.09	1979–1985
117	Danny Williams	2	23	0.09	2011–2017
117	Mark Chung	2	24	0.08	1992–1998
117	Boris Bandov	2	33	0.06	1976–1983
117	Brian Bliss	2	33	0.06	1984–1995
117	Steve Trittschuh	2	37	0.05	1987–1995
117	Jonathan Bornstein	2	38	0.05	2007–2011
117	Benny Feilhaber	2	44	0.05	2007–2017
117	Fabian Johnson	2	57	0.04	2011–2017
117	Kellyn Acosta	2	58	0.03	2016–2023
117	**Tyler Adams**	2	64	0.03	2017–
117	Chris Armas	2	66	0.03	1998–2005
117	Alejandro Bedoya	2	66	0.03	2010–2017
117	Mike Sorber	2	67	0.03	1992–1998
117	Steve Cherundolo	2	87	0.02	1999–2012
166	Ayo Akinola	1	1	1.00	2020
166	George Athineos	1	1	1.00	1953
166	Cole Bassett	1	1	1.00	2021
166	Ben Brewster	1	1	1.00	1973
166	Jack Marshall	1	1	1.00	1926
166	James Rhody	1	1	1.00	1924
166	Eddie Robinson	1	1	1.00	2008
166	Rob Ryerson	1	1	1.00	1988
166	Walt Schmotolocha	1	1	1.00	1965
166	Razzo Carroll	1	2	0.50	1928
166	**Caden Clark**	1	2	0.50	2025
166	Harry Cooper	1	2	0.50	1916
166	Carl Fister	1	2	0.50	1960
166	Henry McCully	1	2	0.50	1975
166	**Matko Miljevic**	1	2	0.50	2025
166	James Murphy	1	2	0.50	1957
166	Christian Ramirez	1	2	0.50	2019
166	Dick Spalding	1	2	0.50	1916
166	Ed Valentine	1	2	0.50	1947
166	Ben Wattman	1	2	0.50	1949
166	Joe Gaetjens	1	3	0.33	1950
166	Ulysses Llanez	1	3	0.33	2020
166	Joseph Maca	1	3	0.33	1950
166	Bart McGhee	1	3	0.33	1930
166	George Nemchik	1	3	0.33	1937
166	Miro Rys	1	3	0.33	1976
166	Denny Vaninger	1	3	0.33	1974–1975
166	Paul Bravo	1	4	0.25	1994–1999
166	James Brown	1	4	0.25	1930
166	Teal Bunbury	1	4	0.25	2010–2012
166	Cornelius Casey	1	4	0.25	1954
166	Efrain Chacurian	1	4	0.25	1953–1954
166	Kelyn Rowe	1	4	0.25	2017–2018
166	Francis Ryan	1	4	0.25	1928–1936
166	**Cavan Sullivan**	1	4	0.25	2026
166	Sasha Victorine	1	4	0.25	2000–2003
166	**Mathis Albert**	1	5	0.20	2026–
166	Sadri Gjonbalaj	1	5	0.20	1986–1993
166	Erhardt Kapp	1	5	0.20	1983–1985
166	Gino Pariani	1	5	0.20	1948–1950
166	Adelino Gonsalves	1	6	0.17	1930–1934
166	Fred Pereira	1	6	0.17	1977
166	Mark Peterson	1	6	0.17	1980–1985
166	Ed Souza	1	6	0.17	1947–1954
166	Davy Arnaud	1	7	0.14	2007–2009
166	Tony Bellinger	1	7	0.14	1977–1980
166	Jeff Durgan	1	7	0.14	1983–1985
166	Jimmy Gallagher	1	7	0.14	1930–1934
166	Rudy Getzinger	1	8	0.13	1972–1973
166	Matthew Hoppe	1	8	0.13	2021–2023
166	Larry Hulcer	1	8	0.13	1979–1980
166	Kyle Martino	1	8	0.13	2002–2005
166	**Bryan Reynolds**	1	8	0.13	2021–
166	Mark Santel	1	8	0.13	1988–1997
166	Steve Sharp	1	8	0.13	1984–1985
166	**Brian White**	1	8	0.13	2024-2025
166	Jordan Pefok	1	9	0.11	2021–2022
166	Sam Vines	1	9	0.11	2020–2022
166	George Nanchoff	1	10	0.10	1977–1979
166	Louis Nanchoff	1	10	0.10	1978–1980
166	Steve Birnbaum	1	11	0.09	2015–2017
166	Cade Cowell	1	11	0.09	2021–2024
166	Jeff Hooker	1	12	0.08	1984–1987
166	Cle Kooiman	1	12	0.08	1993–1994
166	Greg Makowski	1	12	0.08	1978–1980
166	Chad Marshall	1	12	0.08	2005–2017
166	Ted Eck	1	13	0.08	1989–1996
166	Jeff Cunningham	1	14	0.07	2001–2010
166	Fred Grgurev	1	14	0.07	1973–1976
166	Jason Kreis	1	14	0.07	1996–2000
166	Pat Noonan	1	14	0.07	2004–2008
166	**Tanner Tessmann**	1	14	0.07	2021-
166	Al Trost	1	14	0.07	1973–1978
166	Santino Quaranta	1	15	0.07	2005–2009
166	Eric Lichaj	1	16	0.06	2010–2018
166	Gianluca Busio	1	17	0.06	2021–
166	Chad Deering	1	18	0.06	1993–2001
166	Walter Bahr	1	19	0.05	1948–1957
166	**Maximilian Arfsten**	1	21	0.05	2025–
166	**Shaq Moore**	1	21	0.05	2018–2025
166	Chris Albright	1	22	0.05	1999–2006
166	Danny Califf	1	23	0.04	2002–2009
166	Paul Krumpe	1	24	0.04	1986–1991
166	Darlington Nagbe	1	25	0.04	2015–2018
166	Brad Evans	1	27	0.04	2009–2017
166	Reggie Cannon	1	28	0.04	2018–2022
166	Jimmy Conrad	1	28	0.04	1999–2010
166	Matt Miazga	1	28	0.04	2015–2023
166	Timothy Chandler	1	29	0.03	2011–2016
166	**Luca de la Torre**	1	32	0.03	2018–2025
166	Greg Vanney	1	37	0.03	1996–2005
166	Mike Lapper	1	43	0.02	1992–1995
166	Bobby Convey	1	46	0.02	2000–2008
166	Maurice Edu	1	46	0.02	2007–2014
166	Matt Besler	1	47	0.02	2013–2017
166	Brian Quinn	1	48	0.02	1991–1994
166	**Yunus Musah**	1	50	0.02	2020–
166	Kyle Beckerman	1	58	0.02	2007–2016
166	Fernando Clavijo	1	61	0.02	1990–1994
166	**Tim Ream**	1	86	0.01	2010–

== Assists ==
Active players are shown in bold.

USSF did not begin tracking assists until the 1970s. The top twenty are most likely accurate as no players before the mid-1980s amassed more than twenty or thirty caps. For example, Boris Bandov, the player active before 1980 with the highest number of caps, played 33 times between 1976 and 1983, while Perry Van der Beck played 23 times between 1979 and 1985. With the typical low scores of the times, it was unlikely any players before the 1980s assisted on more than a handful of goals.

Rank	Player	Assists	Caps	Years
1	Landon Donovan	58	157	2000–2014
2	Michael Bradley	23	151	2006–2019
3	Cobi Jones	22	164	1992–2004
4	**Christian Pulisic**	21	92	2016–
4	Clint Dempsey	21	141	2004–2017
6	Claudio Reyna	19	112	1994–2006
7	Eddie Lewis	16	82	1996–2008
7	Eric Wynalda	16	106	1990–2000
9	Tab Ramos	14	81	1988–2000
9	Joe-Max Moore	14	100	1992–2002
9	Jozy Altidore	14	115	2007–2019
12	DaMarcus Beasley	13	126	2001–2017
13	Fabian Johnson	11	57	2011–2017
13	Alejandro Bedoya	11	66	2010–2017
13	John Harkes	11	90	1987–2000
13	Alexi Lalas	11	96	1989–1998
17	**Antonee Robinson**	10	64	2018–
17	Gyasi Zardes	10	67	2015–2022
17	**Weston McKennie**	10	73	2017–
17	Chris Henderson	10	79	1990–2001
17	Steve Cherundolo	10	87	1999–2012
17	Brian McBride	10	95	1993–2006
17	Earnie Stewart	10	101	1990–2004
24	Clint Mathis	9	46	1998–2005
24	Jordan Morris	9	55	2014–2023
26	**Giovanni Reyna**	8	47	2020–
26	Jermaine Jones	8	69	2010–2017
26	Hugo Perez	8	73	1984–1994
26	DeAndre Yedlin	8	81	2014–2023
26	Jeff Agoos	8	134	1988–2003
31	**Sebastian Berhalter**	7	24	2025–
31	**Malik Tillman**	7	41	2022–
31	**Sergiño Dest**	7	46	2019–
31	Graham Zusi	7	54	2012–2017
31	**Brenden Aaronson**	7	59	2020–
36	Preki Radosavljevic	6	28	1996–2001
36	Taylor Twellman	6	30	2002–2008
36	Paul Arriola	6	50	2016–2023
36	Carlos Bocanegra	6	110	2001–2012
40	Brad Davis	5	17	2005–2014
40	**Maximilian Arfsten**	5	21	2025–
40	Stuart Holden	5	25	2009–2013
40	Heath Pearce	5	35	2005–2012
40	**Ricardo Pepi**	5	42	2021–
40	Brian Ching	5	45	2003–2010
40	**Cristian Roldan**	5	47	2017–
40	Josh Wolff	5	52	1996–2008
40	Sacha Kljestan	5	52	2007–2017
40	**Timothy Weah**	5	53	2018–
40	Kellyn Acosta	5	58	2016–2023
40	**Tim Ream**	5	86	2010–
52	**DeJuan Jones**	4	10	2023-
52	**Diego Luna**	4	18	2024-2025
52	Jesús Ferreira	4	23	2020–2023
52	**Luca de la Torre**	4	32	2018–2025
52	**Folarin Balogun**	4	33	2023–
52	Roy Wegerle	4	41	1992–1997
52	Bobby Convey	4	46	2000–2008
52	Eddie Johnson	4	63	2004–2014
60	Nick Lima	3	9	2019
60	**Auston Trusty**	3	16	2023–
60	Freddy Adu	3	17	2006–2011
60	Gianluca Busio	3	17	2021–2024
60	Charlie Davies	3	17	2007–2009
60	Robbie Rogers	3	18	2009–2011
60	Brad Evans	3	27	2009–2017
60	Juan Agudelo	3	28	2010–2018
60	Reggie Cannon	3	28	2018–2022
60	**Alex Freeman**	3	28	2025–
60	Sebastian Lletget	3	33	2017–2021
60	Chris Wondolowski	3	35	2011–2016
60	Steve Ralston	3	36	1997–2007
60	Bobby Wood	3	45	2013–2018
60	**Yunus Musah**	3	50	2020–
60	Oguchi Onyewu	3	69	2004–2014
75	Richard Ledezma	2	1	2020
75	Todd Dunivant	2	2	2006
75	Julian Gressel	2	6	2023
75	Nicholas Gioacchini	2	8	2020–2021
75	Jonathan Lewis	2	8	2019–2021
75	Justin Mapp	2	8	2005–2007
75	Chris Rolfe	2	10	2005–2009
75	Djordje Mihailovic	2	11	2019–2023
75	Terrence Boyd	2	13	2012–2016
75	**Jack McGlynn**	2	13	2024–2025
75	Pat Noonan	2	14	2004–2008
75	Edgar Castillo	2	18	2009–2016
75	Chris Klein	2	22	2000–2006
75	Darlington Nagbe	2	25	2015–2017
75	Matt Miazga	2	28	2015–2023
75	Timothy Chandler	2	29	2011–2016
75	Aaron Long	2	35	2018–2023
75	Jonathan Spector	2	36	2004–2015
75	Mix Diskerud	2	38	2010–2016
75	Benny Feilhaber	2	44	2007–2017
75	Kyle Beckerman	2	58	2007–2016
75	Pablo Mastroeni	2	61	2001–2009
98	Julián Araujo	1	1	2020
98	**Caden Clark**	1	2	2025
98	**Emeka Eneli**	1	2	2025
98	Alan Gordon	1	2	2012–2015
98	**Matko Miljevic**	1	2	2025
98	Chris Mueller	1	2	2020–2021
98	Ethan Finlay	1	3	2016
98	Corey Baird	1	4	2019
98	Teal Bunbury	1	4	2010–2012
98	Kelyn Rowe	1	4	2017–2018
98	C. J. Sapong	1	4	2012–2018
98	Drew Moor	1	5	2007–2008
98	**Julian Hall**	1	6	2026
98	Logan Pause	1	6	2009–2010
98	Eryk Williamson	1	6	2021–2023
98	Davy Arnaud	1	7	2007–2009
98	Matthew Hoppe	1	8	2021–2023
98	Sam Vines	1	9	2020–2022
98	Tyler Boyd	1	10	2019
98	**John Tolkin**	1	10	2023-2025
98	Steve Birnbaum	1	11	2015–2017
98	Edson Buddle	1	11	2003–2012
98	Cade Cowell	1	11	2021–2024
98	**Aidan Morris**	1	14	2023-
98	Santino Quaranta	1	15	2005–2009
98	**Alejandro Zendejas**	1	15	2023–
98	Eric Lichaj	1	16	2010–2018
98	Jackson Yueill	1	16	2019–2021
98	Conor Casey	1	19	2004–2010
98	Aron Jóhannsson	1	19	2013–2016
98	Jorge Villafaña	1	21	2017–2018
98	Kerry Zavagnin	1	21	2000–2006
98	Chris Albright	1	22	1999–2007
98	**Haji Wright**	1	22	2022-
98	Joe Corona	1	23	2012–2018
98	Michael Parkhurst	1	25	2007–2014
98	José Francisco Torres	1	26	2008–2013
98	Michael Orozco	1	29	2008–2016
98	**Josh Sargent**	1	29	2018–2025
98	**Mark McKenzie**	1	30	2020–
98	Ricardo Clark	1	34	2005–2012
98	Brek Shea	1	34	2010–2015
98	Maurice Edu	1	46	2007–2014
98	Clarence Goodson	1	46	2008–2014
98	**Walker Zimmerman**	1	46	2017–2025
98	Matt Besler	1	47	2013–2017
98	Geoff Cameron	1	55	2010–2017
98	Chris Armas	1	66	1998–2005
98	Frankie Hejduk	1	87	1996–2009
98	Kasey Keller	1	102	1990–2007

== Wins ==
Active players are shown in bold.

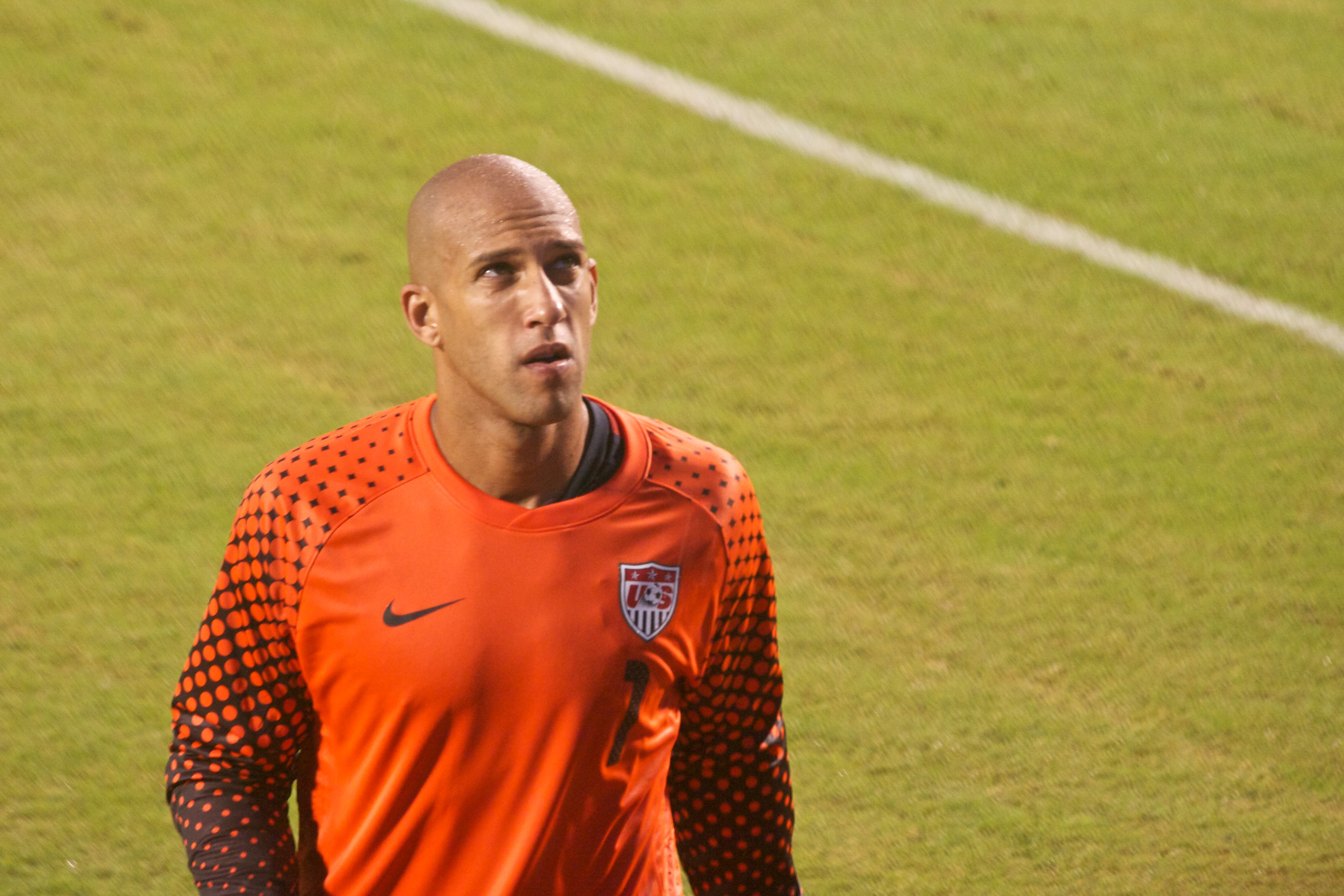
Tim Howard has won a record 61 of his 117 international matches

Rank	Player	Wins	SO	GP	GS	Min	GF	GA	GAA	Years
1	Tim Howard	62	42	121	119	10339	181	121	1.05	2002–2017
2	Kasey Keller	53	47	102	99	8893	153	81	0.82	1990–2007
3	Tony Meola	37	32	100	97	8663	120	107	1.11	1988–2006
4	Brad Guzan	34	20	64	55	5295	120	67	1.14	2006–2019
5	**Matt Turner**	29	27	55	55	4750	99	52	0.99	2021–
6	Brad Friedel	27	24	82	80	7025	99	84	1.08	1992–2004
7	**Zack Steffen**	16	11	30	29	2415	48	28	1.04	2018–2025
8	**Matt Freese**	11	5	20	20	1755	36	24	1.23	2025–
9	Nick Rimando	10	5	22	22	1620	44	14	0.78	2002–2017
10	Arnie Mausser	7	11	35	33	2700	22	48	1.60	1975–1985
11	Troy Perkins	5	3	7	7	660	14	11	1.50	2009–2010
11	Sean Johnson	5	7	13	9	947	14	2	0.19	2011–2023
13	**Diego Kochen**	4	3	4	3	315	14	0	0.00	2026–
13	Alan Mayer	4	1	6	5	450	5	6	1.20	1976–1977
13	Juergen Sommer	4	0	8	3	423	13	9	1.91	1994–1998
13	Jimmy Douglas	4	3	9	9	810	15	19	2.11	1924–1930
13	Marcus Hahnemann	4	1	9	8	569	10	5	0.79	1994–2011
13	Ethan Horvath	4	3	10	8	774	15	7	0.81	2016–2024
13	Winston DuBose	4	4	14	12	1080	13	19	1.58	1979–1985
13	Mark Dodd	4	7	15	13	1241	11	16	1.16	1988–1998
21	Sandy Feher	3	1	3	3	180	6	2	1.00	1968
21	Bill Hamid	3	3	8	6	544	11	6	0.99	2012–2020
21	Zach Thornton	3	2	8	6	544	5	4	0.66	1994–2001
21	Mike Ivanow	3	3	10	9	855	5	23	2.42	1973–1975
21	David Vanole	3	4	13	13	1125	12	15	1.20	1986–1989
26	Joe Cannon	2	1	2	1	90	2	0	0.00	2003–2005
26	**Brian Schwake**	2	1	2	1	135	4	1	0.67	2026
26	David Bingham	2	1	3	3	270	2	1	0.33	2016–2017
26	David Brcic	2	2	4	3	315	6	4	1.14	1979–1985
26	Donald Malinowski	2	1	4	4	360	9	8	2.00	1954–1955
26	Gary DeLong	2	1	6	5	536	13	14	2.35	1968
26	Victor Gerley	2	1	6	5	495	7	11	2.00	1965–1968
26	Frank Borghi	2	1	9	9	810	12	33	3.67	1949–1954
34	Alex Bono	1	1	1	1	90	3	0	0.00	2018
34	Jon Busch	1	1	1	1	90	3	0	0.00	2005
34	Findlay Kerr	1	0	1	1	90	6	1	1.00	1926
34	Tom Presthus	1	0	1	0	45	2	1	2.00	1999
34	Tommy Steel	1	0	1	1	90	6	1	1.00	1925
34	Zach Wells	1	1	1	0	11	0	0	0.00	2006
34	**Chris Brady**	1	0	2	1	90	2	2	2.00	2026
34	Julius Hjulian	1	0	2	2	180	5	9	4.50	1934
34	Matt Reis	1	1	2	2	180	3	1	0.50	2006–2007
34	George Tintle	1	0	2	2	180	4	3	1.50	1916
34	**Patrick Schulte**	1	0	3	3	270	4	4	1.33	2024-2025
34	William Yarbrough	1	0	3	1	135	3	1	0.67	2015
34	Luis Robles	1	1	3	3	225	5	4	1.60	2009–2017
34	Jonny Walker	1	1	3	3	225	2	1	0.40	2004
34	Jeff Duback	1	2	4	4	360	1	3	0.75	1987–1989
34	Kevin Hartman	1	1	5	2	315	10	4	1.14	1999–2006

== Shutouts ==
Active players are shown in bold.

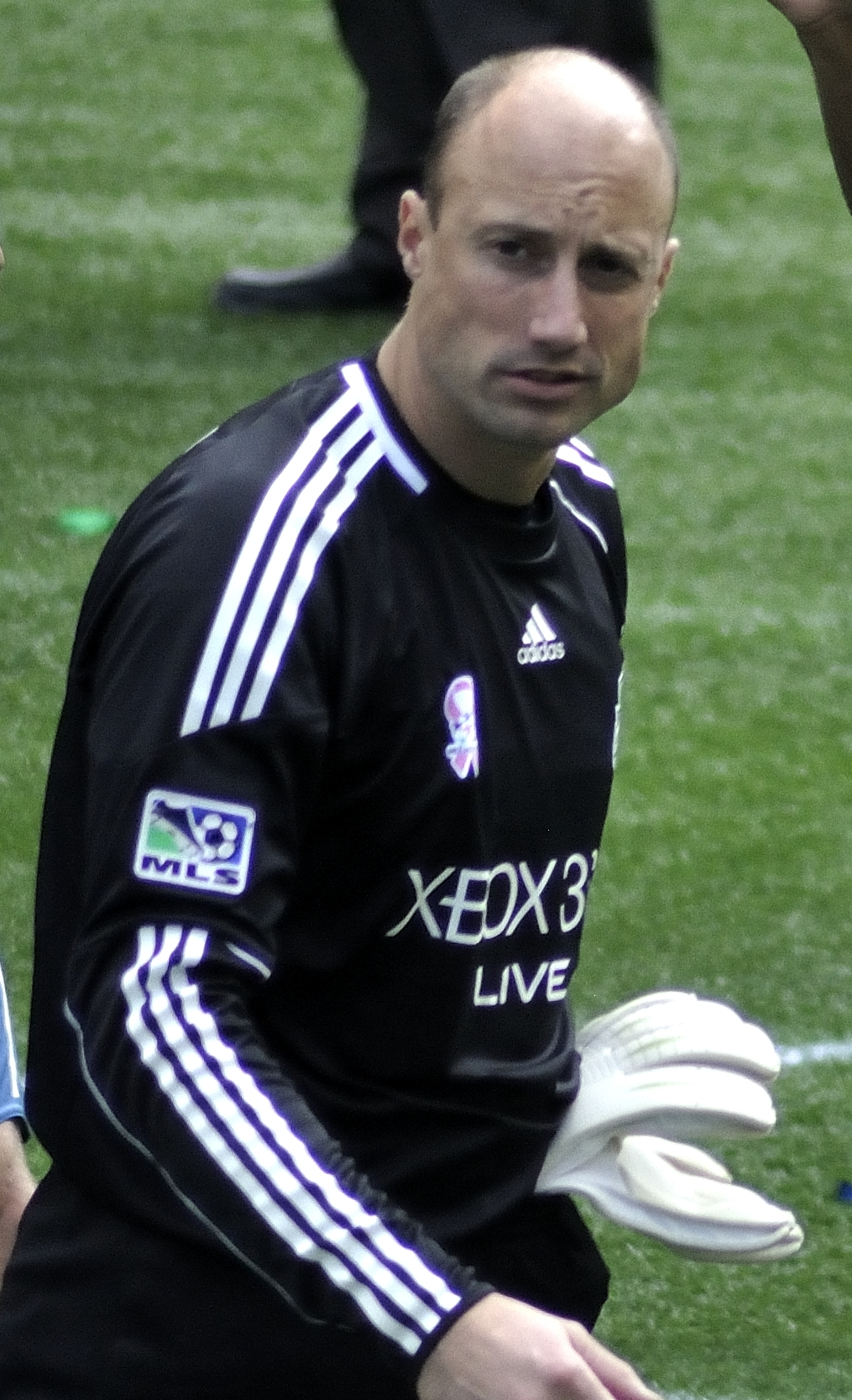
Kasey Keller kept a record 47 clean sheets in 102 international appearances

Rank	Player	Shutouts	Caps	Years
1	Kasey Keller	47	102	1990–2007
2	Tim Howard	42	121	2002–2017
3	Tony Meola	32	100	1988–2006
4	**Matt Turner**	27	55	2021–
5	Brad Friedel	24	82	1992–2004
6	Brad Guzan	20	64	2006–2019
7	**Zack Steffen**	11	30	2018–2025
7	Arnie Mausser	11	35	1975–1985
9	Sean Johnson	7	13	2011–2023
9	Mark Dodd	7	15	1988–1998
11	**Matt Freese**	5	20	2025–
11	Nick Rimando	5	22	2002–2017
13	Winston DuBose	4	14	1979–1985
14	**Diego Kochen**	3	4	2026–
14	Troy Perkins	3	7	2009–2010
14	Bill Hamid	3	8	2012–2020
14	Zach Thornton	3	8	1994–2001
14	Jimmy Douglas	3	9	1924–1930
14	Ethan Horvath	3	10	2016–2024
14	Mike Ivanow	3	10	1973–1975
14	David Vanole	3	13	1986–1989
22	David Brcic	2	4	1979–1985
22	Jeff Duback	2	4	1987–1989
22	Marcus Hahnemann	2	9	1994–2011
25	Alex Bono	1	1	2018
25	Jon Busch	1	1	2005
25	Zach Wells	1	1	2006
25	Joe Cannon	1	2	2003–2005
25	**Brian Schwake**	1	2	2026
25	David Bingham	1	3	2016–2017
25	Sandy Feher	1	3	1968
25	Jonny Walker	1	3	2004
25	Donald Malinowski	1	4	1954–1955
25	Kevin Hartman	1	5	1999–2006
25	Gary DeLong	1	6	1968
25	Victor Gerley	1	6	1965–1968
25	Alan Mayer	1	6	1976–1977
25	Frank Borghi	1	9	1949–1954

== See also ==
- List of United States men's national soccer team hat-tricks
- List of United States men's international soccer players born outside the United States
- List of United States men's national soccer team dual nationals
- List of United States women's international soccer players
