= List of United States men's national soccer team captains =

The following table includes players who have captained the United States men's national Football team (featuring all caps, goals and assists or goalkeeper wins and shutouts) from April 16, 1989, through July 2, 2025, a game with Guatemala. Values come from U.S. Soccer Federation Media Guide.

All other Captain amounts from 1916 to 1988 are based on extensive research of game film, match statistics and match lineups found on numerous websites, which have been able to place a captain with every FIFA USMNT Match.

== USMNT captains ==
Rank	Player	Captain	POS	GP	GS	G/GK-W	A/GK-SO	Years
1	Carlos Bocanegra	64	D	110	105	14	8	2001–2012
2	Tony Meola	55	GK	100	97	37	32	1988–2002
3	Michael Bradley	48	M	141	134	17	22	2006–2019
4	Claudio Reyna	46	M	112	94	8	19	1994–2006
5	Mike Windischmann	40	D	50	46	0	0	1984–1990
6	John Harkes	30	M	90	89	6	11	1987–2000
7	Christian Pulisic	28	M/F	76	28	32	18	2016–
8	Tim Ream	26	D	83	1	4	2	2010–2026
9	Kasey Keller	25	GK	102	99	53	47	1990–2007
10	Thomas Dooley	23	D/M	81	76	7	3	1992–1999
11	Clint Dempsey	20	F	140	122	57	20	2004–2017
12	Landon Donovan	19	M/F	157	142	57	58	2000–2014
	Marcelo Balboa	19	D	127	117	13	4	1988–2000
14	Peter Vermes	14	F	66	58	11	3	1988–1997
15	Walter Bahr	13	M	19	19	1	0	1948–1957
16	Rick Davis	12	M	35	35	7	0	1977–1988
	Werner Roth	12	D	15	15	0	0	1972–1975
18	Adolph Bachmeier	11	M	15	15	0	0	1959–1969
	Jeff Agoos	11	D	134	124	4	8	1988–2003
	Tyler Adams	11	M	48	1	2	0	2017-
21	Tim Howard	10	GK	120	118	61	42	2002–2017
22	Earnie Stewart	9	M/F	101	77	17	10	1990–2004
	Steve Pecher	9	D	17	17	0	0	1976–1980
	Wil Trapp	9	D	20	9	0	0	2015-2019
25	Al Trost	8	M	14	14	1	0	1973–1978
	Walker Zimmerman	8	D	45	3	2	0	2017–
27	Jozy Altidore	7	F	109	93	41	13	2007–2019
	DaMarcus Beasley	7	M/D	123	98	17	13	2001–2017
	Harry Keough	7	D	19	19	1	0	1949–1957
30	Brad Friedel	5	GK	82	80	27	24	1992–2004
	Eddie Pope	5	D	82	82	8	0	1996–2006
	Jimmy Conrad	5	D	28	23	1	0	2005–2010
	Manuel Martin	5	D	10	10	0	0	1947–1949
	Pablo Mastroeni	5	M	65	56	0	2	2001–2009
	Paul Caligiuri	5	D	110	93	5	4	1984–1997
	Mike Ivanow	5	GK	10	9	3	3	1973–1975
	Tom Florie	5	F	8	8	2	0	1925–1934
	Aaron Long	5	D	35	4	3	2	2018-
	Zack Steffen	5	GK	30	11	6	5	2018-
	Matt Turner	5	GK	52	0	0	0	2021-
41	Andy Straden	4	F	4	4	3	0	1924
	Willy Roy	4	F	20	20	9	0	1965–1973
	Kevin Crow	4	D	13	11	0	0	1984–1988
	Francis Ryan	4	M	4	4	1	0	1928–1936
	Brian McBride	4	F	95	76	30	10	1993-2006
	Mike Flater	4	F	15	14	0	0	1975–1977
	Cobi Jones	4	M/F	164	109	15	22	1992–2004
	Bob Kehoe	4	D	4	4	0	0	1965
	Clint Mathis	4	F	46	30	12	9	1998–2005
	Chris Armas	4	M	66	61	2	4	1998–2005
	Dave D'Errico	4	D/M	19	18	0	0	1974–1977
	Glenn Myernick	4	M	10	10	0	0	1977–1979
53	Eric Eichmann	3	M	29	16	4	0	1986–1993
	Fernando Clavijo	3	D	61	55	0	1	1990–1994
	Steve Cherundolo	3	D	87	83	2	10	1999–2012
	John Dubienny	3	M	3	3	0	0	1937
	Brad Guzan	3	GK	58	50	30	18	2006–2021
	Hugo Perez	3	M	73	66	13	8	1984–1994
	Tab Ramos	3	M	81	70	8	14	1988–2000
	Alejandro Bedoya	3	M	65	55	2	11	2010–2017
	Brian Quinn	3	M	48	41	1	2	1991–1994
	Weston McKennie	3	M	58	11	11	7	2017–
63	Zenon Snylyk	2	M	6	5	0	0	1956–1963
	Tom Kain	2	M	5	5	0	0	1986–1987
	Chris Henderson	2	M	79	3	0	0	1990–2001
	Jeff Durgan	2	D	7	7	1	0	1983–1985
	Alex Skotarek	2	D	10	10	0	0	1975–1976
	John Doyle	2	D	53	49	3	2	1987–1994
	Charlie McCully	2	F	11	11	0	0	1973–1975
	Jack Swithenby	2	F	2	0	0	0	1885-86
	Thomas Swords	2	F	2	2	0	0	1916
	Steve Trittschuh	2	D	37	31	2	0	1987–1995
	Eric Wynalda	2	F	106	90	34	16	1990–2000
	Archie Stark	2	M/F	2	2	4	0	1925
	Eddie Murphy	2	F	18	17	5	0	1955–1969
	Danny Califf	2	D	23	18	1	0	2002-2009
	Brian Ching	2	F	45	30	11	5	2003-2010
	Eddie Lewis	2	M/F	82	57	10	16	1996-2008
	Jermaine Jones	2	M	69	64	4	8	2010-2017
	Oguchi Onyewu	2	D	69	62	6	3	2004-2014
	Sebastian Lletget	2	M	17	4	2	0	2017-
	Paul Arriola	2	M	36	26	6	4	2016-
	Miles Robinson	2	D	28	3	21	6	2019–
	Chris Richards	2	D	30	27	2	0	2020-
85	Mark Dodd	1	GK	15	13	4	7	1988-1997
	Alexi Lalas	1	D	96	87	9	11	1991–1998
	Omar Gonzalez	1	D	51	44	3	0	2010–2019
	Graham Zusi	1	M/D	51	37	5	6	2012–2017
	DeAndre Yedlin	1	D	59	35	0	7	2014–2023
	Danny Williams	1	M	23	15	2	0	2011–2017
	Kyle Beckerman	1	M	58	46	1	2	2007–2016
	Dax McCarty	1	M	8	3	0	0	2009–2017
	Dominic Kinnear	1	M	54	9	0	0	1990–1993
	Jonathan Bornstein	1	D	38	32	2	0	2007–2011
	Frankie Hejduk	1	D	85	64	7	2	1996–2009
	Carlos Llamosa	1	D	29	23	0	2	1998–2002
	Richie Williams	1	M	20	11	0	0	1998–2002
	Boris Bandov	1	M	33	33	2	0	1976–1983
	Bob Gansler	1	D	5	5	0	0	1968
	Edward McIlvenny	1	M	3	3	0	0	1950
	George Moorhouse	1	D	7	7	0	0	1926–1934
	Eric Lichaj	1	D	15	10	1	1	2010-2018
	Bruce Murray	1	F	85	76	21	6	1985–1993
	Kellyn Acosta	1	M	58	2	0	0	2016-2024
	Sean Johnson	1	GK	13	0	21	6	2011-2023

- Steve Sampson stated that Thomas Dooley and John Harkes captained the majority of USMNT matches during Sampson's tenure from 1995 to 1998.
