= Ruddy =

Ruddy is a reddish-rosy crimson colour, closer to red than to rose.

Ruddy may also refer to:

== Surname ==
- Albert S. Ruddy (born 1930), Canadian-born American film producer
- Christopher Ruddy (born 1965), American journalist; CEO of NewsMax Media
- Craig Ruddy (1968–2022), Australian artist
- Denis Ruddy (born 1950), Scottish footballer
- Ed Ruddy (fl. 1933–1951), American soccer player
- Ella Giles Ruddy (1851–1917), American author, editor
- Jack Ruddy (born 1997), Scottish footballer
- John Ruddy (born 1986), English football player
- John D Ruddy, Irish actor and artist
- Joe Ruddy (1878–1962), American Olympic swimmer and water polo player
- Lisa Ruddy (born 1967), Canadian actress
- Michael A. Ruddy (1900–1987), American politician and businessman
- Rachel Ruddy (born 1988), Gaelic football player
- Ray Ruddy (1911–1938), American Olympic swimmer
- Stephen Ruddy (1901–1964), American Olympic swimmer
- Tim Ruddy (born 1972), American football player
- Tom Ruddy (1902–1979), English footballer

== Given name ==
- Ruddy Buquet (born 1977), French football referee
- Ruddy Lilian Thuram-Ulien (born 1972), French footballer
- Ruddy Lugo (born 1980), Dominican-American Major League Baseball pitcher
- Ruddy Rodríguez (born 1967), former Miss Venezuela World
- Ruddy Thomas (1951–2006), Jamaican musician
- Ruddy Zang Milama (born 1987), Gabon track and field athlete

== Other uses ==
- The Ruddy Sack, a former esports organization partly owned by IWDominate
- Ruddy (horse), winner of the 1951 Monmouth Oaks
- Bowdlerisation of or euphemism for bloody, a commonly used expletive attributive or intensifier

== See also ==
- Florid (disambiguation)
- List of colors (compact)
