= Scardina =

Scardina is an Italian surname, may refer to:

- Filippo Maria Scardina, Italian footballer
- Francesco Scardina, Italian footballer
- Frederick Scardina, American soccer player
- John Scardina American rule football player
- Julie Scardina, American animal ambassador
- Daniele Scardina, Italian Boxer
