= Bob Rooney =

Bob Rooney may refer to:

- Bob Rooney (Married... with Children), a character on Married... with Children
- Bob Rooney (soccer), U.S. soccer center forward
- Bobby Rooney (1938–2016), Scottish football winger
