= Tom Schultz =

Tom Schultz may refer to:

- Tom Schultz (soccer)
- Tom Schultz (Canadian football)
- Tom Schultz (forester), chief of the United States Forest Service

== See also ==
- Tom Scholz, American musician
- Tom Schütz, German footballer
