= Capurro (surname) =

Capurro is a surname. Notable people with the surname include:

- Alfred Drake (born Alfred Capurro; 1914–1992), American actor and singer
- Claudia Blum (née Blum Capurro; born 1948), Colombian psychologist and politician
- Alejandro Capurro (born 1980), Argentine footballer
- Bautista Capurro (born 2003), Argentine field hockey player
- Carmen Capurro, American soccer player
- Fernando Luis Capurro (born 1963), Chilean handball coach
- Fernando Miguel Rospigliosi Capurro (born 1947), Peruvian politician
- Francesco Capurro, 17th-century Italian painter
- Giovanni Capurro (1859–1920), Italian poet
- Luis Capurro (born 1961), Ecuadorian footballer
- Martina Capurro Taborda (born 1997), Argentine tennis player
- Santiago Capurro (born 1975), Argentine field hockey player
- Scott Capurro (born 1962), American comedian, writer and actor

== See also ==
- Capurro (disambiguation)
