= Donald Malinowski =

Donald Malinowski may refer to:

- Donald Malinowski (politician) (1924–2003), Catholic priest and politician in Manitoba, Canada
- Donald Malinowski (soccer), retired American soccer goalkeeper
