= Floride =

Floride may refer to:

Floride is the French name for Florida and may be used in Francophone references to the state:

- Floride (film)
- Renault Floride, a sports car
- French Florida (French: Floride française)

Other uses:

- An uncommon female given name – see e.g. Floride Calhoun
- A misspelling for "fluoride"
- A typeface by Deberny & Peignot

== See also ==
- Florid (disambiguation)
- Florida (disambiguation)
