= Gerley =

Gerley is a name. It may refer to:

- Victor Gerley (fl. 1965–1968), American soccer goalkeeper
- Gerley (footballer) (born 1990), Gerley Ferreira de Souza, Brazilian football left-back
