= Derek Nash =

Derek Nash may refer to:

- Derek Nash (soccer), American soccer player
- Derek Nash (musician) (born 1961), British jazz saxophonist
