= Richard Wild =

Richard Wild may refer to:

- Richard Wild (judge) (1912–1978), Chief Justice of New Zealand
- Richard Wild (cricketer) (born 1973), former English cricketer
- Richard Wild (soccer), American soccer player
