= Kenny Finn =

American soccer player-coach

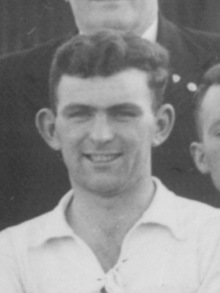
Ken Finn at Dundalk FC

Kenny Finn is an Irish former soccer player and Gaelic footballer. He spent four seasons in the League of Ireland before moving to the United States. He then played in the German American Soccer League as well as with the New York Gaelic football team. He earned two caps with the U.S. national soccer team.

== Soccer ==
=== Dundalk ===
Faced with the choice between Gaelic football and soccer, Finn chose soccer and signed as an apprentice with Dundalk when he turned fifteen. He became a first team starter at left back a year later. In 1958, Dundalk won the FAI Cup over Shamrock Rovers, never conceding a goal during the competition. Joe Sherwood in the Evening Press described the Ralph-Finn performance in the 1958 FAI Cup final as from 'two confident and happy Musketeers, a couple of fearless young men, who went full belt into their job with the same alacrity as a thief raiding his neighbour's woodpile'. In 1959, he left both Dundalk and Ireland when he emigrated to the USA.

=== German-Hungarians ===
When Finn arrived in the U.S., he settled in New York City, signing with the German-Hungarians of the German American Soccer League. He remained with the German-Hungarians for over a decade before retiring from playing professionally.

=== National team ===
Finn began his international soccer career as an Irish youth international. He played at least one game, as team captain, in 1955. Once he gained his U.S. citizenship, he was called into the senior U.S. national team. Finn earned his first caps with the U.S. national soccer team in a 2-0 World Cup qualification loss to Mexico on 13 November 1960. On 5 February 1961, he began his second national team game, against Colombia, as a defender. With the U.S. down two goals to none, the U.S. goalkeeper, Helmut Michel, was injured. Finn replaced him in goal for half time and kept a clean sheet from that point on.

=== Coaching ===
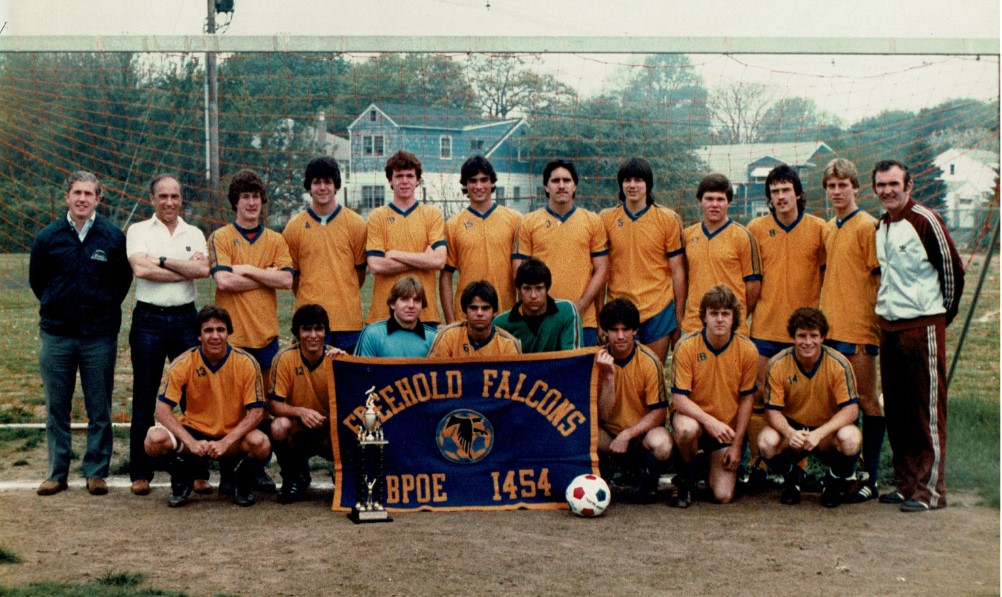
1983 NJ State U-19 Champions coached by Ken Finn (far right)

After retiring from playing professionally, Finn entered the coaching ranks and coached his two sons, Kevin and Kenny in youth soccer which included the U19 NJ State Cup championship in 1983. Finn guided the Freehold Falcons to a state cup victory over the Kearny Scotts which included Tab Ramos, John Harkes, Kris Peat, and Peter Gaynor. Both of Finn's son's went on to play college soccer at Virginia Tech. Kenny's Granddaughter, Lauren Burford played Basketball for Villanova and his Grandson Brian Finn plays soccer for the University of Notre Dame.

== Gaelic football ==
Finn had played football as a lad, earning an invitation to play with Louth GAA, but gave it up when he signed a contract with Dundalk, an Irish soccer club. When Finn arrived in New York City in 1959, he joined a local football club which played in Gaelic Park. In 1967, he was part of one of the sport's great upsets when the team representing New York defeated the 1967 National Football League champions Galway in a two-game final. In the first game, played 14 May 1967, New York defeated Galway 3–5 to 1–6 in New York. A week later, they won again, 4–3 to 0–10 in Ireland. Finn played a total of sixteen years with New York.
