= Sandy Feher =

Hungarian-American footballer

Personal information
- Date of birth: 23 August 1943 (age 83)
- Place of birth: Budapest, Hungary
- Position: Goalkeeper

Senior career*
| Years | Team | Apps | (Gls) |
| 1970 | Kansas City Spurs | 5 | (0) |

International career
| 1968 | United States MNT | 3 | (0) |
- * Club domestic league appearances and goals

Sandy Feher (born 23 August 1943 in Budapest, Hungary) is a Hungarian-American former soccer goalkeeper. In 1970, Feher spent one season, playing five games with the Kansas City Spurs of the North American Soccer League (NASL). He also earned three caps with the U.S. national team in 1968. His first cap came in a 6–3 win over Haiti on October 20, 1968. His second came seven days later in a 1–0 win over Canada in a qualifier for the 1970 FIFA World Cup. His last cap came in a 6–2 win over Bermuda in a World Cup qualifier. However, Gary DeLong came on for Feher in the fourth minute of the match.
