= Tom Cecic =

American soccer player

Personal information
- Full name: Tiho Cecic
- Date of birth: August 18, 1941 (age 85)
- Place of birth: Independent State of Croatia
- Date of death: June 16, 2010 (aged 64)
- Height: 1.78 m (5 ft 10 in)
- Position: Defender

Senior career*
Years	Team	Apps	(Gls)
1968	Chicago Mustangs	10	(1)
1973	Miami Toros	1	(0)

International career
1968	United States	1	(0)
- * Club domestic league appearances and goals

Tom Cecic was a soccer player who played as a defender who spent two seasons in the North American Soccer League. Born in Croatia, he earned one cap for the United States national team.

== NASL ==
Cecic spent two seasons in the North American Soccer League. In 1968, he played for the Chicago Mustangs and in 1973 with the Miami Toros.

== National team ==
Cecic earned his one cap with the national team in a 3–3 tie with Israel on September 15, 1968, when he came on for Adolph Bachmeier.

== Family ==
Cecic was survived by his son, Jordan Cecic (Michelle), of Pembroke Pines, Florida; daughters Cristina Bilardello of Hollywood, Florida, and Michelle Piso (Marcello) of Pembroke Pines; and seven grandchildren: Andrew James, Jordana, Isabella, Marcella, Augustino, Orlando, and Gabriella.
