= Zen Luzniak =

American soccer player

Personal information
- Full name: Zenon Luzniak
- Place of birth: Newark, New Jersey, United States
- Position: Defender

College career
Years	Team	Apps	(Gls)
1987–1989	Wake Forest Demon Deacons	37	(4)

Senior career*
Years	Team	Apps	(Gls)
1991–1994	Fort Lauderdale Strikers	34	(1)
1996, 1999	Carolina Dynamo	18	(0)

International career
1988	United States	1	(0)
- * Club domestic league appearances and goals

Zenon "Zen" Luzniak is a U.S. soccer defender who spent three seasons in the American Professional Soccer League and two in the USISL. He also played in Europe for two seasons. He also earned one cap with the United States men's national soccer team making him the youngest player to ever play for the US at the that time.

== High school and college ==
Luzniak grew up in Cooper City, Florida, where he attended Cooper City High School from 1984 to 1987. During his four seasons on the Cooper City soccer team, he led the team in scoring. He then attended Wake Forest University where he played on the men's soccer team. In his two seasons, 1987–1988, with the Demon Deacons, Luzniak scored four goals in thirty-seven games, also earning him a spot on the all ACC team. He tore a ligament in his right knee during his junior season and left Wake to rehab with a Netherlands team.

== Professional ==
When Luzniak left college, he went to the Netherlands to complete his knee rehabilitation for FC Utrecht Reserve Team. When Luzniak returned to the United States in 1991, he signed with the Fort Lauderdale Strikers of the American Professional Soccer League and played four seasons with them. During this period, he was signed by HHV Reutlingen in Germany. Luzniak played there for one season, but returned after a financial dispute with the club. He was drafted by the Tampa Bay Mutiny in the thirteen round (127th overall) in the 1996 MLS Draft. However, he never played for the Mutiny, but joined the Carolina Dynamo of the USISL for the 1996 season. He signed with the Dynamo in 1999, but on May 8, 1999, he tore his anterior-cruciate ligament in a game against the Myrtle Beach Seadawgs.

== National team ==
Luzniak earned one cap with the U.S. national team in a 1–0 win over Costa Rica on June 14, 1988, when he came on for Donald Cogsville. This made him the youngest player to represent his country at that time. He continued to play for his national team until his knee injury sidelined him.
