= Capurro (disambiguation) =

Capurro is a barrio (neighbourhood or district) in Montevideo, Uruguay.

Capurro may also refer to:

== People ==
- Capurro (surname), a list of people with the surname

== Places ==
- Capurro, Uruguay, a populated centre in San José Department, Uruguay
- Estadio Parque Capurro, a multi-use stadium in Montevideo, Uruguay
