= Gene Tober =

American soccer player

Gene Tober is a former U.S. soccer player who earned three caps with the United States.

Tober's first game with the national team was in a 4–0 loss to Israel on September 25, 1968, when he came on for Adolph Bachmeier. His second game was a 5–2 loss to Haiti on October 21. His last was a 1–0 loss to Haiti two days later.
