= Justo Garcia =

American soccer player

Personal information
- Position: Defender

Senior career*
Years	Team	Apps	(Gls)
1963–1965	New York Hota		

International career
1964	United States MNT	1	(0)
- * Club domestic league appearances and goals

Justo Garcia was an American soccer player who earned one cap with the U.S. national team in a 10–0 loss to England on May 27, 1964. In 1964, he played with New York Hota of the German American Soccer League. He then played for the Hota in the Eastern Professional Soccer League during the 1964–1965 season.
