= George Athineos =

Greek-American footballer (1923–2002)

George S. Athineos (Greek: Γιώργος Αθηναίος; 16 December 1923 – 16 July 2002) was a Greek-American football forward. He played professionally in Greece, the German American Soccer League and American Soccer League. He also earned one cap with the U.S. national team.

Athineos was born in Greece and spent three seasons in the Greek first division. In 1948, he signed with the Greek American AA of the German American Soccer League. He moved to S.C. Eintracht, another GASL team, at some point, before leaving the team and league in 1954. In 1953, he led the GASL in scoring. In 1954, he signed with Brooklyn Hakoah in the American Soccer League. He played four seasons with Hakoah, renamed New York Hakoah after Brooklyn merged with the New York Americans in 1956. He was the league's third leading scoring for the 1954–1955 season with sixteen goals.

His lone appearance with the United States national team came on 8 June 1953. That day, he scored a goal (penalty kick) in the 66th minute of a 6–3 loss to England in New York City.

Athineos died on 16 July 2002 in Riverdale, New York.
