= Emmanuel Georges =

American soccer player

Emmanuel Georges (Emanuel Georgev) is a former U.S. soccer defender.

== National team ==
Georges earned three caps with the U.S. national team in 1973. All three games took place over a seven-day period in August 1973. The first was a 1–0 loss to Poland. While he started the game, he came off for Bob O'Leary at halftime. He then played the full game in a 2–0 win over Canada two days later. That was followed by his third and final national team game, a 4–0 loss to Poland on August 10, 1973. He again started the game, but was replaced by Archie Roboostoff at halftime.
