= Cecil Correa =

American soccer player

Personal information
- Position: Defender

International career
Years	Team	Apps	(Gls)
1973	United States MNT	1	(0)

Cecil Correa was a U.S. soccer defender who earned one cap with the U.S. national team in a 4–0 loss to Poland on August 10, 1973. Correa, and most of his teammates, were from the second division American Soccer League after the first division North American Soccer League refused to release players for the game.
