= Josef Pal =

American soccer player

Josef Pal was a U.S. soccer player who earned one cap with the U.S. national team in a 1-0 World Cup qualification win over Honduras on March 17, 1965. He spent his club career with the German American Soccer League. In 1962, he was with New York Hungaria when it won the National Challenge Cup.
