= Sam McAlees =

American soccer player (1910–1993)

Personal information
- Full name: Samuel McAlees
- Date of birth: November 3, 1910
- Place of birth: United States
- Date of death: September 29, 1993 (aged 82)
- Place of death: Pennsylvania, United States

Senior career*
Years	Team	Apps	(Gls)
1934–	Philadelphia German-Americans		
–1940	New York Americans		

International career
1937	United States	2	(0)
- * Club domestic league appearances and goals

Sam McAlees (November 3, 1910 – September 29, 1993) was an American soccer player who earned two caps with the U.S. national team in 1937. He also played six seasons in the American Soccer League.

== Club career ==
McAlees signed with the Philadelphia German-Americans of the American Soccer League in 1934. He remained with Philadelphia through at least 1936 when the German-Americans defeated the St. Louis Shamrocks to win the 1936 National Challenge Cup McAlees then moved to the New York Americans. He retired from the ASL in 1940.

== International career ==
His first game with the national team in a 7–2 loss to Mexico on September 12, 1937. His second game was a 7–3 loss to Mexico on September 25, 1937.

McAlees was inducted into the Pennsylvania Sports Hall of Fame in 1985 and the Southeastern Pennsylvania Soccer Hall of Fame in 1988.
