= Howard Whatford =

American soccer player

Personal information
- Date of birth: March 17, 1928
- Place of birth: Rochester, New York, USA
- Date of death: November 27, 2007 (aged 79)
- Place of death: Little River, South Carolina, USA

College career
Years	Team	Apps	(Gls)
1946-1949	SUNY Brockport		

International career
1949	United States	1	
Military career
Allegiance	United States
Branch	Navy
Conflicts	World War II

Howard H. "Weasel" Whatford (March 17, 1928 - November 27, 2007) was an American soccer outside right who some sources list as earning a cap with the U.S. national team in a 4–0 loss to Scotland on June 19, 1949.

== Career ==
According to the National Soccer Hall of Fame, Whatford earned one cap in 1949. However, the Hall of Fame does not have him on the rosters of any of the 1949 games. RSSSF also does not list him on the rosters for the 1949 games. To make matters more uncertain, RSSSF and the Hall of Fame do not agree on the U.S. lineups. However, the Hall of Fame historian, Colin Jose, has Whatford starting the game before coming off for Pete Matevich on his personalweb site.

He attended SUNY Brockport where he played on the men's soccer team from 1946 to 1949. He was a 1947 first team and a 1948 second team All American. He was also the co-captain in 1949. He graduated in 1950 and was inducted into the Brockport Hall of Fame in 1995. He died in 2007.
