= List of United States men's national soccer team hat-tricks =

This article is a list of the hat tricks scored by or conceded by the United States men's national soccer team. Besides the instances of a player scoring three goals in a game, the list also includes games where a player has scored more than three goals.

Landon Donovan and Jesús Ferreira are the all-time leaders for the United States national team with three hat tricks. The only other players with multiple hat tricks in international play are Jozy Altidore and Clint Dempsey, each with two hat tricks apiece.

== Hat-tricks scored by the United States ==
Score lists United States first.

No.	Player	Opponent	Goals	Score	Venue	Competition	Date	Ref
1	Archie Stark	Canada	5	6–1	Ebbets Field, Brooklyn	Friendly	November 8, 1925	
2	Bert Patenaude	Paraguay	3 – (10', 15', 50')	3–0	Estadio Gran Parque Central, Montevideo	1930 FIFA World Cup	July 17, 1930	
3	Aldo Donelli	Mexico	4 – (17', 30', 74', 87')	4–2	Stadio Nazionale PNF, Rome	1934 FIFA World Cup qualification	May 24, 1934	
4	Peter Millar	Bermuda	3 – (22', 63', 82')	6–2	Municipal Stadium, Kansas City, Missouri	1970 FIFA World Cup qualification	November 2, 1968	
5	Joe-Max Moore	El Salvador	4 – (35', 42', 65', 70')	7–0	Los Angeles Memorial Coliseum, Los Angeles	Friendly	December 5, 1993	
6	Brian McBride	El Salvador	3 – (9', 11', 21')	4–0	Rose Bowl, Pasadena, California	2002 CONCACAF Gold Cup	January 27, 2002	
7	Landon Donovan	Cuba	4 – (22', 26', 55', 76')	5–0	Gillette Stadium, Foxborough, Massachusetts	2003 CONCACAF Gold Cup	July 19, 2003	
8	Eddie Johnson	Panama	3 – (71', 85', 88')	6–0	Robert F. Kennedy Memorial Stadium, Washington, D.C.	2006 FIFA World Cup qualification	October 13, 2004	
9	Taylor Twellman	Norway	3 – (5', 17', 76')	5–0	Home Depot Center, Carson, California	Friendly	January 29, 2006	
10	Landon Donovan (2)	Ecuador	3 – (1', 66', 67')	3–1	Raymond James Stadium, Tampa, Florida	Friendly	March 25, 2007	
11	Sacha Kljestan	Sweden	3 – (17', 40' pen., 74')	3–2	Home Depot Center, Carson, California	Friendly	January 24, 2009	
12	Jozy Altidore	Trinidad and Tobago	3 – (13', 71', 89')	3–0	Nissan Stadium, Nashville, Tennessee	2010 FIFA World Cup qualification	April 1, 2009	
13	Landon Donovan (3)	Scotland	3 – (3', 59', 65')	5–1	EverBank Field, Jacksonville, Florida	Friendly	May 26, 2012	
14	Chris Wondolowski	Belize	3 – (12', 37', 41')	6–1	Providence Park, Portland, Oregon	2013 CONCACAF Gold Cup	July 9, 2013	
15	Jozy Altidore (2)	Bosnia and Herzegovina	3 – (59', 84', 86')	4–3	Koševo City Stadium, Sarajevo	Friendly	August 14, 2013	
16	Clint Dempsey	Cuba	3 – (4', 64', 78')	6–0	M&T Bank Stadium, Baltimore	2015 CONCACAF Gold Cup	July 18, 2015	
17	Clint Dempsey (2)	Honduras	3 – (32', 49', 54')	6–0	Avaya Stadium, San Jose, California	2018 FIFA World Cup qualification	March 25, 2017	
18	Weston McKennie	Cuba	3 – (1', 5', 13')	7–0	Audi Field, Washington, D.C.	2019–20 CONCACAF Nations League	October 11, 2019	
19	Christian Pulisic	Panama	3 – (17' pen., 45+4' pen., 65')	5–1	Exploria Stadium, Orlando, Florida	2022 FIFA World Cup qualification	March 27, 2022	
20	Jesús Ferreira	Grenada	4 – (43', 54', 56', 78')	5–0	Q2 Stadium, Austin, Texas	2022–23 CONCACAF Nations League	June 10, 2022	
21	Jesús Ferreira (2)	Saint Kitts and Nevis	3 – (16', 25', 50')	6–0	CityPark, St. Louis, Missouri	2023 CONCACAF Gold Cup	June 28, 2023	
22	Jesús Ferreira (3)	Trinidad and Tobago	3 – (14', 38', 45+3' pen.)	6–0	Bank of America Stadium, Charlotte, North Carolina	2023 CONCACAF Gold Cup	July 2, 2023	

== Hat-tricks conceded by the United States ==
Score lists United States first.

No.	Player	Opponent	Goals	Score	Venue	Competition	Date	Ref
1	Ned Brooks	Irish Free State	3	1–3	Dalymount Park, Dublin	Friendly	June 16, 1924	
2	Domingo Tarasconi	Argentina	4 – (24', 63', 66', 89')	2–11	Olympic Stadium, Amsterdam	1928 Summer Olympics	May 29, 1928	
3	Roberto Cherro	Argentina	3 – (47', 49', 57')	2–11	Olympic Stadium, Amsterdam	1928 Summer Olympics	May 29, 1928	
4	Angelo Schiavio	Italy	3 – (18', 29', 64')	1–7	Stadio Nazionale PNF, Rome	1934 FIFA World Cup	May 27, 1934	
5	Dally Duncan	Scotland	3	1–5	Polo Grounds, Manhattan	Friendly	May 19, 1935	
6	Manuel Alonso	Mexico	3 – (38', 54', 66')	3–7	Parque Necaxa, Mexico City	Friendly	September 19, 1937	
7	Adalberto López	Mexico	3 – (3', 35', 85')	0–5	Gran Stadium Cervecería Tropical, Havana	1947 NAFC Championship	July 13, 1947	
8	Gunnar Thoresen	Norway	3	0–11	Ullevaal Stadion, Oslo	Friendly	August 6, 1948	
9	Odd Wang Sørensen	Norway	5	0–11	Ullevaal Stadion, Oslo	Friendly	August 6, 1948	
10	Luis de la Fuente	Mexico	3 – (37', 55', 58')	0–6	Estadio Olímpico de los Deportes, Mexico City	1949 NAFC Championship	September 4, 1949	
11	Horacio Casarín	Mexico	3 – (23', 41', 76)	2–6	Estadio Olímpico de los Deportes, Mexico City	1949 NAFC Championship	September 18, 1949	
12	Lawrie Reilly	Scotland	3 – (9', 11', 34')	0–6	Hampden Park, Glasgow	Friendly	April 30, 1952	
13	Salvador Reyes	Mexico	3 – (33', 69', 76')	0–6	Estadio Olímpico Universitario, Mexico City	1958 FIFA World Cup qualification	April 7, 1957	
14	Alfredo Hernández	Mexico	3 – (22', 36', 82')	2–7	Veterans Memorial Stadium, Long Beach, California	1958 FIFA World Cup qualification	April 28, 1957	
15	Bobby Charlton	England	3 – (64, 82' pen., 85')	1–8	Wrigley Field, Los Angeles	Friendly	May 28, 1959	
16	Roger Hunt	England	4 – (4', 22', 53', 64')	0–10	Downing Stadium, New York City	Friendly	May 27, 1964	
17	Fred Pickering	England	3 – (6', 47', 74')	0–10	Downing Stadium, New York City	Friendly	May 27, 1964	
18	Mordechai Spiegler	Israel	4 – (71', 79', 83', 89')	0–4	Temple Stadium, Philadelphia	Friendly	September 25, 1968	
19	Hugues Guillaume	Haiti	3	2–5	Stade Sylvio Cator, Port-au-Prince	Friendly	October 21, 1968	
20	Włodzimierz Lubański	Poland	3 – (17', 24', 84')	0–4	Stadion ŁKS, Łódź	Friendly	March 20, 1973	
21	Kazimierz Deyna	Poland	3 – (32', 67', 71')	0–7	Warta Stadion, Poznań	Friendly	March 26, 1975	
22	Bernard Lacombe	France	3 – (8', 14', 37')	0–6	Giants Stadium, East Rutherford, New Jersey	Friendly	May 7, 1979	
23	Ulf Kirsten	East Germany	3 – (17', 31', 66')	2–3	Sportforum Hohenschönhausen, East Berlin	Friendly	March 28, 1990	
24	Karl-Heinz Riedle	Germany	3 – (34', 39', 59')	3–4	Soldier Field, Chicago	1993 U.S. Cup	June 13, 1993	
25	Per Pedersen	Denmark	4 – (16', 26', 45', 55')	1–4	Rose Bowl, Pasadena, California	1997 U.S. Cup	January 22, 1997	
26	Nicklas Bendtner	Denmark	3 – (33', 83', 90+1')	2–3	Aarhus Idrætspark, Aarhus	Friendly	March 25, 2015	
