= Herman Graesser =

American soccer player

Herman Graesser (a.k.a. Herman Graeser) was a U.S. soccer player who earned one cap with the U.S. national team in a 4–0 loss to Scotland on June 19, 1949. He played his club soccer in the German American Soccer League. In 1950, he was with New York.
