= Julio Servin =

American soccer player

Julio (Julian) Servin was an American soccer defender who earned one cap with the U.S. national team in a 1–0 loss to Poland on August 3, 1973. Servin, and most of his teammates, were from the second division American Soccer League after the first division North American Soccer League refused to release players for the game.
