= Dan Califano =

American soccer player

Personal information
- Place of birth: Argentina
- Position: Defender

Senior career*
Years	Team	Apps	(Gls)
1975	San Antonio Thunder	8	(0)

International career
1973	United States	1	(0)
- * Club domestic league appearances and goals

Daniel Califano was a soccer player who played as a defender in the North American Soccer League. Born in Argentina, he earned one cap for the United States national team.

In Argentina, he played in 1966 three games for Club Ferro Carril Oeste in First Division.

== National team ==
Califano played his single game with the U.S. national team in a 1–0 win over Poland on August 3, 1973. He was replaced by Carmen Capurro in the 65th minute.

== Professional ==
Califano, and most of his teammates, were from the second division American Soccer League after the first division North American Soccer League (NASL) refused to release players for the game. In 1975, he signed with the San Antonio Thunder of the NASL.
