= Henry Noga =

American soccer player

Henry Noga was a U.S. soccer goalkeeper who earned two caps with the U.S. national team. Both games, which were World Cup qualifiers, came in November 1960. The first was a 3–3 tie with Mexico on November 6. The second was a 3–0 loss to Mexico seven days later.
