= Moe Hoffman =

American soccer player

Mike "Moe" Hoffman was a U.S. soccer player who earned one cap with the U.S. national team in a 4–0 loss to Poland on August 10, 1973. He started the game, but came off for Dan Counce in the 55th minute.
