= Andy Cziotka =

Hungarian-American soccer player (1940–2008)

Personal information
- Full name: Andras Cziotka
- Date of birth: 11 November 1940
- Place of birth: Nyíregyháza, Hungary
- Date of death: 19 November 2008 (aged 68)
- Place of death: Gainesville, United States
- Height: 1.80 m (5 ft 11 in)
- Position: Midfielder

Senior career*
Years	Team	Apps	(Gls)
- United States New York Hungaria
- United States Newark Ukrainian Sitch
- United States Philadelphia Spartans
- United States Dallas Tornado
- United States Philadelphia Atoms

International career
1965	United States United States	4	(0)
- * Club domestic league appearances and goals

Andras "Andy" Cziotka (November 11, 1940 – November 19, 2008) was a Hungarian-American soccer midfielder who earned four caps with the U.S. national team in 1965.

== Club career ==
Cziotka spent several years in the German American Soccer League. He played the of the National Professional Soccer League.

== National team ==
In 1965, Cziotka was called up to the U.S. national team for the 1966 FIFA World Cup qualification games. All four games took place in March. The first, a 2–2 tie with Mexico took place on March 7. That was followed by a loss to Mexico, 1–0 win over Honduras and finally a 2–2 tie with Honduras on March 21. With a 1-2-1 record, the U.S. failed to qualify for the World Cup.
