= Leroy Franks =

American soccer player

Personal information
- Date of birth: December 22, 1936 (age 89)
- Place of birth: St. Louis, Missouri, U.S.
- Position: Goalkeeper

Senior career*
Years	Team	Apps	(Gls)
1955	Brehenys Soccer Club		
1956–1962	St. Louis Kutis		
1963	German Sports Club		

International career
1957	United States	1	(0)
- * Club domestic league appearances and goals

Leroy Franks is an American retired soccer goalkeeper who earned one cap with the U.S. national team in 1957.

== Club career ==
Franks graduated from C.B.C. High School in Clayton, Mo in 1955, where he was 1st team All-State three years. He also lettered in football, track and baseball. Franks also won five fights in 1954 Golden Gloves competition at 147 lbs.

He joined the Brehenys Soccer Team in 1956 and were Missouri Amateur Cup Finalist.

In 1957 Franks was a member of the Kutis Soccer Team, and played for them until 1963. During those years they dominated soccer in the United States, Winning five consecutive National Amateur Cups 1957–1961 and the Nation Challenge Cup in 1957

Franks was a St. Louis League All-Star in 1963.

In 1964 played for German Soccer Club.

Franks was inducted in St.Louis Soccer Hall of Fame in 1996

Franks was also a Missouri High School soccer referee for 15+ years

== National team ==
After Kutis won the 1957 National Cup, the US Football Association decided to call up the entire team to represent the U.S. in two World Cup qualification games. As a result, Franks earned one cap with the U.S. national team in a June 22, 1957 loss to Canada.

He was inducted into the St. Louis Soccer Hall of Fame in 1996.
