= Diego Kochen =

American soccer player (born 2006)

Personal information
- Full name: Diego Kochen Gamboa
- Date of birth: March 19, 2006 (age 20)
- Place of birth: Miami, Florida, US
- Height: 6 ft 3 in (1.90 m)
- Position: Goalkeeper

Team information
- Current team: Lyngby (on loan from Barcelona B)
- Number: 31

Youth career
- Weston
- West Pines United
- 2016–2019: Marcet Football Academy
- 2018–2019: TecnoFutbol CF
- 2019–2024: Barcelona

Senior career*
Years	Team	Apps	(Gls)
2024–	Barcelona B	37	(0)
2026–	→ Lyngby (loan)	9	(0)

International career^{‡}
2021–2022	United States U16	2	(0)
2022–2023	United States U17	5	(0)
2024	United States U19	2	(0)
2025	United States U20	5	(0)
2025–	United States U23	1	(0)
2026–	United States	4	(0)
- * Club domestic league appearances and goals as of October 1, 2026 ‡ National team caps and goals as of November 17, 2026

Diego Kochen Gamboa (born March 19, 2006) is an American professional soccer player who plays as a goalkeeper for Danish Superliga club Lyngby, on loan from Segunda Federación team Barcelona Atlètic, and the United States national team.

== Club career ==
Born in Miami, Florida, to a Peruvian mother and a Venezuelan father, Kochen started his career with the youth academy of Weston, initially starting his career as an outfield player, before switching to goalkeeper at the age of eight to cover for an ill teammate. He also played for West Pines United in Florida and, after his parents moved to Spain in 2018 for work-related reasons, he played for the Marcet Football University and their affiliate team TecnoFutbol CF.

Having progressed through Barcelona's La Masia academy, being at the club since 2019, he signed his first professional contract with the club in March 2022. On October 11, 2023, he was named by English newspaper The Guardian as one of the best players born in 2006 worldwide. Kochen was included in the senior squad for a friendly against Club América on December 22, 2023. He replaced Ander Astralaga in the 62nd minute.

On February 2, 2024, Barcelona reached an agreement with Kochen for a new contract until 2028. The deal was signed on March 19, his 18th birthday. He was officially promoted to Barcelona Atlètic for the remainder of the 2023–24 season, where he was assigned the number 24. He made his Barça Atlètic debut the following April 14 against Unionistas in a 4–1 away loss.

On 2 July 2026, Kochen joined Danish club Lyngby Boldklub on loan until June 30, 2027, with an option to buy for €1.5 million ($1.73 million).

== International career ==
Kochen has represented the United States at both youth and senior international levels. Prior to being cap-tied to the United States, he was eligible to represent Peru, Spain, and Venezuela as well. In January 2022, Diego received his first US YNT call-up for a training camp at IMG in Brandenton. On March 15, 2022, Kochen debuted for the United States under-17, going on to captain the team on occasion and receive a nomination for 2022 U.S. Soccer Young Male Player of the Year. He then made his debut for the United States under-19 on March 24, 2024, against England under-19, which resulted in a 3–2 win for the United States. He received his first call up to the senior United States men's national soccer team for the September 2024 international window.

In September 2025, Kochen was called up by the United States under-20s for the 2025 FIFA U-20 World Cup in Chile, but withdrew after being recalled by Barcelona following an injury sustained to first-choice goalkeeper Joan García.

He was one of the 28 players were called up with the United States national team by head coach Mauricio Pochettino for friendly matches against Peru, Chile, Mexico, and Canada on September 26 and 29 and October 3 and 6, 2026 respectively.

On September 26, 2026, Kochen made his senior team debut with the United States, playing the second half of the United States' 4–1 win against Peru.

On October 3, Kochen made his first senior start with the United States, keeping a clean sheet in a 3-0 win against Mexico.

On November 14, Kochen got the start in the opening leg of the CONCACAF Nations League Quarterfinal against Haiti. By appearing in an official FIFA tournament, Kochen was cap-tied to the United States and no longer eligible for a call up to any other national team.

== Career statistics ==
=== Club ===
As of match played October 1, 2026

Appearances and goals by club, season and competition
Club	Season	League			National cup		Continental		Other		Total	
Club	Season	Division	Apps	Goals	Apps	Goals	Apps	Goals	Apps	Goals	Apps	Goals
Barcelona B	2023–24	Primera Federación	1	0	—		—		—		1	0
Barcelona B	2024–25	Primera Federación	16	0	—		—		—		16	0
Barcelona B	2025–26	Segunda Federación	20	0	—		—		—		20	0
Barcelona B	Total		37	0	—		—		0	0	37	0
Lyngby	2026–27	SuperLiga	9	0	—		—		—		9	0
Career total			46	0	0	0	0	0	0	0	46	0

=== International ===
As of match played November 17, 2026

Appearances and goals by national team and year
National team	Year	Apps	Goals
United States	2026	4	0
Total		4	0

== Honors ==
Barcelona

- UEFA Youth League: 2024–25
