= Tibor Resznecki =

American soccer player

Tibor Resznecki is a former U.S. soccer defender who earned three caps with the U.S. national team in 1965.

== Club career ==
Resznecki career is difficult to follow from the available sources. In 1960, he played for the New York Hungarians of the German American Soccer League. The team won the league title that year. In 1965, he played a single season with the New Yorkers of the International Soccer League. Then, in 1967, he was with the New York Generals of the National Professional Soccer League. Today he is a member of the Los Angeles Soccer Club.

== National team ==
Resznecki's three games with the national team came in three World Cup qualifiers played in March 1965. The first two were losses to Mexico on March 7 and March 12. On March 17, Resznecki replaced Bayardo Abaunza in a 1–0 win over Honduras.
