= Bob Whitehead (soccer) =

American soccer player

Personal information
- Full name: Robert Whitehead

Senior career*
Years	Team	Apps	(Gls)
1950s	St. Louis Kutis S.C.		

International career
1957	United States	2	
- * Club domestic league appearances and goals

Robert “Bob” Whitehead was an American soccer player who spent time with St. Louis Kutis S.C. He also earned two caps with the U.S. national team in 1957.

== Club career ==
Whitehead played with St. Louis Kutis S.C. during the mid-1950s when they were a dominant U.S. team. Kutis won the 1957 Amateur Cup and National Challenge Cup. fWhitehead was inducted into the St. Louis Soccer Hall of Fame in 1984.

== National team ==
After Kutis won the 1957 National Cup, the US Football Association decided to call up the entire team to represent the U.S. in two World Cup qualification games. As a result, Whitehead earned two caps with the U.S. national team, both losses to Canada. The first was a 5–1 loss on June 22, 1957. The second game was a July 6 loss to Canada.
