= Victor Gerley =

American soccer player

Personal information
- Full name: Victor John Gerley
- Date of birth: 17 June 1943 (age 83)
- Position: Goalkeeper

Victor Gerley is an American former soccer goalkeeper who earned six caps with the U.S. national team between 1965 and 1968.

== National team ==
In 1965, the U.S. played four games, all qualification matches for the 1966 FIFA World Cup. Gerley started all four games as the U.S. went 1-1-2 and failed to qualify for the finals. Gerley kept one clean sheet when the U.S. defeated Honduras 1–0 on March 17, 1966. The U.S. national team had no games in 1967. By 1968, Gary DeLong had become the team's starting goalkeeper and Gerley played only two games, one as a second-half substitute. His last game with the national team came in a 5-2 exhibition loss to Haiti on October 21, 1968.

== Club career ==
Gerley played for New York Ukrainian of the German American Soccer League during the 1969–1970 season.
