= Edward Embarger =

American soccer player

Personal information
- Position: Defender

Senior career*
Years	Team	Apps	(Gls)
1952–1953	Philadelphia Americans		
1953–1955	Uhrik Truckers		
1955–1956	New York Americans		

International career
1954	United States MNT	2	(0)
- * Club domestic league appearances and goals

Edward Embarger was a U.S. soccer player who spent at least four seasons in the American Soccer League and earned two caps with the U.S. national team in 1954.

== Professional career ==
Embarger played with the Philadelphia Americans of the American Soccer League from at least 1952. The team was purchased by Uhrik Trucking Company during the 1953–1954 season and renamed Uhrik Truckers. In 1955, Embarger moved to the New York Americans.

== National team ==
Embarger earned two caps with the U.S. national team in January 1954. The first was a 4–0 loss to Mexico on January 10. The second was a 3–1 loss to Mexico four days later.
