= Ray Voltz =

American soccer player

Personal information
- Position: Goalkeeper

Senior career*
Years	Team	Apps	(Gls)
1936–1941	Philadelphia Passon		
1941–1943	Philadelphia Americans		

International career
1937	United States MNT	3	(0)
- * Club domestic league appearances and goals

Ray Voltz is a former U.S. soccer goalkeeper. He seven seasons in the American Soccer League and earned three caps with the United States in 1937.

== American Soccer League ==
Voltz played with Philadelphia Passon and Philadelphia Americans of the American Soccer League between 1936 and 1943. He won the ASL championship in 1942 with the Americans.

== National team ==
Voltz played three games with the national team in September 1937. All three games were blowout losses to Mexico.
