= Bill Deszofi =

American soccer player

Personal information
- Position: Defender

Senior career*
Years	Team	Apps	(Gls)
1967	Melbourne Hungaria		

International career
1973	United States	1	(0)
- * Club domestic league appearances and goals

Bill Deszofi was an American soccer player who played as a defender. He earned one cap for the United States national team in a 2–0 win over Canada on August 5, 1973. Dezsofi, and most of his team mates, were from the second division American Soccer League after the first division North American Soccer League refused to release players for the game.
