= Russ Murphy =

American soccer player

Russell “Russ” Murphy was a U.S. soccer player who spent time with St. Louis Kutis S.C. He also earned two caps with the U.S. national team in 1957.

== Club career ==
Murphy played with St. Louis Kutis S.C. during the mid-1950s when they were a dominant U.S. team. Kutis won the 1957 National Amateur Cup and National Challenge Cup. Murphy was inducted into the St. Louis Soccer Hall of Fame in 1984.

== National team ==
After Kutis won the 1957 National Cup, the US Football Association decided to call up the entire team to represent the U.S. in two World Cup qualification games. As a result, Murphy earned two caps with the U.S. national team, both losses to Canada. The first was a 5–1 loss on June 22, 1957. The second game was a July 6 loss to Canada.
