= Amiel Muniz =

American soccer player

Amelio “Amiel” or "Emil" Muniz (November 4, 1921 – July 23, 1994) was an American soccer forward who earned one cap with the U.S. national team. He spent his club career in the St. Louis leagues. He was born Amiel Cueto Muniz in Fairmont City, Illinois on November 4, 1921, and died July 23, 1994.

== Club career ==
Muniz spent at least seven seasons in the St. Louis leagues. In 1942, he was a St. Louis Municipal League All Star. He played for the St. Louis Raiders, scoring four goals, in the 1947–1948 season. The team came under sponsorship of Paul Schulte Pontiac for the 1948–1949 season, was named McMahon Motors for the 1949–1950 season, then back Raiders for the 1950–1951 season. He was inducted into the St. Louis Soccer Hall of Fame in 1978.

== National team ==
Muniz earned one cap with the U.S. national team in a 4–0 loss to Scotland on June 19, 1949.
