= Lou Yakopec =

American soccer player

Personal information
- Full name: Louis Yakopec
- Date of birth: July 18, 1926
- Date of death: June 27, 1996 (aged 69)
- Position: Defender

International career
Years	Team	Apps	(Gls)
1949–57	United States	2	

Louis “Lou” or “Sonny” Yakopec (July 18, 1926 – June 27, 1996) was an American soccer defender, University of Pittsburgh fullback and semi-professional third base baseball player who earned two caps with the U.S. national team and played twelve years for the Harmarville Hurricanes.

== Club career ==
In 1944, Yakopec graduated from Aspinwall High School where he played football and basketball. He was a member of the 1943 WPIAL Class B championship football team. He is a member of the school's Athletic Hall of Fame. He attended the University of Pittsburgh where he was the starting fullback on the Pittsburgh Panthers football team his freshman season. He left school after his freshman year and enlisted in the Army. He also played semi-professional baseball at third base. Yakopec spent twelve seasons with the Harmarville Hurricanes of the Keystone League of Western Pennsylvania from 1950 to 1962. Yacopec and his teammates won the 1952 and 1956 National Challenge Cup championships.

== National team ==
Yakopec earned two caps with the U.S. national team. The first was a 4–0 loss to Scotland on June 19, 1949. The second was an April 7, 1957 loss to Mexico in World Cup qualifying.

He later served as a police officer in Harmarville.
