= Miguel Malizewski =

Argentinian-American soccer player

Personal information
- Date of birth: September 10, 1948 (age 78)
- Place of birth: San Lorenzo, Santa Fe, Argentina
- Positions: Forward; midfielder

Senior career*
Years	Team	Apps	(Gls)
1968–1969	Baltimore Bays		

International career
1968	United States	3	(0)
- * Club domestic league appearances and goals

Miguel "Michael" Malizewski (also spelled Maliszewski) is an Argentine-American former soccer player. He spent two seasons in the North American Soccer League and earned three caps with the U.S. national team.

Malizewski's first two national team games came against Israel in September 1968. The first was a 3–3 tie and the second a 4–0 loss. His last game with the U.S. national team was a 1–0 loss to Haiti in a World Cup qualification match.

Malizewski spent two seasons, 1968 and 1969, with the Baltimore Bays in the North American Soccer League.
