= Bob O'Leary =

American soccer player

Personal information
- Full name: Robert O'Leary
- Date of birth: January 3, 1951
- Place of birth: St. Louis, Missouri, United States
- Date of death: December 30, 1993 (aged 42)
- Place of death: Orange County, California, United States
- Position: Midfielder

Youth career
- 1970–1971: Florissant Valley Community College
- 1972–1973: St. Louis University

Senior career*
Years	Team	Apps	(Gls)
1974–1977	St. Louis Stars	67	(3)
1978–1979	California Surf	25	(0)
1979–1980	New York Arrows (indoor)	1	(0)
1980–1981	St. Louis Steamers (indoor)	0	(0)

International career
1973	United States	1	(0)

Managerial career
- ?: UC Irvine Anteaters (assistant)
- 1987–1993: Pateadores Soccer Club
- * Club domestic league appearances and goals

Robert O'Leary (January 3, 1951 – December 30, 1993) was an American soccer player who earned one cap with the U.S. national team. He also spent six seasons in the North American Soccer League and two in the Major Indoor Soccer League.

== High school and college ==
O'Leary attended De Andreis High School. He then attended Florissant Valley Community College where he was a 1970–1971 junior college All American. He then transferred to St. Louis University where he played on the men's soccer team. In 1972, the Billikens won the NCAA championship.

== National team ==
O'Leary earned one cap with the U.S. national team in a 1–0 loss to Poland on August 3, 1973. He came on at halftime for Emmanuel Georges.

== Professional ==
O'Leary signed with the St. Louis Stars in 1974. In 1978, the Stars moved to California where it was renamed the California Surf. He remained with the Surf until he retired in 1979. In the fall of 1979, he signed with the New York Arrows of Major Indoor Soccer League. He moved to the St. Louis Steamers for the 1980–1981 season, but played no first-team games. He retired at the end of the season.

== Coaching career ==
O'Leary began his coaching career as an assistant coach at the University of California, Irvine. He was Head Coach and Director of the Pateadores Soccer Club (Mission Viejo, California) from its inception in 1987.
