= John McEwan (soccer) =

American soccer player

John McEwan was an American soccer player who earned two caps, scoring three goals, as a member of the U.S. national team in 1937.

== College ==
McEwan attended Syracuse University where he was a two-year soccer letterman on the school's soccer team. He was a co-captain and first team All American of the 1932 Orange Men team which went 4–2.

== ASL ==
In 1935, McEwan scored nine goals for Brooklyn Celtic of the American Soccer League (ASL). That year, he was a member of an ASL All Star team which unofficially represented the U.S. in two games with Scotland. Scotland won the first game 4-1 and the second 5–1. McEwan scored the ASL All Star goal in the second game.

== National team ==
In 1937, McEwan was called up to the U.S. national team for three games with Mexico in Mexico City. Mexico won all three games, but McEwan scored a goal in both the September 12 and 19 losses.
