= Billy Wilson (American soccer) =

American soccer player

Personal information
- Full name: William Wilson
- Position: Fullback

Senior career*
Years	Team	Apps	(Gls)
1925–1926	New Bedford Whalers	56	(0)
1926–1927	Brooklyn Wanderers	24	(0)
1927–1928	New York Nationals	27	(0)
1930–1931	New Bedford Whalers	29	(0)

International career
1925	United States	2	(0)
- * Club domestic league appearances and goals

William Wilson was a U.S. soccer fullback who spent six seasons in the American Soccer League and earned two caps with the U.S. national team.

== American Soccer League ==
In 1924, Wilson signed with the New Bedford Whalers of the American Soccer League. While he began the 1926–1927 season with the Whalers, he played only one game, then transferred to the Brooklyn Wanderers. At the end of the season, he moved to the New York Nationals for the 1927–1928 season. There is a gap in his career for the next two years which may be accounted for if he played in the Eastern Professional Soccer League. Regardless, Wilson was back in the ASL in 1930 with the New Bedford Whalers. He left the ASL permanently in 1931.

== National team ==
His first game with the national team in a 6–1 win over Canada on November 8, 1925. His second came almost exactly a year later in a 6–2 win over Canada on November 6, 1926.
