= Marko Vuckovic =

American soccer player

Marko Vučković
Personal information
- Full name: Marko Vučković
- Place of birth: United States
- Position: Defender

International career
Years	Team	Apps	(Gls)
1973	United States	1	(0)

Marko Vučković (some sources spell as Vukovic) was an American soccer defender who earned one cap with the U.S. national team in a 1–0 loss to Poland on August 12, 1973. He came on for Bobby Smith in the 60th minute. Vuckovic, and most of his team mates, were from the second division American Soccer League after the first division North American Soccer League refused to release players for the game.
