= Ed Ruddy =

American soccer player

Edward Ruddy was a U.S. soccer left fullback who played eighteen seasons in the American Soccer League. He also earned two caps with the U.S. national team in 1937.

== American Soccer League ==
Ruddy began his professional career in 1933 with the Kearny Scots. He was with Brooklyn Hispano from at least 1938 to 1943 when he won the league title with Brooklyn. He also played with the Brooklyn Wanderers, Brookhattan and in 1950 signed with the Kearny Irish. He retired from playing professionally in 1951.

== National team ==
Ruddy earned two caps with the U.S. national team in 1937. Both of his caps came in losses to Mexico in September 1937. The first was a 7–2 loss on September 12 and the second a 7–3 loss seven days later.
