= Bob Rooney (soccer) =

American soccer player

Robert "Bob" Rooney was a U.S. soccer center forward who spent his playing career in the St. Louis leagues. He also earned two caps with the U.S. national team in 1957.

== Personal ==
Rooney grew up in the Dogtown area of St. Louis, attending St. James Grade School and St. Louis University High School. As a youth, he played both football and baseball in addition to soccer spending five seasons with a St. Louis Cardinals farm team. Even while playing in the local St. Louis soccer leagues, Rooney earned a living as a St. Louis policeman.

== Club career ==
Rooney played for the St. James the Greater Grade School boys' soccer team in the CYC league in 1945. and for St. Louis Kutis S.C. during the mid-1950s when they were a dominant U.S. team. Kutis won the 1957 National Amateur Cup and National Challenge Cup. He was inducted into the St. Louis Soccer Hall of Fame in 1984.

== National team ==
After Kutis won the 1957 National Cup, the US Football Association decided to call up the entire team to represent the U.S. in two World Cup qualification games. As a result, Rooney earned two caps with the U.S. national team, both losses to Canada. The first was a 5–1 loss on June 22, 1957. The second game was a July 6 loss to Canada.
