= Tom Schultz (soccer) =

American soccer player

Tom Schultz was a U.S. soccer player who earned one cap with the U.S. national team in a 6–3 loss to England on June 8, 1953. He lasted 29 minutes before an ankle injury forced a substitution. He played his club soccer with St. Louis Kutis S.C. and was inducted into the St. Louis Soccer Hall of Fame in 1992. He died on 15 May 2023.
