= Mike Ivanow =

American soccer player

Personal information
- Full name: Michael Ivanow
- Date of birth: January 9, 1948 (age 78)
- Place of birth: Shanghai, China
- Height: 6 ft 4 in (1.93 m)
- Position: Goalkeeper

Youth career
- University of San Francisco

Senior career*
Years	Team	Apps	(Gls)
1974–1976	San Jose Earthquakes	42	(0)
1976–1981	Seattle Sounders	35	(0)
1979–1980	Wichita Wings (indoor)	14	(0)
1980–1981	Seattle Sounders (indoor)	15	(0)
1981–1982	San Jose Earthquakes	0	(0)
1984–1985	Wichita Wings (indoor)	8	(0)

International career
1973–1975	United States	10	(0)
- * Club domestic league appearances and goals

Mike Ivanow (born January 9, 1948) is an American retired soccer goalkeeper born in Shanghai, China. He spent eight seasons in the North American Soccer League and was a member of the U.S. soccer team at the 1972 Summer Olympics. He also earned ten caps with the U.S. national team between 1973 and 1975.

Ivanow attended the University of San Francisco where he played collegiate soccer under renowned coach Steve Negoesco. In 1968, he was an honorable mention as an All American.

In 1967, Ivanow played both Olympic qualifying matches against Bermuda. The U.S. tied Bermuda in Bermuda on May 21. Six days later, it lost in Chicago when Ivanow and his team mates thought the referee had awarded Bermuda an indirect free kick only to discover their mistake as Gladwys Daniels easily scored. Ivanow made it to the Olympics five years later when he was a member of the U.S. team at the 1972 Munich games. He played the first two games, but Shep Messing replaced him in goal for the third game, against host West Germany. In 1973, Ivanow earned his first cap with the senior national team when he came on for Mike Winter in a 4–0 loss to Bermuda. He went on to play another seven games that year and one in 1974. His last cap came in a 7–0 loss to Poland on March 26, 1975.

In 1974, Ivanow became the San Jose Earthquakes (NASL) starting goalkeeper. In 1975, Ivanow played much of the season injured which dropped his GAA from the 1974 1.53 to 2.15. In 1976, he resumed his outstanding play before falling out of favor with the San Jose front office. He was transferred to the Seattle Sounders after six games. In Seattle, he was the backup goalkeeper to Tony Chursky. In 1977, Ivanow continued to back up Chursky, but came on for Chursky 17 minutes into the Sounders first post-season game, a victory over Vancouver. He started both games in the series with Minnesota, shutting out the Kicks on August 17. However, Chursky was back in the net for the rest of the post-season, including the Sounders’ loss to the New York Cosmos in the 1977 Soccer Bowl. In 1978, Ivanow never made a game-day squad, However, in January 1979, the Sounders traded Chursky to the California Surf for Al Trost. That year, Ivanow came alive, playing 28 games and finishing the season ranked fourth in the league. He was also the primary keeper during the Sounders' 1980-1981 indoor season. He played 15 of the team's 18 games and sixth in the goalkeeper standings. By the 1981 outdoor season, Ivanow was fading. His weight was increasing, decreasing his mobility and he found competition from Paul Hammond who was taking over in goal. At the end of the season, Ivanow retired from the Sounders and the NASL.

Besides playing soccer, Ivanow has been involved in numerous businesses including co-founding and managing a credit union in San Francisco during his time playing with the Earthquakes. Today he is the sales manager for Jaguar of Bellevue.
