= John Dubienny =

American soccer player

Johnny Dubienny
Personal information
- Full name: John Dimitrius Dubienny
- Date of birth: May 28, 1908
- Place of birth: Fall River, MA
- Date of death: December 27, 1967 (aged 59)
- Place of death: Andover, Massachusetts
- Height: 5 ft 10 in (1.78 m)
- Position: Wing half

Senior career*
Years	Team	Apps	(Gls)
1928	Fall River F.C.	6	(2)
1929	Boston Soccer Club	3	(0)

International career
1937	United States	3	(0)
- * Club domestic league appearances and goals

John Dubienny (May 28, 1908 – December 1967) was an American soccer wing half. In 1937, he earned three caps with the U.S. national team. All three games came in losses to Mexico in September 1937. He spent one season in the American Soccer League, beginning the 1928–1929 season with the Fall River F.C. and ending it with the Boston Soccer Club.
