= Florid =

Florid may refer to:

- Florid, Illinois, US, an unincorporated community
- Great Wall Florid, a car
- Florid (film), a 2026 British drama film

== See also ==
- Florid cutaneous papillomatosis, a paraneoplastic syndrome
- Florid music or coloratura, elaborate melody in operatic singing
