= Carmen Capurro =

American soccer player (born 1948)

Personal information
- Full name: Carmelo Nick Capurro
- Date of birth: January 14, 1948 (age 78)
- Position: Striker

Senior career*
Years	Team	Apps	(Gls)
1972–1975	Cincinnati Comets		

International career
1973	United States	2	(0)
- * Club domestic league appearances and goals

Carmen Capurro (born January 14, 1948) is a former American soccer player who earned two caps with the U.S. national team. He also played for the short lived Cincinnati Comets.

== International career ==
His first game with the national team was a 1–0 loss to Poland on August 3, 1973. He came in for Dan Califano in the 65th minute. His second game was two days later, a 2–0 win over Canada. He came in for Mark Liveric.
