= Frederick Scardina =

American soccer player

Frederick “Fritz” Scardina was a U.S. soccer player who earned one cap with the U.S. national team in a 2–2 tie with Canada on August 29, 1972, in a 1974 World Cup qualification match in Baltimore.

He was inducted into the Maryland Soccer Hall of Fame in 2000.
