= Derek Nash (soccer) =

American soccer player

Derek (Dereck) George Nash (October 20, 1930 – October 5, 2017) was an American soccer player who earned one cap with the U.S. national team in a 3–2 loss to Iceland on August 25, 1955.

Nash was born on October 20, 1930, in Tredegar, Wales, and emigrated to the United States. He died in Gainesville, Florida on October 5, 2017 at the age of 86.
