= Donald Cogsville =

American soccer player

Donald P. Cogsville
Personal information
- Full name: Donald P. Cogsville
- Place of birth: New York, New York, United States
- Positions: Forward; midfielder; defender

Youth career
- 1984–1988: UNC-Chapel Hill

Senior career*
Years	Team	Apps	(Gls)
1988–1990	San Diego Sockers (indoor)	35	(1)

International career
1988	United States	6	(0)
- * Club domestic league appearances and goals

Donald P. Cogsville (born in New York, New York) is a former U.S. soccer player who earned six caps with the U.S. national team in 1988. He is currently the Chief Executive Officer of The Cogsville Group, LLC, a New York City-based real estate investment firm focused on commercial real estate assets.

== Youth and college ==
Cogsville, the son of Donald J. Cogsville, former president of the Harlem Urban Development Corporation, was raised in Trenton, New Jersey and attended Princeton Day School. After graduating in 1984, he attended the University of North Carolina at Chapel Hill (UNC-Chapel Hill). He was part of the UNC Tar Heels soccer team from 1984 to 1988. During his four seasons at UNC, Cogsville played several positions, including defender in 1987 and forward in 1988. He was inducted into the Princeton Day School Hall of Fame in 1997.

== National team ==
Cogsville earned his first cap with the U.S. national team on 10 January 1988 in a loss to Guatemala. Over the next six months, he played five more times as either a defender or defensive midfielder. His last cap came in a 1–0 victory over Costa Rica on 14 June 1988.

== Professional career ==
In 1988 Cogsville entered the professional ranks with the San Diego Sockers of the Major Indoor Soccer League (MISL) after graduating from UNC. He played only two seasons before knee injuries forced him to retire in 1990.

== Investment professional ==
After retiring from playing, Cogsville studied law at Rutgers University and began a Wall Street career as a corporate attorney at Skadden Arps and an investment banker with the Global Leveraged Finance Group at Merrill Lynch. In 2002, Cogsville founded RCM Saratoga Capital, LLC, a boutique investment banking firm focused on generating value in the urban marketplace. RCM Saratoga Capital supported the growth of several notable companies, including the incubation of MatchPoint Trading, Inc.

In January 2006, Cogsville founded The Cogsville Group to acquire distressed commercial real estate assets. In December 2008, the firm won the bidding for Starrett City, the nation's largest subsidized apartment complex. In July 2010, the firm was the first minority-owned firm to acquire a distressed commercial real estate loan portfolio from the Federal Deposit Insurance Corporation. The $1.8B sale was the second largest in the FDIC's History. In December 2010, the firm acquired two additional loan portfolios with $341M of commercial loans. In January 2011, the firm acquired a fourth portfolio with $820M of construction loans.
