= Donald Malinowski (soccer) =

American soccer player

Pug Malinowski
Personal information
- Full name: Donald Malinowski
- Place of birth: United States
- Position: Goalkeeper

Senior career*
Years	Team	Apps	(Gls)
1950–1953	Harmarville Hurricanes		
1953–1954	Castle Shannon		
1956–1962	Harmarville Hurricanes		

International career
1954–1955	United States	4	(0)
- * Club domestic league appearances and goals

Donald "Pug" Malinowski is an American former soccer goalkeeper who earned four caps with the U.S. national team in 1954 and 1955.

== Club career ==
Malinowski grew up in Harmarville, Pennsylvania, where he played soccer with two local amateur teams, the Harmarville Hurricanes and Castle Shannon of the western Pennsylvania Keystone League from 1950 to 1962. Malinowski began his career with the Hurricanes before moving to Shannon for the 1953–1954 season. He was back with the Hurricanes in August 1954. Malinowski and the Hurricanes won the 1952 and 1956 National Challenge Cup. They were also runner up in 1953. Malinowski and his team mates also won the league title in 1951, 1953, 1954 and 1957.

== National team ==
Malinowski earned four caps with the U.S. national team in 1954 and 1955. In 1954, he was the goalkeeper for the U.S. team in three qualifiers for the 1954 FIFA World Cup. The U.S. went 2–1 in those three qualifiers (including one shutout), but failed to qualify for the finals based on a 2–2 record. His last cap came in a loss to Iceland on August 25, 1955.
