= Richard Wild (soccer) =

American soccer player

Personal information
- Position: Forward

Senior career*
Years	Team	Apps	(Gls)
1963–1965	New York Hota		

International career
1964	United States	1	(0)
- * Club domestic league appearances and goals

Richard Wild was an American soccer player who earned one cap with the U.S. national team in a 10–0 loss to England on May 27, 1964. In 1964, he played with New York Hota of the German American Soccer League.
