= Gary DeLong =

American soccer player

Personal information
- Position: Goalkeeper

Senior career*
Years	Team	Apps	(Gls)
1968	Vancouver Royals	9	(0)

International career
1968–1969	United States	6	(0)
- * Club domestic league appearances and goals

Gary DeLong is an American former soccer goalkeeper.

In 1958, DeLong graduated from Balboa High School in San Francisco, California where he was a 1958 All State/San Francisco Section soccer player. He is a member of the San Francisco Prep Hall of Fame. In 1968, he played nine games for the Vancouver Royals of the North American Soccer League. That year, he also earned six caps with the U.S. national team. His first game came in a 3–3 tie with Israel on September 15, 1968. He was also in goal for the 4–0 loss to Israel ten days later. He played three 1970 FIFA World Cup qualification games that year, a loss to Canada on October 17 and two victories over Bermuda on November 2 and 10.
