= Adolph Bachmeier =

American-Romanian soccer player

Personal information
- Full name: Adolph Bachmeier
- Date of birth: October 13, 1937
- Place of birth: Caramurat, Constanța County, Romania
- Date of death: July 21, 2016 (aged 78)
- Place of death: Des Plaines, Illinois, United States
- Positions: Midfielder; defender

Senior career*
Years	Team	Apps	(Gls)
–1968	Chicago Kickers		
1968	Chicago Mustangs	29	(5)
1969–	Chicago Kickers		

International career
1959–1969	United States	15	(0)
- * Club domestic league appearances and goals

Adolph (Adolf) Bachmeier (October 13, 1937 – July 21, 2016) was a U.S.-Romanian soccer player. He spent most of his playing career with various teams in Chicago. He also earned fifteen caps with the U.S. national team between 1959 and 1969. He was inducted into the National Soccer Hall of Fame in 2002.

== Professional career ==
Bachmeier was born in Romania but spent his playing career in Chicago. He played as either a defender or defensive midfielder for the Chicago Kickers of the National Soccer League of Chicago beginning in the 1950s. In 1965, Bachmeier was honored as the Sepp Herberger German-American Illinois soccer player of the year. In 1966 and 1968, the Kickers won the National Amateur Cup. In 1968, he joined the Chicago Mustangs of the North American Soccer League (NASL). Bachmeier and the Mustangs spent only a single season in the NASL. In 1969, he returned to the Kickers, winning the National Amateur Cup a third time with them in 1970.

== National team ==
Bachmeier earned his first caps with the U.S. national team in a crushing 8–1 loss to England on May 28, 1959. That was the only U.S. game in 1959 and Bachmeier was not called up for either of the U.S. games in 1960. However, he returned to the lineup in 1961 for the only U.S. game that year, a loss to Colombia. Once again, Bachmeier had a multi-year lay off from the national team. His next appearance came in a March 7, 1965, tie with Mexico. He earned two more caps that year, but the U.S. team was inactive in 1966 and 1967. In 1968, Bachmeier finally became a regular, and team captain, on the national team as he earned eight of his caps that year. The U.S. entered the qualification rounds for the 1970 FIFA World Cup that year. He finished his national team career with two more caps in 1969, both loses to Haiti. Those losses put the U.S. out of contention for the World Cup.

In addition to his games with the senior U.S. team, Bachmeier was also a member of the 1963 Pan American team which went 0–4 at those games. In 1964, he was also part of the U.S. team which attempted, but failed, to qualify for the 1964 Summer Olympics.

He was inducted into the Illinois Soccer Hall of Fame in 1984, the National Soccer Hall of Fame in 2002 and the USASA Hall of Fame in 2007.
