= List of Hungarian Jews =

This is a list of Hungarian Jews. There has been a Jewish presence in today's Hungary since Roman times (bar a brief expulsion during the Black Death), long before the actual Hungarian nation. Jews fared particularly well under the Ottoman Empire, and after emancipation in 1867. At its height, the Jewish population of historical Hungary numbered more than 900,000, but the Holocaust and emigration, especially during the 1956 Hungarian Revolution, has reduced that to around 100,000, most of whom live in Budapest and its suburbs.

This is a list of anyone who could be reliably described as "Hungarian" and is of significant Jewish heritage (ethnic or religious). See List of Hungarian Americans for descendants of Hungarian émigrés born in America, a significant number of whom are of Jewish ancestry.

The names are presented in the Western European convention of the given name preceding the family name, whereas in Hungary, the reverse is true, as in most Asian cultures.

== Historical figures ==
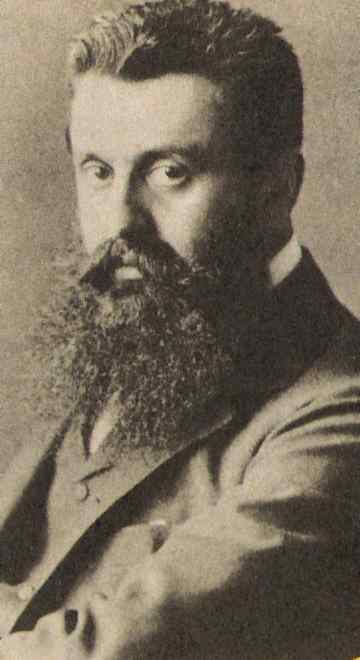
Theodor Herzl

- Leó Frankel, one of the leaders of the Paris Commune
- Gyula Germanus, islamologist, (non-Jewish mother, Jewish father)
- Ignác Goldziher, islamologist
- Tivadar Herzl (Theodor Herzl), "the spiritual father of the Jewish State". (Note: In the Israeli Declaration of Independence, Theodor Herzl is officially referred to as "the spiritual father of the Jewish State".)
- Béla Kun, de facto leader of Hungary for 4 months in 1919 (non-Jewish mother, Jewish father)
- Max Nordau, co-founder of the World Zionist Organization
- Tom Lantos
- György Lukács
- Trebitsch Lincoln, British adventurer
- Georges Politzer
- Joseph Pulitzer, newspaper publisher
- Sándor Radó (Alexander Radó) Switzerland-based Soviet master spy in World War II
- Mátyás Rákosi, de facto leader of Hungary, 1947–1956
- Ervin Szabó director of the Budapest Public Library System, 1911–1918
- Tibor Szamuely, politician
- Ármin Vámbéry, orientalist and traveler
- Vilmos Vázsonyi, first Jewish Justice minister of Hungary, 1917–1918
- Félix Somló, legal scholar known for his contributions to the Hungarian Legal Philosophy, 1873–1920
- Ludwig Wysber, (1817-?) journalist

== Athletes ==
=== Boxing ===
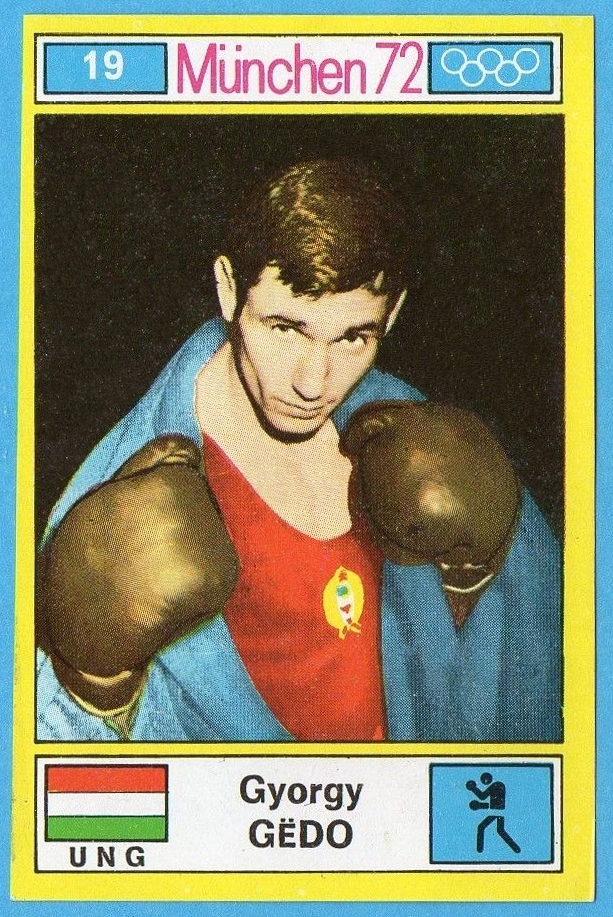
György Gedó

- György Gedó, Olympic champion light flyweight

=== Canoeing ===
- László Fábián, sprint canoer, Olympic champion (K-2 10,000 meter), 4× world champion (3× K-2 10,000 meter and 1× K-4 10,000 meter) and one silver (K-4 10,000 meter)
- Imre Farkas, sprint canoer, 2× Olympic bronze (C-2 1,000 and 10,000 meter)
- Klára Fried-Bánfalvi, sprint canoer, Olympic bronze (K-2 500 m), world champion (K-2 500 m)
- Anna Pfeffer, sprint canoer, Olympic 2× silver (K-2 500 m), bronze (K-1 500 m); world champion (K-2 500 m), silver (K-4 500 m), 2× bronze (K-2 500)

=== Fencing ===
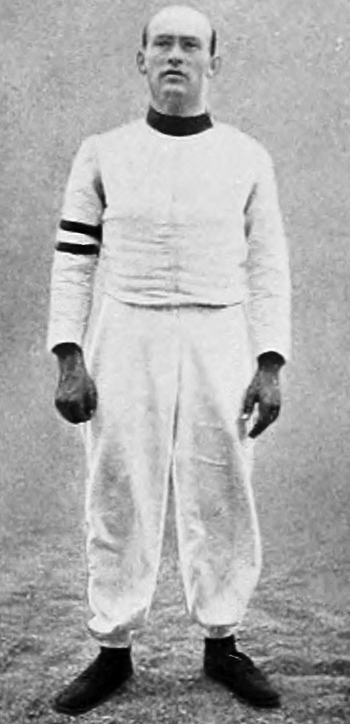
Jenő Fuchs

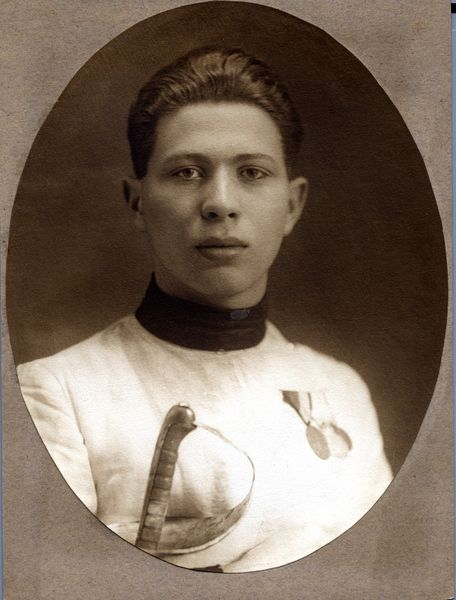
Attila Petschauer

- Péter Bakonyi (born "Buchwald", 1938), saber, Olympic 3× bronze
- Ilona Elek (née "Schacherer"; 1907–1988), foil fencer; Olympic gold-medal winner, and world champion, both before and after World War II
- Dr. Dezső Földes (1880–1950), saber, 2× Olympic champion
- Dr. Jenő Fuchs (1882–1955), saber, 4× Olympic champion
- Tamás Gábor (1932–2007), épée, Olympic champion
- János Garay (1889–1945), saber, Olympic champion, silver, bronze, killed by the Nazis
- Dr. Oskar Gerde (1883–1944), saber, 2× Olympic champion, killed by the Nazis
- Dr. Sándor Gombos (1895–1968), saber, Olympic champion
- Endre Kabos (1906–1944), saber, 3× Olympic champion, bronze, killed while performing forced labour for the Nazis
- Attila Petschauer (1904–1943), saber, 2× team Olympic champion, silver, killed by the Nazis
- Zoltán Ozoray Schenker (1880–1966), Hungarian Olympic champion saber fencer
- Ildikó Újlaky-Rejtő (born 1937), foil, 2× Olympic champion
- Lajos Werkner (1883–1943), saber, 2× Olympic champion
- George Worth, born György Woittitz (1915–2006), Hungarian-born American Olympic medalist fencer

=== Figure skating ===
- Lily Kronberger, World Championship 4× gold, 2× bronze, World Figure Skating Hall of Fame
- Emília Rotter, pair skater, World Championship 4× gold, silver, 2× Olympic bronze
- László Szollás, pair skater, World Championship gold, silver, 2× Olympic bronze

=== Gymnastics ===
- Samu Fóti, Olympic silver (team combined exercises)
- Imre Gellért, Olympic silver (team combined exercises)
- Ágnes Keleti, 5-time Olympic champion (2-time floor exercises, asymmetrical bars, floor exercises, balance beam, team exercise with portable apparatus), 3-time silver (2-time team combined exercises, individual combined exercises), 2× bronze (asymmetrical bars, team exercises with portable apparatus), International Gymnastics Hall of Fame
- Alice Kertész, Olympic champion (team, portable apparatus), silver (team); world silver (team)

=== Soccer (association football) ===
- Gyula Bíró, midfielder/forward (national team)
- Alfréd Brüll, first owner of MTK Budapest FC
- Peter Fuzes, born in Hungary; soccer goalkeeper for Sydney Hakoah club and Australia, Maccabi Hall of Fame 2003. Played 1st grade 1964 till 1976; International career from 1966 to 1972, against Scotland 1967, Greece 1969, Israel 1969 & 1972. Played against various European club sides including AS ROMA 1966, Manchester United.
- Sándor Geller, goalkeeper, Olympic champion
- Béla Guttmann, midfielder, national team player, and international coach
- Adolf Kertész, Hungarian international
- Gyula Kertész (1888–1982), Hungarian international
- Vilmos Kertész (1890–1962), Hungarian international
- Gyula Mándi, half back (player & coach of Hungarian and Israeli national teams) and manager
- Árpád Orbán, Olympic champion

=== Swimming ===
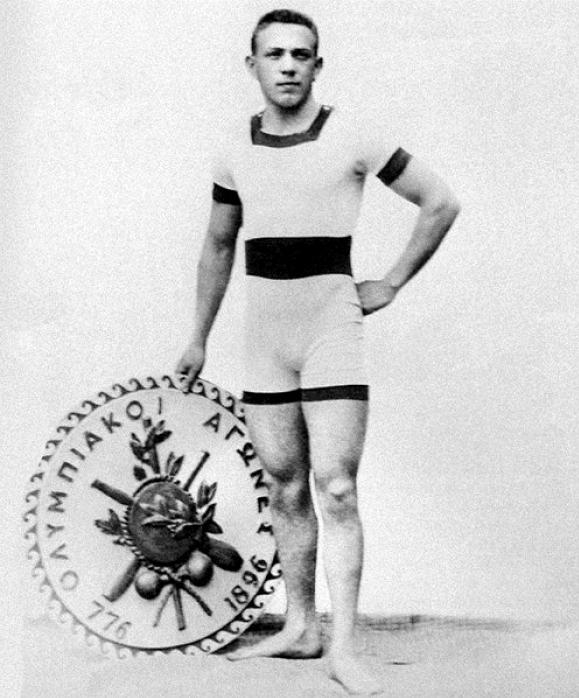
Alfréd Hajós

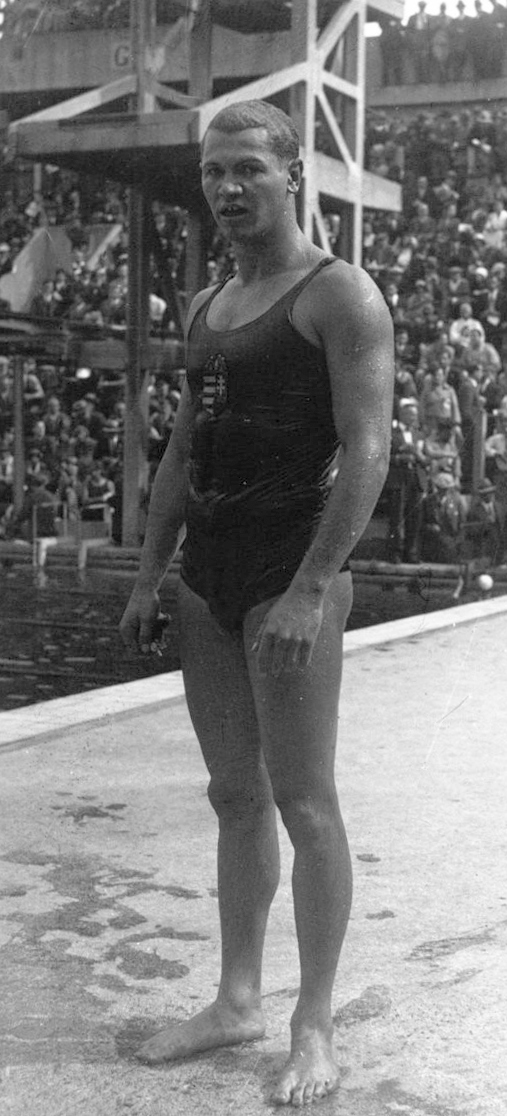
András Székely

- Andrea Gyarmati, Olympic silver (100-m backstroke) and bronze (100-m butterfly); world championships bronze (200-m backstroke), International Swimming Hall of Fame (both parents half-Jewish)
- Alfréd Hajós (born "Arnold Guttmann"), 3× Olympic champion (100-m freestyle, 800-m freestyle relay, 1,500-m freestyle), International Swimming Hall of Fame
- Michael "Miki" Halika, Israel, 200-m butterfly, 200- and 400-m individual medley
- József Munk, Olympic silver (4x200-m freestyle relay)
- Rebecca Soni, her grandfather was born in Nagyvárad (now Oradea)
- Mark Spitz, his great-grandfather (Nathan) was born in Hungary
- László Szabados, Olympic bronze (4x200-m freestyle relay)
- András Székely, Olympic silver (200-m breaststroke) and bronze (4x200-m freestyle relay); died in a Nazi concentration camp
- Éva Székely, Olympic champion & silver (200-m breaststroke); International Swimming Hall of Fame; mother of Andrea Gyarmati (mother Jewish, father Roman Catholic szekler)
- Judit Temes, Olympic champion (4×100-m freestyle), bronze (100-m freestyle)
- Imre Zachár, Olympic silver (4x200-m freestyle relay)

=== Table tennis ===
- Viktor Barna (born "Győző Braun"), 22-time world champion, International Table Tennis Foundation Hall of Fame ("ITTFHoF")
- Laszlo Bellak, 7-time world champion, ITTFHoF
- Anna Sipos, 11-time world champion, ITTFHoF
- Miklós Szabados, 15-time world champion
- Tibor Hazi
- Magda Gal

=== Tennis ===
- Zsuzsa Körmöczy, won 1958 French Open Singles, world # 2.

=== Track and field ===
- Ödön Bodor, Olympic bronze (medley relay)
- Ibolya Csák, Olympic champion & European champion high jumper
- Mór Kóczán, javelin, Olympic bronze (Calvinist priest)

=== Water polo ===
- Robert Antal, Olympic champion
- István Barta, Olympic champion, gold
- György Bródy, (3g1b & 2g & 2g), goalkeeper, 2-time Olympic champion
- Dezső Gyarmati, Olympic water polo player & captain (3g1s1b) (half Jewish)
- György Kárpáti, 3-time Olympic champion, 1 time bronze (half Jewish)
- Béla Komjádi water polo player and coach, International Swimming Hall of Fame
- Mihály Mayer, 2-time Olympic champion, 2-time bronze
- Miklós Sárkány, 2-time Olympic champion
- Iván Somlai, 1976 Olympic Assistant Coach and Game Plan Manager of Team Canada

=== Wrestling ===
- Károly Kárpáti (also "Károly Kellner"), Olympic champion (freestyle lightweight), silver

=== Other sports ===
- Paul Havas, Columbia quarterback
- Ferenc Kemény, co-founder and first secretary of the IOC
- László Bartók, Rowing (Paris 1924 eight and coxed four, Amsterdam 1928 coxed four) and 1932 men's coxless four European Rowing Champion

== Olympic gold medalists at the Summer Games ==
Period	1896-1912	1924-1936	1948-1956	1960-1972	1976-1992 (1984 excluded)	1996-2008
# of Olympics	5	4	3	4	4	4
Total Golds	442	482	440	684	903	1172
Hungarian Golds	11	22	35	32	33	26
Hungarian/total World	2.49%	4.56%	7.95%	4.68%	3.65%	2.22%
Hungarian Individual Gold	9	17	26	22	27	16
Hungarian Jewish Individual	5	3	6	4	0	0
Jewish/total individual Hungarian	55.56%	17.65%	23.08%	18.18%	0%	0%
Jews in Gold Teams	57.14% = 8/14	28.21%= 11/39				
Jews in population	5.0% (1910)	5.12% (1930)	1.45% (1949)			0.13% (2001)

=== Before the Holocaust ===
Hungarian Jews, while comprising some 5% of the population of Hungary, won 8 individual gold medals for Hungary out of 26 (30.8%) in the Olympic sports events between 1896 and 1936. In each of the 7 gold winning teams, there were Hungarian Jews making up 35.8% of the teams (19 out of 53 team members).

==== 1896 ====
- Alfréd Hajós-Guttman (2) swimming, 100-meter freestyle, 1,500-meter freestyle

==== 1906 ====
- Alfréd Hajós-Guttman, swimming, 800-meter freestyle relay

==== 1908 ====
- Dezső Földes, fencing, team saber
- Dr.Jenő Fuchs (2), fencing, individual saber, team saber
- Dr. Oszkár Gerde, fencing, team saber
- Lajos Werkner, fencing, team saber
- Richard Weisz, Greco-Roman wrestling, heavyweight

==== 1912 ====
- Dezső Földes, fencing, team saber
- Dr. Jenő Fuchs (2), fencing, individual saber, team saber
- Dr. Oszkár Gerde, fencing, team saber
- Lajos Werkner, fencing, team saber

==== 1924 ====
- Alfred Hajós, Olympic art competition, architecture
- Gyula Halasy, Gold Medal, Individual Trap Competition

==== 1928 ====
- János Garay, fencing, team saber
- Dr. Sándor Gombos, fencing, team saber
- Attila Petschauer, fencing, team saber
- Dr. Ferenc Mező, Olympic art competition, epic works

==== 1932 ====
- István Barta, water polo
- György Brody, water polo
- Miklós Sárkány, water polo
- Endre Kabos, fencing, team saber
- Attila Petschauer, fencing, team saber

==== 1936 ====
- György Bródy, water polo
- Miklos Sárkány, water polo
- Endre Kabos (2), fencing, individual saber, team saber
- Ilona Elek, individual foil
- Károly Kárpáti, freestyle wrestling, lightweight

=== After the Holocaust, 1948-1972 ===
After the Holocaust, less than 1% of the population of Hungary remained of Jewish heritage. In individual sports events, Hungary won 48 gold medals between 1948 and 1972. Sportsmen and mainly sportswomen of Jewish extraction won 10 gold medals (20.8%). Hungarian Jewish women won 7 gold medals out of the 15 individual gold medals won by Hungarian women. In the 19 gold medal-winning teams for Hungary, 9 had Jewish members.

There are no known Hungarian Jewish gold medalist since 1976. Overall, Hungarian Jews won 15.4% of the 117 individual gold medals of Hungary, and had part in at least 16 out of the 42 gold medals in team events.

==== 1948 ====
- Ilona Elek, individual foil

==== 1952 ====
- Robert Antal, water polo
- Sándor Gellér, soccer
- Ágnes Keleti, gymnastics, floor exercises
- Éva Székely, swimming, 200-meter breaststroke

==== 1956 ====
- Ágnes Keleti (4)
  - gymnastics, asymmetrical bars, floor exercises, balance beam,
  - team exercise with portable apparatus
- Aliz Kertész, gymnastics, team exercise with portable apparatus
- László Fábián, kayak pairs, 10,000-meters

==== 1960 ====
- Gyula Török, boxing, flyweight

==== 1964 ====
- Tamás Gábor, fencing, team épée
- Ildikó Rejtő (2), fencing, individual and team foil
- Árpád Orbán, soccer

==== 1968 ====
- Mihály Hesz, kayak, K1 1000m

==== 1972 ====
- Gyorgy Gedó, boxing, light flyweight

== Artists ==
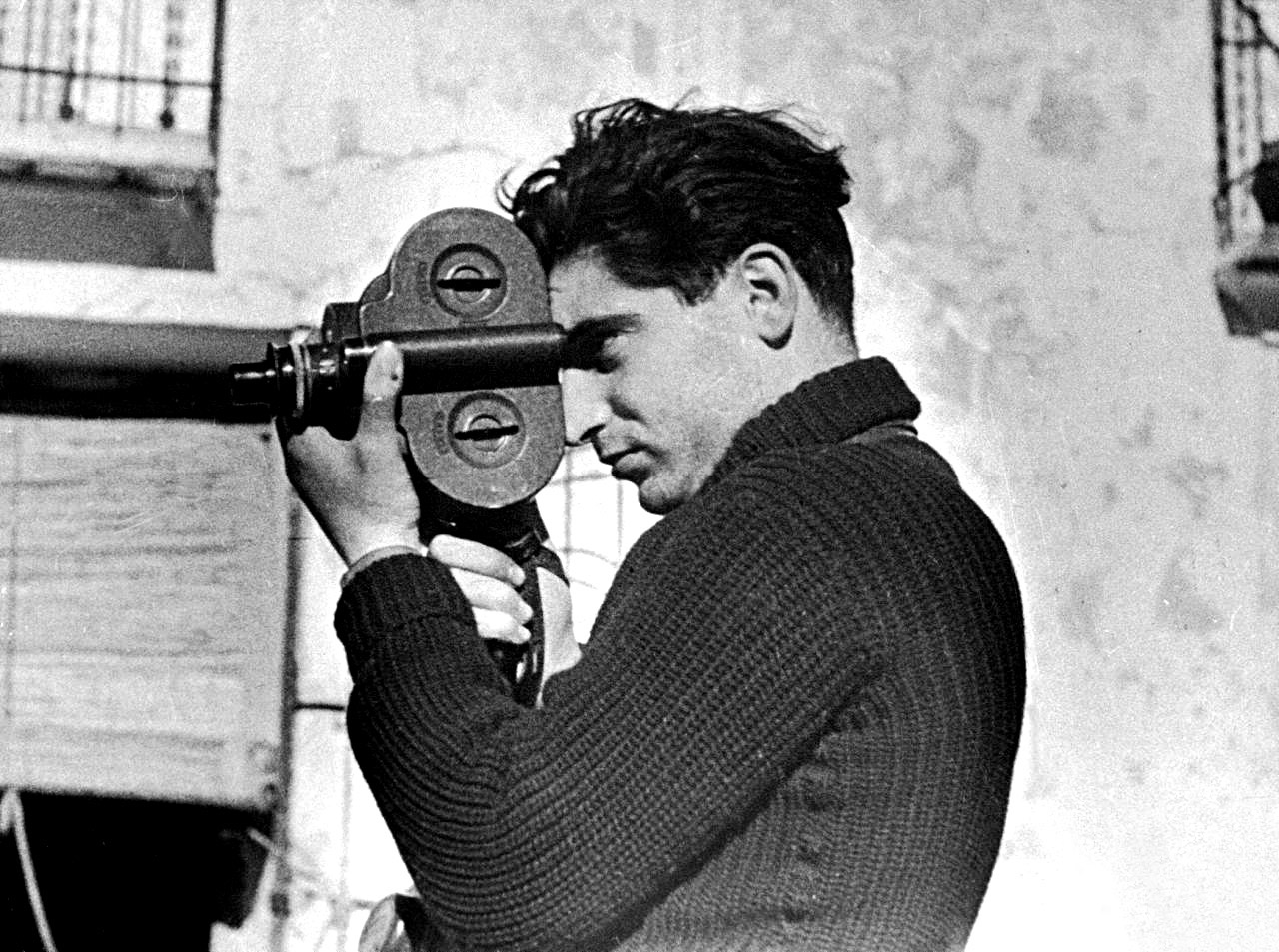
Robert Capa

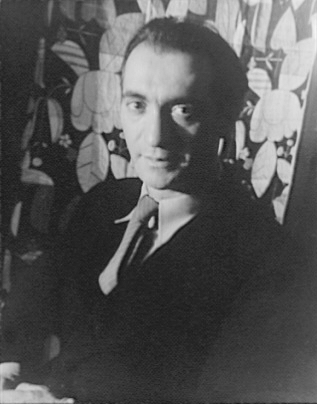
Nickolas Muray

- Imre Ámos, painter, born 1907 in Nagykálló, killed during the Holocaust
- Robert Capa, photographer
- Béla Czóbel
- Adolf Fényes
- André François, painter and graphic artist (Jewish father)
- György Goldmann, sculptor
- Lucien Hervé, born Laszlo Elkan, photographer, known best for his architectural photographs, particularly those associated with Le Corbusier.
- Béla Iványi-Grünwald
- André Kertész, born Andor Kertész, photographer, photo-essayist
- Ervin Marton
- George Mayer-Marton, born Gyorgy Mayer, artist
- László Moholy-Nagy
- Nickolas Muray, photographer, born Miklós Mandl, Szeged HU, 1892-1965 New York City, and Olympic fencer. Known for his advances in commercial photography, most notably the first use of color film.
- Izsák Perlmutter
- Kermit (Wayne) Weinberger, artist, designer, famous for his Las Vegas neon creations. Born to Jewish Hungarian parents.

== Business ==
=== Businessmen ===
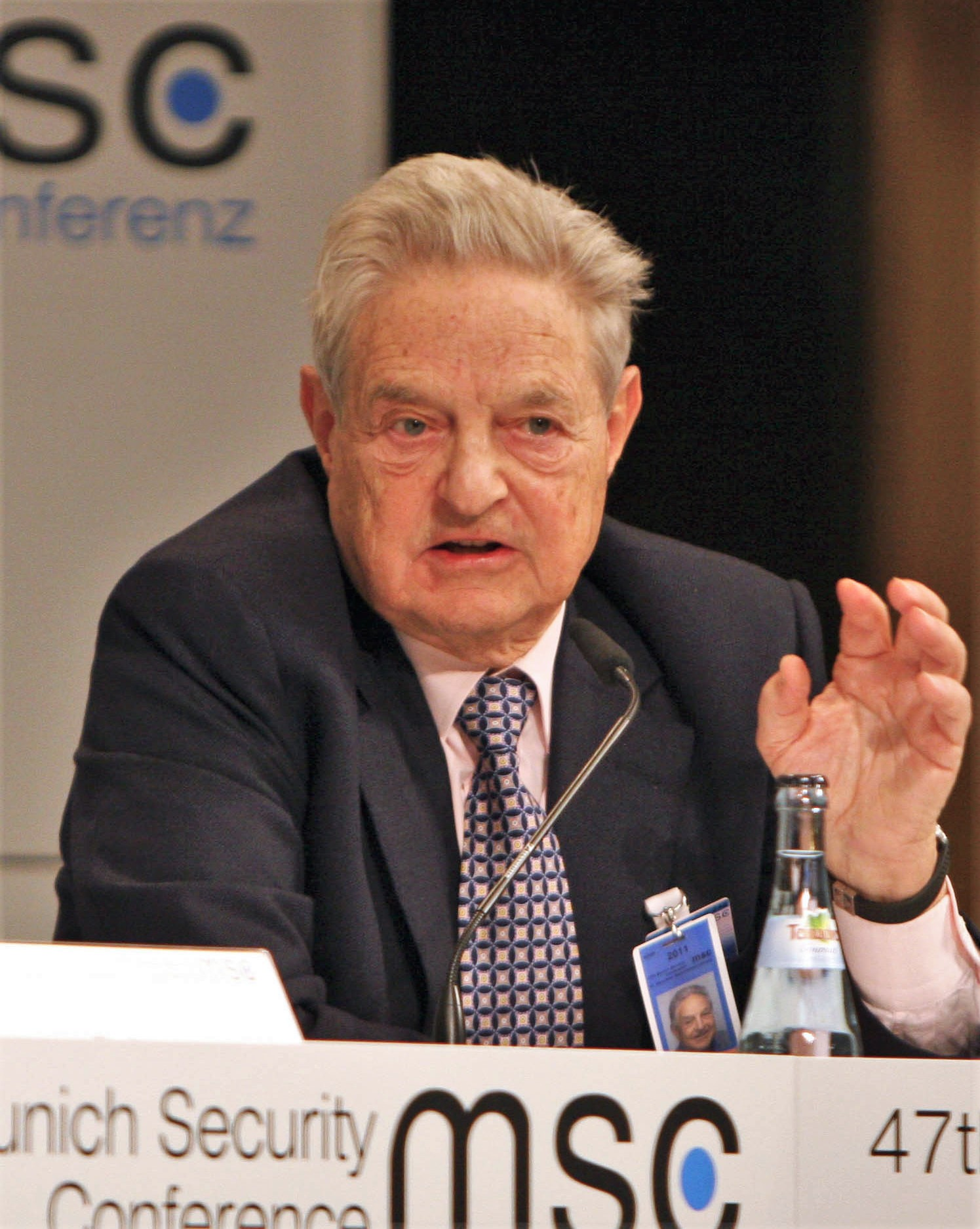
George Soros

- Jim Breyer, venture capitalist
- Leo Castelli, Trieste-born American art dealer of note.
- Andrew Grove, one of the founders and the CEO of Intel
- Sándor Hatvany-Deutsch
- Paul Reichmann's parents were born in Hungary
- Tibor Rosenbaum, rabbi and businessman
- George Soros, Hungarian-American investor and philanthropist
- Sholam Weiss, bankruptcy specialist

=== Industrialists and bankers ===
- Móric Fischer de Farkasházy, founder the Herend Porcelain Manufactory in 1839
- Leó Lánczy
- Jenő Vida
- Ferenc Chorin
- Ferenc Chorin Jr
- Fülöp Weisz
- Gedeon Richter

== Chess players ==
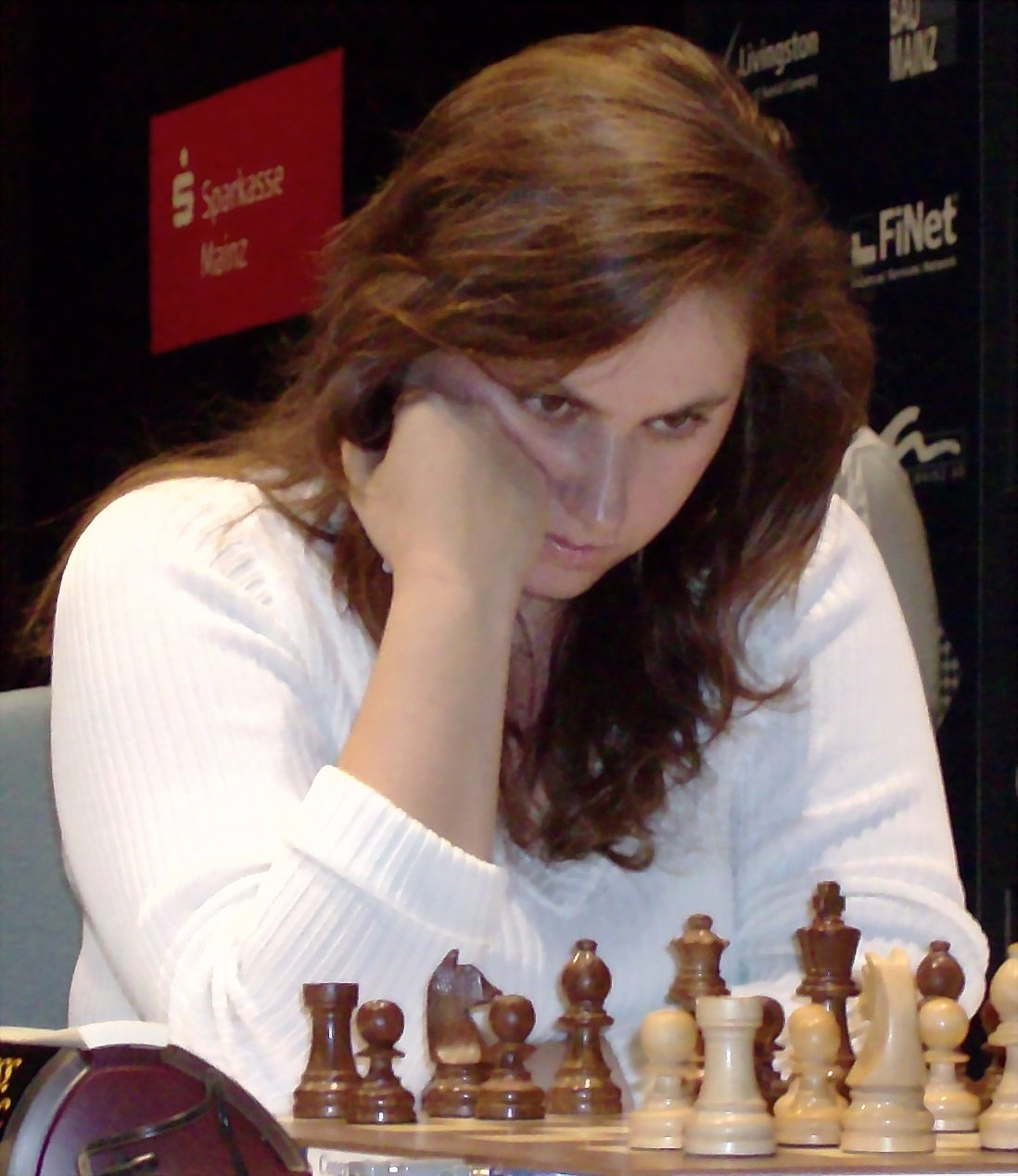
Judit Polgár

Susan Polgar

- Rudolph Charousek
- Isidor Gunsberg
- Ignatz von Kolisch
- Andor Lilienthal
- Johann Löwenthal
- Judit Polgár
- Susan Polgár
- Zsófia Polgár
- Richard Réti
- Adolf Schwarz
- Endre Steiner
- Lajos Steiner
- László Szabó
- Bobby Fischer (both parents Hungarian Jews)

== Film and stage ==
=== Actors ===
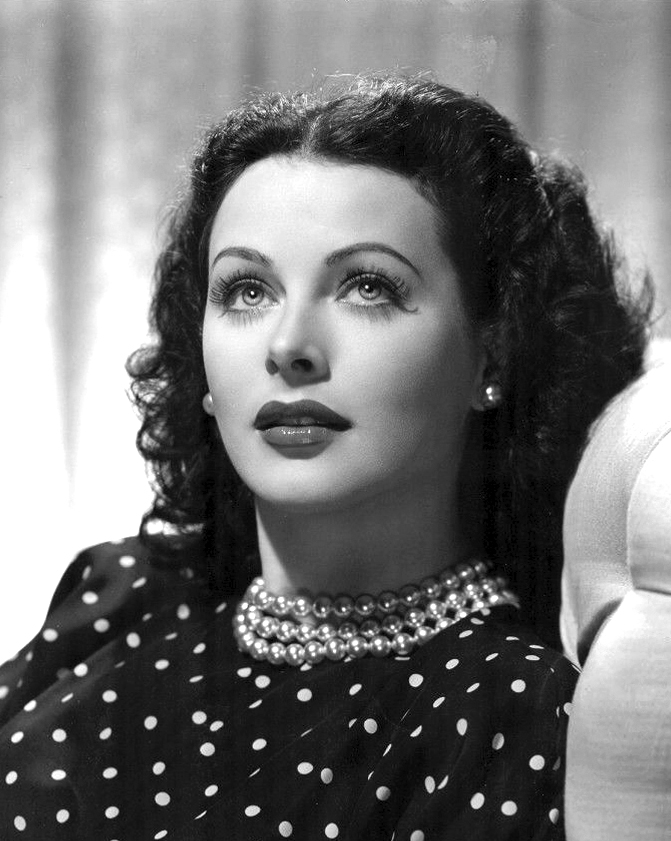
Hedy Lamarr

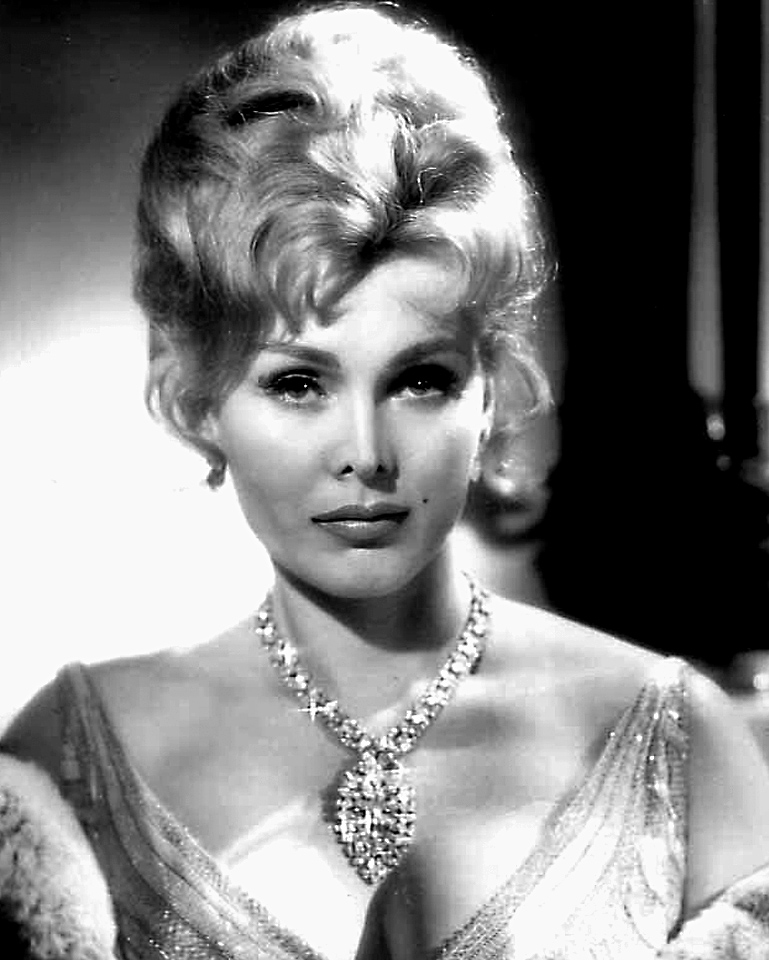
Zsa Zsa Gabor

- Gábor Baraker
- Jerry Seinfeld (paternal side)
- Eva Bartok (father Jewish, born Szöke)
- Tony Curtis; his parents were born in Mátészalka.
- Franciska Gaal; born Jewish as Szidónia Silberspitz
- Miklós Gábor
- Zsa Zsa Gabor, born in Budapest, Hungary
- Dezső Garas
- Gyula Gózon
- Leslie Howard's father was born in Hungary
- Gyula Kabos
- Harry Houdini born in Budapest, Hungary
- Hedy Lamarr
- Kálmán Latabár (mother Jewish)
- Peter Lorre
- László Márkus
- Imre Ráday
- Márton Rátkai
- Sándor Radó
- Sándor Rott
- Kálmán Rózsahegyi
- Eva Six (father Jewish)
- Géza Steinhardt
- Paul Newman (father Jewish)
- Zoltán Várkonyi

=== Directors, screenwriters, and industry ===
- George Cukor, film director
- Michael Curtiz, born Manó Kertész Kaminer, film director
- Judit Elek, film director and screenwriter
- William Fox, producer and founder of Fox Film Studios; his name has been perpetuated in later film/broadcasting companies, born Fried Vilmos
- Béla Gaál film director
- Viktor Gertler, film editor and director
- Henric Hirsch, director
- Harry Houdini
- Alexander Korda, born Sándor László Kellner, brother of Vincent and Zoltan Korda, film producer and director
- Vincent Korda, born Vincent Kellner, brother of Alexander and Zoltan Korda, art director
- Zoltán Korda, born Zoltán Kellner, brother of Alexander and Vincent Korda, film screenwriter, director, and producer
- László Nemes, film director (mother Jewish)
- Paul Newman's father was born in Hungary, as was his Catholic mother
- Joe Pasternak
- Emeric Pressburger
- S. Z. Sakall
- István Szabó, film director, screenwriter, and opera director
- István Székely film director
- János Szász, film director
- Alexandre Trauner
- Rachel Weisz's father was born in Hungary
- Adolph Zukor, founder of Paramount Pictures

== Historians ==
- Ignác Acsády, historian
- Ignác Kúnos, linguist
- John Lukacs, historian (Roman Catholic, with a Jewish mother)
- Géza Vermes, historian

== Inventors and scientists ==
- János Bodor, inventor and innovator in the field of food technology
- László Bíró, inventor of the ballpoint pen
- Marcel Breuer architect
- Dennis Gabor, inventor of the holography
- David Gestetner, inventor of the stencil duplicator
- Peter Carl Goldmark, inventor of long-playing (LP) records
- András Gróf (Andrew Grove), pioneer of the semiconductor industry, CEO of Intel
- Gedeon Richter, pharmaceuticals; inventor and industrialist
- Elizabeth Rona, nuclear chemist and contributor to the Manhattan Project
- David Schwarz, inventor of the Zeppelin
- Charles Weissmann, biochemist
- Eugene Wigner (Wigner Jenő), physicist and Nobel laureate (parents were Lutheran by religion)
- Gabor A. Somorjai (Hungarian-American) the "father" of modern surface-chemistry, leading world-expert on heterogeneous catalysis by metal surfaces

=== Nobel Prize winners ===
- Robert Bárány (1914) - Medicine
- György Hevesy (George de Hevesy) (1943) - Chemistry (born Roman Catholic)
- Jenő Wigner (Eugene Wigner) (1963) - Physics (Lutheran convert)
- Dénes Gábor (Dennis Gabor) (1971) - Physics (Lutheran convert)
- Milton Friedman (1976) - Economics
- János Polányi (John Charles Polanyi) (1986) - Chemistry (born Roman Catholic)
- Elie Wiesel (1986-2016) - Peace
- János Harsányi (John Harsanyi) (1994) - Economics (born Roman Catholic)
- Imre Kertész (2002) - Literature
- Ferenc Herskó (Avram Hershko) (2004) - Chemistry

=== Physicists ===
- Dennis Gabor
- Theodore von Kármán
- John von Neumann
- Paul Neményi
- Leó Szilárd
- Edward Teller
- László Tisza
- Eugene Wigner

=== Social scientists ===
- Peter Thomas Bauer, economist
- Milton Friedman, his parents emigrated from Beregszász, then in Hungary.
- Frank Furedi, sociologist
- John Harsanyi, economist, game theory; Nobel laureate (born Roman Catholic, from a Jewish background)
- Nicholas Kaldor, British economist
- János Kornai, economist
- Gottlieb Wilhelm Leitner (1840–1899), educationist and orientalist
- Karl Mannheim sociologist,
- Adolf Neubauer, Hebraist
- Karl Polanyi, economist and philosopher
- George Katona psychologist, developed economic psychology

== Mathematicians ==
- Raoul Bott (ethnically Jewish through mother)
- Arthur Erdélyi
- Paul Erdős
- Lipót Fejér
- Michael Fekete
- László Fuchs
- Tibor Gallai
- Géza Grünwald
- Alfréd Haar
- Paul Halmos
- László Kalmár
- John Kemeny
- Dénes Kőnig
- Gyula Kőnig
- Imre Lakatos
- Tamas Lengyel
- Kornél Lőwy (Cornelius Lanczos)
- Peter Lax
- John von Neumann (Roman Catholic convert)
- Rózsa Péter
- George Pólya
- Tibor Radó
- Alfréd Rényi
- Frigyes Riesz
- Marcel Riesz
- Lajos Schlesinger
- Otto Szász
- Gábor Szegő
- Peter Szüsz
- Pál Turán
- Abraham Wald
- Eugene Wigner

== Music ==
=== Composers ===
- Pál Ábrahám
- Károly Goldmark
- Gábor Darvas
- André Hajdu, composer, educator
- Imre Kálmán (Emmerich Kálmán)
- György Kurtág (half Jewish)
- Sándor Kuti, composer
- György Ligeti
- Miklós Rózsa, composer
- Rezső Seress
- Sándor Vándor, composer, educator
- László Weiner, composer
- Leó Weiner, composer
- Pál Hermann, composer, virtuoso cellist

=== Conductors ===
- Ádám Fischer
- Ivan Fischer
- Ferenc Fricsay (half Jewish through mother)
- György Justus, composer, musicologist, choir master
- István Kertész
- Jenő Ormándy (Eugene Ormandy)
- Fritz Reiner
- Sir Georg Solti
- György Széll (George Szell)

=== Musicians ===
- Pál Budai, pianist, composer
- Ádám Fischer, conductor
- Peter Frankl, pianist
- Endre Granat, violinist
- István Kertész, conductor
- Ervin Nyiregyházi, pianist (half Jewish through mother)
- György Pauk, violinist
- Tommy Ramone, drummer for The Ramones (born Erdélyi Tamás)
- János Sándor, conductor
- Ervin Schiffer, violist
- György Schiffer, cellist
- Georg Solti, conductor
- Mark Freuder Knopfler, guitar, Dire Straits,

=== Performers of music ===
- Gitta Alpár - voice, soprano & actress
- Geza Anda - piano (half Jewish)
- Ilona Fehér - violin
- Annie Fischer - piano
- Joseph Joachim - violin
- Endre Granat - violin
- György Pauk - violin
- László Polgár - voice, bass
- Ede Reményi - violin
- Márk Rózsavölgyi - violin
- István Nádas - piano
- András Schiff - piano
- János Starker - violoncello
- Mihály Székely - voice, bass
- Joseph Szigeti - violin

== Psychoanalysts ==
- Michael Balint, psychoanalyst
- René Spitz, psychoanalyst.
- Sándor Ferenczi, psychoanalyst.
- Géza Róheim
- Lipót Szondi, psychiatrist
- Thomas Szasz, psychiatrist

== Religious figures ==
See Hungarian-Jewish Religious Figures

== Writers ==
- Béla Balázs, poet & film critic
- Tibor Déry
- Renée Erdős
- György Faludy
- Milán Füst
- Ágnes Heller.
- Ferenc Karinthy
- Imre Kertész, winner, Nobel Prize in Literature (2002)
- Arthur Koestler, novelist & critic
- György Konrád
- Rudolf Lothar, dramatist
- György Lukács, Marxist literary critic and philosopher.
- Kati Marton
- George Mikes
- György Moldova
- Ferenc Molnár
- Péter Nádas
- Endre Nagy, creator of Hungarian cabaret
- István Örkény
- Károly Pap
- Erno Polgar
- Giorgio Pressburger
- Miklós Radnóti, poet
- Jenő Rejtő
- György Spiró
- Gábor T. Szántó
- Antal Szerb
- Ephraim Kishon, born as Ferenc Hoffmann, Hungarian-Israeli writer, satirist, and film director.
- Dezső Szomory
- Aleksandar Tisma
- Paul Tenczer
- József Vészi
- Elie Wiesel, writer, Nobel Peace Prize (1986)
- Béla Zsolt writer of Kilenc Koffer

== Families ennobled between 1874 and 1918 (mainly industrialists) ==
- Biedermann – 1902
- Dirsztay – 1905
- Engel – 1879
- Groedl – 1900
- Gutmann – 1905
- Harkányi – 1904
- Hatvany – 1917
- Hatvany-Deutsch – 1895
- Hazai – 1912
- Herczel – 1912
- Herzog – 1904
- Kohner – 1904
- Korányi – 1912
- Kornfeld – 1908
- Königswarter – 1897
- Kuffner – 1904
- Lévay – 1897
- Madarassy-Beck – 1906
- Nauman – 1906
- Ohrenstein – 1913
- Orosdy – 1905
- Posner Karl
- Schosberger – 1890
- Tornyai-Schosberger – 1905
- Ulmann – 1918
- Weiss – 1918
- Wodianer – 1874
- Wolfner – 1918

== See also ==
- List of Hungarians
- History of the Jews in Hungary
