= List of Hungarian Americans =

This is a list of notable Hungarian Americans, including both original immigrants who obtained American citizenship and their American descendants.

Many Hungarians emigrated to the United States during the Second World War and after the Soviet invasion in 1956 during Operation Safe Haven.

== List ==
=== Actors, performers, and comedians ===
- Christina Pazsitzky - (1976-) comedian, born to Hungarian parents who escaped the country in 1969, during the rule of the Hungarian People's Republic.
- Don Adams - (1923–2005) born Donald James Yarmy in New York. His father was of Hungarian descent. Best known for the television show Get Smart.
- Morey Amsterdam - (1908–1996) born Moritz Amsterdam to Austro-Hungarian parents in Chicago, was an American comedy writer, actor and comedian. Best noted for his role as Buddy Sorrell on The Dick Van Dyke Show from 1961 to 1966.
- Eszter Bálint - (1966-) born in Budapest is an accomplished musician and actress. She appeared in several films including Stranger Than Paradise (1984) directed by Jim Jarmusch and Shadows and Fog (1991) directed by Woody Allen. She is the daughter of avant garde playwright Stephan Bálint.
- Rachel Weisz - Her father, George Weisz, was a Hungarian Jewish mechanical engineer.
- Vilma Bánky - (1901–1991) born Koncsics Vilma in Budapest. The silent film actor appeared opposite Rudolph Valentino in The Eagle (1925) and The Son of the Sheik (1926). She also appeared in several films co starring Ronald Colman.
- Drew Barrymore - mother is a Hungarian immigrant
- Judith Barsi (1978–1988) - daughter of Hungarian immigrant parents and child actor, murdered with mother by her father in her sleep
- Oscar Beregi Jr. - (1918–1976) Hungarian-born film and television actor. Son of actor Oscar Beregi Sr.
- Mayim Bialik
- Alex Borstein
- Ferike Boros - (1873–1951) born in Nagyvárad, Austria-Hungary, was a stage and movie actress with a long career on Broadway from 1909 through 1927. She went to Hollywood in 1930, acting in character roles for several studios.
- Fanny Brice - (1891–1951) born Fania Borach in Manhattan to a Hungarian mother. A celebrated comedienne, singer, actor and radio personality, she was best known as the creator and star of the top-rated radio comedy series The Baby Snooks Show. The stage and film musical Funny Girl (1964) and 1968) both starring Barbra Streisand was based on her life.
- Adrien Brody - (1973-) Academy Award Best Actor winner for The Pianist (2002) and for The Brutalist (2024). His mother is the noted Hungarian born photographer Sylvia Plachy.
- Agnes Bruckner
- Louis C.K. - comedian
- Jamie Lee Curtis - (1959-) actor and daughter of actors Tony Curtis and Janet Leigh. Her paternal grandparents were Hungarian Immigrants.
- Tony Curtis - (1925–2010) born Bernard Schwartz in New York. Father of actor Jamie Lee Curtis. Best known for Sweet Smell of Success (1957), The Defiant Ones (1958), and the comedy Some Like It Hot (1959). He was nominated for an Academy Award for Best Actor for the last two films.
- Matthew Daddario - actor, his mother has Hungarian/Slovak, German, and English ancestry.
- Alexandra Daddario - actress, her mother has Hungarian/Slovak, German, and English ancestry.
- Bill Dana - (1924–2017) born William Szathmáry to Hungarian immigrant parents. An early television performing comedian and comedy writer appearing regularly on The Steve Allen Show. He had his own NBC sitcom, The Bill Dana Show (1963–1965).
- Rodney Dangerfield
- Lili Darvas - (1902–1974) born in Budapest was an actress noted for her stage work in Europe and the United States and, later in her career, in films and on television. She was married to playwright Ferenc Molnár.
- Dolly Sisters - Rosie Dolly (1892–1970) born Rózsika Deutsch and Jenny Dolly born Janka Deutsch (1892–1941). Vaudeville dancer identical twin sisters. Famous stage performers in the 1920s.
- Marta Eggerth - (1912–2013) born in Budapest. She was a Hungarian actress and singer from "The Silver Age of Operetta". Many of the 20th century's most famous operetta composers, including Franz Lehár, Fritz Kreisler, Robert Stolz, Oscar Straus, and Paul Abraham, composed works especially for her.
- Peter Falk - (1927–2011) born in New York of Hungarian ancestry on his mother's side. This multi Emmy and Golden Globe Award winner is best known for his role as Lt. Columbo which ran for several decades. There is a statue of Falk in his role as Columbo in Budapest.
- Sherilyn Fenn
- Dolores Fuller
- Eva Gabor - (1919–1995) born Gábor Éva in Budapest she was an actress, businesswoman, singer, and socialite. Best known for her role as Lisa Douglas, the wife of Eddie Albert's character, Oliver Wendell Douglas, on the television sitcom Green Acres, 1965–1971.
- Zsa Zsa Gabor - (1917–2016) born Gábor Sári in Budapest she was an actress and socialite. She is noted for her beauty, wit and nine marriages. Zsa Zsa was crowned Miss Hungary in 1936. One of her few leading film roles was in the John Huston-directed film, Moulin Rouge (1952). Her sisters were actresses Eva Gabor and Magda Gabor.
- Steven Geray - (1904–1973) born István Gyergyay. The prolific Film Noir character actor appeared in over 100 noted films including Spellbound (1945), Gilda (1946), All About Eve (1950), Affair in Trinidad (1952), etc.
- Olga Grey - (1896–1973) born Anna Zacsek in New York to Hungarian parents was a silent film actor appearing in Birth of a Nation (1915), her first film Intolerance (1916), Macbeth (1916) among other films.
- Mariska Hargitay - (1964-) born Mariska Magdolna Hargitay in Santa Monica. Her parents were actor Jayne Mansfield and body bodybuilder Mickey Hargitay. She is best known for her role as New York Police Captain Olivia Benson on the long running NBC drama series Law & Order: Special Victims Unit.
- Shawn Hatosy
- Goldie Hawn - maternal grandparents were Hungarian Jews
- Paul Henreid - (1908–1992) born in Trieste, Austro-Hungary. The actor is best remembered for two films: Casablanca and Now, Voyager, both released between 1942 and 1943.
- Kate Hudson - two maternal great-grandparents were Hungarian Jews
- Robert Hegyes
- Ina Balin - Hungarian mother
- Elizabeth Kaitan
- Katalin Karády - (1910–1990) born in Budapest as Katalin Mária Kanczler was a Hungarian actress and noted singer. She received the posthumous Righteous medal from the Yad Vashem Institute for rescuing a number of Hungarian Jews. She left Hungary in 1952 and in 1968 she finally received a visa to the US after Ted and Robert Kennedy intervened on her behalf.
- Robert Karvelas - cousin of Don Adams and Dick Yarney
- Chris Kattan
- Natalie Kingston - (1905–1992) born Natalia Ringstromin, was an American actor during the silent and early talkie film era and worked with Mack Sennett, Harry Langdon and others. She was granddaughter of Agoston Haraszthy, founder of California's wine industry.
- Robert Klein - (1942-) noted comedian and actor. Both sets of grandparents were Hungarian. Part of The Second City comedy improv theater, he hosted Saturday Night Live several times in the 1970s and had his own show, Robert Klein Time on USA network 1986–1988. He appeared in several films and released numerous comedy albums.
- Charles Korvin - (1907–1998) born Géza Korvin Kárpáthy. Noted Hungarian-American film noir actor, stage and television actor, cinematographer and still film photographer.
- Ernie Kovacs - (1919–1962) American comedian, actor, writer and early television innovator. His father was a Hungarian immigrant. Known for his wacky characters on the Ernie Kovacs Show for the DuMont Television Network. His best known film roles were in Bell, Book and Candle (1958), Our Man in Havana (1959), and Strangers When We Meet (1960).
- David Krumholtz - (1978-) born in Queens, New York. He is an actor whose mother is a Hungarian 1956 refugee.
- Lisa Kudrow - ancestors emigrated from Hungary
- Hedy Lamarr - (1914–2000) born Hedwig Eva Maria Kiesler in Vienna, Austria. Her mother was Hungarian. She was an actor, inventor, and film producer who gained world recognition in Ecstasy (1933). With her friend, George Antheil she created a frequency-hopping signal that couldn't be tracked or jammed. During the 1962 Cuban Missile Crisis, an updated version of their design was installed on Navy ships.
- Peter Lorre - (1904–1964) born László Löwenstein. Famous character actor best remembered for Fritz Lang's M (1931), Alfred Hitchcock's The Man Who Knew Too Much (1934), John Huston's The Maltese Falcon (1941) and Michael Curtiz's Casablanca (1942).
- Jon Lovitz
- Bela Lugosi - (1882–1956) born Béla Ferenc Dezső Blaskó. Hollywood actor known most notably for portraying Count Dracula.
- Paul Lukas - (1894–1971) born Pál Lukács in Budapest. A suave actor with a successful stage and film career in Hungary, Germany, and Austria, where he worked with Max Reinhardt. He won an Academy Award for Best Actor in the film Watch on the Rhine, 1943.
- Ali MacGraw - maternal grandparents were of Hungarian descent
- Bill Maher - mother's family was of Hungarian Jewish origin
- Ilona Massey - (1920–1974) born Hajmássy Ilona in Budapest. A stage, screen and radio actor, she acted in three films with Nelson Eddy including Rosalie 1937, and Frankenstein Meets the Wolf Man, 1943, as Baroness Frankenstein.
- Paul Newman - father was of Hungarian and Polish Jewish descent, maternal grandparents were Slovaks from Hungary
- Marisol Nichols
- Dean Norris - grandfather was Hungarian, from Tiszadob.
- Elsa Pataky - mother is a publicist of Hungarian descent from Transylvania.
- Michael Pataki
- Trisha Paytas - American YouTuber and media personality. Father is of full Hungarian descent.
- Joe Penner - (1904–1941) born Pintér József in Nagybecskerek, Austria- Hungary, (now Zrenjanin, Serbia). He was a noted 1930s-era vaudeville, radio and film comedian.
- Joaquin Phoenix - maternal grandmother was of Hungarian descent
- River Phoenix - maternal grandmother was of Hungarian descent
- Rain Phoenix - maternal grandmother was of Hungarian descent
- Summer Phoenix - maternal grandmother was of Hungarian descent
- Liberty Phoenix - maternal grandmother was of Hungarian descent.
- Ted Raimi - Jewish American actor, Xena, Warrior Princess; ancestors came from Russia and Hungary
- Carl Reiner - (1922–2020) award-winning stand-up comedian, director, screenwriter, and author whose career spanned seven decades was born in the Bronx to Austrian-Hungarian parents.
- Soupy Sales - (1926–2009) born Milton Supman in Franklinton, North Carolina. His father was a Hungarian immigrant. Sales was a comedian in radio, television and film. Noted for his pranks and antics.
- Jerry Seinfeld - (1954-) born Jerome Allen Seinfeld in Brooklyn, New York. Comedian noted for his eponymous television sitcom Seinfeld (1989–1998). His father was of Hungarian descent.
- Shaun Sipos
- Bobbi Starr - pornographic actress
- Szőke Szakáll (S. Z. Sakall) - (1888–1955) born Jakab Grünwald in Budapest. Nicknamed “Cuddles”, he was already a noted cabaret performer and film actor in Europe, and later became a staple of Hollywood's Golden Age productions after emigrating to the US.
- Cynthia Szigeti - comic actress and comic teacher
- Jessica Szohr - paternal grandfather was of Hungarian descent
- Jeffrey M. Tambor - (1944-) American actor and comedian of Hungarian ancestry. A winner of two Emmy awards. Appeared in dozens of films and television series. Most noted for his role in Transparent as transgender divorced parent Maura Pfefferman.
- Edra Toth - ballet dancer
- Victor Varconi - (1891–1976) born Várkonyi Mihály in Kisvárda, Austria-Hungary. Hungarian silent film actor later relocated to Hollywood. He was in The King of Kings (1927), and later in numerous roles as a character actor.
- Johnny Weissmuller - (1904–1984) born János Weissmüller in Szabadfalva, Austria Hungary, now a district of Timisoara, Romania. He was a competition swimmer, water polo player and actor, known for playing Tarzan in a dozen films of the 1930s and 1940s and for having one of the best competitive swimming records of the 20th century.
- Cornel Wilde - (1912–1989) born Kornél Lajos Weisz, he was a Hungarian-American actor and film director. Noted for his Film Noir leading roles.

=== Filmmakers, Cinematographers, Playwrights ===
- Nimród Antal - (born 1973) film director
- Stephan Balint - (1943–2007) born Bálint István in Budapest, Hungary, he was a writer, actor, theatre director and playwright and co-founder of New York City's avant garde Squat Theatre. Balint was the father of actress and musician Eszter Balint.
- László Benedek - (1905–1992) born in Budapest; cinematographer and film director best known for directing The Wild One (1953) and Death of a Salesman (1951) for which he won the Golden Globe Award for best director.
- Gabor Csupo - animator of Rugrats and early Simpsons
- George Cukor - (1899–1983) New York born renowned film director of Hungarian immigrant parents, he best known for The Women (1939), The Philadelphia Story (1940), Gaslight (1944), Adam's Rib (1949), Born Yesterday (1950), A Star Is Born (1954), and won the Academy Award for Best Director for My Fair Lady (1964).
- Michael Curtiz - (1886–1962) born Manó Kaminer in Budapest. Hollywood Golden Age Academy Award-winning director of Casablanca (1942), Mildred Pierce (1945), White Christmas (1954).
- Frank Darabont - producer and director
- William S. Darling - (1882–1963) born Vilmos Béla Sándorházi, was born in Sándorház, Austria- Hungary. An art director, he was prominent in Hollywood during the 1920s and 30s. Darling received six Academy Award nominations, winning the Oscar three times.
- André de Toth - (1913–2002) born Endre Antal Miksa DeToth in Makó, Hungary, was a film director noted for the early 3 D film House of Wax (1953) and numerous westerns and film noir.
- Jules Engel - animator, filmmaker and teacher
- Joe Eszterhas - (1944-) born in Csákánydoroszló, Hungary. Screenwriter for films Flashdance (1983), Jagged Edge (1985), Basic Instinct (1982), and Showgirls (1995). Best known for his 2004 memoir, Hollywood Animal.
- William Fox - (1879–1952) born Wilhelm Fuchs in Tolcsva, Hungary. He was a motion picture executive who founded the Fox Film Corporation (20th Century Fox) in 1915 and the Fox West Coast Theatres chain in the 1920s.
- László Kovács - (1933–2007) born Kovács László in Cece, Hungary. With Vilmos Zsigmond, fellow cinematography student and lifelong friend, secretly filmed the day-to-day development of the Hungarian Revolution of 1956. His most famous cinematography includes Easy Rider (1969), Five Easy Pieces (1970), Shampoo (1975), New York, New York (1977), Ghostbusters (1984), The Last Waltz (1978), What's Up, Doc? (1972), Paper Moon (1973) among others.
- Andrew Laszlo - (1926–2011) born László András in Pápa, Hungary. A cinematographer who arrived in the U.S. in 1947, he started his career as cameraman on The Ed Sullivan Show, The Phil Silvers Show and Naked City. Noted for films One Potato, Two Potato (1962), The Out-of-Towners (1970), The Owl and the Pussycat (1970), The Warriors (1979) among others.
- Ferenc Molnár - (1887–1952) born Ferenc Neumann in Budapest, Austria-Hungary. Author, stage-director, dramatist, poet and Hungary's most celebrated playwright. His plays continue to be relevant and are performed all over the world. His play, Liliom (1909) was later made into a Broadway musical Carousel (1945), and Hollywood film (1946).
- George Pal - (1908–1980) born György Pál Marczincsak in Cegléd, Hungary. Film director, producer, cinematographer, special effects innovator. Directed Tom Thumb (1958), The Time Machine (1960), and The Wonderful World of the Brothers Grimm (1962).
- Gabriel Pascal - (1894–1954) born Lehel Gábor in Budapest, Hungary, was a noted film director and producer
- Joe Pasternak - (1901–1991) born József Paszternák in Szilágysomlyó, Austria-Hungary. He worked in Hungary and in Germany before working at Universal in Hollywood, and later at MGM. Partial list of his productions include; Destry Rides Again (1939), Anchors Aweigh (1945), In the Good Old Summertime (1949) and Please Don't Eat the Daisies (1960.
- Sam Raimi - film director, producer; brother of Ted Raimi
- Oliver A. Unger - (1914–1981) film and television producer
- Andrew G. Vajna - movie producer, co-founder of Carolco Pictures (Rambo, Terminator, Basic Instinct, Total Recall, Evita)
- Charles Vidor - (1900–1959) born Károly Vidor in Budapest. He was a film director of notable films such as Cover Girl (1944), Together Again (1944), A Song to Remember (1945), Gilda (1946), The Joker Is Wild (1957), and A Farewell to Arms (1957).
- King Wallis Vidor - (1894–1982) noted film producer, screenwriter and film director. His grandfather Károly Charles Vidor was a refugee of the Hungarian Revolution of 1848.
- Jules White - producer
- Vilmos Zsigmond - (1930–2016) born Zsigmond Vilmos in Szeged, Hungary. With fellow film cinematography student László Kovács, filmed events of the 1956 Hungarian Revolution in Budapest by hiding the camera in a shopping bag. Academy Award-winning cinematographer for Close Encounters of the Third Kind (1977). Among his noted films are The Deer Hunter (1978), McCabe & Mrs. Miller (1971), The Long Goodbye (1973), Heaven's Gate (1980), The Bonfire of the Vanities (1990), and Melinda and Melinda (2001).
- Adolph Zukor - (1873–1976) born in Ricse, Hungary he was a film producer best known as one of the three founders of Paramount Pictures. He produced America's first feature-length film, The Prisoner of Zenda in 1913. In 1912, He established the Famous Players Film Company.

=== Fine Artists and Photographers ===
- John Albok - (1894–1982) Hungarian born photographer who immigrated to the US and documented street scenes in New York City during the Great Depression and later.
- Istvan Banyai - (1948–1922) born in Budapest, Hungary. Banyai was an illustration noted especially for his New Yorker covers and children's book illustrations.
- Robert Capa - (1913–1954) born Endre Ernő Friedmann in Budapest, photographer and a founder of Magnum Photos, brother of Cornell Capa.
- Cornell Capa - (1918–2008) born Kornél Friedmann in Budapest, founder of the International Center of Photography in New York, brother of Robert Capa.
- Elmyr de Hory - (1906–1976) born Elemér Albert Hoffmann. Noted artist and art forger. The 1977 Orson Welles documentary F For Fake is about de Hory.
- Andre de Dienes - (1913–1985) born Andor György Ikafalvi-Dienes in Torja, Hungary, today Turia, Romania. Noted photographer of Marilyn Monroe, nudes, fashion and Native American culture.
- Sari Dienes - (1898–1992) born as Sarolta Maria Anna Chylinska in Debreczen, Austria-Hungary, today Debrecen, Hungary was a prolific fine artist who studied in Paris with Fernand Léger. She was a significant influence on Robert Rauschenberg and Jasper Johns and a pioneer in the Art of Assemblage.
- Arnold Eagle - (1909–1992) born in Budapest. Noted New York City documentary photographer, Photo League early member and FSA photographer.
- Pál (Paul) Fried - (1993–1976) born in Budapest. He was a Hungarian-American artist best known for his eroticized paintings of female dancers and nudes.
- Hugo Gellért - (1892–1985) born Hugó Grünbaum in Budapest was an illustrator and muralist. He was a member of the Communist Party of America and created work for political activism in the 1920s and 1930s. In the US his works were featured prominently in The Masses, The Liberator The New Masses, later he was at The New Yorker and was on staff at the New York Times.
- Milton Glaser - (1929–2020) born in New York to Hungarian parents. He was a graphic designer and a co-founder of Push Pin Studios. His designs include the I Love New York logo, and the Bob Dylan poster?
- Lajos (Louis) Jambor - post-impressionism painter, illustrator, muralist
- Tibor Kálmán - (1949–1999) born in Budapest. Noted graphic designer and author. His wife, the illustrator and author Maira Kalman survives him.
- Steven Kemenyffy - ceramic artist, known for his raku work.
- André Kertész - (1894–1985) born Andor Kohn in Budapest. Noted for his pre World War II photography of Hungary, then his work in Paris with Brassaï, later for his photos of New York City.
- Balthazar Korab - (1926–2013) born Boldizsár Koráb in Budapest, was a noted Architectural Photographer based in Detroit, Michigan.
- Joseph Kosuth - (1945-) born in Toledo Ohio, relative of Lajos Kossuth, who achieved notability for his role in the Hungarian Revolution of 1848. Kosuth is a noted conceptual artist, he was on the faculty of The School of Visual Arts in New York for many years.
- László Moholy-Nagy - (1895–1946) born László Weisz in Bácsborsód, Hungary. Distinguished painter, designer, photographer and teacher at the Bauhaus School in Weimar, Germany. He was the founder of the New Bauhaus in Chicago in 1937.
- Martin Munkácsi - (1896–1963) born Márton Mermelstein in Kolozsvár, Hungary, now Cluj, Romania. Originally a photojournalist, he became a fashion photographer and was known for shooting models in action. He photographed for all the famous magazines in pre Nazi Germany and left for New York in 1933 where he was signed by Harpers Bazaar.
- Nickolas Muray - (1892–1965) born Miklós Mandl in Szeged, Hungary. He became a noted celebrity and fashion photographer in the US and was an Olympic fencer.
- Albert Nemethy - painter, noted for being one of the Hudson Valley's most legendary art figures.
- Sylvia Plachy - (1943-) born in Budapest is a photographer. Noted for her weekly Untitled Tour series in The Village Voice. She has published many books and has exhibitions worldwide. She is the mother of Academy Award-winning actor Adrien Brody.
- William Andrew Pogany - (1882–1955) born Vilmos András Pogány in Szeged was a prolific artist and book illustrator in the Art Novueau style.
- Tamás Révész - photographer
- Marcel Sternberger - (1899–1956) noted Hungarian born photographer who emigrated to the U.S. in 1938. As a skilled portrait photographer, he photographed the famous of the postwar era. The Roosevelt dime was based on his photograph of Franklin D. Roosevelt. He died suddenly in an automobile accident in 1956.
- Suzanne Szász - (1915–1997) born in Budapest. Photographer of children, cats and family life, she published about a dozen books and is best known for The Silent Miaow: A Manual For Kittens, Strays, And Homeless Cats (1964) with author Paul Gallico. She was a founding member along with her husband Ray Schorr of the American Society of Magazine Photographers.
- George Tscherny - (1924–2023) Budapest born graphic designer, photographer and educator. He establish the graphic design department at the School of Visual Arts in New York, and designed a series of posters to appear in the subways, and the school's current logo among other projects.
- Frank Varga - sculptor
- Ferenc Varga - sculptor

=== Athletes ===
- Sam Adonis – professional wrestler
- Julius Boros – professional golfer; two-time U.S. Open winner and oldest person ever to win a major tournament (PGA Championship, 1968)
- Ralph Branca – professional baseball player; mother was of Hungarian Jewish descent
- Greg Camarillo (born 1982) – football player
- Larry Csonka – football player
- Ed Doheny – baseball player
- Bertalan de Nemethy – show jumping coach for the United States Equestrian Team (1955–1980)
- Nick Fazekas – basketball player
- Kirk Ferentz – American football coach (currently with University of Iowa)
- Susan Francia – Olympic and world champion rower
- Jim Furyk – PGA golfer; father is of partial Hungarian descent
- Billy Gabor – basketball player
- Charlie Gogolak – football player
- Pete Gogolak – football player; invented "soccer style" kicking
- Lou Groza – football player
- Katherine Hadford – figure skater; Hungarian mother
- Mickey Hargitay – bodybuilder, father of Mariska Hargitay
- Charles Horváth – Hungarian-American soccer player
- Les Horvath – 1944 Heisman Trophy winner
- Tim Howard – soccer player
- Al Hrabosky – baseball player
- Béla Károlyi – born in Kolozsvár, Hungary (now Cluj-Napoca, Romania); coached Romanian gymnast Nadia Comăneci; trained gymnasts alongside his wife Marta in the US at the National Team Training Center in Huntsville, Texas until the center's closing in 2018
- Karch Kiraly – volleyball player and coach
- Howard Komives – professional basketball player
- Bernie Kosar – football player
- Doug Kotar – pro football player
- Sandy Koufax – baseball player, Member of National Baseball Hall of Fame
- Frank Kovacs – tennis player
- Joe Kovacs – world champion shot putter; paternal grandfather is Hungarian
- Sean Kuraly – ice hockey player
- Jack Lengyel – football coach
- Ted Ligety – Olympic and world champion alpine ski racer
- Joe Medwick – baseball player, inducted into Baseball Hall of Fame in 1968
- Zoltan Mesko – football punter
- Charles Nagy – baseball player
- Matt Nagy – pro football quarterback and coach
- Joe Namath – football player
- Nick Nemeth – professional wrestler better known by his WWE ring name of Dolph Ziggler
- Tom Orosz – pro football player
- Matthew Polinsky – professional wrestler and commentator better known by his WWE ring name of Corey Graves
- Allie Quigley – basketball player
- Jack Rudnay – pro football player
- Monica Seles – tennis player
- Dave Shula – football WR/PR, football coach
- Don Shula – football coach
- Mike Shula – football quarterback, football coach
- Rebecca Soni – Olympic and world champion backstroke swimmer
- Joe Theismann – former NFL and CFL football player turned broadcaster
- Jim Tomsula – former NFL head coach of the San Francisco 49ers
- Courtney Vandersloot – basketball player
- Scott Zolak – former pro football quarterback, announcer
- Teddy Atlas – boxing trainer and fight commentator
- Kevin Toth – former shot putter
- Juli Veee – former San Diego soccer star

=== Scientists, Economists, Engineers ===
- Réka Albert
- Béla H. Bánáthy – linguist, systems scientist, and professor
- Albert-László Barabási
- Zoltán Bay
- Dorothy Blum – computer scientist
- Arpad Elo
- Paul Erdős – mathematician
- Andrew Fraknoi – astronomer, educator, author
- Milton Friedman – (1912–2006) born in Brooklyn, New York to parents born in Beregszász, Kingdom of Hungary. Friedman was an economist who received the 1976 Nobel Memorial Prize in Economic Sciences. He received the Presidential Medal of Freedom in 1988 among other awards. Friedman was the author of several books and numerous essays.
- Daniel Carleton Gajdusek – co-recipient of 1976 Nobel Prize in Physiology or Medicine for early work on kuru
- József Galamb – mechanical engineer, designer of the Ford Model T
- Peter Carl Goldmark – engineer (LP record, color television)
- Sidney Gottlieb
- Andrew Grove – (1936–2016) businessman, engineer, and CEO of Intel Corporation
- Paul Halmos – mathematician
- Stevan Harnad – scientist
- John Harsanyi – economist, game theory in economics, Nobel Prize (1994)
- Csaba Horváth
- Imre Izsak
- Rudolf E. Kálmán – (1930–2016) electrical engineer co-inventor of the Kalman filter, and contributor to development of the State-space representation technique used in modern control theory
- Katalin Karikó – (1955-) biochemist who specializes in RNA-mediated mechanisms. Her technology has been licensed by BioNTech and Moderna to develop their COVID-19 vaccines.
- John George Kemeny – scientist (BASIC programming language)
- Nicholas Kurti – physicist
- Erno Laszlo – (1897–1973) born Ernő László in Nyitrazsámbokrét, Hungary, now Žabokreky nad Nitrou, Slovakia. He studied skin pathology and skin disease, founded The Erno Laszlo Institute in Budapest in 1927 and after emigrating to the U.S. in 1939 he continued with his Institute on Fifth Avenue and became one of the first celebrity dermatologists.
- Peter Lax – mathematician
- George Andrew Olah – chemist, Nobel Prize (1994)
- Ivan Raimi – Doctor of Osteopathic Medicine
- Laszlo Mechtler – Chief Medical Officer of the DENT Neurologic Institute & Professor of Neurooncology at Roswell Park Comprehensive Cancer Center
- Julius Rebek – chemist
- Peter Arnold Rona – (1934–2014) Both parents were Hungarian immigrants. He was a noted American oceanographer. The 2003 film, Volcanoes of the Deep Sea, documents Rona's and his colleague Richard A. Lutz's excursions of the oceanic hot springs.
- Hans Selye – physician, theory of psychological stress
- Charles Simonyi – (1948-) born Simonyi Károly in Budapest. A noted software architect who started and led Microsoft's applications group, where he built the first versions of Microsoft Office suite of applications.
- Katalin Susztak – scientist, nephrologist
- Thomas Stephen Szasz – (1920–2012) born Szász Tamás István in Budapest was an academic, psychiatrist and psychoanalyst. Noted for his books The Myth of Mental Illness (1961) and The Manufacture of Madness (1970).
- Victor Szebehely – scientist, a key figure in the development and success of NASA's Apollo program
- Gábor Szegő – mathematician
- Albert Szent-Györgyi – (1893–1986) Budapest born noted biologist, polymath and biochemist who won the Nobel Prize in Physiology or Medicine in 1937. He is credited with first isolating vitamin C.
- Leo Szilard – (1898–1964) born Leó Spitz in Budapest physicist, hypothesized the nuclear chain reaction in 1933, patented the idea of the nuclear reactor, invented the electron microscope patented the idea of a nuclear fission reactor in 1934.
- Edward Teller – (1908–2000) born in Budapest, Ede Teller was a Hungarian-American theoretical physicist and father of the hydrogen bomb.
- Mária Telkes
- Georg von Békésy – biophysicist
- Theodore von Kármán – scientist, "the father of supersonic flight"
- John von Neumann – (1903–1957) born Neumann János Lajos in Budapest, he was a Hungarian-American mathematician, physicist, computer scientist, engineer and polymath. Von Neumann was generally regarded as the foremost mathematician of his time. A key figure of developing the digital computer and game theory.
- "The Martians" (1881–2006) – term used to refer to a group of prominent Hungarian scientists (mostly, but not exclusively, physicists and mathematicians) who emigrated to the United States in the early half of the 20th century. Included in this group are Paul Erdős, Paul Halmos, Theodore von Kármán, John G. Kemeny, John von Neumann, George Pólya, Leó Szilárd, Edward Teller, and Eugene Wigner.
- Thomas Vietorisz – researcher and teacher in economics
- Eugene Wigner – (1902–1995) born Wigner Jenő Pál in Budapest. A Hungarian-American theoretical physicist, he also contributed to mathematical physics. He received the Nobel Prize in Physics in 1963 "for his contributions to the theory of the atomic nucleus and the elementary particles, particularly through the discovery and application of fundamental symmetry principles".
- Hugh David Politzer – physicist, Nobel Prize winner for the discovery of asymptotic freedom in quantum chromodynamics

=== Authors, scholars, editors ===
- Arcadius Avellanus – (1851–1935) born Mogyoróssy Arkád in Esztergom, Hungary was a Hungarian American scholar of Latin and a proponent of Living Latin. He emigrated to the US in 1878 where he adopted a Latin translation of his original name.
- Randolph Lewis Braham – (1922–2018) born Adolf Ábrahám to Hungarian speaking parents in Bucharest, Romania. A noted American historian and political scientist, he was a founding board member of the academic committee of the United States Holocaust Memorial Museum in Washington, D.C. He published dozens of books most of which deal with the Holocaust in Hungary.
- Csaba Csere – technical director and editor of Car and Driver magazine
- Mihaly Csikszentmihalyi – writer and psychologist
- Lawrence Dorr – short story author
- Susan Faludi – (1959-) American born Pulitzer Prize winning author and feminist. She was also awarded the Kirkus Prize in 2016 for In the Darkroom, about her transgender father.
- Ladislas Farago – (1906–1980) born László Faragó in Csurgó, Hungary was a journalist, author and WWII era military historian. Author of numerous books on espionage.
- Ben Ferencz – (1920–2023) born Benjamin Berell Ferencz in Hungarian Transylvania now Romania. He is an American lawyer and pacifist and was chief prosecutor for the U. S. Army at the Einsatzgruppen Trial, one of the 12 post World War II military trials held by the U.S. authorities at Nuremberg, Germany.
- Peter Hargitai – writer, poet, translator
- Chris Jansing (born Christine Kapostasy) – correspondent for NBC News, contributing reporter for the Today Show, NBC Nightly News, and contributing anchor on MSNBC
- Peter W. Klein – journalist, documentary filmmaker, director of Global Reporting Centre
- Tony Laszlo – freelance journalist
- Ernst Lorsy - translator and journalist
- John Lukacs – historian, writer, professor
- Rebecca Makkai – (1978-) American-born author, Pulitzer Prize finalist for the novel The Great Believers
- Kati Marton – author
- Chris Molnar – writer, editor and publisher
- Nicholas Nagy-Talavera – dissident, historian, writer and professor
- Raphael Patai – (1910–1996) born in Budapest, Hungary as Ervin György Patai. He was a noted historian, folklorist and ethnographer of the Jewish people publishing dozens of books on the subject. Most notable are Apprentice in Budapest: Memories of a World That Is No More (1988) and The Jews of Hungary: History, Culture, Psychology (1996).
- Joseph Pulitzer – (1847–1911) born in Makó, Kingdom of Hungary, was a Hungarian-American politician and newspaper publisher of the St. Louis Post-Dispatch and the New York World. He became a leading national figure in the Democratic Party and was elected congressman from New York. The Pulitzer Prize is given in his name.
- David Rozgonyi – (born 1976), author and world traveler
- John Simon – (1925–2019) born John Ivan Simmon in Hungarian speaking Szabadka, in the former Yugoslavia, now Subotica, Serbia); American author and literary, theater, and film critic

=== Musicians, conductors, and composers ===
- Bob Babbitt – Motown bassist and member of the Funk Brothers, born to Hungarian parents
- Béla Bartók
- Zoltan Bathory – guitarist and founder of metal band Five Finger Death Punch
- Imre Czomba – (1972-) composer, orchestrator, and musician. Imre is a voting member of the Hungarian Film Academy, Grammy Recording Academy, Emmy Television Academy, and the American Society of Composers and Lyricists.
- Peter Cetera – singer, bassist, composer, and producer, formerly of the band Chicago; has stated his Hungarian heritage in interviews and on his website, but has not revealed his mother's birth/maiden name
- Jon Deak – bassist, New York Philharmonic
- Ernst von Dohnányi – (1877–1960) born Dohnányi Ernő in Pozsony, Kingdom of Hungary, Austria-Hungary, now Bratislava, Slovakia, he was a conductor, pianist and composer of classical music.
- Flea – bassist of Red Hot Chili Peppers
- George Feyer – (1908–2001) born György Fejér in Budapest. He studied classical piano at the Franz Liszt Academy of Music in Budapest. In the US he switched to lighter music and was house pianist for decades at the Cafe Carlyle and later at the Stanhope Hotel's Rembrandt Room both in New York.
- Endre Granat – violin virtuoso concertmaster
- Halsey – singer
- Keith Jarrett – jazz and classical pianist and composer
- Laszlo Gardony – jazz pianist and composer
- Kesha – pop musician; grandmother is of Hungarian descent
- Rachael Lampa
- Margaret Matzenauer
- Alanis Morissette
- John Németh – soul and blues singer-songwriter and harmonicist; father is from Hungary
- Eugene Ormandy – (1899–1985) born Jenő Blau in Budapest, was a world renowned conductor best known for his 44 years with the Philadelphia Orchestra as its music director.
- John Popper – singer/harmonicist of Blues Traveler
- Charlie Puth – singer-songwriter, brother of Stephen Puth, father is German and Hungarian
- Suzi Quatro – American singer-songwriter, musician, and actress; Hungarian mother
- Tommy Ramone – (1949–2014) born Tamás Erdélyi in Budapest was the drummer for the influential punk rock band the Ramones. He was a 1956 Hungarian refugee with his parents.
- Miklós Rózsa – (1907–1995) born in Budapest. The three time Oscar winning film composer was trained in Germany. He composed over one hundred film scores.
- Hunt Sales – rock drummer for Todd Rundgren, Iggy Pop and Tin Machine; son of Soupy Sales
- Tony Sales – rock bassist for Todd Rundgren, Iggy Pop and Tin Machine; son of Soupy Sales
- Mike Shinoda – member of Linkin Park; mother is of Hungarian descent
- Gene Simmons – (1949-) born Chaim Witz in Haifa, Israel to Hungarian born parents and known professionally as Gene Simmons, was the bassist and co-lead singer of the rock band Kiss.
- Paul Simon – (1941-) born in New York to Hungarian parents. World famous musician, singer and composer and half of the duo Simon and Garfunkel.
- Alec John Such - (1951–2022) - musician, former member of Bon Jovi
- Gábor Szabó – jazz guitarist
- Gábor Szakácsi – rock musician, member of Sledgeback
- Irving Szathmary (1907–1983) born Isidore Szathmary in Quincy, Massachusetts he was a Hungarian-American musical composer and arranger and best known for scoring the Get Smart television series. He was musical arranger for Benny, Goodman, Artie Shaw, Paul Whiteman, Frank Sinatra and Jack Teagarden. He was the youngest brother of comedian Bill Dana.
- George Szell – (1897–1970) born György Széll in Budapest, he was a noted conductor, composer and musical director of The Cleveland Orchestra.
- Zoltan Teglas – bands Ignite and Pennywise
- Tommy Vig – jazz vibraphonist, born in Budapest
- André Watts – (1946-) born in Nuremberg, Germany to a Hungarian pianist mother and an African American father. A pianist, he is a professor at the Jacobs School of Music at Indiana University.

=== Politicians ===
- Becca Balint – (1968-) – Congresswoman from Vermont (2023–); former president pro tempore of the Vermont Senate (2021–2023), Majority Leader of the Vermont Senate (2017–2021), and Vermont state senator (2015–2023)
- Antony Blinken – (1962-) born in Yonkers, NY. He's the 71st U.S. Secretary of State (2021–2025)
- Chris Gabrielli – 2006 Massachusetts candidate for governor
- Joseph Gaydos – former Pennsylvania congressman (1968–1993)
- Agoston Haraszthy – former California state assemblyman
- Alan G. Hevesi – (1940-) both parents were Holocaust survivors born in Hungary. Hevesi is a former New York politician and a convicted felon currently in prison.
- Ernest Istook – former Congressman from Oklahoma (1993–2007)
- John Kerry (1943-) – his paternal grandparents were Austro-Hungarian immigrants. Formerly the 68th United States Secretary of State (2013–2017). As of January 20, 2021 he is the U.S. Special Presidential Envoy for Climate.
- Jeffrey D. Klein (1960-) – New York State Senator or Representative of the Bronx, NY (2005–2018), member of the New york State Assembly, 1994–2004.
- Fiorello H. LaGuardia – former mayor of New York City (1934–1945); Hungarian mother
- Tom Lantos – (1928–2008) born Tamás Péter Lantos in Budapest was a noted American politician and member of the Democratic Party who served as a U.S. representative from California from 1981 until his death in 2008.
- Tibor P. Nagy – (1949-) born in Budapest, Hungary. He was the 19th Assistant Secretary of State for African Affairs (2018–2021) and US Ambassador to Ethiopia (1999–2022)
- Peter R. Orszag – (1968-) banker and former government official. Both parents were Hungarian immigrants. He was the 37th Director of the Office of Management and Budget (OMB) under President Barack Obama and had also served as the Director of the Congressional Budget Office (CBO). He is a member of the National Academy of Medicine of the National Academies of Sciences.
- George Pataki – (1945-) former Governor of New York (1995–2006); father was Hungarian.
- Sebastian Gorka – Deputy Assistant to the President (2017)
- Julie Kirchner – Citizenship and Immigration Services Ombudsman
- Ernie Konnyu – former Congressman from California (1987–1989)
- Thomas Vajda – U.S. Ambassador to Myanmar (2021–2022)
- Ted Weiss (1927–1992) – Congressman from New York (1977–1992), New York City Councilor (1962–1976)

=== Arts, fashion, design, architecture, hospitality industry ===
- André Balazs – (1957-) American-born businessman and hotelier son of Hungarian parents. His top properties include The Mercer Hotel in SoHo, NY, the Chateau Marmont in Los Angeles, and The Standard hotel in West Hollywood. Along with his father, Endre Balazs, he co-founded a biotechnology company called Biomatrix in 1988.
- Steven Brust – writer
- Marcel Breuer – (1902–1981) born in Pécs, Hungary. Bauhaus educated Modernist architect and furniture designer. Noted works; The Whitney Museum of American Art (currently the Met Breuer) 1966, the Wassily chair 1925.
- Leo Castelli – (1907–1999) born Leo Krausz in Trieste, Austria-Hungary. Prominent art collector, dealer and New York gallerist.
- Tibor de Nagy – (1908–1993) born in Debrecen, Hungary. Noted art collector and New York gallerist.
- Edward L. Doheny – oil tycoon
- Jolie Gabor, Countess de Szigethy (1896–1997) born Janka Tilleman in Budapest was a Hungarian-born American jeweler and socialite, known as the mother of actresses and fellow socialites Magda, Zsa Zsa and Eva Gabor. Jolie Gabor was the aunt of Annette Tilleman (1931-daughter of Jolie's brother Szebasztian Tilleman, and wife of Hungarian-American U.S. Representative Tom Lantos.
- Magda Gabor – (1915–1997) born Magdolna "Magda" Gábor was an actress and socialite, and the elder sister of Zsa Zsa and Eva Gabor.
- Karoly Grosz – film poster artist
- Andrew (Andy) S. Grove – (1936–2016) born András István Gróf in Budapest and a 1956 refugee, he was a businessman, engineer, author and a pioneer in the semiconductor industry and CEO of Intel Corporation.
- Agoston Haraszthy – (1812–1869) born in Pest (before it was united with Buda), Kingdom of Hungary. Founder of the Buena Vista Winery in Sonoma, California. He wrote a two volume book in 1844, Utazás Éjszakamerikában (Travels in North America).
- Theodore Hardeen – Harry Houdini's brother, illusionist, magician, escape artist.
- John D. Hertz – businessman, founder of The Hertz Corporation
- Karoly Hokky – former Czechoslovak senator
- Harry Houdini – (1874–1926) born Erik Weisz in Budapest. World famous illusionist, magician, escape artist and stunt performer.
- Mary Katharine "Big Nose Kate" Horony – longtime companion and common-law wife of Old West gunfighter Doc Holliday
- Calvin Klein – (1942-) Bronx, New York born son of Hungarian immigrants. Acclaimed internationally, he is a celebrated fashion designer and executive.
- Alex Koroknay-Palicz – executive director of National Youth Rights Association
- Michael Kovats – founder of the U.S. Cavalry
- Eugene Lang – philanthropist
- George Lang (1924–2011) born György Deutsch in Székesfehérvár, Hungary. Lang wrote a memoir, Nobody Knows the Truffles I've Seen, 1998 and The Cuisine of Hungary 1971. He was the owner of the Café des Artistes (1975–2009) and in 1992 restored the famous Budapest restaurant Gundel.
- Paul László – architect, interior designer
- Estée Lauder – co-founder of Estée Lauder cosmetics company
- Judith Leiber – (1921–2018) born Judit Pető in Budapest. Renowned fashion and handbag designer. Noted for her bejeweled minaudières.
- George Pal – animator
- Christina Pazsitzky – comedian
- Thomas Peterffy – entrepreneur, founder of Interactive Brokers Group
- Willy Pogany – illustrator of children's and other books
- Emery Roth – (1871–1948) born Róth Imre in Gálszécs, Austria-Hungary, now Secovče, Slovakia. Noted architect of classic Art Deco buildings in New York City, First Hungarian Reformed Church of New York, The Eldorado, The San Remo, The Normandy among many others.
- M. Lincoln (Max) Schuster – (1897–1970) born in Kałusz Austria Hungary, now Kalush, Ukraine was an American book publisher and the co-founder of the publishing company Simon & Schuster.
- George Soros – speculator, investor, philanthropist, and political activist
- Thomas Szasz – psychiatry professor
- Louis Szathmary – chef, writer, and public personality
- Adam D. Tihany – (1948-) born in Transylvania the former Hungarian territory of present-day Romania. A designer of some of the best hotels and restaurants throughout the world.
- Steven F. Udvar-Házy – business mogul in the aviation industry, philanthropist
- Ferenc A. Váli – lawyer, author, and political analyst
- Adrienne Vittadini – (1943-) born in Győr, Hungary is a noted American fashion designer. She fled the Hungarian Revolution in 1956 with her parents.
- Roland A. Wank – (1898–1970) Hungarian modernist architect, best known for his work for the Tennessee Valley Authority in the United States.

=== Military ===
- Donald H. Bochkay – Air Force fighter pilot and flying ace during Second World War
- Robert Ivany – Army major general and commandant of the United States Army War College
- Laszlo Rabel – Army soldier and Medal of Honor recipient

== See also ==
- Hungarian Americans
- List of Hungarians
- Hungarian Spectrum
- Hungarian House of New York
- American Hungarian Foundation
