= Gyulai =

Gyulai may refer to:

- Gyulai is a Hungarian family surname. Gyulai is a brand type of Hungarian sausage

== People ==
- Ignaz Gyulai (1763–1831), Austrian Empire general of the Napoleonic Wars
- Ferencz Gyulai (1798–1868), also known as Ferenc Gyulai, Ferencz Gyulaj, or Franz Gyulai, Hungarian nobleman who served as Austrian Governor of Lombardy-Venetia and commanded the losing Austrian army at the Battle of Magenta.
- István Gyulai (1943–2006), Hungarian television commentator and General Secretary of the IAAF
- Katalin Gyulai, Hungarian sprint canoeist
- Líviusz Gyulai (1937–2021), Hungarian graphic artist, printmaker, and illustrator
- Márton Gyulai (born 1979), Hungarian bobsledder
- Elemér Gyulai (1904–1945), Hungarian-Jewish composer

== See also ==
- Gyulay (nobility)
- Gyula, a city in Hungary
