= In Memoriam: Hungarian Composers, Victims Of The Holocaust =

Studio album by Márta Gulyás, Vilmos Szabadi, Péter Bársony, and Ditta Rohmann
- Released: 2008
- Genre: Classical

In Memoriam: Hungarian Composers, Victims Of The Holocaust is a 2008 classical music album by pianist Márta Gulyás with Vilmos Szabadi (violin), Péter Bársony (viola), Ditta Rohmann (cello) and other artists from the Hungaroton stable.

== Track listing ==
- Pál Budai: "Doll Doctor: Short Dances" Márta Gulyás (piano), Emese Mali (piano)
- Elemér Gyulai: "Lullaby" Bernadette Wiedemann (mezzo-soprano), Márta Gulyás
  - Air Márta Gulyás
- György Justus: "Jazz Suite" Márta Gulyás
- Sándor Kuti: "Serenade for string trio", Vilmos Szabadi (violin), Péter Bársony (viola), Ditta Rohmann (cello)
  - Sonata for Solo Violin Vilmos Szabadi (violin)
- Sándor Vándor: "Air" Ditta Rohmann (cello piccolo), Márta Gulyás (piano)
- László Weiner: "Duo for Violin and Viola" Vilmos Szabadi (violin), Péter Bársony (viola)
