= Vandor =

Vandor is a surname. Notable people with the surname include:

- Augusto Vandor (1923–1969), Argentine trade unionist and politician
- Douglas Vandor (born 1974), Canadian rower
- Ivan Vandor (born 1932), Italian composer, musician, and ethnomusicologist
- Joseph Vandor (1909–1979), Roman Catholic priest
- Sándor Vándor (1901–1945), Hungarian Jewish composer
