= Elemér Gyulai =

Hungarian composer

Elemér Gyulai (1904–1945) was a Hungarian composer. His "Lullaby", sung by mezzo-soprano Bernadette Wiedemann and accompanied by pianist Márta Gulyás, is featured on the 2008 album In Memoriam: Hungarian Composers, Victims Of The Holocaust.

He died on the Russian Front in 1945.
