= Nagybajom =

- Town
- Flag Coat of arms

- Location of Somogy county in Hungary

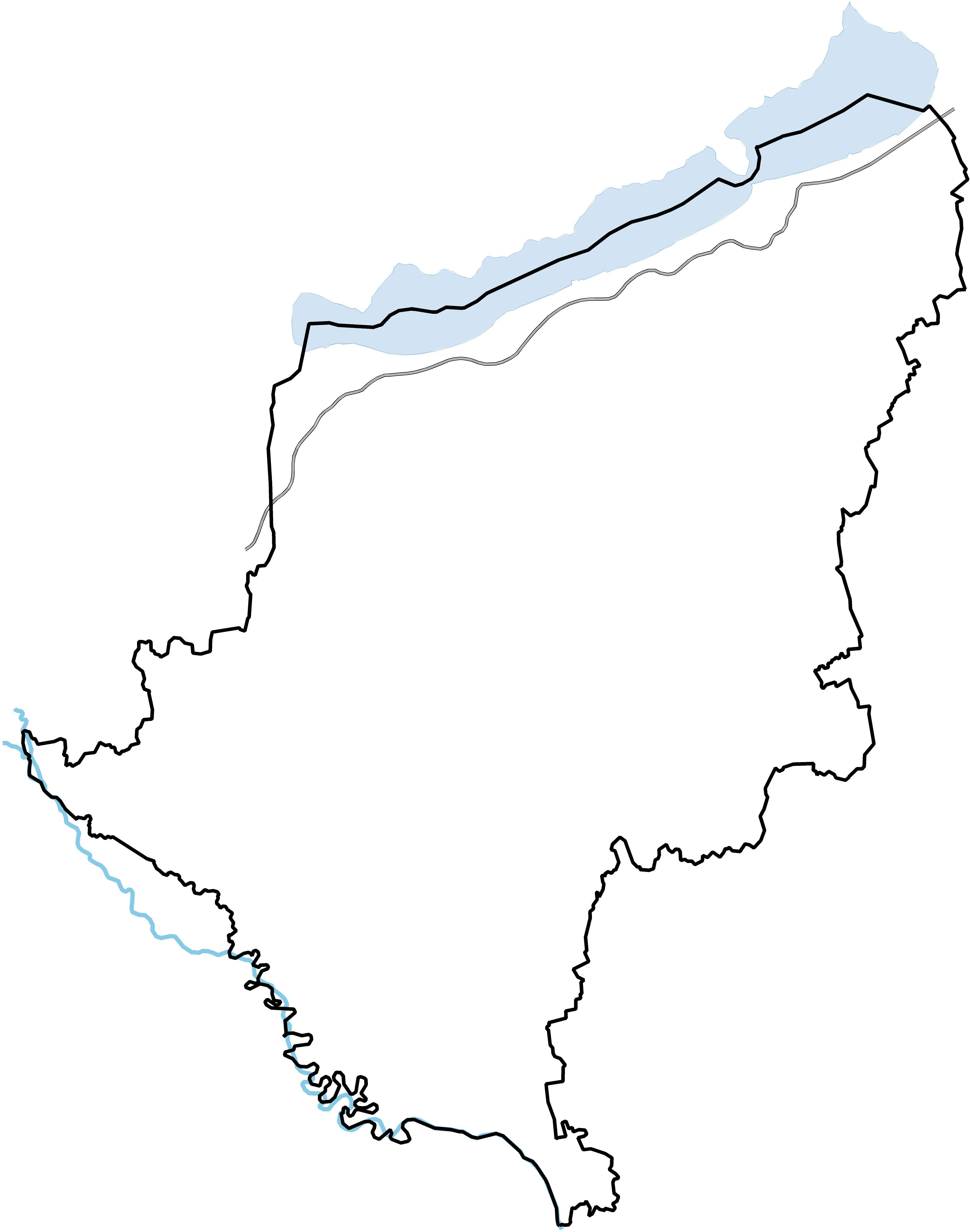
- Location of Nagybajom Nagybajom (Hungary)
- Coordinates: 46.39918°N 17.50793°E
- Country: Hungary
- Region: Southern Transdanubia
- County: Somogy
- District: Kaposvár
- RC Diocese: Kaposvár

Area
  - Total: 108.77 km^{2} (42.00 sq mi)

Population (2017)
  - Total: 3,312
  - Density: 30.45/km^{2} (78.86/sq mi)
- Demonym: nagybajomi
- Time zone: UTC+1 (CET)
  - Summer (DST): UTC+2 (CEST)
- Postal code: 7561
- Area code: (+36) 82
- Patron Saint: Jesus Christ
- NUTS 3 code: HU232
- MP: József Attila Móring (KDNP)
- Website: Nagybajom Online

Nagybajom is a town in Somogy County, Hungary.

== History ==
According to László Szita the settlement was completely Hungarian in the 18th century.

== Notable residents ==
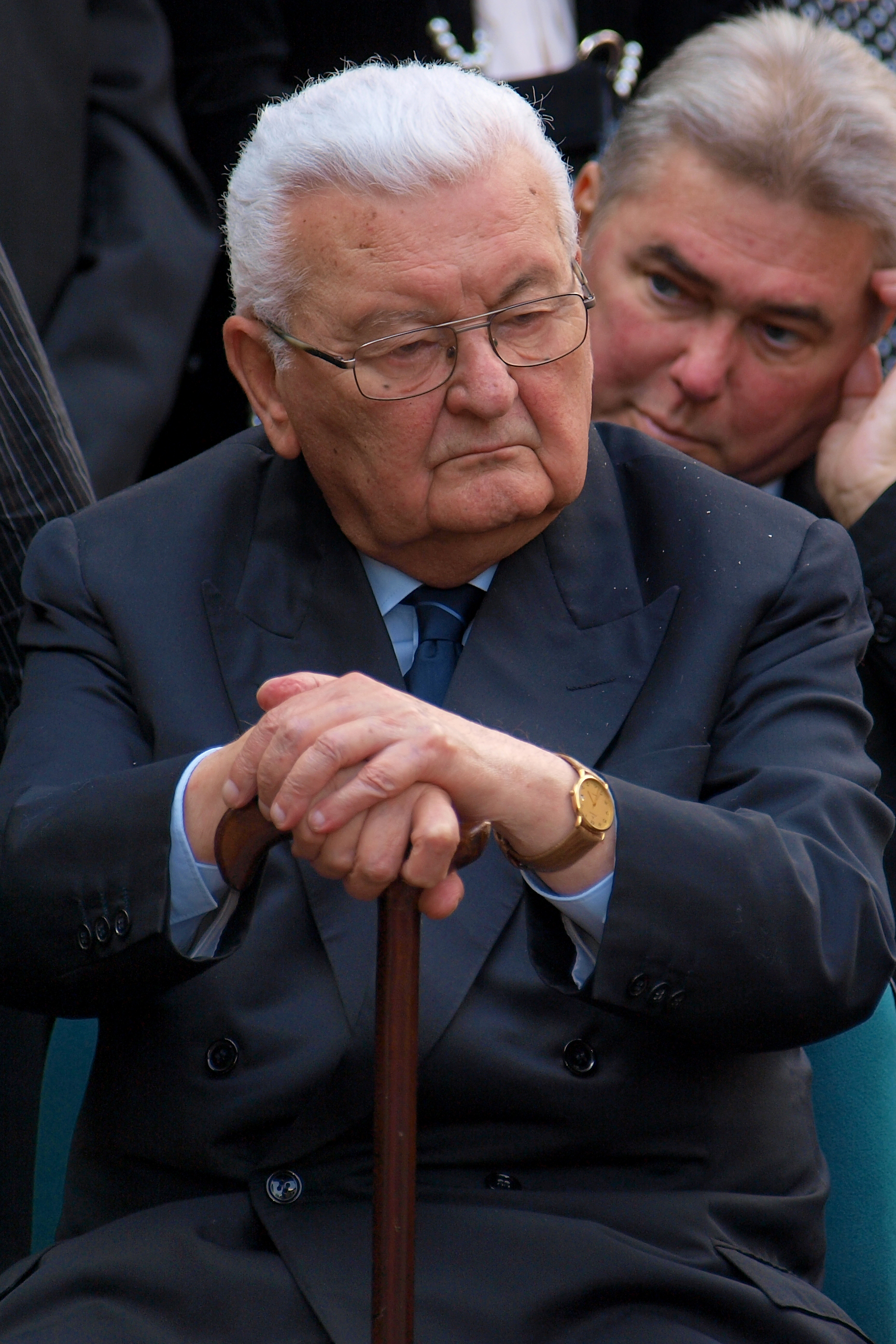
Péter Boross was the Prime Minister of Hungary between 1993 and 1994

- Benedek Virág (1752 or 1754 – 1830), Hungarian teacher, poet, translator
- Ádám Pálóczi Horváth (1760 – 1820), Hungarian poet, author
- Péter Boross (born 1928), Hungarian politician, Prime Minister of Hungary (1993 - 1994)
- Paul Tenczer, Jewish editor and activist (1836–1905)
