= Hungarian House of New York =

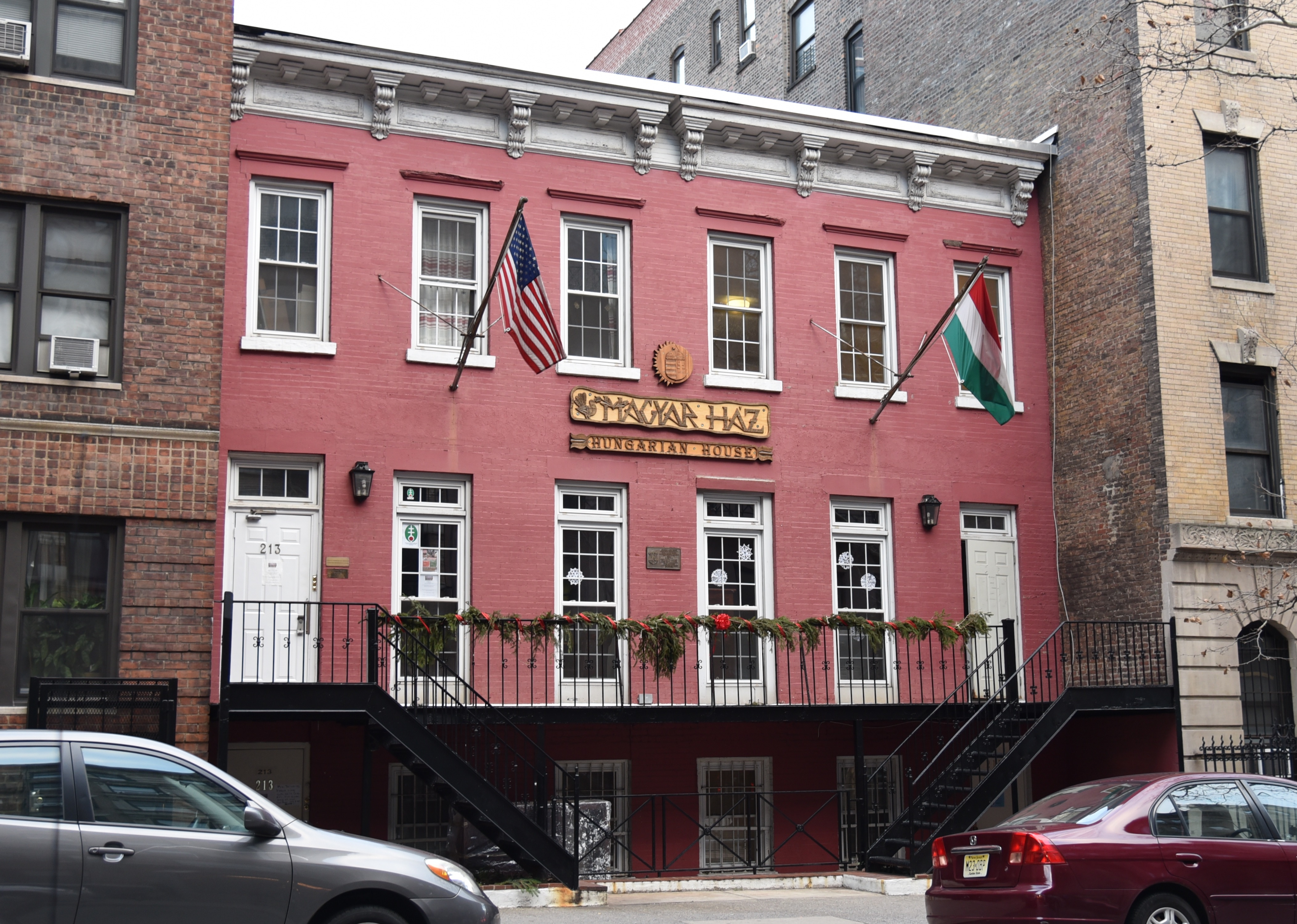
The Hungarian House of New York, 82nd street

The Hungarian House of New York, founded in 1966, serves Hungarian communities of New York City as an independent cultural institution. It is located at 213 East 82nd Street on the Upper East Side of Manhattan. It hosts and organises weekly as well as single events, and gives place to a Hungarian library and to the János Arany Hungarian School.

== History ==
Five Hungarians – Peter Schell, Ede Neuman de Végvár, Károly Pulvári, Ferenc Chorin and Tibor Eckhardt, operating within the framework of the Széchenyi István Society, the Hungarian Catholic League, and the American Hungarian Library and Historical Society – established the American Foundation for Hungarian Literature and Education (AFHLE) on August 23, 1963. It was officially registered as a non-profit organization by the New York state government on April 16, 1964.

Initially, the AFHLE occupied two row houses on 82nd Street. With the generous support of their founding members, the three organizations purchased the building at 213-215 East 82nd Street from the German athletic club Central Turnverein of the City of New York on September 9, 1966, when the AFHLE assumed responsibility for its maintenance. Over the years, the Catholic League handed over its ownership rights to local Hungarian Franciscans, who in turn passed it on to the Hungarian Scout Association in Exteris, which has been the third co-owner organization ever since.

The Hungarian House of New York is owned by three non-profit organizations: the American Hungarian Library and Historical Society, the Hungarian Scout Association in Exteris, and the Széchenyi István Society.

According to the Articles of Incorporation, the co-owners can only pass on ownership rights to organizations with similar objectives, and strictly with the consent of the other two co-owners. Furthermore, in the event the AFHLE were to be dissolved and the Hungarian House sold, none of the co-owners shall benefit from the proceeds, and the entire amount is to be offered to organizations engaged in Hungarian scientific and cultural activities.

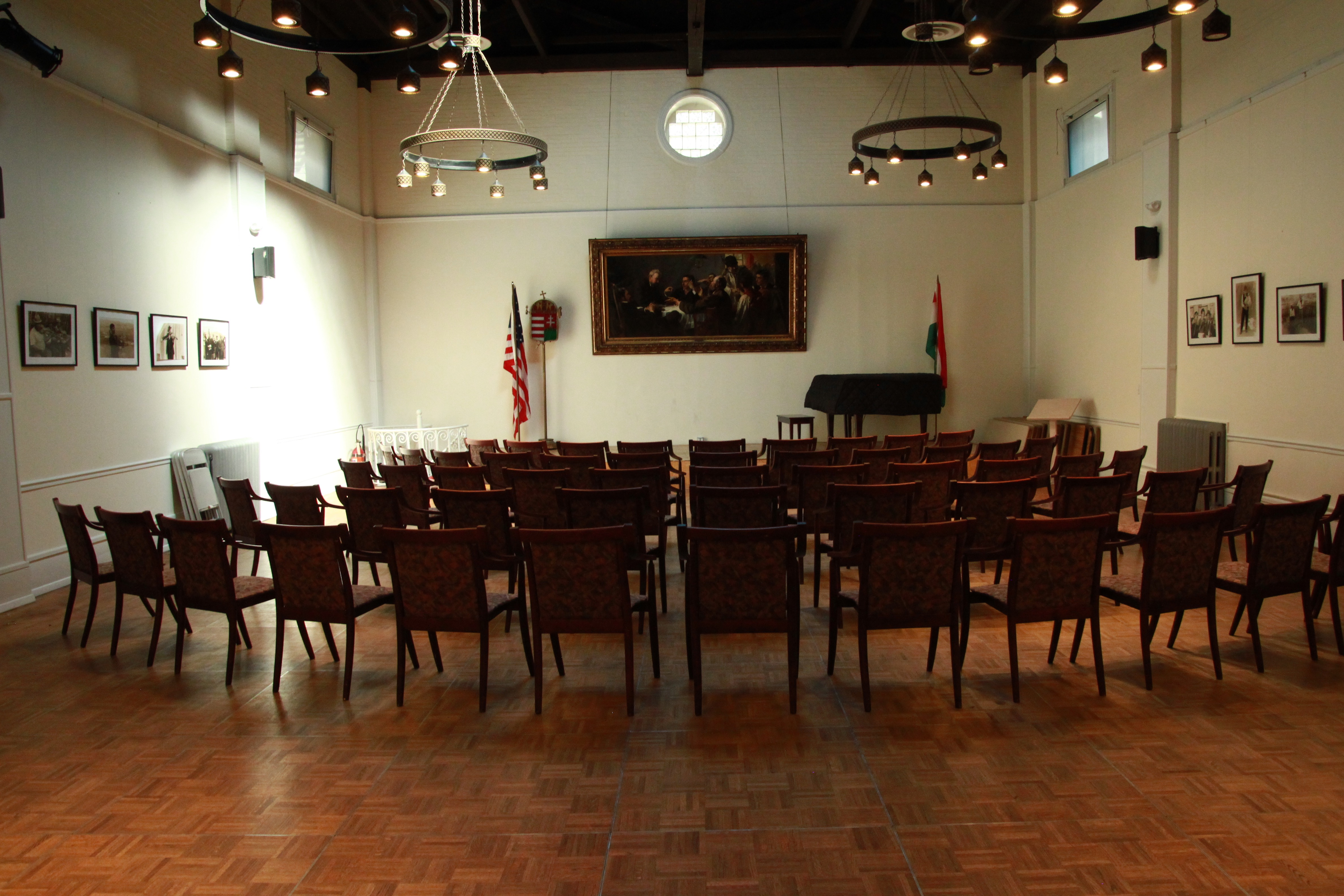
The interior of the Hungarian House of New York

The Hungarian House has welcomed numerous leading personalities over the years. József Antall, the first democratically elected Prime Minister of Hungary after the fall of Communism in 1989, visited the Hungarian House of New York, as did Presidents Árpád Göncz and Pál Schmitt, Cardinal József Mindszenty Prince Primate of Hungary, Member of the European Parliament Otto von Habsburg, nuclear physicist Edward Teller, Nobel laureate physicist Dennis Gábor, Cardinal Péter Erdő Primate of Hungary, and László Kövér President of the Hungarian Parliament.

Numerous lectures, concerts, film screenings, productions, folk dances, exhibitions, fairs, dinners, gatherings, Hungarian and English language classes took place in these halls, all of them serving both the Hungarian émigrés and the host country. Between 1974 and 1975, 24 Hungarian organizations utilized the Hungarian House, according to the minutes of the AFHLE.
