= Gyulay =

Gyulay (pronounced [ˈɟulɒi]) is a surname of Hungarian origin. People bearing the surname Gyulay and Gyulai come from Hungary. During early 20th century many moved to other parts of the world and predominantly reside today in the United States. People with the name Gyulay include:

== Counts of Gyulay ==
- Count Gyulay of Maros-Némethi and Mádaska (Hungarian: marosnémeti és nádaskai gróf Gyulay család, German: Graf Gyulay von Maros-Németh und Nádaska)
- Gyulay Ferenc (1674–1728) (hu)
- Sámuel Gyulay (1723–1802) (hu)
- Albert Gyulai (1766–1836), son of Samuel (hu)
- Ignaz Gyulai (1763–1831), son of Samuel (hu)
- Ferenc (József) Gyulay (1798–1868) son of Ignaz (hu) https://www.napoleon.org/en/history-of-the-two-empires/biographies/ferencz-jozsef-franz-josef-gyulay/

== Other people ==
- Endre Gyulay (born 1930) (hu)
- István Gyulay (born ?), Hungarian sprint canoer
- Zsolt Gyulay (born 1964, Vác), Hungarian sprint canoer. https://www.nemzetisport.hu/english/2022/12/hungarian-olympic-committee-mob-it-is-impossible-to-live-without-goals-zsolt-gyulay
- Joseph Michael Gyulay (born 1957), Hungarian-American philanthropist and founder of Hesperina Group Limited. Masonic Charitable Foundations and 32nd degree Freemason

== See also ==
- Gyulai
- List of titled noble families in the Kingdom of Hungary
