= Ferenc Chorin Jr =

Jewish Hungarian-American lawyer and industrialist

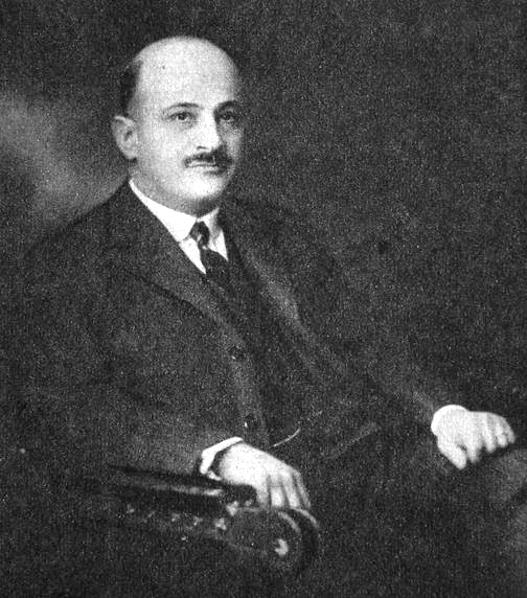
Image of Chorin Ferenc

Ferenc Chorin (March 3, 1879 – November 5, 1964), was a Jewish Hungarian-American lawyer and industrialist. He was expropriated and forced to flee by the Nazis.

== Life and work ==
Ferenc Chorin (also known in as Francis Chorin) was born on 3 March 1879 in Budapest to a wealthy Jewish-Hungarian family. His father was Ferenc Chorin Sr. His great-grandfather Áron Chorin was the famous Chief Rabbi of Arad.

Chorin studied in Budapest and Berlin, graduating as a doctor of law in 1901 and as a lawyer in 1904. In 1918, he suspended his career as a lawyer and was appointed CEO of the Salgótarján Coal Mining Company, and after his father's death in 1925, he became president of the company.

Chorin was baptised in 1919. In 1921 he married Daisy Weiss, daughter of the industrialist Manfred Weiss. This marriage created an unprecedented concentration of industrial and banking capital. In 1925, they had a daughter, Daisy Chorin.

In 1925 he was elected vice-president of the National Federation of Industrialists, and from 1928 to 1942 he was president. In 1925, he founded the Employers' Centre, of which he was the first president. In 1927 he became a member of the House of Lords. His advice was often sought in the highest government circles. He used all his influence in favour of an Anglo-Saxon orientation and against the threat of Nazism. He was in close contact with István Bethlen, Jenő Horthy, the governor's brother, as well as with prominent Catholic ecclesiastical figures.

== Nazi era ==
Chorin fought against the rise of the Nazis. He provided financial support to the Hungarian National newspaper Magyar Nemzet, founded in 1938, and through the GYOSZ he provided financial support to the daily newspaper Világ and, following his father's example, to Nyugat.

Adolf Eichmann studied the Weiss/Chorin industrial empire in Hungary intending to seize it for the Nazi war machine.

With the German invasion in March 1944, Chorin was forced to hand over his assets to the Germans, in exchange for permission to leave Hungary. As soon as the war ended, he wanted to return to Hungary, but the gradual Communist takeover prevented this. His assets in Hungary were confiscated. The Weiss Manfréd Works were taken over by the communists after the Nazis, and the nationalised factory complex was named after Mátyás Rákosi, the party's and the country's number one leader.

== Postwar ==
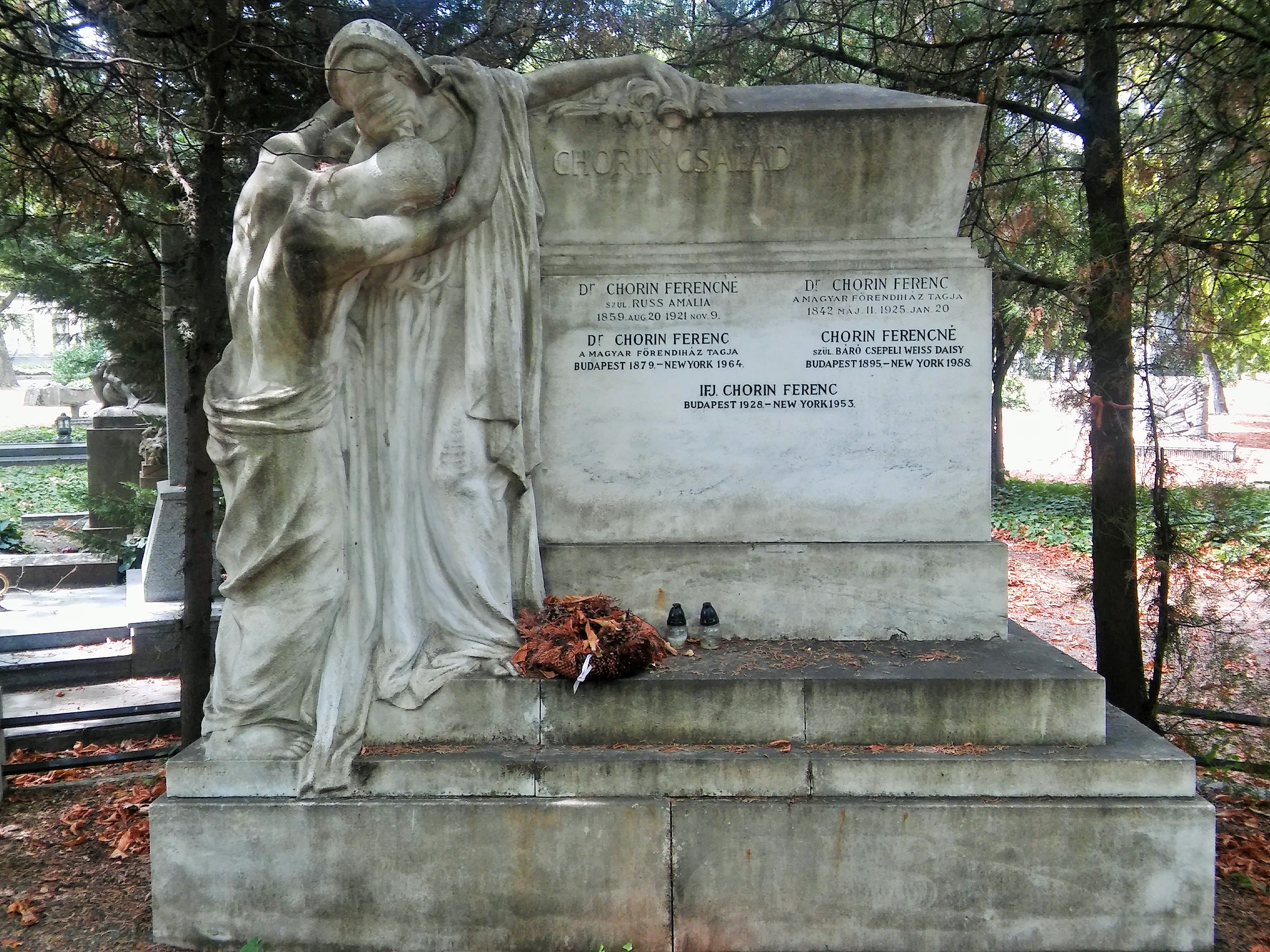
A Chorin-család sírja a Kerepesi temetőben

After the Second World War, Chorin settled in New York in the United States, where he founded several businesses and served as co-chairman of the Hungarian National Committee. His home was a centre of emigration. He died in New York on November 5, 1964. In accordance with his will, his ashes were brought home to Hungary and buried in the family cemetery in Kerepesi.

== Legacy ==
In 1998, a memorial plaque was erected to Ferenc Chorin Sr. and Ferenc Chorin Jr. on the wall of the Salgótarján Mining Museum (1 Zemlinszki Rezső Street). It reads. In memory of the chairmen of the board of directors of Salgótarján Kőszénbánya Rt. who played a significant role in the economic life of the company."

A short film on the life and work of Ferenc Chorin was also made in the Hungarian Historical Hall of Faces series (2001)

== Restitution of looted art ==
In 2022 the Boston Museum of Fine Arts restituted View of Beverwijk by Ruysdael to the heirs of the Chorin family. The MFA had acquired it through the British art dealer Edward Speelman in 1982. It had been listed in a 1998 publication on Hungarian war losses with an incorrect image and description.

== See also ==
- The Holocaust in Hungary
- List of claims for restitution for Nazi-looted art
- Manfréd Weiss Steel and Metal Works
- German invasion of Hungary
- Róbert Kreutz
- Ferenc Bajáki

== Sources ==
- Magyar életrajzi lexikon:Chorin Ferenc
- Chorin Ferenc., holokausztmagyarorszagon.hu
- Karsai László: Horthy Miklós (1868–1957) Beszélő, 2007. március, 12. évfolyam, 3. szám
- Dr. Czettler Antal: Kortársi szemmel egy vitáról, Magyar Nemzet, 2007. február 2.
- A szürke eminenciás: ifj. Chorin Ferenc, magyarzsido.hu

== More information ==
- Az Andrássy úttól a Park Avenue-ig. Fejezetek Chorin Ferenc életéből, 1879–1964; sajtó alá rend., szerk., jegyz. Bán D. András, bev. Strasserné Chorin Daisy, előszó Habsburg Ottó; Osiris, Bp., 1999
