= Paul Tenczer =

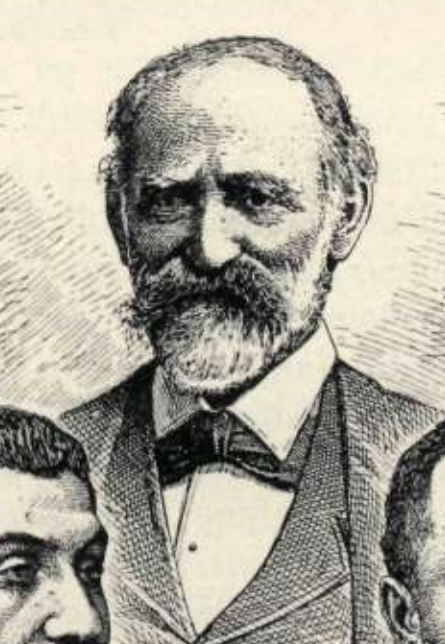
Tenczer Paul Portrait

Paul Tenczer, Hungarian author; born at Nagybajom April 11, 1836; died at Budapest February 6, 1905. He was educated at Keszthely and in Budapest, where he studied law. In 1861 he was one of the founders of the society for the naturalization and emancipation of Hungarian Jews; and from 1862 to 1867 he edited the Magyar Izraelita, the organ of that society. In 1868 he was elected a member of the Diet, in which he was one of the leaders of the Radical party.

Tenczer founded the periodicals Magyar Ujság and Neues Politisches Volksblatt, the latter of which he edited for eighteen years. He was prominent both in Jewish and in communal affairs in Budapest, and it was due to his efforts that tuition was made free in the public schools of the Hungarian capital.
