= Biomatrix systems theory =

Biomatrix systems theory claims to be an integrated systems theory. It was developed through an interdisciplinary PhD programme at the University of Cape Town. The aim being to identify generic organising principles of all systems and the differences between social, natural and technological systems. Biomatrix systems theory can be depicted graphically through different combinations of symbols, referred to as the Biomatrix graphic alphabet. It includes various arrows, symbols for their continuity, symbols for the forces of organisation and a shape denoting a field. Biomatrix systems theory focuses on processes as systems in their own right (referred to as activity systems), and the emergence from the interaction of activity systems, giving rise to larger (entity) systems. The Biomatrix is therefore a process-based systems model as opposed to a structure-based one.

The term biomatrix refers to the whole web of life, in biomatrix terminology to a network of thread-like activity systems and knot-like entity systems. The word itself is derived from the Greek concept of bios, life within the universe, and matrix, a mould or pattern indicating its configuration.
