= György Justus =

Hungarian composer

György Justus (1898–1945) was a Hungarian Jewish composer. His 1928 "Jazz Suite" for piano is featured on the 2008 album In Memoriam: Hungarian Composers, Victims Of The Holocaust.
