= Katalin Susztak =

Hungarian-American nephrologist

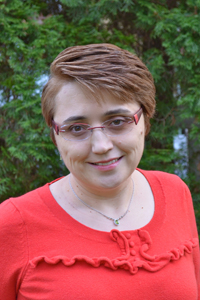
- Born: Eger, Hungary
- Education: Semmelweis University, Albert Einstein College of Medicine
- Occupation: Nephrologist

Katalin Susztak (Suszták) is a Hungarian American scientist and nephrologist at the Perelman School of Medicine at the University of Pennsylvania. She is a professor of medicine and genetics, and currently the codirector of the Complications Unit at the Institute for Diabetes, Obesity and Metabolism. Her laboratory made major contributions to the current understanding of kidney disease development. She is also the founder of the Transformative Research In DiabEtic NephropaThy (TRIDENT), a collaborative network of physicians and basic scientists, to find cures for diabetic kidney disease.

== Early life and education ==
Susztak was born in Eger, Hungary. She attended the Apáczai Csere János High School, a magnet school in Budapest Hungary. She obtained her MD (1995), and PhD (1997) degrees with Summa Cum Laude from the Semmelweis University, in Budapest Hungary. She moved to the United States in 1997, where she completed an Internal Medicine residency (2000) and Nephrology fellowship (2003) at the Albert Einstein College of Medicine in New York. She also obtained a Master of Science in Clinical Research (M.S.) (2004) with distinction from Einstein College. She is Board certified in Internal Medicine (2000) and Nephrology (2002).

== Career ==
Susztak was faculty at the Albert Einstein College of Medicine as an Instructor (2003-2004), Assistant Professor (2004-2009) and as an Associate Professor (2009-2012). In 2012 she moved to the Perelman School of Medicine of the University of Pennsylvania as a tenured Associate Professor of Medicine. In 2017 she became a Professor of Medicine and Professor of Genetics at the Perelman School of Medicine of the University of Pennsylvania. In 2018 she became the Director of Complications Unit at the Institute of Diabetes and Metabolism. In 2016, she founded the TRIDENT consortium, a collaborative network of physicians and basic scientists, to find cures for diabetic kidney disease.

== Scientific contributions ==
Susztak has made important discoveries towards defining critical genes, cell types and mechanisms of chronic kidney disease. She published over 160 scientific articles. Her early work demonstrated the importance of podocyte apoptosis in diabetic kidney disease development. She was instrumental in defining genetic, epigenetic and transcriptional changes in diseased human kidneys. She identified novel kidney disease genes and demonstrated the contribution of the Notch signaling pathway and metabolic dysregulation to kidney disease development.

Susztak's laboratory generated the first unbiased, comprehensive kidney cell-type atlas using single cell transcriptomics. She identified that specific renal phenotypes are linked and likely caused by the dysfunction of specific cell types.

Her lab was the first to map the kidney epigenome and catalogue genotype-driven gene-expression variation (Expression quantitative trait loci; eQTL) in human kidneys. Integration of genome wide association (GWAS), eQTL and epigenome data has been essential to prioritize disease-causing genes and variants.

In follow-up animal model studies her laboratory conclusively demonstrated that the lysosomal beta-mannosidase, the adaptor protein DAB2, and Dachshund homolog 1 (DACH1) are important kidney disease risk genes. Her work established the role of proximal tubule cells, endolysosomal trafficking, metabolic and developmental pathways in kidney disease development. Furthermore, her group generated the first animal model and showed that genetic variants in Apolipoprotein L1 (APOL1) observed only in African American Americans cause kidney disease development.

Susztak's discoveries span genetics, genomics, epigenetics, molecular biology, physiology and nephrology, and have important translational relevance and considerable therapeutic potential.

== Awards ==
- 1992-95 Scholarship of the Republic of Hungary
- 2004 Young Investigator Award from the National Kidney Foundation
- 2006 Carl W. Gottschalk Research Scholar Award of the American Society of Nephrology/Kidney Urology Foundation
- 2008 Mary Jane Kugel Award from the Juvenile Diabetes Foundation
- 2008 Wilhelm Kriz Award of the Podocyte Meeting
- 2011 Elected member American Society for Clinical Investigation
- 2011 Young Investigator Award of the American Society of Nephrology and the Kidney Council of the American Heart Association
- 2020 Elected Member of the Association of American Physicians (AAP)
- 2021 Richards award (lifetime achievement) of the International Society of Nephrology
- 2021 William Osler Patient Oriented Research Award from the University of Pennsylvania
