= Edra Toth =

Hungarian-American ballet dancer (born 1952)

Edra Toth (born September 18, 1952) is a Hungarian-American ballet dancer who studied under E. Virginia Williams with the Boston Ballet. Edra Toth came to the United States in 1956 as a Hungarian refugee and grew up in Boston, MA.

At sixteen years old, Toth danced as a prima ballerina with Ivan Nagy for the 1969 Boston Ballet production of Giselle at Jacob's Pillow Dance Festival. Throughout Toth's career with the Boston Ballet, she danced in multiple principal roles such as the Sugar Plum Fairy in The Nutcracker, Aurora in Sleeping Beauty, and Odette in Swan Lake. In 1971, Toth partnered with New York City Ballet's Edward Villella as she danced the role of Odette, and he as Siegfried, for a Boston Ballet performance.

As a Boston Ballet principal dancer, Toth also performed in other companies' productions. In 1971, she danced the role of Juliet for Nicolas Petrov and the Pittsburgh Ballet Theatre's first production of Romeo and Juliet. And, in 1973, Toth danced in the S. Hurok Presents production of Apollo and Les Sylphides where she performed pas de deux with Rudolph Nureyev. After she left Boston Ballet, Toth danced with the Boston Repertory Ballet founded by Samuel Kurkjian.

Toth founded several ballet schools throughout her career beginning with New England Ballet where she specialized her instruction using the Bournonville method. In 2002, Edra Toth began the Edra Toth Academy of Dance & Music in Wolfeboro, New Hampshire and Dover, New Hampshire.

Toth resides in New Hampshire and teaches ballet students as well as directs and choreographs ballets for the Northeastern Ballet Theatre.
