= Ludwig Wysber =

Hungarian writer

Ludwig Wysber (Hungarian: Wysber Lajos; 1817, Pest - ?), a Jewish Hungarian journalist and author.

He was originally a street peddler in Pest, he obtained employment as a chorus singer in the German theater of that city, and afterward held minor positions on several local newspapers. At the outbreak of the March Movement in 1848, he obtained permission to publish Der Patriot, while Julian Chownitz (or Chowanetz), a Jew who had been active as a revolutionist, was given permission to publish Die Opposition. These two journals represented Kossuth's party, and acquired considerable influence. Between 1850 and 1870 Wysber appears to have been guilty of numerous peculations among the merchants and clergy of Hungary, extending his operations even to Vienna. He employed various aliases, as "Arthur von Alaven," "Jonas Földváry," and "Wysbersi"; and warrants were issued for his arrest.

He was the author of Lebensbilder aus Ungarn, mentioned in Joseph Alexander von Helfert Geschichte Oesterreichs vom Ausgange des Wiener October Aufstandes 1848 (Prague, 1876; Appendix, p. 135, note 311).
