= David Rozgonyi =

American-Hungarian writer (born 1976)

- Born: October 18, 1976 (age 50); Tripoli, Libya
- Known for: Writing, Photography, Travel
- Website: davidrozgonyi.com

David Rozgonyi (born in 1976 in Libya) is an American/Hungarian author and world traveler.

== Early life ==
David Rozgonyi (born in 1976 in Libya) to Tibor Rozgonyi, a professor and mining engineer, and Agnes Somkuti Rozgonyi, a portraitist. Both parents were Hungarian nationals, and the family moved from Libya to (then) West Germany before relocating to Socorro, New Mexico, USA and later to Bryan, Texas, USA, where the family was naturalized as United States citizens in 1986. In 1990, the family relocated to Wollongong, NSW, Australia, where they lived until 1994. In 1994, Rozgonyi moved to Sydney, where he enrolled at the University of Sydney in pursuit of a degree in Psychology. However, when the family decided to relocate to Denver, Colorado, one year later, Rozgonyi transferred to Colorado State University in Fort Collins, Colorado, where he lived from 1996 until 2007. He has one half-brother, Laszlo Szigeti, who is the retired director of a German coal mine.

== Goat Trees: Tales from the Other Side of the World ==
Rozgonyi is the author of Goat Trees: Tales from the Other Side of the World (Wolverine Farm Publishing 2006; ISBN 0-9741999-6-6), a collection of short fiction written in and about places as diverse as Cambodia, Hungary, Japan, the South Pacific, China, and northern Africa. The collection was critically well-received: "Never have knowledge and art been so craftily distributed in a series of travel stories". The collection was also long-listed for the 2006 Believer Book Award. The book is dedicated to his ex-wife.

== Present career ==
He has recently completed work on his next novel, Two Dolphin, a post-colonial critique of the West’s exploitation of the East set in Cambodia and told through the examination of the interactions between an ecovillage and a traditional Khmer village. The unfinished manuscript won the Fort Collins Arts Alive Fiction Fellowship (2007).
