= Pál Budai =

- Born: 1906
- Died: 1944 or 1945 (aged 37-39)
- Occupation(s): Composer, hazzan

Pál Budai (1906 – 1944 or 1945) was a Hungarian Jewish composer. Budai was a Cantorial musician who also wrote music for Yiddish vaudeville productions. His witty "Doll Doctor: Short Dances" for two pianos is featured on the 2008 album In Memoriam: Hungarian Composers, Victims Of The Holocaust. The piece was published in 1966 and is probably a four-hand reduction of theater orchestra scores.
