= Sándor Kuti =

Hungarian composer

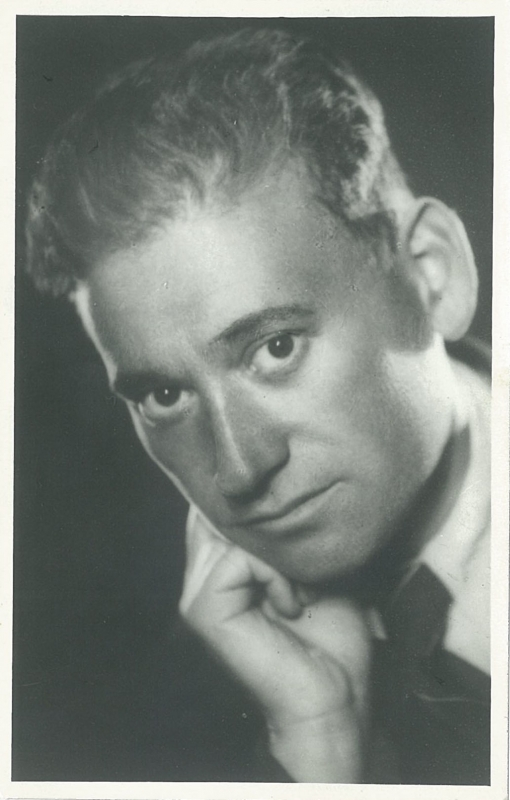
Sándor Kuti

Sándor Kuti (1908–1945?) was a Hungarian Jewish composer. His "Serenade for string trio" and a solo violin sonata are featured on the 2008 Hungaroton album In Memoriam: Hungarian Composers, Victims Of The Holocaust.
