= Charles Horvath =

American soccer player

Personal information
- Place of birth: Hungary
- Height: 5 ft 9 in (1.75 m)
- Positions: Forward; midfielder

Youth career
- 1968–1971: Cornell University

Senior career*
| Years | Team | Apps | (Gls) |
| 1960 | Újpesti Dózsa | | |
| 1961 | Montréal Concordia | | |
- New York Hungaria
| 1964 | Hamilton Steelers | | |
| 1965 | New Yorker | 1 | (0) |
| 1967 | Philadelphia Spartans | | |

International career
| 1964 | United States | 1 | (0) |
- * Club domestic league appearances and goals

Károly "Charles" Horváth was a soccer player who played in the National Professional Soccer League, International Soccer League, and German-American Soccer League. Born in Hungary, he earned one cap for the United States national team.

== Club career ==
He started his professional career at Újpesti Dózsa in Hungary. He moved to Canada as a teenager and played for Hungária SC Montréal and Montréal Concordia FC in the National Soccer League. In 1961, he helped Montréal Concordia win the Canadian Carling's Red Cap Trophy (Challenge Trophy). In 1962, Horvath was with the New York Hungaria of the German American Soccer League when they won the National Challenge Cup. He remained with Hungaria through at least 1964 and also played in the Eastern Canada Professional Soccer League with the Hamilton Steelers. In 1965, he played with the New Yorkers of the International Soccer League, and later returned to the ECPSL to play with Montréal Italica. Finally, in 1967, he spent a single season with the Philadelphia Spartans of the National Professional Soccer League.

== National team ==
Horvath earned his one cap with the national team in a 10–0 loss to England on 27 May 1964.
