= Sándor Vándor =

Sándor Vándor (1901–1945) was a Hungarian Jewish composer.

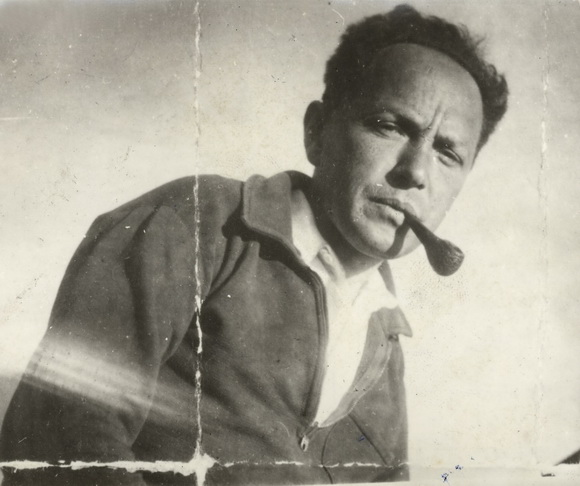
Sándor Vándor, was a Hungarian Jewish composer.

== Recordings ==
Recordings
Work	Artist	Album title	Year	Label
Air for cello and piano	Ditta Rohmann, Márta Gulyás	In Memoriam: Hungarian Composers, Victims Of The Holocaust	2008	Hungaroton
Various songs	Ensemble for These Times	The Hungarians	2018	Centaur Records
Sonatina for solo viola	Stefano Zanobini	Musica & Regime 4	2020	NovAntiqua Records
