= Márta Gulyás =

Hungarian classical pianist (born 1953)

Márta Gulyás (born 1953 in Gyula, Hungary) is a classical pianist and a professor of piano and chamber music.

== Biography ==
Márta Gulyás studied piano at the Liszt Ferenc University for Music in Budapest with Erzsébet Tusa and István Lantos. In 1976, she received the artistic and pedagogic diplomas there. She then completed a post-graduate program at the Tschaikowski Conservatory in Moscow with professor Dmitri Bashkirow. In 2001, she habilitated at the Liszt Ferenc University and was awarded the title of Magistra Habilitatam.

Since then, she teaches piano and chamber music at the Liszt Ferenc University, first as assistant professor, later as associated professor, then as honorary professor. Since 1991, she is also visiting professor at the "Escuela Superior Reina Sofia" in Madrid, Spain.

In addition to numerous concerts in Hungary, Márta Gulyás also performed in most countries of Europe and in the United States, as well as in the near and far East, i.e. in Japan, Kasakhstan, Cyprus, Israel, and Syria. In recent years, her focus has turned towards chamber music. She has given and continues to give masterclasses in many countries.

Márta Gulyás is the artistic director of the international encounter of music together with the Academy of Santander.

Márta Gulyás is a repeated member of the jury of major piano and chamber music competitions in Spain. She has repeatedly been interviewed on TV and Radio.

Márta Gulyás speaks Hungarian, Russian, German, English, and also French, Spanish and Italian.

== Awards and recognitions ==
- MIDEM Prize for Bartók‘s Early Chambermusik (with Vilmos Szabadi)
- Hungarian Culture-Prize 1985
- Liszt Ferenc Prize 1998
- Medal of Honor from Queen Sofia of Spain 2014 and 2018
- Leó Weiner Memorial Award 2017
- Hungarian State Order of Merit 2018
- Medal of the Albeniz Foundation 2024

== Recordings ==
CD Recordings with Hungaroton (Hungary). Numerous Recordings with Hungarian Radio, BBC, Bavarian Radio, NDR, WDR, Finnish Radio, Radio France, and Radio Orpheo (Moscow).
