= Ferenc Chorin =

Hungarian politician

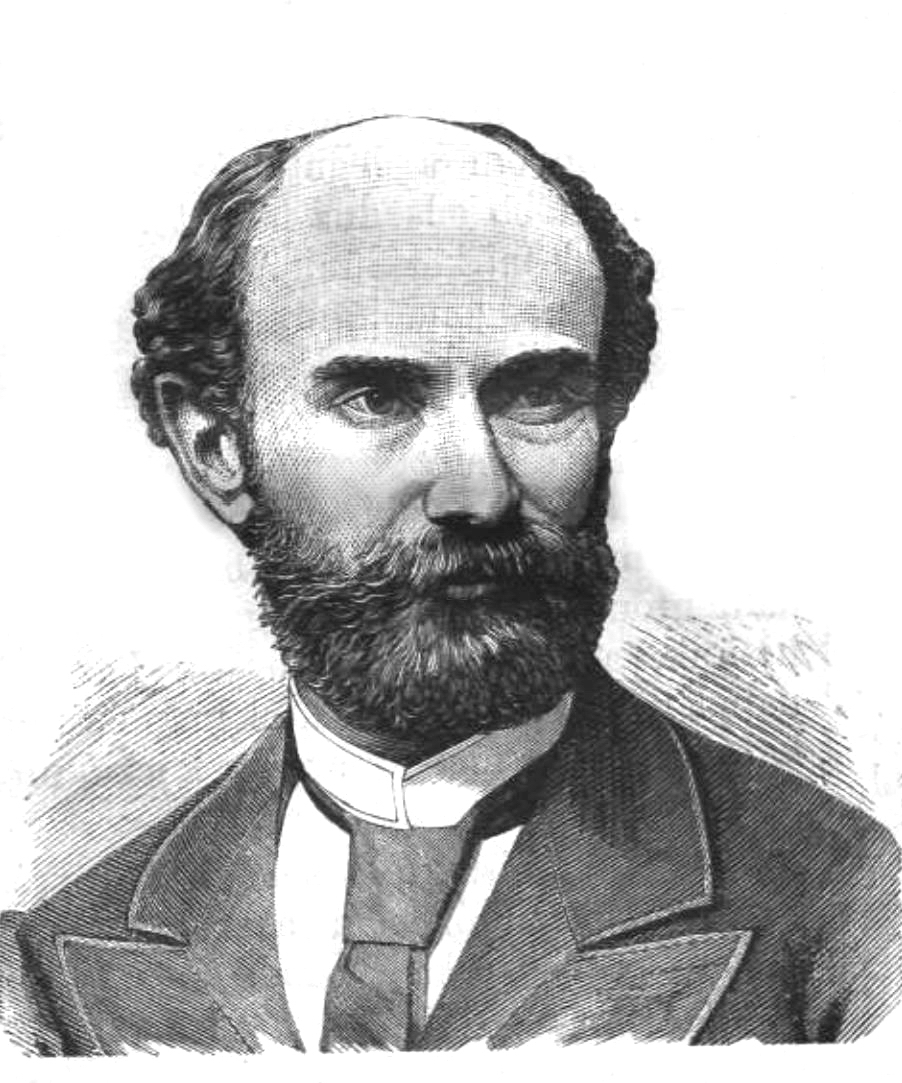
Chorin in 1878

Ferenc Chorin (Arad 11 May 1842 – Budapest, 20 January 1925) was a Hungarian politician and a member of the National Assembly of Hungary.

He was born in Arad, Kingdom of Hungary, Austrian Empire (today in Romania) and descended from a rabbi. He was among the first Jews elected to the Hungarian parliament (1867). He converted to Christianity and was made a life member of the parliament's upper house, the House of Magnates (1903). Apart from politics, he was a mining company executive. He died in Budapest and is buried in the Kerepesi cemetery.

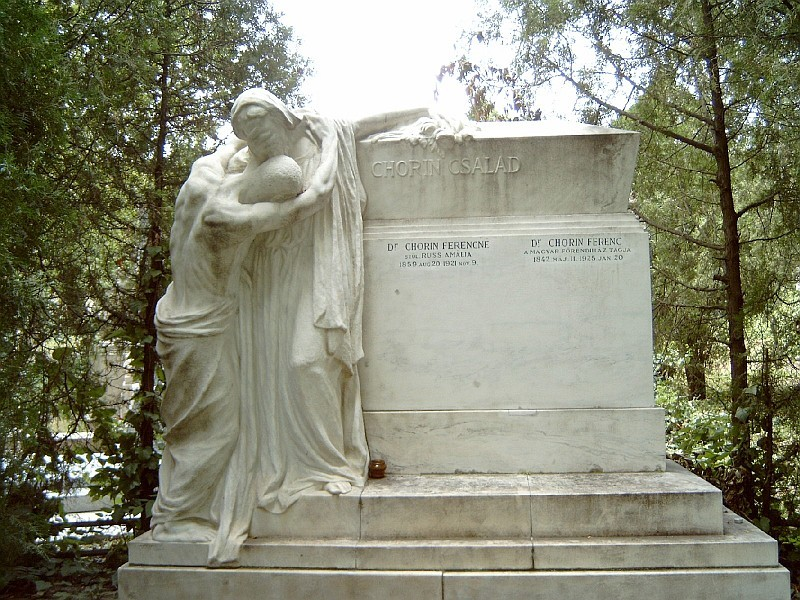
Chorin's grave monument.
