= List of Scotland international footballers born outside Scotland =

This is a list of players who have played international football for the Scotland national football team and who were born outside Scotland. For the purposes of international football, the global governing body FIFA considers Scotland, England, Wales and Northern Ireland to be distinct and individual countries. This has happened since the early days of international football, as Arthur Kinnaird, 11th Lord Kinnaird (born in England) and Henry Renny-Tailyour represented Scotland in the 1870s. The first black international football player, Andrew Watson, was born in British Guiana and represented Scotland during the 1880s.

The majority of these players were born in England. In a friendly match against Cyprus in November 2011, five of the sixteen players used by Scotland were born in England. The rules of selection were quite strict until 1971, when national teams were allowed to pick players if one of their parents were born in that country. This was later relaxed to allowing selection for one grandparent being born in Scotland, although it was temporarily tightened again, which prevented Nigel Spackman from playing for Scotland. The Home Nations have since made an agreement that also allows players who have been educated for at least five years in the relevant country to be selected by its national team. Jordan Rhodes was selected on this basis.

== List of players ==
Modern day countries of birth
Country	Total
England	56
Canada	3
Australia	2
India	2
South Africa	2
Guyana	1
Isle of Man (Note: The Isle of Man does not have an internationally recognised national team; the Isle of Man Football Association is affiliated to the English Football Association as a County Football Association.)	1
Malaysia	1
Northern Ireland	1
Sweden	1
United States	1

Key

*	Still active for the national team
§	Still active in professional football

As of Scotland v North Macedonia, 13 November 2026

Scotland national football team players born outside of Scotland
Player	Refs.	Place of Birth		Caps	Goals	Debut		Last or most recent match	
Player	Refs.	City	Country (Note: Country and flag at the time of birth is shown.)	Caps	Goals	Date	Opponent	Date	Opponent
Ché Adams* (Note: Never played club football in Scotland.)		Leicester	England	51	13	25 March 2021	Austria	13 November 2026	North Macedonia
Graham Alexander		Coventry	England	40	0	17 April 2002	Nigeria	5 September 2009	Macedonia
Jordan Archer§ (Note: Played club football in Scotland and England.)		Walthamstow	England	1	0	30 May 2018	Peru	30 May 2018	Peru
Phil Bardsley		Salford	England	13	0	12 October 2010	Spain	5 March 2014	Poland
Alex Bell		Cape Town	Cape Colony	1	0	16 March 1912	Ireland	16 March 1912	Ireland
Luis Binks*		Gillingham	England	3	0	29 September 2026	Switzerland	6 October 2026	Slovenia
Dave Bowman		Royal Tunbridge Wells	England	6	0	25 March 1992	Finland	13 October 1993	Italy
George Boyd		Chatham	England	2	0	26 March 2013	Serbia	28 May 2014	Nigeria
Liam Bridcutt		Reading	England	2	0	26 March 2013	Serbia	29 March 2016	Denmark
Jacob Brown§		Halifax	England	8	0	12 November 2021	Moldova	19 November 2023	Norway
Tom Cairney§		Nottingham	England	2	0	22 March 2017	Canada	23 March 2018	Costa Rica
Kris Commons		Mansfield	England	12	2	20 August 2008	Northern Ireland	6 February 2013	Estonia
Tommy Conway*		Taunton	England	8	0	7 June 2024	Finland	31 March 2026	Ivory Coast
Liam Cooper§		Kingston upon Hull	England	19	0	6 September 2019	Russia	3 June 2024	Gibraltar
Alex Cropley		Aldershot	England	2	0	13 October 1971	Portugal	10 November 1971	Belgium
Paul Devlin		Birmingham	England	10	0	15 October 2002	Canada	6 September 2003	Faroe Islands
Scott Dobie		Workington	England	6	1	16 May 2002	South Korea	20 November 2002	Portugal
Lyndon Dykes*		Gold Coast	Australia	53	10	4 September 2020	Israel	19 June 2026	Morocco
Matt Elliott		Wandsworth	England	18	1	12 November 1997	France	6 October 2001	Latvia
Steven Fletcher		Shrewsbury	England	33	10	26 March 2008	Croatia	20 November 2018	Israel
Tyler Fletcher*		Manchester	England	2	0	30 May 2026	Curaçao	6 June 2026	Bolivia
Danny Fox		Winsford	England	4	0	14 November 2009	Wales	16 October 2012	Belgium
Eadie Fraser		Goderich	Canada	5	4	27 March 1880	Wales	12 March 1883	Wales
Willie Fraser		Melbourne	Australia	2	0	16 October 1954	Wales	3 November 1954	Northern Ireland
Mike Galloway		Oswestry	England	1	0	16 October 1991	Romania	16 October 1991	Romania
Matt Gilks		Rochdale	England	3	0	15 August 2012	Australia	10 September 2013	North Macedonia
Andy Goram		Bury	England	43	0	16 October 1985	East Germany	25 March 1998	Denmark
Jonathan Gould		Paddington	England	2	0	9 October 1999	Lithuania	15 November 2000	Australia
Richard Gough		Stockholm	Sweden	61	6	30 March 1983	Switzerland	28 April 1993	Portugal
Andy Gray		Harrogate	England	2	0	2 April 2003	Lithuania	27 May 2003	New Zealand
Angus Gunn*		Norwich	England	30	0	25 March 2023	Cyprus	13 November 2026	North Macedonia
David Harvey		Leeds	England	16	0	15 November 1972	Denmark	8 September 1976	Finland
John Hewie		Pretoria	South Africa	19	2	14 April 1956	England	4 May 1960	Poland
George Hirst*		Sheffield	England	10	1	20 March 2025	Greece	6 June 2026	Bolivia
Don Hutchison		Gateshead	England	26	6	31 March 1999	Czech Republic	15 November 2003	Netherlands
Colin Jackson (Note: Never played club football in England.)		London	England	8	1	16 April 1975	Sweden	15 May 1976	England
Max Johnston*		Middlesbrough	England	4	0	20 March 2025	Greece	8 September 2025	Belarus
Liam Kelly§		Newport Pagnell	England	1	0	14 November 2012	Luxembourg	14 November 2012	Luxembourg
Joe Kennaway		Point St. Charles, Montreal	Canada	1	0	29 November 1933	Austria	29 November 1933	Austria
Arthur Kinnaird		Kensington	England	1	0	8 March 1873	England	8 March 1873	England
John Little		Calgary	Canada	1	0	6 May 1953	Sweden	6 May 1953	Sweden
Craig Mackail-Smith		Watford	England	7	1	27 March 2011	Brazil	26 May 2012	United States
Willie Maley		Newry	Ireland	2	0	25 March 1893	Ireland	1 April 1893	England
Stuart McCall		Leeds	England	40	1	28 March 1990	Argentina	25 March 1998	Denmark
Shaun Maloney		Miri	Malaysia	47	7	8 October 2005	Belarus	4 June 2016	France
Jamie Mackie		Dorking	England	9	2	8 October 2010	Czech Republic	16 October 2012	Belgium
Chris Martin		Beccles	England	17	3	28 May 2014	Nigeria	8 October 2017	Slovenia
Russell Martin		Brighton	England	29	0	25 May 2011	Wales	26 March 2017	Slovenia
Oli McBurnie*		Leeds	England	21	0	23 March 2018	Costa Rica	13 November 2026	North Macedonia
Jay McEveley		Liverpool	England	3	0	22 August 2007	South Africa	26 March 2008	Croatia
Scott McTominay*		Lancaster	England	74	15	23 March 2018	Costa Rica	13 November 2026	North Macedonia
James Morrison		Darlington	England	46	3	30 May 2008	Czech Republic	5 October 2017	Slovakia
Graeme Murty		Saltburn	England	4	0	18 February 2004	Wales	17 October 2007	Georgia
Liam Palmer§		Worksop	England	8	0	21 March 2019	Kazakhstan	31 March 2021	Faroe Islands
Callum Paterson§		London	England	17	0	29 May 2016	Italy	12 November 2020	Serbia
Matt Phillips§		Aylesbury	England	16	1	26 May 2012	United States	9 September 2019	Belgium
Nigel Quashie		Southwark	England	14	1	27 May 2004	Estonia	6 September 2006	Lithuania
Henry Renny-Tailyour		Mussoorie	British India	1	1	8 March 1873	England	8 March 1873	England
Jordan Rhodes		Oldham	England	14	3	11 November 2011	Cyprus	22 March 2017	Canada
Bruce Rioch		Aldershot	England	24	6	13 May 1975	Portugal	11 June 1978	Netherlands
Matt Ritchie		Gosport	England	16	3	25 March 2015	Northern Ireland	23 March 2018	Costa Rica
Neil Simpson		Hackney	England	5	0	24 May 1983	Northern Ireland	21 May 1988	England
Cieran Slicker§		Oldham	England	1	0	6 June 2025	Iceland	6 June 2025	Iceland
Robbie Stockdale		Redcar	England	5	0	17 April 2002	Nigeria	21 August 2002	Denmark
Neil Sullivan		Sutton	England	28	0	27 May 1997	Wales	12 February 2003	Republic of Ireland
Kieran Tierney*		Douglas	Isle of Man	59	2	29 March 2016	Denmark	13 November 2026	North Macedonia
Jimmy Wardhaugh		Berwick-upon-Tweed	England	2	0	8 December 1954	Hungary	7 November 1956	Northern Ireland
Jimmy Walker		Detroit	United States	1	0	23 January 1946	Belgium	23 January 1946	Belgium
Andrew Watson		Demerara	British Guiana	3	0	12 March 1881	England	11 March 1882	England
Bob Wilson		Chesterfield	England	2	0	13 October 1971	Portugal	1 December 1971	Netherlands
Paul Wilson		Bangalore	India	1	0	5 February 1975	Spain	5 February 1975	Spain

== Only played in England ==
A large number of Scottish internationals born in Scotland never played senior club football in that country, either due to the circumstances of their upbringing; for example Alex Donaldson, Jimmy Nelson (raised in Belfast rather than England, settled in Wales after playing for Cardiff City), Tommy Lawrence, Scot Gemmill, Dominic Matteo, Richard Hughes, Ikechi Anya (who also played in the Spanish leagues) and Dominic Hyam, or being scouted by clubs in England at a young age and remaining in the English football league system or abroad throughout their career; this includes several who reached the landmark of 25 caps such as Billy Liddell, Denis Law, Billy Bremner, Willie Donachie, Asa Hartford, Frank Gray, John Robertson, John Wark, Colin Calderwood, Darren Fletcher, Barry Bannan and Billy Gilmour.

Conversely, Joe Baker had only played in the Scottish football league system when he was capped by his birthplace England in 1959 – he was the first player to be in that situation. His elder brother Gerry Baker was also raised in Scotland but had been born in the United States and later appeared for their national team.

== Played for a different national team ==
Countries with Scottish born players
Country	Total
Australia	56
United States	47
New Zealand	34
Canada	10
Republic of Ireland	10
Northern Ireland	7
Ireland	5
Hong Kong	2
Wales	2
England	1
Malawi	1
Malaysia	1
Philippines	1
Trinidad and Tobago	1
Turks and Caicos Islands	1

Various players born in Scotland have played for a different national team.

Australia

- John Anderson
- Jim Armstrong
- Steve Blair
- Archie Blue
- George Blues
- Martin Boyle
- Peter Boyle
- Jimmy Cant
- Billy Cook
- Dave Cumberford
- Jock Cumberford
- Tommy Cumming
- Jason Cummings
- Ian Davidson
- Robbie Dunn
- Charlie Egan
- Alec Forrest
- Alec Heaney
- Andy Henderson
- Bobby Hogg
- Pat Hughes
- Sandy Irvine
- Tom Jack
- George Keith
- John Little
- James Love
- Jimmy Mackay
- Alan Marnoch
- Jim McCabe
- Tommy McColl
- Tom McCulloch
- John McDonald
- Garry McDowall
- Hamilton McMeechan
- Dave Mitchell
- Jim Muir
- Bill Murphy
- Kenny Murphy
- Johnny Orr
- Jamie Paton
- Jim Pearson
- Johnny Peebles
- George Raitt
- Jack Reilly
- Harry Rice
- Alex Robertson
- Jimmy Rooney
- Willie Rutherford
- Nigel Shepherd
- Harry Souttar
- John Stevenson
- Tom Tennant
- Sid Thomas
- Joe Watson
- Bob Wemyss
- Alan Westwater

Canada

- Scott Arfield
- Gordon Burness
- Geordie Campbell
- Roy Faulkner
- George Forrest
- John Kerr
- Ralph McPate
- Alex Shaw
- David Wotherspoon

England

- John Bain

Hong Kong

- Derek Currie
- Leon Jones

Ireland

- Patsy Gallacher
- William Kennedy Gibson
- Bob Milne
- Bob Morrison
- Jack Ponsonby

Malawi

- Kieran Ngwenya

Malaysia

- Fergus Tierney

New Zealand

- Jock Aird
- George Anderson
- Allan Boath
- Alex Caldwell
- Jim Christie
- George Cuthill
- Sandy Davie
- Grahame Davis
- Adrian Elrick
- Jim Ferrier
- Iain Gillies
- Iain Hastie
- Bill Hume
- Ken Ironside
- Murray Kay
- Joe Kissock
- George Lamont
- Andy Leslie
- Sam Malcolmson
- Iain Marshall
- Neil McArthur
- Jim McDougall
- Tom McNab
- Paddy McFarlane
- Duncan McVey
- Tom Methven
- Tony Moynihan
- Keith Nelson
- Jock Newall
- Bert Ormond
- Alf Stamp
- Charlie Steele Sr.
- Alex Stenhouse
- Joe Todd

Northern Ireland

- Justin Devenny
- Danny Hegan
- Matty Kennedy
- Ali McCann
- Brian McLean
- James McPake
- Paul Paton

Philippines

- James Hall

Republic of Ireland

- Owen Coyle
- Tommy Coyne
- Charlie Gallagher
- Patsy Gallacher
- Ray Houghton
- Mikey Johnston
- James McCarthy
- Aiden McGeady
- Bernie Slaven
- Rocco Vata

Trinidad and Tobago

- Kieran Ngwenya

Turks and Caicos Islands

- Paul Crosbie

United States

- Andy Auld
- Barney Battles Jr.
- Jim Brown
- Gordon Burness
- Bill Carnihan
- Willie Carson
- Neil Clarke
- Walter Dick
- Doug Farquhar
- Jock Ferguson
- Thomson Ferrans
- William Findlay
- Jimmy Gallagher
- Malcolm Goldie
- Willie Herd
- Stuart Holden
- Jack Hynes
- Findlay Kerr
- Dominic Kinnear
- Jack Lyons
- Jack Marshall
- John Mason
- Charlie McCully
- Henry McCully
- Tommy McFarlane
- Bart McGhee
- Johnny McGuire
- Ed McIlvenny
- Willie McLean
- Doug McMillan
- Peter Millar
- Robert Millar
- Roy Milne
- Johnny Moore
- Billy Morris
- Ed Murphy
- Tommy O'Hara
- George O'Neill
- David Robertson
- Edmund Smith
- Derek Spalding
- Archie Stark
- Tommy Stark
- Tommy Steel
- Andy Straden
- Doug Wark
- Alexander Wood

Wales

- Daniel Grey
- Alexander Jones

== See also ==
- Republic of Ireland players born in Scotland
- United States players born in Scotland
- Australia players born in Scotland
- England players born in Scotland
- Wales players born in Scotland
