= Edward Tate (disambiguation) =

Edward Tate (1877–1953) was an English cricketer.

Edward Tate may also refer to:

- Pop Tate (baseball) (Edward Christopher Tate, 1860–1932), Major League Baseball catcher
- Ned Tate (Edward Tate, 1901–1967), English footballer in Canada and the United States

== See also ==
- Edward Joseph Tait (1878–1947), Australian theatrical entrepreneur
