= List of United States men's international soccer players born outside the United States =

This article lists players who have represented the United States men’s national soccer team and who were born outside of the United States. Despite their place of birth, these players were eligible to play for the U.S. national team and earned international caps in official competitions or recognized matches.

Players included on this list generally fall into two broad categories: those who were born abroad to at least one American parent and therefore acquired U.S. citizenship by birth, and those who were born in another country and later immigrated to the United States, obtaining citizenship through naturalization. In both cases, eligibility to represent the United States was determined in accordance with FIFA eligibility rules.

Many were born across a wide range of regions, including Europe (particularly the United Kingdom, Netherlands and Germany), Latin America, Africa, Asia and Oceania. Their places of birth often correspond to historical patterns of migration, international employment, education, or military service.

A notable number of U.S. internationals born abroad were born to American parents temporarily living outside the country. In some cases, this was due to diplomatic postings, international business, or military assignments. For example, several players were born in Germany while a parent was stationed there as part of the United States Armed Forces. Although born overseas, these players often grew up in the United States and developed their soccer careers within the American system.

== List of the players ==
This section was last updated on October 8, 2026; The players highlighted in bold are currently representing the United States internationally.

Birthplace	Player	Caps	Goals	Debut	Last cap	Notes	Ref.
Argentina	Tony Bonezzi	1	0	1961	1961	He switched to Israel	
Argentina	Ivan Borodiak	1	0	1964	1964		
Argentina	Efrain Chacurian	4	1	1953	1954		
Argentina	Dan Califano	1	0	1973	1973		
Argentina	Angelo DiBernardo	20	3	1979	1985	Immigrated to the U.S. as a youth.	
Argentina	Paul DiBernardo	1	0	1985	1985	Immigrated to the U.S. as a youth.	
Argentina	Miguel Malizewski	3	0	1968	1968		
Argentina	Pablo Mastroeni	65	0	2001	2009	Immigrated to the U.S. as a youth.	
Argentina	Mike Noha	1	0	1964	1964		
Austria	Carl Fister	2	1	1960	1960		
Austria	Rudy Kuntner	2	2	1928	1928	Immigrated to the U.S. as a youth.	
Austria	Mike Winter	6	0	1972	1973	Immigrated to the U.S. as a youth.	
Austria	Wally Ziaja	4	0	1973	1973		
Belgium	Alain Maca	5	0	1973	1975	U.S. citizen at birth.	
Belgium	Joe Maca	3	1	1950	1950		
Bermuda	Dale Russell	1	0	1978	1978	Immigrated to the U.S. for college.	
Bolivia	Windsor Del Llano	1	0	1973	1973	He switched to Bolivia	
Bolivia	Carlos Scott	1	0	1975	1975	Immigrated to the U.S. as a youth.	
Bosnia and Herzegovina	Boris Bandov	33	2	1976	1983	Immigrated to the U.S. as a youth. Born in the SFR Yugoslavia	
Brazil	Alex Ely	4	0	1960	1965		
Brazil	Benny Feilhaber	44	2	2007	2017	Immigrated to the U.S. as a youth.	
Brazil	Carlos Metidieri	8	0	1973	1973		
Brazil	Curt Onalfo	1	0	1988	1988	U.S. citizen at birth.	
Brazil	Jorge Siega	8	0	1973	1973		
Cameroon	Tony Tchani	1	0	2016	2016	Immigrated to the U.S. as a youth. He switched to Cameroon	
Canada	Teal Bunbury	4	1	2010	2012	U.S. citizen at birth. He previously represented Canada at youth level	
Canada	Fred Cameron	5	0	1959	1969		
Canada	Mark Chung	24	2	1992	1998	Immigrated to the U.S. as a youth.	
Canada	John Kerr Jr.	16	2	1984	1995	Immigrated to the U.S. as a youth.	
Cape Verde	John DeBrito	6	0	1991	1992	Immigrated to the U.S. as a youth. Born in the Portuguese Cape Verde	
Cape Verde	Pedro DeBrito	1	0	1983	1983	Immigrated to the U.S. as a youth. Born in the Portuguese Cape Verde	
China	Mike Ivanow	10	0	1973	1975	U.S. citizen at birth.	
China	Archie Roboostoff	7	0	1973	1975	U.S. citizen at birth.	
Colombia	Jorge Acosta	12	0	1991	1992	Immigrated to the U.S. as a youth.	
Colombia	Juan Agudelo	28	3	2010	2018	Immigrated to the U.S. as a youth.	
Colombia	**Jesús Ferreira**	23	15	2020	2023	Immigrated to the U.S. as a youth.	
Colombia	Diego Gutiérrez	1	0	2001	2001	Immigrated to the U.S. as a youth.	
Colombia	Carlos Llamosa	29	0	1998	2002		
Costa Rica	Ringo Cantillo	11	0	1979	1982	Immigrated to the U.S. as a youth.	
Costa Rica	Sergio Mora	1	0	1972	1972		
Croatia	Tom Cecic	1	0	1968	1968	Born in the Independent State of Croatia	
Croatia	Tony Donlic	7	0	1977	1977	Born in the SFR Yugoslavia	
Croatia	Fred Grgurev	14	1	1973	1976	Born in the SFR Yugoslavia	
Croatia	Mark Liveric	16	3	1973	1980	Born in the SFR Yugoslavia	
Croatia	Njego Pesa	7	0	1979	1982	Immigrated to the U.S. as a youth. Born in the SFR Yugoslavia	
Czech Republic	Miro Rys	3	1	1976	1976	Immigrated to the U.S. as a youth. Born in Czechoslovakia	
Denmark	Svend Engedal	3	0	1956	1957		
Denmark	**Kristoffer Lund**	7	0	2023	2024	U.S. citizen at birth (mother). He previously represented Denmark at youth level.	
Ecuador	Chico Borja	11	3	1982	1988	Immigrated to the U.S. as a youth.	
Egypt	Amr Aly	8	0	1984	1985	Immigrated to the U.S. as a youth.	
El Salvador	Miguel Lopez	1	0	1977	1977	Immigrated to the U.S. as a youth.	
El Salvador	Hugo Pérez	73	13	1984	1994	Immigrated to the U.S. as a youth.	
England	**Sebastian Berhalter**	22	4	2025	2026	U.S. citizen at birth.	
England	John Best	1	0	1973	1973		
England	Gordon Bradley	1	0	1973	1973		
England	Michael Brady	3	0	1984	1985	Born in Chicago, moved to England at 6 months old, returned to the U.S. for college.	
England	George Brown	1	0	1957	1957	Immigrated to the U.S. as a youth.	
England	**Cameron Carter-Vickers**	19	0	2017	2025	U.S. citizen at birth.	
England	Paul Child	2	0	1973	1973		
England	Elvis Comrie	4	0	1984	1984	Immigrated to the U.S. as a youth.	
England	Irving Davis	5	0	1924	1925		
England	Dom Dwyer	4	2	2017	2017	Immigrated to the U.S. for college.	
England	Gary Etherington	7	0	1977	1979	Immigrated to the U.S. as a youth.	
England	Alan Green	1	0	1984	1984		
England	Dick Hall	4	0	1973	1975		
England	Alan Hamlyn	4	0	1972	1975		
England	Mick Hoban	1	0	1973	1973		
England	Bernie James	2	0	1988	1988	Immigrated to the U.S. as a youth.	
England	Barry Mahy	4	0	1973	1973		
England	Neil Megson	2	0	1988	1988	Immigrated to the U.S. as a youth.	
England	Alan Merrick	1	0	1983	1983	He previously represented England at youth level	
England	George Moorhouse	7	0	1926	1934		
England	Mike Renshaw	2	0	1973	1973		
England	**Giovanni Reyna**	47	10	2020	2026	U.S. citizen at birth.	
England	**Antonee Robinson**	62	5	2018	2026	U.S. citizen at birth.	
England	Arthur Rudd	2	0	1924	1924		
England	Terry Springthorpe	2	0	1953	1957		
England	Roy Turner	2	0	1973	1973		
France	Jeremy Ebobisse	1	0	2019	2019	Immigrated to the U.S. as a youth.	
France	Romain Gall	1	0	2018	2018	Immigrated to the U.S. as a youth.	
Germany	Orest Banach	4	0	1969	1972	Immigrated to the U.S. as a youth.	
Germany	Terrence Boyd	14	0	2012	2016	U.S. citizen at birth. Born in West Germany	
Germany	**John Brooks**	45	3	2013	2021	U.S. citizen at birth. He previously represented Germany at youth level	
Germany	Timothy Chandler	29	1	2011	2016	U.S. citizen at birth. Born in West Germany	
Germany	Otto Decker	1	2	1953	1953		
Germany	Rolf Decker	4	0	1953	1955		
Germany	Thomas Dooley	81	7	1992	1999	U.S. citizen at birth. Born in West Germany	
Germany	**Damion Downs**	7	0	2025	2026	U.S. citizen at birth. He previously represented Germany at youth level	
Germany	Dieter Ficken	1	0	1972	1972	Immigrated to the U.S. as a youth.	
Germany	**Julian Gressel**	6	0	2023	2023	Immigrated to the U.S. for college.	
Germany	Jermaine Jones	69	4	2010	2017	U.S. citizen at birth. Born in West Germany. He previously represented Germany	
Germany	Fabian Johnson	57	2	2011	2017	U.S. citizen at birth. Born in West Germany. He previously represented Germany at youth level	
Germany	Jerome Kiesewetter	2	0	2016	2016	U.S. citizen at birth.	
Germany	Cornell Krieger	4	0	1965	1965		
Germany	**Lennard Maloney**	2	0	2023	2023		
Germany	Michael Mason	5	0	1997	1997	U.S. citizen at birth. Born in West Germany	
Germany	Alfredo Morales	16	0	2013	2019	U.S. citizen at birth. Born in West Germany	
Germany	Horst Rick	1	0	1964	1964		
Germany	Willy Roy	20	9	1965	1973	Immigrated to the U.S. as a youth.	
Germany	Manfred Seissler	1	0	1973	1973		
Germany	Alex Skotarek	10	0	1975	1976	Immigrated to the U.S. as a youth.	
Germany	**Malik Tillman**	39	7	2022	2026	U.S. citizen at birth. He previously represented Germany at youth level	
Germany	**Timothy Tillman**	3	0	2024	2025	U.S. citizen at birth. He previously represented Germany at youth level	
Germany	David Wagner	8	0	1996	1998	U.S. citizen at birth. Born in West Germany. He previously represented Germany at youth level	
Germany	Danny Williams	23	2	2011	2017	U.S. citizen at birth. Born in West Germany. He previously represented Germany at youth level	
Germany	Mike Windischmann	50	0	1984	1990	Immigrated to the U.S. as a youth. Born in West Germany	
Germany	Andrew Wooten	1	0	2015	2015	U.S. citizen at birth. Born in West Germany	
Germany	David Yelldell	1	0	2011	2011	U.S. citizen at birth. Born in West Germany	
Ghana	Freddy Adu	17	2	2006	2011	Immigrated to the U.S. as a youth.	
Greece	George Athineos	1	1	1953	1953		
Greece	Frank Klopas	39	12	1987	1995	Immigrated to the U.S. as a youth.	
Greece	John Lignos	1	0	1982	1982	Immigrated to the U.S. as a youth.	
Haiti	Dave Cayemitte	1	0	1984	1984	Immigrated to the U.S. as a youth.	
Haiti	Ronil Dufrene	2	0	1991	1991	Immigrated to the U.S. as a youth.	
Haiti	Pat Fidelia	1	0	1979	1979	Immigrated to the U.S. as a youth.	
Haiti	Joe Gaetjens	3	1	1950	1950	Immigrated to the U.S. for college. He previously represented Haiti	
Haiti	Jacques LaDouceur	10	2	1984	1985	Immigrated to the U.S. as a youth.	
Hungary	Jim Benedek	4	0	1968	1968	Immigrated to the U.S. for college.	
Hungary	Andy Cziotka	4	0	1965	1965		
Hungary	Sandy Feher	2	0	1968	1968		
Hungary	Bob Gansler	5	0	1968	1968	Immigrated to the U.S. as a youth.	
Hungary	Charles Horvath	1	0	1964	1964		
Hungary	Andy Mate	1	0	1964	1964		
Hungary	Juli Veee	4	2	1976	1982	He previously represented Hungary at youth level	
Ireland	Cornelius Casey	4	1	1954	1954		
Ireland	Kenny Finn	2	0	1960	1961		
Ireland	Ed Kelly	2	0	1974	1974		
Israel	Ben Zinn	1	0	1959	1959	Born in Mandatory Palestine	
Israel	Abbie Wolanow	1	0	1961	1961		
Italy	Tony Crescitelli	1	0	1983	1983	Immigrated to the U.S. as a youth.	
Italy	Sergio Notarnicola	11	0	1953	1957		
Italy	**Emmanuel Sabbi**	1	0	2023	2023	Immigrated to the U.S. as a youth.	
Italy	Paul Scurti	1	0	1975	1975	Immigrated to the U.S. as a youth.	
Italy	Steve Sengelmann	1	0	1986	1986	Immigrated to the U.S. as a youth.	
Jamaica	Jeff Cunningham	14	1	2001	2010	Immigrated to the U.S. as a youth. He previously represented Jamaica	
Jamaica	Colin Fowles	18	0	1977	1980	Immigrated to the U.S. as a youth.	
Jamaica	Robin Fraser	27	0	1988	2001	Immigrated to the U.S. as a youth.	
Liberia	Doc Lawson	1	0	1979	1979	Immigrated to the U.S. as a youth.	
Liberia	Darlington Nagbe	25	1	2015	2018	Immigrated to the U.S. as a youth.	
Liberia	**Brooklyn Raines**	4	0	2026	2026	Immigrated to the U.S. as a youth.	
Martinique	David Regis	28	0	1998	2002	Born in a French overseas department	
Mexico	Martín Vásquez	7	0	1996	1997	Immigrated to the U.S. as a youth. He previously represented Mexico	
Mexico	William Yarbrough	3	0	2015	2016	U.S. citizen at birth.	
Mexico	**Alejandro Zendejas**	15	2	2023	2026	Immigrated to the U.S. as a youth. He previously represented Mexico.	
Montenegro	Sadri Gjonbalaj	5	1	1986	1993	Immigrated to the U.S. as a youth.	
Montenegro	Mirsad Huseinovic	1	0	1992	1992	Immigrated to the U.S. as a youth. Born in the SFR Yugoslavia	
Netherlands	**Sergiño Dest**	46	3	2019	2026	U.S. citizen at birth.	
Netherlands	Hank Liotart	4	0	1975	1975		
Netherlands	Earnie Stewart	101	17	1990	2004	U.S. citizen at birth.	
New Zealand	Tyler Boyd	10	2	2019	2019	U.S. citizen at birth. He previously represented New Zealand	
Nicaragua	Bayardo Abaunza	3	0	1965	1969		
Nigeria	**George Bello**	7	0	2021	2022	Immigrated to the U.S. as a youth.	
Nigeria	Ade Coker	5	3	1984	1984		
Nigeria	Jean Harbor	15	0	1992	1997	Immigrated to the U.S. for college.	
Nigeria	Ugo Ihemelu	2	0	2006	2009	Immigrated to the U.S. as a youth.	
North Macedonia	Ane Mihailovich	5	0	1977	1977	Born in the SFR Yugoslavia	
North Macedonia	George Nanchoff	10	1	1977	1979	Immigrated to the U.S. as a youth. Born in the SFR Yugoslavia	
North Macedonia	Louis Nanchoff	10	1	1979	1980	Immigrated to the U.S. as a youth. Born in the SFR Yugoslavia	
Northern Ireland	Dale Ervine	5	0	1985	1993	Immigrated to the U.S. as a youth.	
Northern Ireland	Cecil Moore	1	0	1953	1953	He previously represented Ireland	
Northern Ireland	Brian Quinn	48	1	1991	1994		
Norway	Mix Diskerud	38	6	2010	2016	U.S. citizen at birth. He previously represented Norway at youth level	
Norway	Werner Nilsen	2	0	1934	1934		
Peru	Jorge Benitez	2	0	1972	1972		
Peru	Carlos Bustamente	1	0	1961	1961		
Peru	Richard Green	1	0	1973	1973		
Peru	Carlos Jaguande	2	0	1992	1992	Immigrated to the U.S. as a youth.	
Peru	George Pastor	7	0	1988	1989		
Poland	Dietrich Albrecht	9	2	1968	1969	Born during World War II in an area of Poland annexed by Nazi Germany.	
Poland	Janusz Michallik	44	1	1991	1994		
Poland	Jerry Panek	3	0	1973	1973		
Poland	Andy Racz	1	0	1964	1964		
Poland	Zenon Snylyk	5	0	1957	1961	Immigrated to the U.S. as a youth.	
Poland	Stefan Szefer	3	0	1973	1973	He previously represented Poland	
Poland	Adam Wolanin	1	0	1950	1950	Born in Ukraine when it was part of Poland	
Portugal	Altino Domingues	4	0	1976	1976	Immigrated to the U.S. as a youth.	
Portugal	Fred Pereira	6	1	1977	1977	Immigrated to the U.S. as a youth.	
Portugal	Telmo Pires	1	0	1975	1975	Immigrated to the U.S. as a youth.	
Romania	Adolph Bachmeier	15	0	1959	1969		
Romania	Erhardt Kapp	5	1	1983	1985	Immigrated to the U.S. as a youth.	
Scotland	Andy Auld	5	2	1926	1930		
Scotland	Barney Battles Jr.	1	0	1925	1925	He switched to Scotland	
Scotland	Jim Brown	4	1	1930	1930		
Scotland	Gordon Burness	1	0	1926	1926	He previously represented Canada	
Scotland	Bill Carnihan	2	0	1925	1926		
Scotland	Willie Carson	1	0	1959	1959		
Scotland	Walter Dick	1	0	1934	1934		
Scotland	Neil Clarke	2	0	1916	1916		
Scotland	Doug Farquhar	1	0	1959	1959		
Scotland	Jock Ferguson	1	0	1925	1925		
Scotland	Thomson Ferrans	3	0	1937	1937	Immigrated to the U.S. as a youth.	
Scotland	William Findlay	4	0	1924	1928	Immigrated to the U.S. as a youth.	
Scotland	Jimmy Gallagher	5	1	1928	1934	Immigrated to the U.S. as a youth.	
Scotland	Malcolm Goldie	1	0	1925	1925		
Scotland	Willie Herd	1	0	1925	1925		
Scotland	Stuart Holden	25	3	2008	2013	Immigrated to the U.S. as a youth.	
Scotland	Jack Hynes	4	0	1949	1949	Immigrated to the U.S. as a youth.	
Scotland	Findlay Kerr	1	0	1926	1926		
Scotland	Dominic Kinnear	54	9	1990	1993	Immigrated to the U.S. as a youth.	
Scotland	Jack Lyons	2	0	1928	1928		
Scotland	Jack Marshall	1	1	1926	1926	He previously represented Scotland	
Scotland	John Mason	1	0	1977	1977	Immigrated to the U.S. as a youth.	
Scotland	Charlie McCully	11	0	1973	1975		
Scotland	Henry McCully	2	1	1975	1975		
Scotland	Tommy McFarlane	1	0	1925	1925		
Scotland	Bart McGhee	3	1	1930	1930	Immigrated to the U.S. as a youth.	
Scotland	Johnny McGuire	1	0	1925	1925		
Scotland	Ed McIlvenny	3	0	1950	1950		
Scotland	Willie McLean	2	0	1934	1934		
Scotland	Doug McMillan	2	0	1974	1974		
Scotland	Peter Millar	13	9	1968	1972		
Scotland	Robert Millar	2	0	1925	1925		
Scotland	Roy Milne	1	0	1953	1953		
Scotland	Johnny Moore	11	0	1972	1975	Immigrated to the U.S. as a youth.	
Scotland	Billy Morris	1	0	1926	1926		
Scotland	Ed Murphy	18	5	1955	1969		
Scotland	Tommy O'Hara	1	0	1982	1982		
Scotland	George O'Neill	2	0	1973	1973		
Scotland	David Robertson	1	0	1925	1925		
Scotland	Edmund Smith	1	0	1926	1926		
Scotland	Derek Spalding	1	0	1982	1982		
Scotland	Archie Stark	2	5	1925	1925	Immigrated to the U.S. as a youth.	
Scotland	Tommy Stark	1	0	1925	1925	Immigrated to the U.S. as a youth.	
Scotland	Tommy Steel	1	0	1925	1925		
Scotland	Andy Straden	4	3	1924	1924		
Scotland	Doug Wark	1	0	1975	1975	Immigrated to the U.S. as a youth.	
Scotland	Alexander Wood	4	0	1930	1930	Immigrated to the U.S. as a youth.	
Serbia	Rudy Getzinger	8	1	1972	1973	Immigrated to the U.S. as a youth.	
Serbia	Ilija Mitic	1	0	1973	1973	Born in the Kingdom of Yugoslavia	
Serbia	Preki	28	4	1996	2001	Born in the SFR Yugoslavia	
Serbia	Steve Ralbovsky	15	0	1976	1978	Immigrated to the U.S. as a youth. Born in the SFR Yugoslavia	
Serbia	Scoop Stanisic	1	0	1993	1993	Born in the SFR Yugoslavia	
Slovenia	Werner Roth	15	0	1972	1975	Immigrated to the U.S. as a youth. Born in the SFR Yugoslavia	
South Africa	Andrew Parkinson	2	0	1984	1984		
South Africa	John Thorrington	4	0	2001	2008	Immigrated to the U.S. as a youth.	
South Africa	Roy Wegerle	41	7	1992	1998	Immigrated to the U.S. for college.	
Spain	Santiago Formoso	7	0	1976	1977	Immigrated to the U.S. as a youth.	
Spain	Manuel Hernandez	2	0	1974	1974	Immigrated to the U.S. as a youth.	
Spain	Alfonso Marina	1	0	1955	1955	Immigrated to the U.S. as a youth.	
Sweden	Carl Johnson	2	0	1924	1924		
Switzerland	Jeff Agoos	134	4	1988	2003	U.S. citizen at birth.	
Tanzania	**Bernard Kamungo**	1	0	2024	2024		
Togo	Gale Agbossoumonde	1	0	2010	2010	Immigrated to the U.S. as a youth.	
Trinidad and Tobago	Hayden Knight	3	0	1984	1984	Immigrated to the U.S. as a youth.	
Turkey	Dave Coskunian	3	0	1973	1974		
Ukraine	Walter Chyzowych	3	0	1964	1965	Immigrated to the U.S. as a youth. Born in Ukraine when it was part of Poland	
Ukraine	Nick Krat	14	0	1968	1972	Immigrated to the U.S. as a youth. Born in Ukraine when it was part of Nazi Germany	
Uruguay	Fernando Clavijo	61	0	1990	1994		
Uruguay	Tab Ramos	81	8	1988	2000	Immigrated to the U.S. as a youth.	
Wales	Bert Evans	1	0	1959	1959		

== Gallery ==
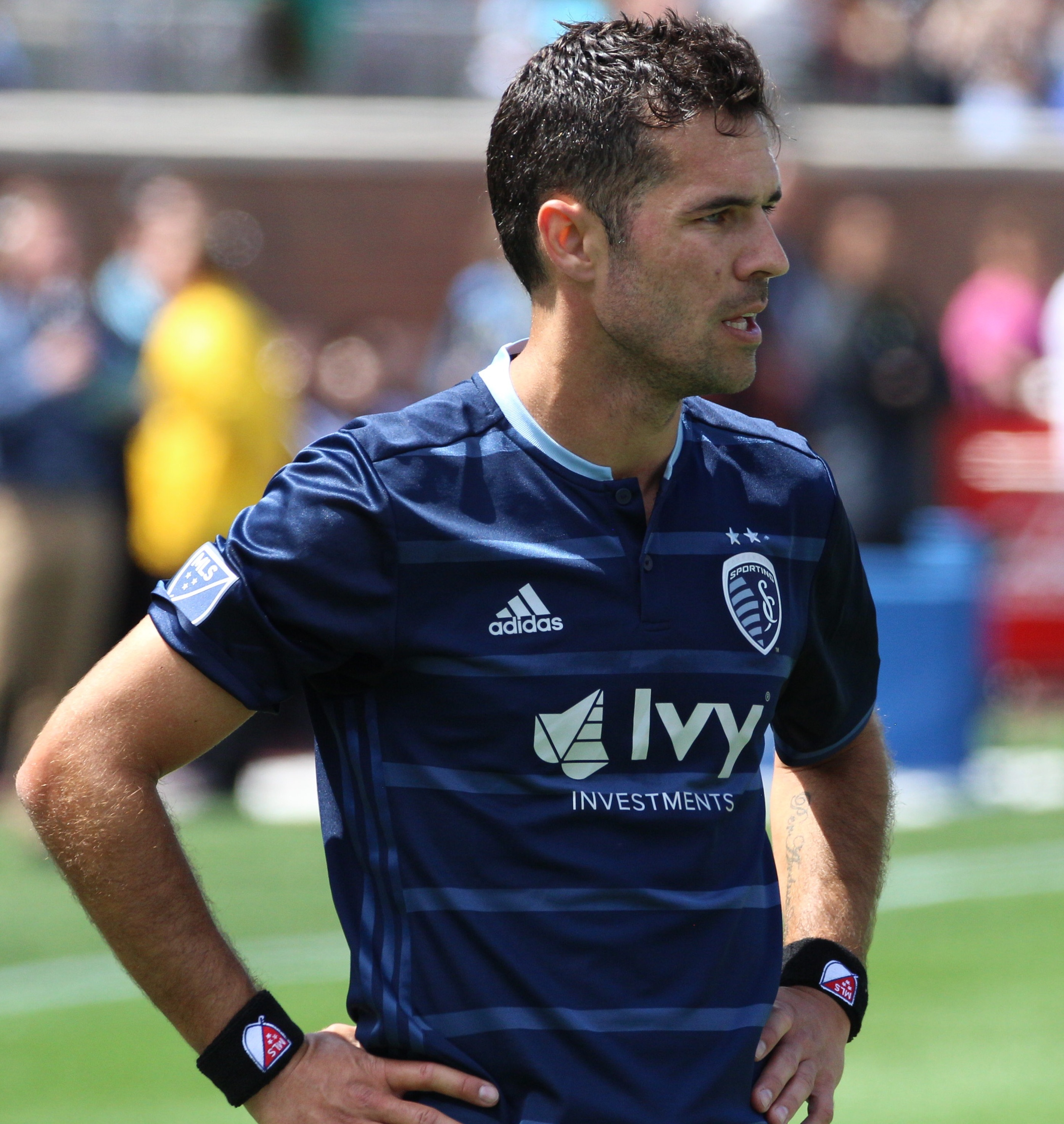
Benny Feilhaber

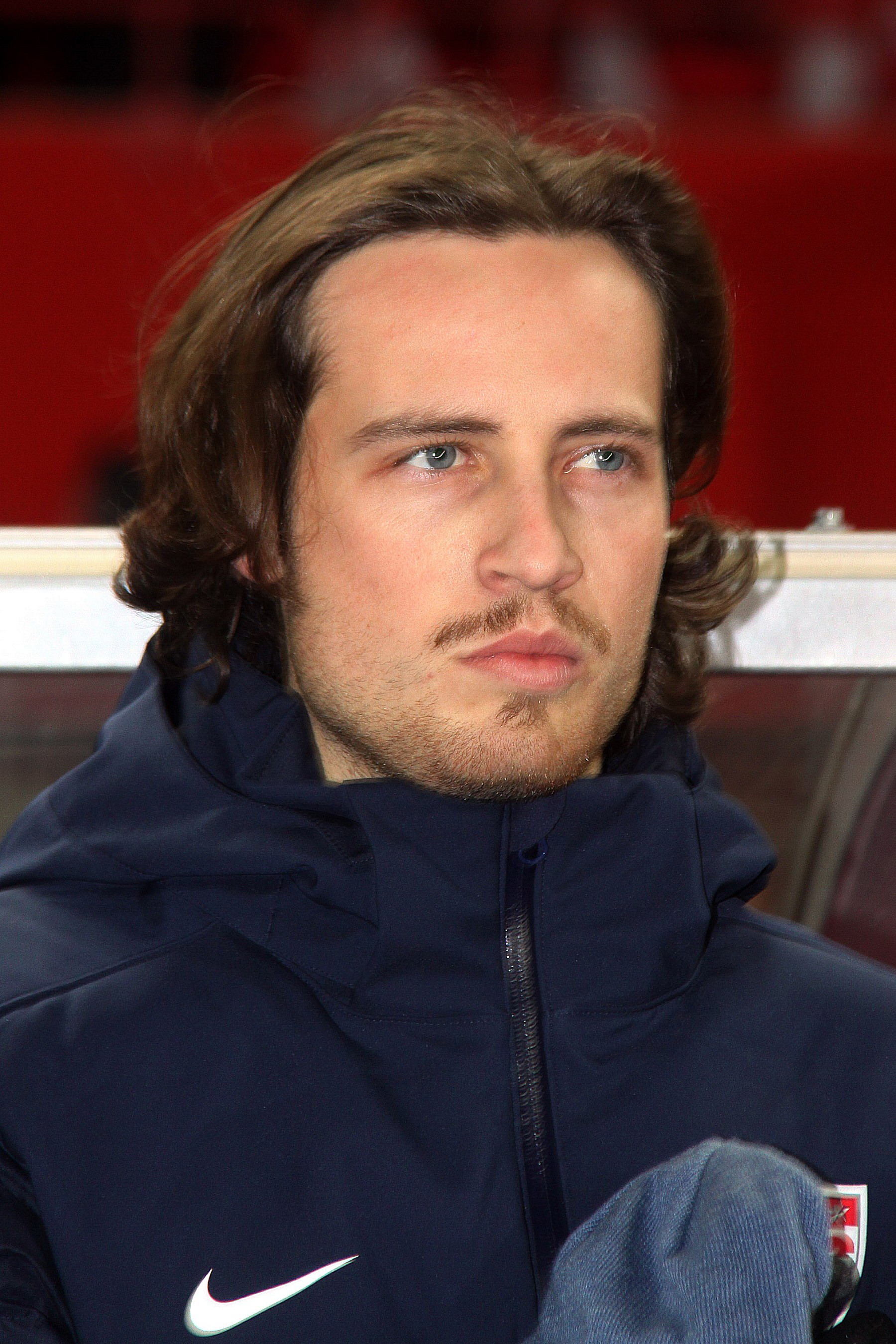
Mix Diskerud

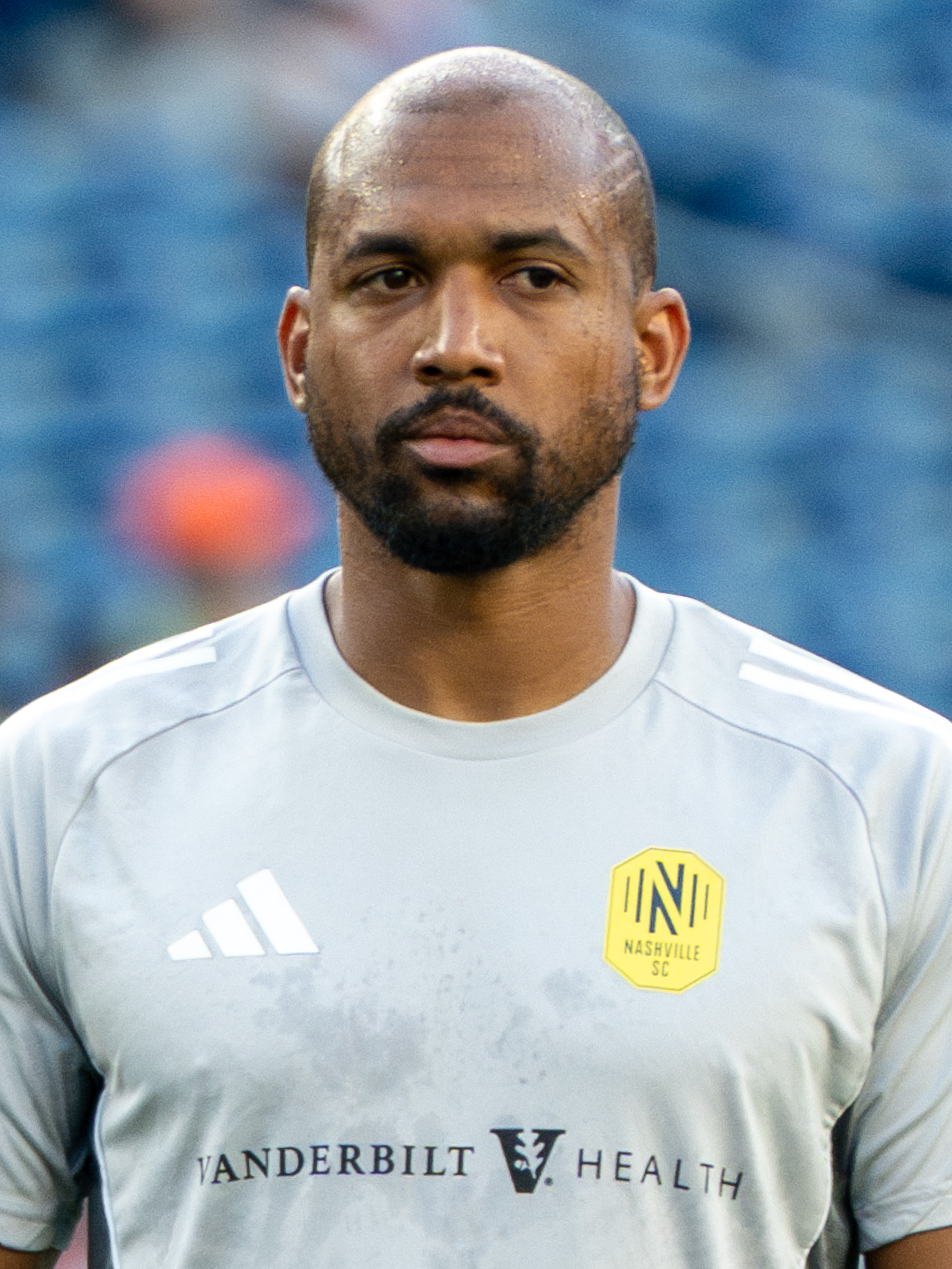
Teal Bunbury

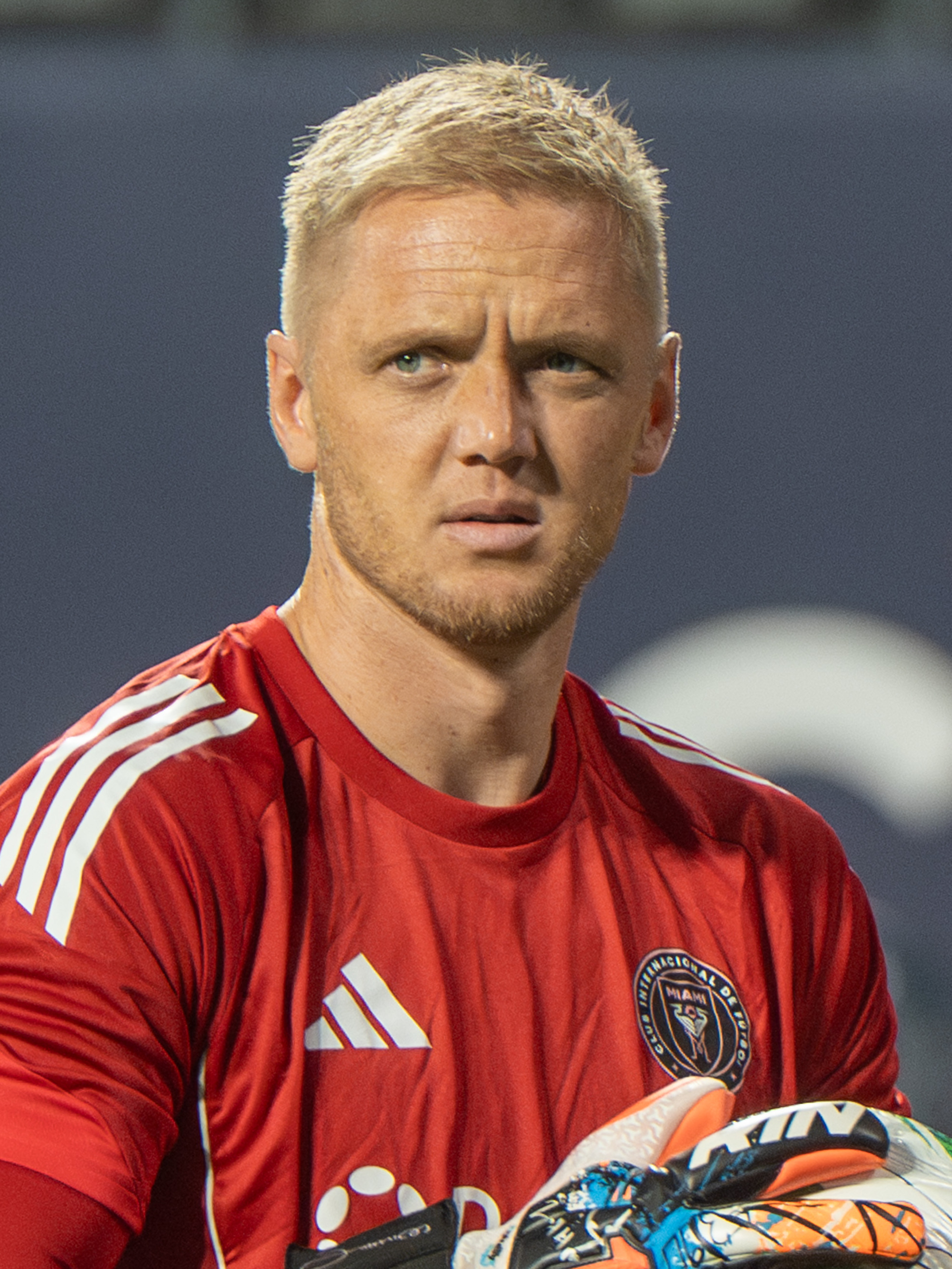
William Yarbrough

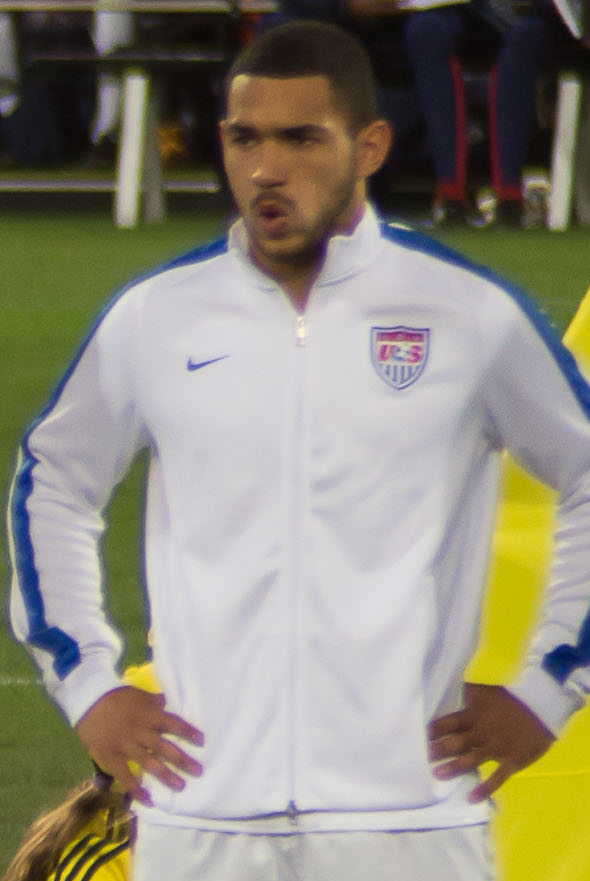
Cameron Carter-Vickers

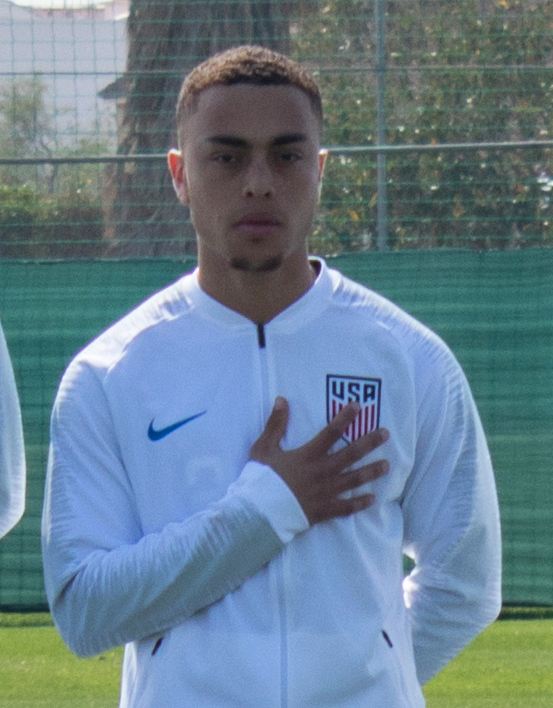
Sergiño Dest

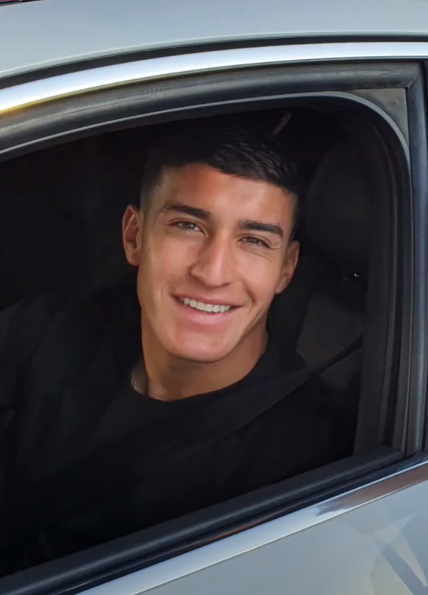
Alejandro Zendejas

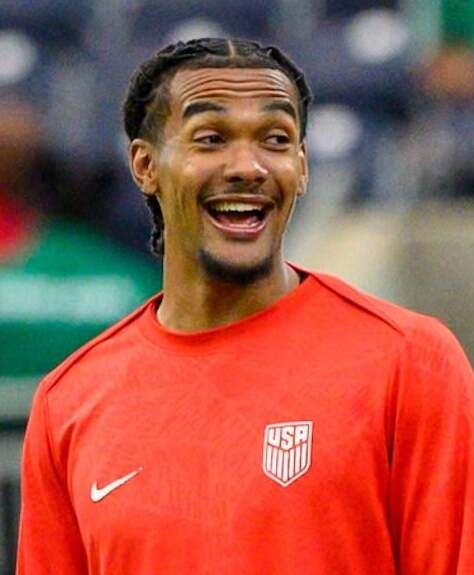
Damion Downs

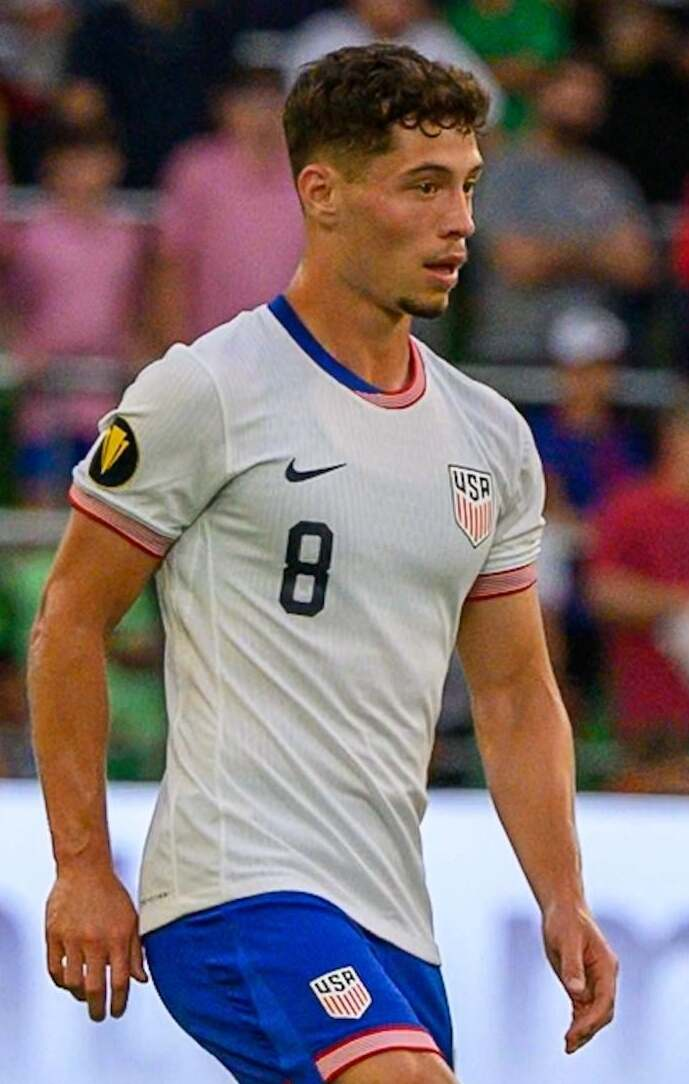
Sebastian Berhalter

== Number of United States men's national soccer team born in each foreign country ==
Country	Players
Scotland	47
Germany	28
England	26
Argentina	9
Hungary	7
Poland	6
Brazil	5
Colombia	5
Croatia	5
Haiti	5
Peru	5
Serbia	5
Austria	4
Canada	4
Italy	4
Nigeria	4
Costa Rica	2
Greece	3
Ireland	3
Jamaica	3
Liberia	3
Mexico	3
Netherlands	3
North Macedonia	3
Northern Ireland	3
South Africa	3
Portugal	3
Ukraine	3
Belgium	2
Bolivia	2
Cape Verde	2
China	2
Denmark	2
El Salvador	2
France	2
Israel	2
Montenegro	2
Norway	2
Romania	2
Spain	2
Uruguay	2
Bermuda	1
Bosnia and Herzegovina	1
Cameroon	1
Czech Republic	1
Ecuador	1
Egypt	1
Ghana	1
Martinique	1
New Zealand	1
Nicaragua	1
Slovenia	1
Sweden	1
Switzerland	1
Tanzania	1
Togo	1
Trinidad and Tobago	1
Turkey	1
Wales	1

== See also ==
- List of United States men's international soccer players
- List of United States men's national soccer team dual nationals
- United States youth national soccer team
- United States Soccer Federation
- Major League Soccer
- United States soccer league system
- Soccer in the United States
