= Albert Evans =

Albert Evans may refer to:

- Albert Evans (American football) (born 1989), American football safety
- Albert Evans (dancer) (1968–2015), American ballet dancer
- Albert Evans (footballer, born 1874) (1874–1966), footballer for Aston Villa, manager of Coventry City
- Albert Evans (footballer, born 1901) (1901–1969), footballer for Woking, Tottenham Hotspur and Grantham Town
- Albert Evans (politician) (1903–1988), British Labour Party politician
- Albert Evans (Welsh footballer), footballer for Cardiff City
- Albert S. Evans (died 1872), American explorer and writer
- Albert Evans (bowls) (1902–1977), Welsh bowls player

== See also ==
- Bert Evans (disambiguation)
- Al Evans (1916–1979), baseball player
