= List of United States men's national soccer team dual nationals =

Soccer player eligible to play for the United States and other countries

This article provides a comprehensive list of soccer players who are or were eligible to represent the United States men’s national soccer team (USMNT) in international competitions, in accordance with the FIFA eligibility rules.

The USMNT, governed by the United States Soccer Federation, represents the United States in international soccer, including official matches sanctioned by FIFA and CONCACAF, such as the FIFA World Cup and its qualifiers, continental championships, and international friendlies.

This list is inclusive of all players meeting any of these criteria, irrespective of their country of birth.

== Players who are eligible or provisionally cap-tied ==
The following list includes players who remain eligible to represent the United States men’s national soccer team (USMNT) or another national team under FIFA's eligibility rules and haven't been cap-tied by any national team.

A player who has represented one association in an official competition at the youth level becomes provisionally cap-tied, meaning they must file a one-time switch to represent another national team if they meet the necessary eligibility requirements. However, participation in senior national team friendlies does not permanently cap-tie a player, allowing them to change national allegiance later if eligible.

Players listed below may qualify for the United States through birthright citizenship, parental heritage, or naturalization, while others may be eligible to represent multiple nations due to dual nationality laws. Their inclusion on this list reflects ongoing interest from U.S. Soccer, media analysts, or the players themselves regarding potential future involvement with the USMNT.

The list also indicates whether each player is provisionally cap-tied or remains completely uncap-tied, as this status affects their ability to file a one-time switch or represent the United States in competitive international matches.

Name of the player	Date of birth	Place of birth	Reason for the eligibility to the USMNT	Other countries they're eligible to play for	Provisionally cap-tied?	References
Brandon Austin	January 8, 1999	Hemel Hempstead	Born to an American parent	England, US Virgin Islands	No	
Brandon Cambridge	February 9, 2002	New York City	Born in the United States	Canada, South Africa	No	
Alex Mighten	April 11, 2002	West Hartford, CT	Born in the United States	England	No	
Declan Frith	May 16, 2002	London	Born to an American grandparent	England, Jamaica	No	
Chituru Odunze	October 14, 2002	Raleigh, NC	Born in the United States	Canada, England, Nigeria	Yes, to the United States	
Bryan Okoh	May 16, 2003	Houston	Born in the United States	Switzerland, Nigeria	Yes, to Switzerland	
Jonathan Gomez	September 1, 2003	North Richland Hills, TX	Born in the United States	Mexico	Yes, to the United States	
Anrie Chase	March 24, 2004	Yokosuka	Born to an American parent	Japan, Jamaica	Yes, to Japan	
Gabriel Slonina	May 15, 2004	Addison, IL	Born in the United States	Poland	Yes, to the United States	
Malick Sanogo	June 30, 2004	New York City	Born in the United States	Germany, Ivory Coast	Yes, to the United States	
Rokas Pukštas	August 25, 2004	Stillwater, OK	Born in the United States	Lithuania	Yes, to the United States	
Ken Aboh	November 9, 2004	Unknown	Born to an American parent	England, Nigeria	No	
Leo Duru	January 12, 2005	Manchester	Born to an American parent	England, Nigeria	Yes, to the United States	
Benjamin Cremaschi	March 2, 2005	Miami	Born in the United States	Argentina	Yes, to the United States	
Bora Aydinlik	May 9, 2005	Miami Beach	Born in the United States	Turkey	No	
Kristian Fletcher	August 6, 2005	Bowie, MD	Born in the United States	Scotland	Yes, to the United States	
Adrian Gill	January 3, 2006	Denver	Born in the United States	Spain	Yes, to the United States	
Fidel Barajas	April 5, 2006	Sacramento	Born in the United States	Mexico	Yes, to Mexico	
Dino Klapija	January 5, 2007	North Hempstead, NY	Born in the United States	Croatia, Bosnia and Herzegovina, Kosovo, Albania	No	
Christian McFarlane	January 25, 2007	Basildon	Immigrated to the United States and naturalized	England, Jamaica	Yes to England	
Xanti Oyharçabal	February 15, 2007	Bayonne	Born to an American parent	France, Colombia	No	
Tyler Meiser	March 1, 2007	Unknown	Born to an American parent	Germany	No	
Noel Buck	April 5, 2007	Arlington, MA	Born in the United States	England, Wales	Yes, to England	
Marvin Dills	April 25, 2007	Frankfurt	Born to an American parent	Germany	No	
Zane Okoro	May 7, 2007	Norwalk, CT	Born in the United States	England, Nigeria	No	
Jykese Fields	June 14, 2007	Minot, ND	Born in the United States	Germany	Yes, to Germany	
Montrell Culbreath	August 29, 2007	Bruchmühlbach-Miesau	Born to an American parent	Germany	Yes, to Germany	
Luka Bentt	October 1, 2007	Washington, D.C.	Born to an American parent	Belgium, England	No	
Liam West	December 14, 2007	Unknown	Born to an American parent	Norway	Yes, to Norway	
Asher Artz	January 14, 2008	Unknown	Either born in the United States or born to an American parent	Germany	No	
Landon Emenalo	January 18, 2008	Tucson	Born in the United States	England, Nigeria	Yes, to England	
William Lodmell	February 5, 2008	Mexico City	Born to an American parent	Senegal, Mexico	No	
Máximo Carrizo	February 28, 2008	New York City	Born in the United States	Argentina	Yes, to the United States	
Austyn Jones	April 16, 2008	Houten	Born to an American parent	Netherlands	No	
Wes Okoduwa	May 12, 2008	New York City	Born in the United States	England, Nigeria	Yes, to England	
Alexander Staff	June 12, 2008	Dieburg	Born to an American grandparent	Germany	Yes, to Germany	
Philipp Kovalchuk	February 7, 2009	Atlanta	Born in the United States	Russia	No	
Manu Romero	April 9, 2009	Raleigh	Born in the United States	Uruguay	No	
Xander Newstead	April 23, 2009	San Francisco	Born in the United States	Philippines	No	
Leonard Prescott	September 23, 2009	New York City	Born in the United States	Germany	No	
Da'vian Kimbrough	February 18, 2010	Woodland, CA	Born in the United States	Mexico	No	

== Players who are or were permanently cap-tied to the United States ==
The following list comprises players who are permanently cap-tied to the United States. Under FIFA regulations, a player becomes permanently tied to a national association after appearing in an official competitive senior international match, such as FIFA World Cup qualifiers, continental championship qualifiers, or major tournament finals, or after a one-time switch. Once the player is cap-tied, the player is no longer eligible to represent another national team, regardless of dual nationality or previous eligibility pathways.

This list also includes players who were cap-tied prior to retirement, acknowledging their permanent association with the USMNT even after concluding their professional or international careers.

Name of the player	Date of birth	Place of birth	Reason for the eligibility to the USMNT	Other countries they were eligible to play for	References
Thomas Dooley	May 12, 1961	Bechhofen	Born to an American parent	Germany	
Earnie Stewart	March 28, 1969	Veghel	Born to an American parent	Netherlands	
Jermaine Jones	November 3, 1981	Frankfurt	Born to an American parent	Germany	
Fabian Johnson	December 11, 1987	Munich	Born to an American parent	Germany	
Freddy Adu	June 2, 1989	Tema	Immigrated to the United States and naturalized	Ghana	
Timothy Chandler	March 29, 1990	Frankfurt	Born to an American parent	Germany	
Mix Diskerud	October 2, 1990	Oslo	Born to an American parent	Norway	
Aron Johannsson	November 10, 1990	Mobile, AL	Born in the United States	Iceland	
Terrence Boyd	February 16, 1991	Bremen	Born to an American parent	Germany	
John Brooks	January 28, 1993	Berlin	Born to an American parent	Germany	
Tyler Boyd	December 30, 1994	Tauranga	Born to an American parent	New Zealand	
Julian Green	June 6, 1995	Tampa	Born in the United States	Germany	
Jordan Pefok	April 26, 1996	Washington, D.C.	Born in the United States	France, Cameroon	
Gedion Zelalem	January 26, 1997	Berlin	Immigrated to the United States and naturalized	Ethiopia, Germany	
Antonee Robinson	August 8, 1997	Milton Keynes	Born to an American parent	England	
Cameron Carter-Vickers	December 31, 1997	Southend-on-Sea	Born to an American parent	England	
Alejandro Zendejas	February 7, 1998	Ciudad Juárez	Immigrated to the United States and naturalized	Mexico	
Brandon Vázquez	October 14, 1998	Chula Vista, CA	Born in the United States	Mexico	
Lennard Maloney	October 8, 1999	Berlin	Born to an American parent	Germany	
Timothy Weah	February 22, 2000	New York City	Born in the United States	France, Jamaica, Liberia	
Sergiño Dest	November 3, 2000	Almere	Born to an American parent	Netherlands	
Jesús Ferreira	December 24, 2000	Santa Marta	Immigrated to the United States and naturalized	Colombia	
Sebastian Berhalter	May 10, 2001	London	Born to an American parent	England, Republic of Ireland, Puerto Rico	
Folarin Balogun	July 3, 2001	New York City	Born in the United States	England, Nigeria	
Johnny Cardoso	September 20, 2001	Denville, NJ	Born in the United States	Brazil	
Kristoffer Lund	May 14, 2002	Kerteminde	Born to an American parent	Denmark	
Malik Tillman	May 28, 2002	Nuremberg	Born to an American parent	Germany	
Yunus Musah	November 29, 2002	New York City	Born in the United States	England, Italy, Ghana	
Ricardo Pepi	January 9, 2003	El Paso	Born in the United States	Mexico	
Diego Luna	September 7, 2003	Sunnyvale, CA	Born in the United States	Mexico	
Damion Downs	July 6, 2004	Werneck	Born to an American parent	Germany	
Cole Campbell	February 20, 2006	Houston	Born in the United States	Iceland	
Diego Kochen	March 19, 2006	Miami	Born in the United States	Peru, Venezuela	
Justin Ellis	May 14, 2007	Wellington, FL	Born in the United States	Uruguay	
Julian Hall	March 24, 2008	New York City	Born in the United States	Albania	
Adri Mehmeti	April 6, 2009	New York City	Born in the United States	Poland	
Mathis Albert	May 21, 2009	Greenville, SC	Born in the United States	Germany, France	

== Players who are or were permanently cap-tied to other countries ==
The following list includes players who, despite being eligible at some point to represent the United States, ultimately became permanently cap-tied to another national team.

Some may have previously appeared for U.S. youth teams or participated in U.S. Soccer training camps, but once they became cap-tied another nation, their international allegiance became permanently fixed.

Name of the player	Date of birth	Place of birth	Reason they were eligible to the USMNT	Country they chose to play for	Other countries they were eligible to play for	References
Giuseppe Rossi	February 1, 1987	Teaneck, NJ	Born in the United States	Italy		
Neven Subotić	December 10, 1988	Banja Luka	Immigrated to the United States and naturalized	Serbia	Bosnia and Herzegovina	
Fafà Picault	February 23, 1991	New York City	Born in the United States	Haiti		
Thomas Delaney	September 3, 1991	Frederiksberg	Born to an American grandparent	Denmark		
Danny Musovski	November 30, 1995	Henderson, NV	Born in the United States	North Macedonia		
Rubio Rubin	March 1, 1996	Beaverton, OR	Born in the United States	Guatemala		
Aaron Herrera	June 6, 1997	Las Cruces, NM	Born in the United States	Guatemala		
Julian Ryerson	November 17, 1997	Lyngdal	Born to an American parent	Norway		
Trent Alexander-Arnold	October 7, 1998	Liverpool	Born to an American grandparent	England		
Faris Abdi	May 9, 1999	San Diego	Born in the United States	Saudi Arabia		
Jens Cajuste	August 10, 1999	Gothenburg	Born to an American parent	Sweden	Haiti	
Jonathan David	January 14, 2000	New York City	Born in the United States	Canada	Haiti	
Ayo Akinola	January 20, 2000	Detroit	Born in the United States	Canada		
CJ dos Santos	August 24, 2000	Philadelphia	Born in the United States	Cape Verde	Portugal	
Richard Ledezma	September 6, 2000	Phoenix	Born in the United States	Mexico		
David Ochoa	January 16, 2001	Oxnard, CA	Born in the United States	Mexico		
Mo Abualnadi	February 8, 2001	Overland Park, KS	Born in the United States	Jordan	Palestine	
Julián Araujo	August 13, 2001	Lompoc, CA	Born in the United States	Mexico		
Amir Richardson	January 24, 2002	Nice	Born to an American parent	Morocco	France	
Efraín Alvárez	June 19, 2002	Los Angeles	Born in the United States	Mexico		
Zion Suzuki	August 21, 2002	Little Rock	Born in the United States	Japan	Ghana	
Nathaniel Brown	June 16, 2003	Amberg	Born to an American parent	Germany		
Brian Gutiérrez	June 17, 2003	Berwyn, IL	Born in the United States	Mexico		
David Ruiz	February 8, 2004	Miami	Born in the United States	Honduras		
Noah Allen	April 28, 2004	Pembroke Pines, FL	Born in the United States	Greece		
Luca Koleosho	September 15, 2004	Norwalk, CT	Born in the United States	Italy	Canada, Nigeria	
Mansour Ouro-Tagba	December 17, 2004	New York City	Born in the United States	Togo	Germany	
Esmir Bajraktarević	March 10, 2005	Appleton, WI	Born in the United States	Bosnia and Herzegovina		
Obed Vargas	August 5, 2005	Anchorage	Born in the United States	Mexico		
Keyrol Figueroa	August 31, 2006	Tegucigalpa	Immigrated to the United States and naturalized	Honduras	England	
Noahkai Banks	December 1, 2006	Honolulu	Born in the United States	Germany		

== See also ==
- List of United States men's international soccer players
- List of United States men's international soccer players born outside the United States
- United States youth national soccer team
- United States Soccer Federation
- Major League Soccer
- United States soccer league system
- Soccer in the United States
