= Bert Evans (disambiguation) =

Bert Evans (1922–2008) was a soccer (football) player,

Bert or Bertram Evans may also refer to:

- Bertram Evans (1872–1919), cricketer

== Fictional ==
- Bert Evans, character played by Pat Conway
- Bertram Evans, character in House of Secrets (1936 film)

== See also ==
- Albert Evans (disambiguation)
- Robert Evans (disambiguation)
- Hubert Evans (disambiguation)
- Herbert Evans (disambiguation)
