= Manuel Romero =

Manuel Romero may refer to:

- Manuel Romero Rubio (1828-1895), Mexican politician
- Manuel Romero (director) (1891-1954), Argentine film director
- Manuel Romero (footballer) (born 1950), Spanish footballer
- Manu Romero (born 2009), American soccer player
