= Hubert Evans =

Hubert Evans may refer to:

- Hubert Evans (author), Canadian writer
  - Hubert Evans Non-Fiction Prize
- Hubert Evans or Hugh Evans (basketball) (1941–2022), American basketball referee
- Hubert Roy Evans or Roy Evans, Welsh civil engineer and academic
- Bert Evans, footballer

== See also ==
- Bert Evans (disambiguation)
