= Liverpool Empire Theatre =

Theatre in Liverpool, England

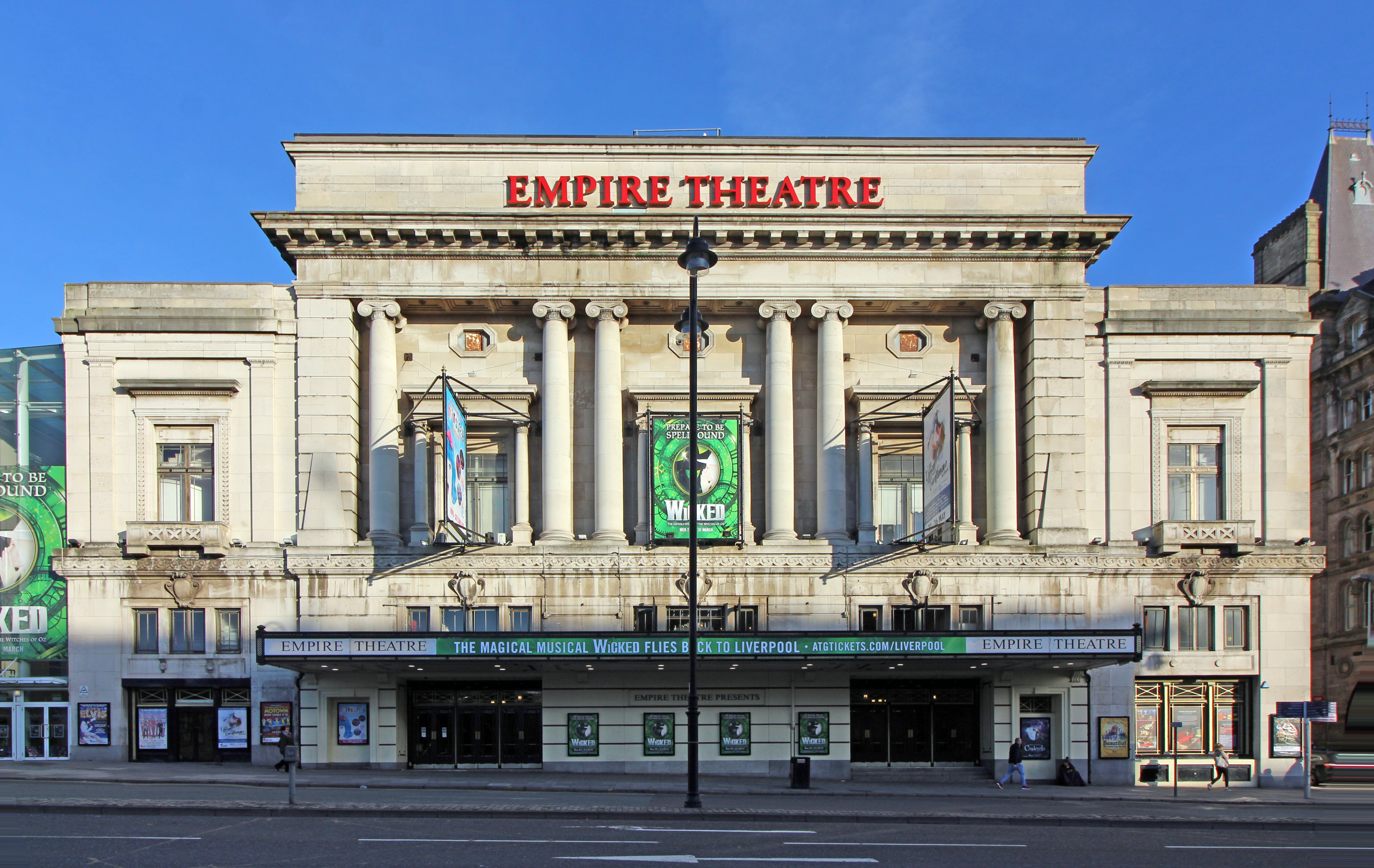
- The Empire Theatre in 2018

- Location within Merseyside

General information
- Type: Theatre
- Architectural style: Neoclassical
- Location: Lime Street, Liverpool, England
- Coordinates: 53.4089°N 2.9781°W
- Groundbreaking: 1924
- Completed: 1925
- Opened: 9 March 1925
- Renovated: 1977, 1999
- Client: Moss Empires
- Owner: ATG Entertainment

Technical details
- Structural system: Steel frame

Design and construction
- Architecture firm: W. and T. R. Milburn

Other information
- Seating capacity: 2,348

Website
- Official Website

The Liverpool Empire Theatre is a theatre on the corner of Lime Street in Liverpool, England. The playhouse, which opened in 1925, is the second one to be built on the site. It has the largest two-tier auditorium in the United Kingdom and can seat 2,348 people.

== History ==
The site's first theatre, which at that time was Liverpool's largest, was named the "New Prince of Wales Theatre and Opera House" opened on 15 October 1866. On 29 July 1867 its name was changed to the "Royal Alexandra Theatre and Opera House" in honour of Princess Alexandra, Princess of Wales. In 1894, the playhouse closed but was re-opened the following year under the ownership of Empire Theatre (Liverpool) Ltd. In 1896 the theatre was sold to Messrs. Moss and Thornton for £30,000 (equivalent to £3,450,000 in 2025), and renamed "The Empire". It closed for the final time on 16 February 1924, and was demolished.

The current Liverpool Empire Theatre opened on 9 March 1925. In 1977 the theatre was still owned by Moss Empires, who were making plans to dispose of it. Two years later it was acquired by Merseyside County Council. During the following two years a total of £680,000 was spent on improving the back stage facilities, and extending the stage and orchestra pit. The theatre underwent a further major refurbishment in 1999; this included increasing the size of the stage and improving the facilities for the audience. By 2002 the theatre was owned by Clear Channel Entertainment. In that year an extension was built on the north side of the building.

== Architecture ==
=== Exterior ===
The theatre was designed by W. and T. R. Milburn for Moss Empires; the carving and the ornamentation in the auditorium were carried out by E. O. Griffiths. The building is constructed on a steel frame, with a Portland stone façade and brick elsewhere. The architectural style of the façade is free Neoclassical. The front of the theatre is in five bays, the central three of which have an attic rising above the two lateral bays. The ground floor of the central bays contains the entrance doors and over them is a steel canopy decorated with medallions and guilloché bands. The storey above ground level contains the balcony, with single and paired Ionic columns, between which are recessed windows. Over this is a dentilled cornice and the attic. In the first floor of the side bays there are windows in architraves that are flanked by shallow pilasters above which is a plain parapet.

=== Interior ===
The entrance foyer is on the ground level, with stairs to the balcony on both sides of the foyer. The seats are raked both to the sides and to the rear in order to improve the lines of sight. The internal decoration is in Louis XVI style. It contains "many curious decorative features including carved elephant caryatids".

=== Conservation ===
The theatre was listed in the National Heritage List for England as a Grade II listed building on 16 October 1990. When it was opened its design was considered advanced, owing to the raked seating layout. There are 2,350 seats, Britain's largest two-tier auditorium. It is sited in the William Brown Street Conservation Area.

=== Past performances ===
Performers in the original theatre included George Formby Sr., Harry Tate, Dan Leno, Florrie Forde, The Two Bobs, and Wilson, Keppel and Betty. The first production in the present theatre was Better Days, starring Stanley Lupino, Maisie Gay and Ruth French. Subsequent performers have included Fred Astaire and his sister Adele Astaire, Frank Sinatra, Judy Garland, Bing Crosby, Mae West, Laurel and Hardy, Roy Rogers and Trigger, Charlton Heston, Sarah Bernhardt, Henry Irving, Vesta Tilley, and Arthur Askey.

In 1957, a local pop group called The Quarrymen appeared at the theatre. They returned in 1959, having changed their name to "Johnny and the Moondogs". They returned to the Empire again in 1962, now named The Beatles. The Beatles played the Empire for the last time on 5 December 1965.

The Rolling Stones performed at the Empire Theatre with Ike & Tina Turner and The Yardbirds on 25 September 1966.

During the 1970s, two Royal Command Performances were held in the Empire, and in 2007 the theatre was the venue for the Royal Variety Performance in recognition of Liverpool being made the European Capital of Culture the following year.

Singers and musicians who performed at the venue include Johnny Mathis, The Carpenters, Neil Sedaka, The Osmonds, Tommy Steel, Adam Faith, Bruce Forsyth, Victoria Wood, Morecambe and Wise, Ken Dodd, Shirley Bassey, Roy Orbison, Del Shannon, Freddy Cannon, OMD, Kylie Minogue, Kate Bush, Elton John, Cilla Black, AC/DC, Aerosmith, Chuck Berry, Led Zeppelin, Black Sabbath, Lynyrd Skynyrd, Rush, Wishbone Ash, The Police, Queen, Santana, Iron Maiden, Genesis, Steve Hillage, Steve Harley and Cockney Rebel (the band's 1976 concert at the theatre was frequently alluded to by Steve Harley when he played concerts in the North of England, since, during the extended instrumental in his song 'Death Trip' (track 10 of 1973's 'The Human Menagerie' album), he fell off the stage and into the orchestra pit, but continued performing as though nothing had happened, despite breaking 3 ribs and as a result having to cancel the rest of the tour).

== Present day ==
The Empire Theatre continues to stage productions in various genres, including musicals, pop concerts, comedians, plays, opera, and wrestling. The theatre is reputed to be haunted by at least two ghosts, one a former painter at the theatre called Len, the other a girl aged about nine or ten in Victorian dress. As of 2011 the Empire is part of the Ambassador Theatre Group (ATG).

Each year a musical is produced at the theatre performed by participants in Stage Experience, a two-week summer school in which local youngsters take part in performing a full-scale musical with a professional team. This began in 2007 with Summer Holiday, followed by The Wiz in 2008, Bugsy Malone in 2009, Fame in 2010, West Side Story in 2011, Annie in 2012, Grease in 2013, Cats in 2014, and Rent in 2019.
