= Billy Morris (soccer) =

American soccer player

Personal information
- Place of birth: Scotland
- Position: Wing half

Senior career*
Years	Team	Apps	(Gls)
- Ardeer Thistle
- Hurlford United
1922–1923	Kilmarnock	2	(0)
1923–1924	Beith	27	(0)
1924–1929	Brooklyn Wanderers	181	(3)
1929–1930	Bridgeport Bears	3	(0)
1931	New York Americans	20	(0)

International career
1926	United States	1	(0)
- * Club domestic league appearances and goals

William Morris was a soccer player who played as a wing half. Born in Scotland, he earned one cap for the United States national team.

== Professional ==
Morris began his career with Ardeer Thistle of the Scottish Junior Football Association before moving to Hurlford United. In 1922, he signed with Kilmarnock of the Scottish Football League, though he played only two games before moving to Beith. In 1924, Morris moved to the United States where he signed with the Brooklyn Wanderers of the American Soccer League. In 1929, he began the season with Bridgeport Bears, but the Bears were sold a few games into the season and moved to Philadelphia. When that happened, Morris transferred to the New York Americans.

== National team ==
Morris earned one cap with the U.S. national team in a 6–2 win over Canada on November 6, 1926.

== See also ==
- List of United States men's international soccer players born outside the United States
