= Robert Evans (disambiguation) =

Robert Evans (1930–2019) was an American film producer.

Robert, Rob, Bob or Bobby Evans may also refer to:

== Business ==
- Robert Harding Evans (1778–1857), bookseller and auctioneer
- Robert B. Evans (1906–1998), industrialist, socialite, sportsman, and chairman of AMC
- Robert Evans (businessman) (1927–2020), British businessman, CEO and chairman of British Gas plc
- Bob Evans (restaurateur) (1918–2007), restaurateur and founder of Bob Evans Restaurants

== Education ==
- Robert F. Evans (died 1974), classical scholar
- Charles Evans (mountaineer) (Robert Charles Evans, 1918–1995), British mountaineer, surgeon, and educator
- R. J. W. Evans (Robert John Weston Evans, born 1943), professor of modern history

== Entertainment ==
- Rob Evans (Christian musician) (born 1953), children's singer-songwriter known as the Donut Man
- Robert Evans (screenwriter) (born 1977), playwright and actor
- Bob Evans, the stage name of Kevin Mitchell (musician) (born 1977)
- Rob Evans (writer) (born 1978), playwright
- Sutter Kain or Robert Evans (born 1983/84), rapper
- Robert Evans (journalist) (born 1988), former humor columnist for Cracked.com, journalist, and podcaster
- Rob Evans (born 1988), model and judge on America's Next Top Model

== Politics ==
- Robert Morgan Evans (1783–1844), American politician in Indiana
- Robert E. Evans (1856–1925), Nebraska Republican politician
- Robert Evans (Mississippi politician) (born 1950), member of the Mississippi House of Representatives
- Robert Evans (British politician) (born 1956), member of the European Parliament for the Labour and Co-operative parties
- Robert J. Evans (1853–1921), African American state legislator in Texas
- Robert William Evans (1862–1955), Australian politician, businessman and music advocate

== Science and technology ==
- Bob O. Evans (1927–2004), computer pioneer and corporate executive
- Robert Evans (astronomer) (1937–2022), amateur supernovae astronomer

== Sports ==
=== Football ===
- Robert Evans (footballer, born 1885) (1885–1965), footballer who played for Sheffield United
- Bob Evans (coach) (Melbourne C. Evans, 1889–1964), 1910s-era American university sports coach
- Bob Evans (footballer) (Robert Owen Evans, 1881–1962), 1900s-era Welsh goalkeeper
- Robert Spencer Evans (1911–1981), 1930s-era English footballer
- Bobby Evans (footballer) (1927–2001), Scottish footballer who played for Celtic and Chelsea F.C.
- Robert Evans (Australian footballer) (born 1960), former Australian rules footballer
- Rob Evans (footballer) (born 1995), Welsh footballer
- Robert Evans (English footballer), English amateur football right back

=== Other sports ===
- Robert Evans (racing driver) (1889–?), American racecar driver
- Robert Evans (cricketer) (1899–1981), English cricketer and educator
- Bob Evans (baseball) (1910–1947), American Negro leagues baseball player
- Bob Evans (basketball) (1925–1997), American professional basketball player
- Robert Evans (referee) (1939–2016), Welsh-American international soccer referee, author, and geologist
- Rob Evans (basketball) (born 1944), American college basketball coach and former college player
- Bob Evans (racing driver) (born 1947), British Formula One driver
- Bobby Evans (defensive back) (born 1967), Canadian football player
- Bobby Evans (baseball) (born 1969), general manager of the San Francisco Giants
- Bob Evans (wrestler) (born 1972), American professional wrestler and trainer
- Robert Evans (wrestler) (born 1983), Canadian professional wrestler
- Bob Evans (rugby union) (1921–2003), Wales international rugby union player
- Rob Evans (rugby union) (born 1992), Welsh rugby union player
- Bobby Evans (offensive lineman) (born 1997), American football player
- Robert De Friese Evans, American Paralympic athlete
- Robert Evans (hurdler), American hurdler, 3rd in the 400 m hurdles at the 1934 USA Outdoor Track and Field Championships

== Other people ==
- Robert Evans (Master of Magdalene) (died 1570), Welsh priest and academic
- Robert Evans (Archdeacon of Westmorland) (1789–1866), English Anglican archdeacon and author
- Robert Evans (Archdeacon of Cloyne) (1808–1889), Irish Anglican archdeacon
- Robert Anderson Evans (died 1901), English executioner
- Robert Evans (architect, 1832–1911), architect from Nottingham
- Robley D. Evans (admiral) (1846–1912), American naval fleet commander, known as "Fighting Bob"
- Robert K. Evans (1852–1926), United States Army officer
- Robert Evans (Jun) (1863–1927), English architect based in Nottingham
- Terry Peder Rasmussen (1943–2010) or Robert "Bob" Evans, suspected serial killer
- Robert C. Evans (born 1947), American prelate of the Roman Catholic Church
- Rob Evans (reporter), investigative reporter
- Robert G. Evans, Canadian economist

== See also ==
- Bert Evans (disambiguation)
- Bob Evans Restaurants, a chain of American restaurants
