= Andy Auld =

American soccer player (1900–1977)

- Auld on a United States's jersey, likely, in 1930

Personal information
- Full name: Andrew Auld
- Date of birth: April 30, 1900
- Place of birth: Stevenston, Scotland
- Date of death: December 6, 1977 (aged 77)
- Place of death: Johnston, Rhode Island, U.S.
- Position: Wing half

Youth career
- 1911–1913: Stevenston F.C.

Senior career*
Years	Team	Apps	(Gls)
1919–1921	Ardeer Thistle		
1921–1923	Parkhead		
1924–1928	Providence Clamdiggers	159	(20)
1928–1930	→ Providence Gold Bugs	118	(11)
1931	→ Fall River	10	(3)
1931–1933	Pawtucket Rangers		
1933–1935	Newark Portuguese		

International career
1926–1930	United States	5	(2)
Medal record
Men's soccer
Representing United States
FIFA World Cup
Third place	1930 Uruguay
- * Club domestic league appearances and goals

Andrew Auld (April 30, 1900 – December 6, 1977) was a soccer player who spent most of his professional career in the American Soccer League as a midfielder and forward. Born in Scotland, he earned five caps with the United States national team, three coming in the 1930 FIFA World Cup. He was inducted into the National Soccer Hall of Fame in 1986.

== Early career ==
Auld began his organized soccer career with Scottish club Stevenston F.C. in 1911, when he was eleven years old. He stayed with the club until he entered the military. His service continued through World War I until Auld was discharged in 1919. When he left the military, he joined Ardeer Thistle in 1919. He remained with the club for three years, until he moved to Glasgow club Parkhead in 1921. In 1923, he immigrated to the United States to live in Gillespie, Illinois. Life in the U.S. did not suit Auld and he decided to return to Scotland; however, he stopped en route to visit his sister who lived in Niagara Falls, New York. While there, he played a game of pick-up soccer with the Niagara Falls MacKenzies, playing with his brother. During the game, a scout for the Providence Clam Diggers of the American Soccer League (ASL) saw him and after the game convinced Auld to sign with the Diggers. At the time, the ASL was one of the highest paying and most competitive soccer leagues in the world. Team owners used these qualities to draw many of the top European, especially English and Scottish, players to the U.S.

== American Soccer League ==
Auld would spend six seasons with Providence, playing 277 games with them. In 1928, the club renamed itself the Gold Bugs. Then in 1930, a consortium of businessmen in Fall River, Massachusetts, bought the club and moved it to that city, renaming the team Fall River. Auld played ten games during the spring 1931 season with Fall River before moving to the Pawtucket Rangers for the remaining eight games of the spring 1931 season. When the first American Soccer League finally collapsed in 1933, the Rangers moved to the New England Division of the second American Soccer League for the 1933–1934 season. In 1934, he joined Newark Portuguese, a semi-professional team. However, he spent only two years with the club and retired from playing in 1935.

== National team ==
While Auld had an excellent professional career, he is best known as a member of the United States national team which took third place at the 1930 FIFA World Cup. Auld earned his first cap with the national team on November 6, 1926, in a 6-2 dismantling of Canada. He would score two goals on his international debut, his only efforts for the national team, but would not feature for the U.S. again until the first game of the World Cup. Auld was one of five native Scots to be included in American World Cup squad along with Alexander Wood, Bart McGhee, James Brown and Jimmy Gallagher. He played in both group stages against Belgium and Paraguay respectively, as the U.S. progressed to the semi-finals only to fall to Argentina in a particularly physical game. Several U.S. players were injured and the team finished with only eight fit field players. Auld himself was kicked in the mouth in the first half. According to the U.S. coach, Wilfred Cummings, the Argentinians scored their third goal “only after Andy Auld had his lip ripped wide open and one of the players from across the La Platte River had knocked the smelling salts out of Trainer Coll's hand and into Andy's eyes, temporarily blinding one of the outstanding 'little stars' of the World's Series." As substitutes were not permitted at the time, Auld played the rest of the game with a rag stuffed in his mouth to stem the bleeding. After the tournament, the U.S. traveled to Brazil where Auld and his teammates lost 4–3. That was his final game with the national team.

After retiring from playing professionally, Auld made his living in the sheet metal business. He died in Rhode Island on December 6, 1977. In 1986, he was inducted into the National Soccer Hall of Fame.

== See also ==
- List of United States men's international soccer players born outside the United States
