= Herbert Evans =

Herbert Evans may refer to:

- Herbert McLean Evans (1882–1971), American anatomist and embryologist
- Herbert Evans (politician) (1868–1931), British Labour Party Member of Parliament for Gateshead 1931
- Herbert Evans (actor) (1882–1952), British-born American film actor
- Herbert Evans (lawyer) (1884–1970), solicitor-general of New Zealand (1945–1956)
- Herbie Evans (1894–1982), former Welsh footballer

== See also ==
- Bert Evans (disambiguation)
