= Roy Milne =

American soccer player (1921–1998)

Personal information
- Full name: Robert Milne
- Date of birth: April 27, 1921
- Place of birth: Camelon, Scotland
- Date of death: June 29, 1998 (aged 77)
- Place of death: Stockport, England
- Position: Defender

Youth career
- 1940: Dunipace Thistle
- 1940: Polkemmet Juniors

Senior career*
Years	Team	Apps	(Gls)
1940–1952	Celtic	108	
1952–1955	New York Americans		
1955–	Danish-Americans		
- McIlvaine Canvasbacks

International career
1953	United States	1	(0)

Managerial career
- 1957: United Scots
- * Club domestic league appearances and goals

Robert "Roy" Milne (April 27, 1921 – June 29, 1998) was a soccer player who played as a defender. Born in England, he earned one cap for the United States national team.

== Player ==
=== Club ===
Milne began his career with Dunipace Thistle. In August 1940, he moved to Polkemmet Juniors. In November 1940, new Celtic manager Jimmy McStay made Milne his first signing as manager. He left the team to serve in the RAF during World War II. He returned to Celtic after the war and played for them until being released in May 1952. Milne made 108 Scottish Football League appearances for Celtic. He then moved to the United States where he signed with the New York Americans of the American Soccer League. In 1954, the Americans won the 1954 National Challenge Cup. In 1955, he and his wife moved to California, where he played for the Los Angeles Danish-Americans. By the late 1950s, Milne was with the amateur McIlvaine Canvasbacks of the Los Angeles League. In 1959, Milne and his teammates won the 1959 National Challenge Cup. In 1973, he and his wife owned and operated a hotel in Alva, Clackmannanshire.

=== International ===
Milne earned one cap with the U.S. national team in a 6–3 loss to England on June 8, 1953.

== Manager ==
While in California, Milne managed several teams, including the United Scots of Beverly Hills.

== See also ==
- List of United States men's international soccer players born outside the United States
