= Willie Fraser (footballer) =

Scottish footballer (1929–1996)

Personal information
- Full name: William Alexander Fraser
- Date of birth: 24 February 1929
- Place of birth: Melbourne, Australia
- Date of death: 7 March 1996 (aged 67)
- Place of death: Kirkcaldy, Scotland
- Position: Goalkeeper

Youth career
- Stirling Juniors

Senior career*
Years	Team	Apps	(Gls)
1946–1950	Third Lanark	63	(0)
1950–1954	Airdrieonians	103	(0)
1954–1959	Sunderland	127	(0)
1959	Nottingham Forest	2	(0)
- North Shields
Total		295	(0)

International career
1954	Scotland	2	(0)
- * Club domestic league appearances and goals

William Alexander Fraser (24 February 1929 – 7 March 1996) was a Scottish footballer who played as a goalkeeper for Sunderland and the Scotland national team.

== Club career ==
Born in Australia, Fraser started his professional footballing career with Third Lanark in 1946 and he made 63 appearances for the club until his departure to Airdrieonians in 1950. He joined Airdrie in 1950 and played for them up to 1954 and made a total of 103 appearances at his time there. He joined his third club, Sunderland, in 1954 and made his debut for them on 20 March 1954 against Tottenham Hotspur in 3–0 win at White Hart Lane. Fraser played for Sunderland from 1954 up until 1959 in that time he had made 127 appearances for the North East club. He left Sunderland and joined Nottingham Forest for one season, but played a mere two games and left for North Shields in 1959 before retiring.

== International career ==
He won his first cap for Scotland on 16 October 1954 against Wales in a 1–0 victory at Ninian Park. He made one further appearance for his country, making a total of two caps.

== See also ==
- List of Scotland international footballers born outside Scotland
