= Ed McIlvenny =

American soccer player

- McIlvenny during his playing days with the US

Personal information
- Full name: Edward Joseph McIlvenny
- Date of birth: October 21, 1924
- Place of birth: Greenock, Renfrewshire, Scotland
- Date of death: May 18, 1989 (aged 64)
- Place of death: Eastbourne, East Sussex, England
- Position: Wing half

Senior career*
Years	Team	Apps	(Gls)
1946–1947	Morton	0	(0)
1947–1948	Wrexham	7	(1)
1948	Fairhill Club		
1948–1950	Philadelphia Nationals		
1950–1953	Manchester United	2	(0)
1953–1957	Waterford	57	(19)
1957–1958	Headington United	39	(0)

International career
1950	United States	3	(0)
- * Club domestic league appearances and goals

Edward Joseph McIlvenny (21 October 1924 – 18 May 1989) was a Scottish soccer player who most notably captained the United States national team in their 1–0 upset of England at the 1950 FIFA World Cup.

== Early years ==
McIlvenny learned to play football as a youth, and while playing for Scottish club Morton, he was selected for a Scottish Junior League team on a tour of the north of Scotland. In 1947, he signed with the Welsh club Wrexham, then in the Third Division North of the English Football League, but he only played seven games for them before moving to the US in 1949 to stay with his sister.

== Career ==
In the United States, McIlvenny initially abandoned his soccer career in order to take an industrial job. According to his son, McIlvenny initially worked as a plumber's mate, also delivering eggs and milk. He later excelled with the Philadelphia Nationals of the American Soccer League, where he teamed up with US national team captain Walter Bahr. The Nationals won the league, with McIlvenny being declared the competition's outstanding player in June 1949. He was subsequently selected to join the U.S. national team during their 1950 World Cup appearance. He was given the honour of being captain for the game against England "because he was British", and in that game, it was his throw-in that led to the U.S. goal. Although he was not a U.S. citizen, he had declared his intention of becoming one and thus was eligible to play, according to the rules of the United States Soccer Football Association at the time.

However, he never did gain citizenship. Earlier that same year, he had played in an All-Star game against Manchester United and his play attracted the attention of United manager Matt Busby, who offered him a spot on the team after the World Cup. Upon his return to England, the English press called him "The Yank from the Tail of the Bank" (a reference to the sand bank that finishes at Greenock). He only had two appearances for them, however, and transferred to Waterford United of the League of Ireland instead. He played for them for four years and then returned to England to play for Headington United, after which he retired from playing and ran a football school.

== Honors ==
He was enshrined in the National Soccer Hall of Fame, along with the other members of the 1950 World Cup team, in 1976. He is also featured in the Scottish Football Museum.

== See also ==
- List of United States men's international soccer players born outside the United States
