= Fred Cameron =

American soccer player

Personal information
- Full name: Fred Cameron
- Place of birth: Toronto, Ontario, Canada
- Position: Defender

Senior career*
Years	Team	Apps	(Gls)
1953–1954	Aberdeen F.C.		
1954–1955	Toronto Ulster United FC		
1955–1956	Vancouver St. Andrews		
1956	Los Angeles Danes		
1957	Los Angeles Scots		
1957	Hollywood Soccer		
1958–1959	McIlvaine Canvasbacks		
1959–1961	Los Angeles Kickers		
1965–1969	Orange County SC		
1969–1970	Los Angeles Croatia		

International career
1959–1969	United States	6	(0)
- * Club domestic league appearances and goals

Fred Cameron is a former soccer player. Born in Canada, he represented the United States national team.

== Club career ==
Born in Toronto, Ontario, Canada, Cameron moved to Scotland to play soccer. On November 3, 1951, he signed with Aberdeen F.C. He also played for Banks O' Dee F.C. In 1954, he played in the National Soccer League with Toronto Ulster United FC. The following season he played in the Pacific Coast Soccer League with Vancouver St. Andrews. In 1955, Cameron moved to the United States, settling in Southern California where he became a prolific forward with a series of amateur clubs. Cameron played for at least two amateur clubs, San Pedro McIlvaine Canvasbacks and the Los Angeles Kickers. McIlvaine won the 1959 National Challenge Cup title with a 4–3 win over Fall River S.C. Cameron scored two of McIlvaine's goals. That year, Cameron was called into the U.S. national team where he was listed as playing for the Los Angeles Kickers Soccer Club. In 1966, Cameron was with Orange County All Stars when they lost to the Ukrainian Nationals in the final of the 1966 National Challenge Cup. In 1968, he played for the Los Angeles Soccer Club.

== National team ==
Cameron played six times for the U.S. national team between 1959 and 1969. His first cap came on May 28, 1959, in an 8–1 loss to England. He did not play again for the U.S. until 1965, when he played all 1966 FIFA World Cup qualifying games. All four games took place in March and the U.S. went 1–1–2, failing to qualify for the finals. Cameron did not play again for the U.S. until a 2–0 loss in a 1970 FIFA World Cup qualifying game against Haiti on April 20, 1969.

Cameron later moved to the Philippines where he co-owned a resort in Zambalas.
