= Willie Carson (soccer) =

Scottish-born U. S. soccer player

Personal information
- Position: Forward

Senior career*
Years	Team	Apps	(Gls)
1957-1960	Los Angeles Kickers		

International career
1959	United States MNT	1	(0)
- * Club domestic league appearances and goals

William Carson was a Scottish-born U.S. soccer player who earned one cap with the United States national team in an 8–1 loss to England on May 28, 1959. At the time, he played for the Los Angeles Kickers.

Carson scored the game-winning goal for the Los Angeles Kickers in the 1958 National Challenge Cup final.

== See also ==
- List of United States men's international soccer players born outside the United States
