= Ned Tate =

English footballer (1901–1985)

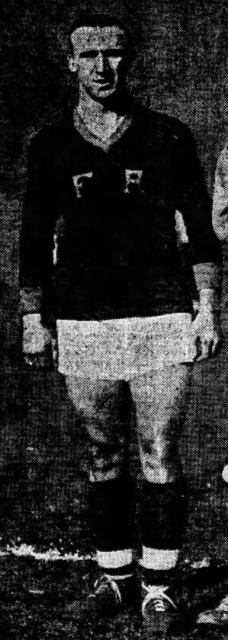
- Tate in 1924

Personal information
- Full name: Edward Tate
- Date of birth: 9 September 1901
- Place of birth: South Shields, England
- Date of death: 8 May 1985 (aged 83)
- Place of death: Fall River, Massachusetts, USA
- Position: Full-back

Senior career*
Years	Team	Apps	(Gls)
1921	New Waterford		
1922	Canadian Explosives		
1922–1926	Fall River	127	(0)
1926–1927	J&P Coats	20	(0)
1927–1928	Fall River	17	(0)
1928	New Bedford Whalers	8	(0)
1928	J&P Coats	8	(0)
1929	Philadelphia Field Club	2	(0)
1929–1930	Fall River	7	(0)
1930–1931	Pawtucket Rangers	83	(0)

Managerial career
- 1933–1935: Pawtucket Rangers
- * Club domestic league appearances and goals

Edward Tate (born 1901 in South Shields, England) was an English football full-back who began his career in Canada and finished it in the American Soccer League.

Tate, a native of England, was described as a "big, burly, right fullback" that was a "colorful, wholehearted" player. He played with the England national team at the schoolboy level. At some point, he moved to Canada where he began his professional career in 1921 with New Waterford in Nova Scotia, Canada. He then moved to Canadian Explosives in 1922. That year, he left Canada and signed with the Fall River of the American Soccer League. He spent four seasons in Fall River, winning the 1924 National Challenge Cup with them. He then began the 1926–27 season in Fall River before moving to J&P Coats ten games into the season. However, he was back in Fall River for the 1927–28 season when J&P Coats traded him on 19 August 1927 for Findlay Kerr. For the next three seasons, Tate bounced through several teams. While he began the 1927–28 season in Fall River, he jumped to New Bedford Whalers at the end of the season. He then returned to J&P Coats for the start of the 1928–1929 season only to finish it with Philadelphia Field Club. He then played the fall 1929 and began the 1929–30 season with the 'Marksmen', but finished it with the Pawtucket Rangers. He finally found a home in Pawtucket and remained with the Rangers until his retirement when he became the team's coach for two seasons.
