= Thomson Ferrans =

American-Scottish soccer player

Thomson Ferrans (May 13, 1916, in Scotland – October 21, 2006, in Rochester Hills, Michigan) was a U.S.-Scottish soccer defender. Ferrans earned three caps with the U.S. national team in 1937.

== Youth ==
Was the youngest of 11 children, all of which were boys. While born in Scotland, he grew up in Michigan, graduating from Detroit's Southwestern High School in 1933.

== Club career ==
Ferrans played his club career in Michigan. In 1939, he was a member of a Michigan All Star team which played the touring Scottish team. In both 1941 and 1942, he was with Detroit Chrysler when they lost consecutive U.S. Challenge Cup championship games to the Pawtucket Rangers. In the second game, he scored a penalty goal in the loss.

== National team ==
Ferrans earned three caps with the U.S. national team in 1937. All three were losses to Mexico in September.

== Non-soccer career ==
Ferrans served in the U.S. Army in both World War II and the Korean War. After retiring from playing soccer, he lived rest of his life in Detroit and Warren, Michigan. He was married to Agnes 'Nancy' Blair Graham (1919–1989) and had two children, Robert '49 and Barbara '52; and five grandchildren: Andrew '86, Samantha '87, Colleen '89, Ross '91, and Liam '95. He died on October 21, 2006, in a Rochester Hills, Michigan nursing home at the age of ninety.

== See also ==
- List of United States men's international soccer players born outside the United States
