= Albert Evans (footballer, born 1901) =

English footballer

Personal information
- Date of birth: 17 October 1901
- Place of birth: Camberwell, England
- Date of death: 1969 (aged 67–68)
- Position: Forward

Senior career*
Years	Team	Apps	(Gls)
??	Woking	?	(?)
1927–1928	Tottenham Hotspur	5	(0)
??	Grantham Town	?	(0)
- * Club domestic league appearances and goals

Albert Evans (17 October 1901 – 1969) was a professional footballer who played for Woking, Tottenham Hotspur and Grantham Town.

== Football career ==
Evans began his career at Woking. The forward joined Tottenham Hotspur in 1927 where he played in five matches between 1927 and 1928. After leaving the Lilywhites he went on to play for Grantham Town.
