= Albert Evans (Welsh footballer) =

Welsh footballer

Personal information
- Full name: Albert H. Evans
- Place of birth: Cardiff, Wales
- Positions: Wing half; inside forward

Senior career*
Years	Team	Apps	(Gls)
1931–1933	Cardiff City	22	(0)
- Dundalk
- * Club domestic league appearances and goals

Albert H. Evans was a Welsh professional footballer who played as a wing half or inside forward. He made over 20 appearances in the Football League for Cardiff City.
