= Jock Ferguson (soccer) =

Scottish-American soccer player

Personal information
- Date of birth: September 17, 1887
- Place of birth: Dundee, Scotland
- Date of death: September 19, 1973 (aged 86)
- Place of death: Bethlehem, Pennsylvania, United States
- Height: 5 ft 8 in (1.73 m)
- Position: Full back

Youth career
- Dundee North End

Senior career*
Years	Team	Apps	(Gls)
- Arbroath
1910–1911	St Johnstone		
1911–1912	Dundee	21	(0)
1912–1913	Leeds City	17	(0)
1913–1914	Gateshead		
1914–1915	Clydebank	6	(0)
1915–1921	Bethlehem Steel		
1921–1922	Philadelphia Field Club	22	(0)
1922–1923	J&P Coats	24	(0)
1923–1928	Bethlehem Steel	45	(0)

International career
1925	United States	1	(0)
- * Club domestic league appearances and goals

John Ferguson (September 17, 1887 – September 19, 1973) was a Scottish-American soccer full back. He began his career in Scotland before moving to England, then the United States. He earned one cap with the U.S. national team in 1925. He is a member of the National Soccer Hall of Fame.

== Professional career ==
Born in Dundee, Ferguson began his career with Scottish club Arbroath; he then played for St Johnstone and hometown club Dundee before moving to English club Leeds City at the end of the 1911–12 season. In early 1915, he moved to the United States, eventually signing with Bethlehem Steel. There is no clear information on when he signed with Bethlehem but his first game was an exhibition match against the University of Pennsylvania on April 12, 1915. From that game on, Ferguson became a regular on the Bethlehem rosters. From 1915 to 1919, he played in five consecutive National Challenge Cup finals as Bethlehem Steel won four, losing only the 1917 title game to the Fall River Rovers. In the first few years of Ferguson's time with Bethlehem, the team competed in various amateur Pennsylvania leagues. In 1917, they joined the professional National Association Football League, winning three consecutive league titles from 1919 to 1921. In 1921, the first American Soccer League replaced the NAFBL. Bethlehem's owners decided to move the team to Philadelphia, renaming the team the Philadelphia Field Club for the 1921–1922 ASL season. Ferguson spent that season in Philadelphia, winning the first ASL league title. In 1922, he moved to J&P Coats. He won the 1922–23 league title, giving him five league and four Challenge Cup titles. On September 8, 1923, he returned to Bethlehem, winning one last league title in the 1927. However, by 1924, age and injuries had conspired to limit his playing time. While he continued to play sporadically, filling in when Bethlehem had injuries to its backline, until his retirement in 1928 at the age of forty-two, he spent most of his time as the team's trainer. During his second stint with Bethlehem, he traded playing time with his younger brother, Davey Ferguson. He died in Bethlehem, Pennsylvania, aged 86.

== National team ==
Ferguson earned one cap with the U.S. national team in a 1–0 loss to Canada on June 27, 1925.

He was inducted into the National Soccer Hall of Fame in 1950.

== See also ==
- List of United States men's international soccer players born outside the United States
