= Findlay Kerr =

Soccer player (1897–1980)

Personal information
- Date of birth: January 16, 1897
- Place of birth: Millport, Isle of Cumbrae, Scotland
- Date of death: November 1980 (aged 83)
- Position: Goalkeeper

Senior career*
Years	Team	Apps	(Gls)
1920–1923	Bethlehem Steel	36	(0)
1923–1927	Fall River F.C.	118	(0)
1927–1928	J&P Coats	89	(0)
1928–1930	→ Pawtucket Rangers	72	(0)

International career
1926	United States	1	(0)
- * Club domestic league appearances and goals

Findlay "Lindy" Kerr (January 16, 1897 – November 1980) was a soccer player who played as a goalkeeper in the National Association Football League and American Soccer League. Born in Scotland, he earned one cap with the United States national team.

== Professional career ==
Some sources state that Kerr began his career in the Scottish League. Regardless, he signed with the U.S. club Bethlehem Steel during the 1920-1921 National Association Football League (NAFBL) season. His first start came in a 9–0 win over Disston A.A. on January 12, 1921. The NAFBL folded at the end of the season, to be replaced by the first American Soccer League. With the change in league, the owners of Bethlehem Steel moved the team to Philadelphia, renaming it the Philadelphia Field Club. Kerr spent the 1921-1922 ASL season in Philadelphia, then moved with the team back to Bethlehem the next season. In October 1923, he moved to the Fall River F.C. The 'Marksmen' won the 1924, 1925 and 1926 league titles in addition to the 1924 National Challenge Cup championship. By the 1926–1927 season, Kerr was serving mostly as a backup and on August 19, 1927, the 'Marksmen' traded Kerr to J&P Coats for Ned Tate and a player to be named later (Tommy Martin). In 1928, the team was sold to new owners who renamed the team the Pawtucket Rangers. Kerr retired in 1930.

== International career ==
Kerr earned his cap with the U.S. national team in a 6–2 win over Canada on November 6, 1926.

== See also ==
- List of United States men's international soccer players born outside the United States
