= Edward Tate =

English cricketer

Personal information
- Born: 30 August 1877; Lyndhurst, Hampshire, England
- Died: 4 January 1953 (aged 75); Malvern, Worcestershire, England
- Nickname: Father
- Batting: Right-handed
- Bowling: Right-arm medium

Domestic team information
- Years: Team
- 1898–1902: Hampshire
- 1899–1902: Marylebone Cricket Club
- 1910–1923: Devon

Career statistics
Competition	First-class
Matches	35
Runs scored	326
Batting average	7.24
100s/50s	0/0
Top score	34*
Balls bowled	4,598
Wickets	66
Bowling average	31.12
5 wickets in innings	2
10 wickets in match	1
Best bowling	8/51
Catches/stumpings	13/–
- Source: Cricinfo, 24 January 2010

Edward Tate (30 August 1877 – 4 January 1953) was an English first-class cricketer and cricket coach.

Tate was born in the New Forest at Lyndhurst in August 1877. He made his debut in first-class cricket for Hampshire against Yorkshire at Huddersfield in the 1898 County Championship, taking 5 for 83 against a strong Yorkshire team. Tate played first-class cricket for Hampshire until 1902, making 29 appearances. Playing primarily as a right-arm medium pace bowler, he took 56 wickets for Hampshire at an average of 31.03; he took two five wicket hauls and took ten-wickets in a match once, all in 1898. His debut season was his most successful, with 35 wickets at an average of 27.94. In this season, alongside his five wicket haul on debut, he also took figures of 8 for 51 (match figures of 11 for 114) against Somerset on a crumbling pitch at Bournemouth, which saw Hampshire overcome a first innings deficit of 115 to win by nine runs. In addition to playing for Hampshire, Tate also made five first-class appearances for the Marylebone Cricket Club between 1899 and 1902 and one for A. J. Webbe's personal team.

Following the end of his playing career with Hampshire at the end of the 1902 season, Tate was employed by Malvern College in Worcestershire as their cricket professional and manager of the college clothing store, an association which lasted for fifty years. During the summer break, he began playing minor counties cricket for Devon, beginning in 1910. He played for Devon either side of the First World War, making thirteen appearances in the Minor Counties Championship until 1923. During the war, he served with the Royal Artillery in France on the Western Front. Tate died at Malvern in January 1953.
