= Bill Carnihan =

Soccer player (1894–1964)

Personal information
- Date of birth: 12 July 1894
- Place of birth: Hamilton, South Lanarkshire, Scotland
- Date of death: 16 November 1964 (aged 70)
- Place of death: Allentown, Pennsylvania, USA
- Positions: Center half; midfielder

Senior career*
Years	Team	Apps	(Gls)
- Blantyre Victoria
1921–1922	Partick Thistle	5	(0)
1922–1930	Bethlehem Steel	210	(2)
1930–1931	Newark Americans	23	(0)
1931	New York Americans	1	(0)

International career
1925–1926	United States	2	(0)
- * Club domestic league appearances and goals

William D. Carnihan (12 July 1894 – 16 November 1964) was a footballer who played as a center half and midfielder. He began his professional career in Scotland before moving to the American Soccer League. Born in Scotland, he earned two caps with the U.S. national team.

== Club career ==
Carnihan began his career with Scottish club Blantyre Victoria. In 1921, he moved to Partick Thistle for a single season. In 1922, he moved to the United States where he signed with Bethlehem Steel of the American Soccer League. Over the next eight seasons, he was a regular in the Bethlehem midfield, playing 210 games in the ASL. These stats do not include the season that Bethlehem played in the Eastern Professional Soccer League after being suspended by the ASL a month into the 1928–1929 season. Carnihal was injured in March 1930 and lost most of the rest of that season. When Bethlehem folded at the end of the 1930 spring season, Carnihan moved to the Newark Americans for the fall 1930 and spring 1931 seasons. He then played one game with the New York Americans in the fall 1931 season before retiring.

== International career ==
Carnihan's first game with the national team in a 6–1 win over Canada on 11 November 1925. His second came almost exactly a year later in a 6–2 win over Canada on 6 November 1926.

== See also ==
- List of United States men's international soccer players born outside the United States
