= Ardeer Thistle F.C. =

Association football club in Scotland

Ardeer Thistle
- Full name: Ardeer Thistle Football Club
- Nickname: The Thistle
- Founded: 1900
- Ground: Ardeer Stadium, Stevenston
- Capacity: 2500
- Coordinates: 55°38′18″N 4°45′9″W
- Manager: Kenny Henderson
- League: West of Scotland League Second Division
- 2025–26: West of Scotland League Third Division, 8th of 16 (promoted)
| Home colours | Away colours |

Ardeer Thistle Football Club are a Scottish football club from Stevenston in North Ayrshire. Formed as a Juvenile Club in 1900, they moved up to the Juniors in season 1902–03 and are based at Ardeer Stadium. Nicknamed "The Thistle", they compete in the West of Scotland League Second Division and players wear red and white home kits and sky blue change strips.

On 13 June 2026, Kenny Henderson was announced as the new 1st team Manager, after Sean Kenneys resignation.

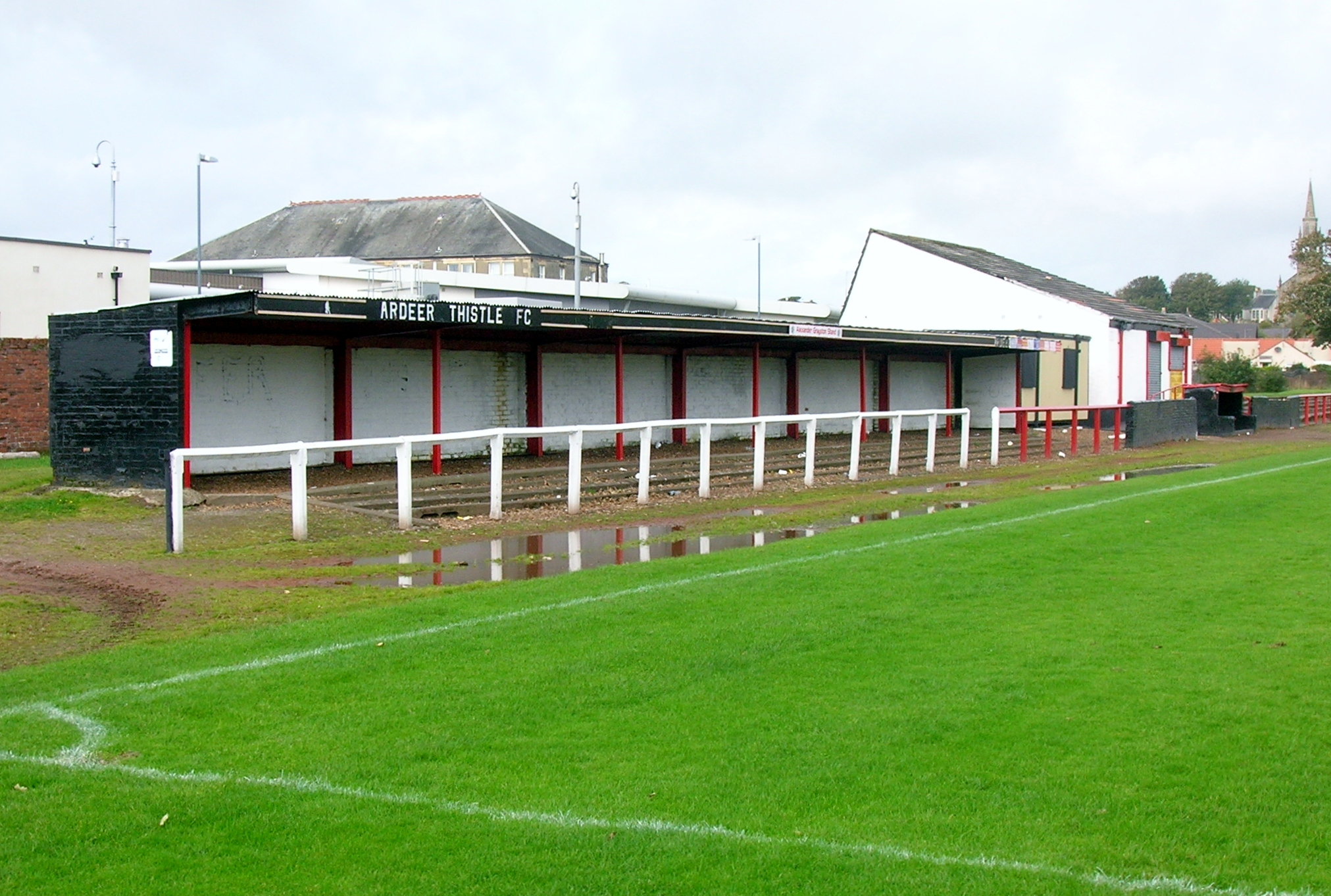
Covered area at Ardeer Stadium (2012)

== Honours ==
- Ayrshire District League runners-up: 2013–14
- Western League Winners: 1924–25, 1959–60
- Ayrshire Second Division winners: 1991–92
- Ayrshire Junior Cup Winners: 1924–25, 1925–26, 1959–60, 1965–66
- Western League Cup Winners: 1925–26, 1959–60, 1960–61
- Irvine & District Cup Winners: 1906–07, 1907–08, 1908–09, 1915–16, 1925–26, 1961–62, 1962–63

== Notable players ==
- (Scotland) (United States) Andy Auld (1919–1921)
- (Italy) Alessandro Zarrelli (2006–2008)
- (Scotland) Ross Stewart (2013–2015)
