= John Mason (soccer) =

American soccer player

Personal information
- Full name: John Douglas Mason
- Date of birth: June 24, 1953 (age 73)
- Place of birth: Bellshill, Scotland
- Height: 5 ft 10 in (1.78 m)
- Position: Midfielder

Senior career*
Years	Team	Apps	(Gls)
1975–1977	Los Angeles Aztecs	39	(8)

International career
1977	United States	1	(0)
- * Club domestic league appearances and goals

John Mason was a soccer player who played as a defender who played in the North American Soccer League. Born in Scotland, he earned one cap with the United States national team.

Mason was the first American Youth Soccer Organization (A.Y.S.O.) graduate to turn professional in early 1975. He played for the Los Angeles Aztecs of the North American Soccer League from 1975 to 1977. He earned his cap in a 1-1 World Cup qualification tie with Canada on September 24, 1977.

== See also ==
- List of United States men's international soccer players born outside the United States
