= Doug Farquhar =

American soccer player (1921–2005)

Personal information
- Full name: Douglas Methven Farquhar
- Date of birth: June 11, 1921
- Place of birth: Methil, Scotland
- Date of death: February 20, 2005 (aged 83)
- Place of death: New York City, U.S.
- Position: Wing half

Youth career
- St Andrews United

Senior career*
Years	Team	Apps	(Gls)
1944–1950	Arsenal	0	(0)
- → Distillery (guest)
1950–1952	Reading	9	(1)
1952–1954	Hereford United		
1954–1957	Bedford Town	92	(2)
1957–?	New York Hakoah		

International career
1959	United States	1	(0)
- * Club domestic league appearances and goals

Douglas Methven Farquhar (June 11, 1921 – February 20, 2005) was a soccer player who played professionally on both sides of the Atlantic Ocean. Born in Scotland, he earned one cap for the United States national team

== Club career ==
Farquhar started his career at junior side St Andrews United, before joining Arsenal in 1944. During World War II he guested with Irish side Distillery. He was exclusively a reserve player with Arsenal, never playing a first-team game, although he won a Football Combination medal with the second-string side in 1946–47.

In September 1950 he joined Reading on a free transfer. He played nine league games, scoring one goal. He then moved to non-league Hereford United and Bedford Town. In May 1957, he moved to the US, where he signed with the New York Hakoah of the American Soccer League.

== International career ==
Farquhar earned one cap with the U.S. national team in an 8–1 loss to England on May 28, 1959. At nearly 38 years old, he was the oldest player to make his international debut in any England match.

== See also ==
- List of United States men's international soccer players born outside the United States
