= Jack Lyons (soccer) =

American soccer player (1901-1987)

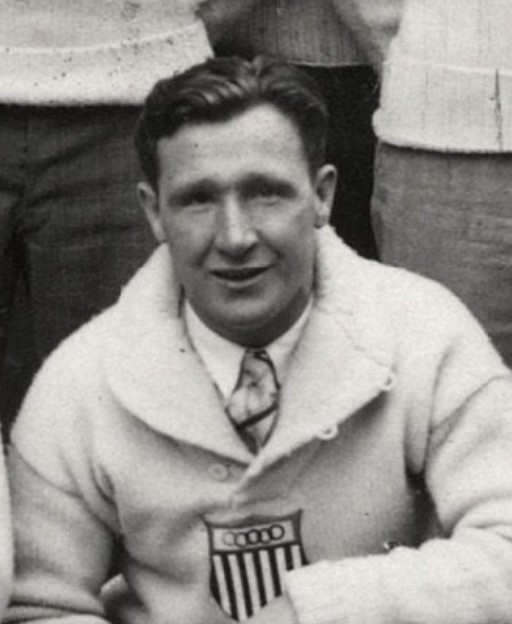
- Jack Lyons in 1928

Personal information
- Full name: John P. Lyons
- Date of birth: May 19, 1901
- Place of birth: Govan, Scotland
- Date of death: October 2, 1987 (aged 86)
- Position: Fullback

Senior career*
Years	Team	Apps	(Gls)
1926–1927	Providence F.C.	8	(0)
- Fore River Shamrocks
1931	Boston Bears	1	(0)

International career
1928	United States	2	(0)
- * Club domestic league appearances and goals

John P. Lyons (May 19, 1901 – October 2, 1987) was a soccer player who played as a fullback for part of two seasons in the American Soccer League. Born in Scotland, he earned two caps with the United States men's national soccer team in 1928.

== Professional ==
Lyons played eight games with Providence F.C. in the 1926-1927 American Soccer League season. He then played for the Fore River Shamrocks. He re-entered the ASL in the spring of 1931 when he played one game with the Boston Bears.

== National team ==
Lyons earned two caps with the U.S. national team. The first came at the 1928 Summer Olympics when the U.S. lost to Argentina 11–2. Following this loss, the U.S. tied Poland, 3-3, on June 10, 1928.

== See also ==
- List of United States men's international soccer players born outside the United States
