= List of United States youth national soccer teams =

Youth national soccer teams of the United States

This is a list of United States youth national soccer teams, administered by the United States Soccer Federation, representing the United States in youth international soccer.

== Men's ==
- United States men's national under-23 soccer team
- United States men's national under-20 soccer team
- United States men's national under-19 soccer team
- United States men's national under-18 soccer team
- United States men's national under-17 soccer team
- United States boys' national under-15 soccer team

== Women's ==
- United States women's national under-23 soccer team
- United States women's national under-20 soccer team
- United States women's national under-19 soccer team
- United States women's national under-18 soccer team
- United States women's national under-17 soccer team
- United States girls' national under-16 soccer team
- United States girls' national under-15 soccer team

== See also ==
- United States men's national soccer team
- United States women's national soccer team
- United States soccer league system
- Major League Soccer
- Soccer in the United States
