= Manu Romero =

American soccer player (born 2009)

Personal information
- Full name: Manuel Romero Santiago
- Date of birth: April 9, 2009 (age 17)
- Place of birth: Raleigh, North Carolina, US
- Height: 5 ft 9 in (1.75 m)
- Position: Defender

Team information
- Current team: Real Madrid

Youth career
- 2014–2015: Mijas-Las Lagunas
- 2015–2021: Málaga
- 2021–: Real Madrid

International career^{‡}
Years	Team	Apps	(Gls)
2023	Uruguay U15	2	(0)
2023–2025	United States U15	5	(1)
2025–	United States U17	2	(0)
- ‡ National team caps and goals as of October 14, 2025

Manuel Romero Santiago (born April 9, 2009) is an American soccer player who plays as a defender for the academy of La Liga club Real Madrid.

== Early life ==
Romero was born on April 9, 2009, in Raleigh, North Carolina, United States. He is the son of Uruguay international Marcelo Romero.

== Club career ==
As a youth player, Romero joined the youth academy of Spanish side Mijas-Las Lagunas. Following his stint there, he joined the youth academy of Spanish side Málaga in 2015.

During the summer of 2021, he joined the youth academy of Spanish La Liga side Real Madrid.

== International career ==
Romero is a Uruguay and United States youth international. On October 14, 2025, he debuted for the United States men's national under-17 soccer team during a 2–0 friendly away win over the Northern Ireland national under-17 football team.

== Style of play ==
Romero plays as a defender. American news website US Soccer Collective wrote in 2025 that he "is a dynamic wide player with a lethal left foot, combining final-third instincts, one-on-one creativity, and impressive composure under pressure".
