= Bert Evans =

American soccer player

Personal information
- Full name: Hubert William Richard Evans
- Date of birth: August 10, 1922
- Place of birth: Swansea, Wales
- Date of death: May 8, 2008 (aged 85)
- Place of death: Sylvan Valley, Ontario, Canada
- Position: Defender

Senior career*
Years	Team	Apps	(Gls)
1939–1940	Swansea Town		
1945–1951	Lovell's Athletic		
1951–1952	Newport County	14	(1)
1952–1957	Llanelli		
1957–1961	McIlvaine Canvasbacks		
1961–?	San Pedro Toros		

International career
1959	United States	1	(0)
- * Club domestic league appearances and goals

Bert Evans (August 10, 1922 – May 8, 2008) was a soccer player. Born in Wales, he earned one cap for the United States national team in an 8–1 loss to England on May 28, 1959.

Evans signed professional forms with Swansea Town on his 17th birthday in August 1939. Just three weeks later, however, war broke out and the Football League suspended operations. Evans would never get the chance to shine for his hometown team. He joined the Royal Air Force and played for their representative XI when stationed in Egypt. After the hostilities, Evans rebuilt his football career, signing for Lovell's Athletic. After winning the Welsh Football League, the club graduated to the Southern League in 1947. In April 1951, Hubert Evans signed for Newport County, at long last making his debut in the Football League at 28 years of age. After 14 appearances (1 goal), Evans returned to the Southern League with another Welsh club, Llanelli. In 1957, Evans moved to the United States and settled in California. When he arrived he joined the semi-professional San Pedro McIlvaine Canvasbacks, playing as a central defender and team captain when they won the 1959 National Challenge Cup. In 1961, he moved to the San Pedro Toros.
