= 1959 National Challenge Cup =

- Dewar Challenge Cup

Tournament details
- Country: United States
- Dates: 8 February – 8 June 1959

Final positions
- Champions: McIlvaine Canvasbacks (1st title)
- Runners-up: Fall River S.C.
- Semifinalists: St. Louis Kutis S.C.; Ukrainian Nationals

The 1959 National Challenge Cup was the 46th edition of the United States Soccer Football Association's annual open soccer championship.

== Overview ==
The McIlvaine Canvasbacks of San Pedro, California defeated Fall River SC in a contentious final. McIlvaine scored three unanswered goals in the first half, but Fall River came back, tying the score in the 88th minute. A minute later, Al Herman scored the winning goal for the Canvasbacks. Fall River disputed the goal and the team's trainer, Abel Botelho attacked Herman, leading to Botelho's ejection.

== Bracket ==
=== East ===
March 8 - April 12
MA	Fall River SC	3-1
NY	New York Hakoah	1-1
PA	Ukrainian Nationals	2-1
MI	St. Andrews	1-1

April 26 - May 3
MA	Fall River SC	3-1
PA	Ukrainian Nationals	1-1

=== West ===
February 8 - March 1
MO	St. Louis Kutis	0-6
IL	Chicago Lions	3-0
CA	McIlvaine Canvasbacks	0-7
CA	San Francisco	2-2

May 3
MO	St. Louis Kutis	2
CA	McIlvaine Canvasbacks	3

== Final ==
June 8, 1959

McIlvaine Canvasbacks (CA)	4–3	Fall River SC (MA)
Fred Cameron; Alex O'Neill; Al Herman 89'		William Silva; Jack Sharples; 88' Allison

Rancho La Cienega Stadium, Los Angeles, California
Attendance: 3,800
Referee: George Woods (USA)
