= Tommy Steel =

Scottish-born American soccer player

Personal information
- Place of birth: Glasgow, Scotland
- Position: Goalkeeper

Senior career*
| Years | Team | Apps | (Gls) |
- Fore River
| 1924–1926 | Boston Soccer Club | 36 | (0) |
| 1926–1928 | New Bedford Whalers | 69 | (0) |
| 1928–1929 | Fall River | 1 | (0) |
| 1929 | Philadelphia Field Club | 4 | (0) |

International career
| 1925 | United States | 1 | (0) |
- * Club domestic league appearances and goals

Tommy Steel was a soccer goalkeeper who earned one cap with the U.S. national team in 1925. He also spent five seasons in the American Soccer League.

== Professional career ==
Born in Glasgow, Scotland, Steel emigrated with sister Jessie and brother Sandy(also a goalkeeper)to Fall River he began his career in the United States with Fore River of the Southern New England Soccer League. In 1924, he signed with the Boston Soccer Club of the American Soccer League, playing two seasons with them. In 1926, he joined the New Bedford Whalers, but moved to the Fall River eight games into the 1928–29 season. He played only one game with Fall River before finishing his career with Philadelphia Field Club. He retired in 1929.

== National team ==
Steel earned his cap with the U.S. national team in an 8 November 1925 victory over Canada.

== See also ==
- List of United States men's international soccer players born outside the United States
