= Alexander Wood (soccer) =

American soccer player (1907–1987)

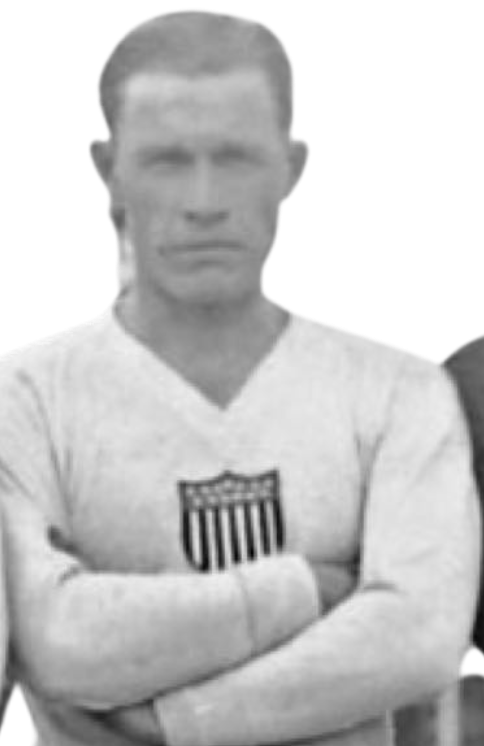

Personal information
- Full name: Alexander Lochian Wood
- Date of birth: June 12, 1907
- Place of birth: Lochgelly, Scotland
- Date of death: July 20, 1987 (aged 80)
- Place of death: Gary, Indiana, U.S.
- Height: 5 ft 9 in (1.75 m)
- Position: Defender

Senior career*
Years	Team	Apps	(Gls)
- Bricklayers and Masons
–1930	Holley Carburetor		
1930–1931	Brooklyn Wanderers	31	(2)
1933–1936	Leicester City	52	(0)
1936–1937	Nottingham Forest	21	(0)
1937–1938	Colchester United	34	(0)
1938–1939	Chelmsford City		

International career
1930	United States	4	(0)
Medal record
Men's soccer
Representing United States
FIFA World Cup
Third place	1930 Uruguay
- * Club domestic league appearances and goals

Alexander Lochian Wood (June 12, 1907 – July 20, 1987) was a soccer player who played as a defender. Wood began his club career in the United States before moving to England in the early 1930s. Born in Scotland, he played in all three U.S. games at the 1930 FIFA World Cup. He is a member of the National Soccer Hall of Fame.

== Youth ==
Wood's parents moved the family to the United States in 1921 when Wood was fourteen years old. His family settled in Gary, Indiana, where he attended Emerson High School and gained his U.S. citizenship a year later. He also worked for the local Union Drawn Steel Company.

== Club career ==
Wood began his club career with Chicago Bricklayers and Masons F.C. In 1928, the Bricklayers went to the National Challenge Cup final before losing to New York Nationals. He then moved to Detroit Holley Carburetor. In 1930, Wood turned professional with the Brooklyn Wanderers of the American Soccer League. The Wanderers folded in 1931, and there is a gap in Wood's career for two years. In 1933 Wood moved to England to play with Leicester City. In 1936, he transferred to Nottingham Forest for one season before joined Colchester United in 1937. In 1938, he moved to Chelmsford City of the Southern League before retiring in 1939 and returning to the United States.

== National team ==
=== Scotland youth ===
In 1921, Wood played once for Scotland in a junior team match against Wales before moving to the United States.

=== U.S. senior ===
Wood would earn four caps with the U.S. national team in 1930. Three of the games came at the 1930 FIFA World Cup. At that tournament, the U.S. won the first two games, over Belgium and Paraguay by a 3–0 score in each game, but they lost to Argentina 6–1 in the semifinals. Following the tournament, the U.S. played Brazil on August 17, 1930, before returning to the U.S. That was Wood's final game with the national team.

== Post soccer career ==
After retiring from playing professional soccer, Wood moved back to Gary, Indiana, where he worked for the U.S. Steel Corporation. He retired in 1970 and was inducted into the National Soccer Hall of Fame in 1986.

== Honors ==
=== Club ===
Colchester United

- Southern Football League Winner (1): 1938–39

== See also ==
- List of United States men's international soccer players born outside the United States
