= Football at the 1928 Summer Olympics – Men's team squads =

The following squads were named for the 1928 Summer Olympics tournament.

== Argentina ==
Head coach: (Spain) José Lago Millán

No.	Pos.	Player	Date of birth (age)	Caps	Club
2	DF	Ludovico Bidoglio	5 February 1900 (aged 28)		(Argentina) Boca Juniors
1	GK	Ángel Bossio	5 May 1905 (aged 23)		(Argentina) Talleres (BA)
5	MF	Saúl Calandra	22 October 1904 (aged 23)		(Argentina) Estudiantes (LP)
8	FW	Alfredo Carricaberry	8 October 1900 (aged 27)		(Argentina) San Lorenzo
10	MF	Roberto Cherro	23 February 1907 (aged 21)		(Argentina) Boca Juniors
12	GK	Octavio Díaz	7 October 1900 (aged 27)		(Argentina) Rosario Central
14	DF	Juan Evaristo	20 June 1902 (aged 25)		(Argentina) Sp. Palermo
9	FW	Manuel Ferreira	22 October 1905 (aged 22)		(Argentina) Estudiantes (LP)
15	FW	Enrique Gainzarain	7 December 1904 (aged 23)		(Argentina) Ferro Carril Oeste
19	DF	Alberto Helman			(Argentina) Estudiantes (SdE)
17	MF	Segundo Luna	20 April 1902 (aged 26)		(Argentina) Club Atlético Mitre
4	DF	Ángel Médici	20 December 1897 (aged 30)		(Argentina) Boca Juniors
6	MF	Luis Monti	15 May 1901 (aged 27)		(Argentina) San Lorenzo
18	MF	Pedro Ochoa	22 February 1900 (aged 28)		(Argentina) Racing
13	DF	Rodolfo Orlandini	1 January 1905 (aged 23)		(Argentina) Sp. Buenos Aires
11	FW	Raimundo Orsi	2 December 1901 (aged 26)		(Argentina) Independiente
3	DF	Fernando Paternoster	24 May 1903 (aged 25)		(Argentina) Racing
20	FW	Feliciano Perducca	9 June 1901 (aged 26)		(Argentina) Boca Alumni
22	FW	Natalio Perinetti	28 December 1900 (aged 27)		(Argentina) Racing
7	FW	Domingo Tarasconi	20 December 1903 (aged 24)		(Argentina) Boca Juniors
16	DF	Luis Weihmuller	2 August 1902 (aged 25)		(Argentina) Sp. Palermo
21	DF	Adolfo Zumelzú	5 January 1902 (aged 26)		(Argentina) Sp. Palermo

== Belgium ==
Head coach: (Austria) Victor Löwenfelt

No.	Pos.	Player	Date of birth (age)	Caps	Club
-	FW	Henri Bierna	2 September 1905 (aged 22)		(Belgium) US Liège
-	MF	Gustave Boesman	19 January 1899 (aged 29)		(Belgium) K.A.A. Gent
-	MF	Pierre Braine	26 October 1900 (aged 27)		(Belgium) K. Beerschot V.A.C.
-	FW	Raymond Braine	28 April 1907 (aged 21)		(Belgium) Beerschot
-	GK	Jean Caudron	15 November 1895 (aged 32)		(Belgium) R.S.C. Anderlecht
-	GK	Jean De Bie	9 May 1892 (aged 36)		(Belgium) Racing Club de Bruxelles
-	FW	Leon De Coninck			(Belgium) La Gantoise
-	DF	Henri De Deken	3 August 1907 (aged 20)		(Belgium) Royal Antwerp F.C.
-	FW	Georges De Spae	30 September 1900 (aged 27)		(Belgium) K.A.A. Gent
-	FW	Gérard Devos	19 August 1903 (aged 24)		(Belgium) Cercle Brugge
-	FW	Jan Diddens	14 September 1908 (aged 19)		(Belgium) K.R.C. Mechelen
-	MF	Georges Ditzler	15 November 1897 (aged 30)		(Belgium) Standard Liège
-	MF	Auguste Hellemans	21 June 1907 (aged 20)		(Belgium) K.V. Mechelen
-	DF	Nicolas Hoydonckx	29 December 1900 (aged 27)		(Belgium) Berchem Sport
-	DF	Jules Lavigne	10 March 1901 (aged 27)		(Belgium) Racing Club de Bruxelles
-	FW	Jacques Moeschal	6 September 1900 (aged 27)		(Belgium) Racing Club de Bruxelles
-	DF	August Ruyssevelt	4 November 1896 (aged 31)		(Belgium) Beerschot
-	MF	Henri Van Averbeke	26 October 1901 (aged 26)		(Belgium) K. Beerschot V.A.C.
-	MF	Florimond Vanhalme	21 March 1895 (aged 33)		(Belgium) Cercle Brugge
-	FW	Sébastien Verhulst	19 February 1907 (aged 21)		(Belgium) Beerschot
-	FW	Louis Versyp	5 December 1908 (aged 19)		(Belgium) Club Brugge
-	FW	Bernard Voorhoof	10 May 1910 (aged 18)		(Belgium) Lierse S.K.

== Chile ==
Head coach: (England) Frank Powell

No.	Pos.	Player	Date of birth (age)	Caps	Club
-	FW	Oscar Alfaro Saavedra			(Chile) San Luis Quillota
-	FW	Manuel Bravo Paredes	17 February 1897 (aged 31)		(Chile) Santiago Wanderers
-	FW	Alejandro Carbonell			(Chile) Valparaíso Ferroviarios
-	DF	Ernesto Chaparro	4 January 1901 (aged 27)		(Chile) Colo-Colo
-	MF	Humberto Contreras Canales			(Chile) Unión Española
-	GK	Roberto Cortés	2 February 1905 (aged 23)		(Chile) Colo-Colo
-	FW	José Arias			(Chile) The Comercial, city Talcahuano
-	GK	Juan Ibacache Pizarro			(Chile) Carioca FC Valparaíso
-	DF	Jorge Linford			(Chile) Colo-Colo
-	DF	Víctor Morales Sálas	10 May 1905 (aged 23)		(Chile) Colo-Colo
-	FW	José Miguel Olguin			(Chile) Colo-Colo
-	MF	Germán Reyes	20 November 1902 (aged 25)		(Chile) Colo-Colo
-	DF	Guillermo Riveros	10 February 1902 (aged 26)		(Chile) La Cruz FC city Quillota
-	MF	Guillermo Saavedra Tapia	5 November 1903 (aged 24)		(Chile) Colo-Colo
-	FW	Carlos Schneeberger	21 June 1902 (aged 25)		(Chile) Colo-Colo
-	FW	Guillermo Subiabre	25 February 1903 (aged 25)		(Chile) Colo-Colo
-	MF	Arturo Torres	20 October 1906 (aged 21)		(Chile) Everton de Viña del Mar
-	MF	Francisco Arellano			(Chile)

== Egypt ==
Head coach: Valerian Bezveconnîi, aka "Valer-Bei"?

No.	Pos.	Player	Date of birth (age)	Caps	Club
-	DF	Sayed Abaza			(Egypt) Zamalek
-	DF	Sid Ahmed			(Egypt)
-	FW	Moussa El-Ezam			(Egypt)
-	MF	Ali El-Hassani	1897		(Egypt) Zamalek
-	FW	Ismail El-Sayed Hooda "Ismail I"	1900		(Egypt) Al Ittihad Alexandria Club
-	MF	Gaber El-Soury			(Egypt) Al Ittihad Alexandria Club
-	FW	Gamil El-Zobair			(Egypt) Al Ahly
-	DF	Mohamed Gamal			(Egypt)
-	FW	Mohamed Shemais			(Egypt)
-	GK	Abdel Hamid Hamdi			(Egypt) Zamalek
-	MF	Abdel Halim Hassan			(Egypt) Al-Masry SC
-	MF	Mohamed Hassan			(Egypt)
-	FW	Mahmoud Ismail Hooda "Ismail II"	1899		(Egypt) Al Ittihad Alexandria Club
-	MF	Ahmed Mansour			(Egypt)
-	FW	Mahmoud Mokhtar El-Tetsh	23 December 1907 (aged 20)		(Egypt) Al Ahly
-	FW	Ali Mohamed Riad	1904		(Egypt) Zamalek
-	GK	Mohamed Ali Rostam			(Egypt) El Sekka El Hadid SC
-	DF	Ahmed Salem			(Egypt) Zamalek
-	FW	Mahmoud Salem			(Egypt)
-	MF	Ahmed Soliman			(Egypt) Al Ahly
-	FW	Ahmed Mokhtar			(Egypt) Al Ahly

== France ==
Head coach: (Scotland) Peter Farmer

No.	Pos.	Player	Date of birth (age)	Caps	Club
-	MF	Maurice Banide	19 May 1905 (aged 23)		(France) RC Strasbourg
-	FW	Charles Bardot	7 April 1904 (aged 24)		(France) AS Cannes
-	DF	Marcel Bertrand	1899		(France) Club Français
-	MF	Juste Brouzes	18 January 1894 (aged 34)		(France) Red Star
-	DF	Jacques Canthelou	29 March 1904 (aged 24)		(France) FC Rouen
-	MF	Augustin Chantrel	11 November 1906 (aged 21)		(France) Red Star
-	MF	Robert Dauphin	5 February 1905 (aged 23)		(France) Stade Français
-	FW	Jules Dewaquez	9 March 1899 (aged 29)		(France) Marseille
-	MF	Marcel Domergue	16 November 1901 (aged 26)		(France) Red Star
-	DF	Maurice Gourdon			(France) Stade Français
-	GK	Laurent Henric	20 March 1905 (aged 23)		(France) FC Sète
-	FW	Marcel Langiller	2 June 1908 (aged 19)		(France) CA Paris
-	MF	Lucien Laurent	10 December 1907 (aged 20)		(France) CA Paris
-	MF	Jacques Mairesse	27 February 1905 (aged 23)		(France) FC Sète
-	MF	Hervé Marc			(France) Stade Rennais FC
-	FW	Jules Monsallier	23 January 1907 (aged 21)		(France) Red Star Olympique
-	FW	Paul Nicolas	4 November 1899 (aged 28)		(France) Red Star
-	MF	Henri Pavillard	15 August 1905 (aged 22)		(France) Stade Français
-	GK	Alex Thépot	30 July 1906 (aged 21)		(France) FEC Levallois
-	MF	Alexandre Villaplane	12 September 1905 (aged 22)		(France) SC Nîmes
-	MF	Jacques Wild	1905		(France) Stade Français
-	DF	Urbain Wallet	4 July 1899 (aged 28)		(France) Amiens AC

== Germany ==
Head coach: Otto Nerz

No.	Pos.	Player	Date of birth (age)	Caps	Club
-	FW	Ernst Albrecht	12 November 1907 (aged 20)		(Germany) Fortuna Düsseldorf
-	DF	Albert Beier	28 September 1900 (aged 27)		(Germany) Hamburger SV
-	GK	Paul Gehlhaar	27 August 1905 (aged 22)		(Germany) VfB Königsberg
-	MF	Hans Gruber	4 June 1905 (aged 22)		(Germany) Duisburger SV
-	DF	Conrad Heidkamp	27 September 1905 (aged 22)		(Germany) SC 99 Düsseldorf
-	FW	Ludwig Hofmann	9 June 1900 (aged 27)		(Germany) Bayern Munich
-	FW	Richard Hofmann	8 February 1906 (aged 22)		(Germany) SpVgg Meerane 07
-	FW	Franz Horn	26 August 1904 (aged 23)		(Germany) Hamburger SV
-	FW	Josef Hornauer	14 January 1908 (aged 20)		(Germany) 1860 Munich
-	MF	Hans Kalb	3 August 1899 (aged 28)		(Germany) 1. FC Nürnberg
-	MF	Georg Knöpfle	15 May 1904 (aged 24)		(Germany) SpVgg Fürth
-	DF	Emil Kutterer	11 November 1898 (aged 29)		(Germany) Bayern Munich
-	FW	Ernst Kuzorra	16 October 1905 (aged 22)		(Germany) FC Schalke 04
-	MF	Ludwig Leinberger	21 May 1903 (aged 25)		(Germany) SpVgg Fürth
-	MF	Josef Müller	8 May 1893 (aged 35)		(Germany) 1. Würzburger FV 04
-	MF	Ernst Nagelschmitz	1 May 1902 (aged 26)		(Germany) Bayern Munich
-	FW	Josef Pöttinger	16 April 1903 (aged 25)		(Germany) Bayern Munich
-	MF	Baptist Reinmann	31 October 1903 (aged 24)		(Germany) 1. FC Nürnberg
-	FW	Josef Schmitt	21 March 1908 (aged 20)		(Germany) 1. FC Nürnberg
-	GK	Heinrich Stuhlfauth	11 January 1896 (aged 32)		(Germany) 1. FC Nürnberg
-	DF	Heinrich Weber	21 June 1900 (aged 27)		(Germany) SV Kurhessen Kassel
-	GK	Hans Wentorf	6 April 1899 (aged 29)		(Germany) Altonaer FC von 1893

== Italy ==
Head coach: Augusto Rangone

No.	Pos.	Player	Date of birth (age)	Caps	Club
-	MF	Adolfo Baloncieri	27 July 1897 (aged 30)		(Italy) Torino FC
-	FW	Elvio Banchero	28 April 1904 (aged 24)		(Italy) Alessandria U.S.
-	DF	Delfo Bellini	13 January 1900 (aged 28)		(Italy) Genoa C.F.C.
-	MF	Fulvio Bernardini	28 December 1905 (aged 22)		(Italy) F.C. Internazionale
-	DF	Umberto Caligaris	26 July 1901 (aged 26)		(Italy) Casale FBC XI Legione
-	GK	Giampiero Combi	20 November 1902 (aged 25)		(Italy) Juventus FC
-	GK	Valentino Degani	14 February 1905 (aged 23)		(Italy) F.C. Internazionale
-	GK	Giovanni De Prà	28 June 1900 (aged 27)		(Italy) Genoa C.F.C.
-	MF	Attilio Ferraris	26 March 1904 (aged 24)		(Italy) AS Roma
-	DF	Felice Gasperi	26 December 1903 (aged 24)		(Italy) Bologna Sportiva
-	MF	Pietro Genovesi	27 June 1902 (aged 25)		(Italy) Bologna Sportiva
-	MF	Antonio Janni	19 September 1904 (aged 23)		(Italy) Torino FC
-	FW	Virgilio Levratto	26 October 1904 (aged 23)		(Italy) Genoa C.F.C.
-	MF	Mario Magnozzi	20 March 1902 (aged 26)		(Italy) U.S. Livorno
-	FW	Pietro Pastore	3 April 1903 (aged 25)		(Italy) AC Milan
-	DF	Silvio Pietroboni	9 March 1904 (aged 24)		(Italy) F.C. Internazionale
-	MF	Alfredo Pitto	26 May 1906 (aged 22)		(Italy) Bologna Sportiva
-	MF	Enrico Rivolta	29 June 1905 (aged 22)		(Italy) F.C. Internazionale
-	DF	Virginio Rosetta	25 February 1902 (aged 26)		(Italy) Juventus FC
-	MF	Gino Rossetti	7 November 1904 (aged 23)		(Italy) Torino FC
-	FW	Angelo Schiavio	15 October 1905 (aged 22)		(Italy) Bologna Sportiva
-	FW	Andrea Viviano	22 June 1904 (aged 23)		(Italy) Alessandria U.S.

== Luxembourg ==
Head coach: Gustave Jacquemart

No.	Pos.	Player	Date of birth (age)	Caps	Club
-	MF	Mathias Becker	4 February 1907 (aged 21)		(Luxembourg) Red Boys Differdange
-	DF	Paul Feierstein	27 January 1903 (aged 25)		(Luxembourg) Red Boys Differdange
-	DF	Mathias Feller	12 October 1904 (aged 23)		Spora Luxembourg
-	DF	Bernard Fischer	30 May 1902 (aged 25)		(Luxembourg) Red Boys Differdange
-	MF	Joseph Kirpes	10 July 1906 (aged 21)		(Luxembourg) Jeunesse Esch
-	DF	Nicolas Kirsch	24 August 1901 (aged 26)		Spora Luxembourg
-	DF	Joseph Koetz	29 May 1897 (aged 30)		(Luxembourg) CS Fola Esch
-	DF	Émile Kolb	3 June 1902 (aged 25)		(Luxembourg) Red Boys Differdange
-	DF	Albert Reuter	11 September 1907 (aged 20)		(Luxembourg) Red Black Pfaffenthal
-	GK	Pierre Reuter	11 April 1904 (aged 24)		(Luxembourg) Red Black Pfaffenthal
-	GK	Henri Scharry	10 December 1904 (aged 23)		(Luxembourg) Jeunesse Esch
-	FW	Guillaume Schütz	31 March 1903 (aged 25)		Union Luxembourg
-	FW	Robert Theissen	20 July 1906 (aged 21)		Spora Luxembourg
-	MF	François Weber	21 December 1899 (aged 28)		Spora Luxembourg
-	FW	Jean-Pierre Weisgerber	28 March 1905 (aged 23)		(Luxembourg) CS Fola Esch

The following players were also named as reserves, but did not play in any matches: Jean-Baptiste Meyer, N. Weisgerber, A. Voght, Adolphe Hubert, J. Michel and J. P. Flammang

== Mexico ==
Head coach: Alfonso Rojo

No.	Pos.	Player	Date of birth (age)	Club
-	GK	Oscar Bonfiglio	5 October 1905 (aged 22)	(Mexican Football Federation) Marte FC
-	FW	Juan Carreño	14 August 1907 (aged 20)	(Mexican Football Federation) Atlante F.C.
-	DF	Hesiquio Cerilla		(Mexican Football Federation) Club América
-	MF	Luis Cerrilla	1 February 1906 (aged 22)	(Mexican Football Federation) Club América
-	FW	Benito Contreras	16 May 1905 (aged 23)	(Mexican Football Federation) Club América
-	GK	Ignacio de la Garza		(Mexican Football Federation) Club América
-	FW	Carlos Garcés	24 December 1900 (aged 27)	(Mexican Football Federation) Club América
-	MF	Emmanuel Guevara	2 February 1902 (aged 26)	(Mexican Football Federation) Deportivo Mexico
-	DF	Rafael Garza	13 December 1896 (aged 31)	(Mexican Football Federation) Club América
-	MF	Nieves Hernandez	30 October 1901 (aged 26)	(Mexican Football Federation) Club América
-	FW	Adeodato López	1 February 1906 (aged 22)	(Mexican Football Federation) Germania FV
-	FW	Dionisio Mejía	6 January 1907 (aged 21)	(Mexican Football Federation) Atlante F.C.
-	DF	Agustín Ojeda	9 September 1898 (aged 29)	(Mexican Football Federation) Marte FC
-	MF	Fernando Rojas		(Mexican Football Federation) Atlante F.C.
-	FW	Ernesto Sota	11 December 1896 (aged 31)	(Mexican Football Federation) Club América
-	MF	Pedro Suinaga	5 April 1907 (aged 21)	(Mexican Football Federation) Club América
-	FW	Juan Terrazas	5 December 1909 (aged 18)	(Mexican Football Federation) Club América

== Netherlands ==
Head coach: (England) Bob Glendenning

No.	Pos.	Player	Date of birth (age)	Caps	Club
-	GK	Jan de Boer	29 August 1898 (aged 29)	4 (0)	(Netherlands) Ajax
-	MF	Piet van Boxtel	6 October 1902 (aged 25)	6 (0)	(Netherlands) NAC
-	FW	Wout Buitenweg	24 December 1893 (aged 34)	10 (14)	(Netherlands) Hercules
-	DF	Harry Dénis	28 August 1896 (aged 31)	48 (0)	(Netherlands) HBS
-	FW	Jan Elfring	8 February 1902 (aged 26)	10 (2)	(Netherlands) Alcmaria Victrix
-	FW	Bertus Freese	20 February 1902 (aged 26)	0 (0)	(Netherlands) Heracles Almelo
-	FW	Leo Ghering	19 August 1900 (aged 27)	4 (4)	(Netherlands) LONGA
-	FW	Jaap van der Griend	24 January 1904 (aged 24)	2 (0)	(Netherlands) Hermes DVS
-	MF	Puck van Heel	21 January 1904 (aged 24)	13 (0)	(Netherlands) Feijenoord
-	DF	Dolf van Kol	2 August 1902 (aged 25)	15 (0)	(Netherlands) Ajax
-	MF	Cor Kools	20 July 1907 (aged 20)	2 (1)	(Netherlands) NAC
-	MF	Peer Krom	10 March 1898 (aged 30)	12 (1)	(Netherlands) RCH
-	MF	Pierre Massy	3 February 1900 (aged 28)	11 (3)	(Netherlands) Roermond
-	GK	Gejus van der Meulen	23 January 1903 (aged 25)	25 (0)	(Netherlands) HFC
-	DF	Sjef van Run	12 January 1904 (aged 24)	0 (0)	(Netherlands) PSV
-	MF	Frits Schipper	24 December 1904 (aged 23)	1 (0)	(Netherlands) Heracles Almelo
-	MF	Harry Schreurs	11 December 1901 (aged 26)	2 (0)	(Netherlands) Roermond
-	FW	Felix Smeets	29 April 1904 (aged 24)	7 (3)	(Netherlands) HBS
-	FW	Wim Tap	3 October 1903 (aged 24)	17 (11)	(Netherlands) ADO
-	FW	Rens Vis	4 July 1904 (aged 23)	1 (0)	(Netherlands) HVV Den Haag
-	FW	Jaap Weber	4 August 1901 (aged 26)	9 (1)	(Netherlands) Sparta
-	MF	Kees van der Zalm	30 September 1901 (aged 26)	1 (0)	(Netherlands) VUC

== Portugal ==
Head coach: Cândido de Oliveira

No.	Pos.	Player	Date of birth (age)	Caps	Goals	Club
-	DF	Carlos Alves	10 October 1903 (aged 24)	4	0	(Portuguese Football Federation) Carcavelinhos
-	DF	Óscar de Carvalho	22 December 1903 (aged 24)	0	0	(Portuguese Football Federation) Boavista
-	MF	César de Matos	22 February 1902 (aged 26)	9	0	(Portuguese Football Federation) Belenenses
-	FW	Liberto dos Santos	1 February 1908 (aged 20)	4	0	(Portuguese Football Federation) União de Lisboa
-	MF	Anibal José	29 March 1904 (aged 24)	0	0	(Portuguese Football Federation) Vitória de Setúbal
-	FW	Armando Martins	4 March 1905 (aged 23)	3	1	(Portuguese Football Federation) Vitória de Setúbal
-	FW	José Martins	2 September 1906 (aged 21)	7	4	(Portuguese Football Federation) Sporting CP
-	FW	Valdemar Mota	18 March 1906 (aged 22)	4	3	(Portuguese Football Federation) Porto
-	FW	Pepe	30 January 1908 (aged 20)	5	2	(Portuguese Football Federation) Belenenses
-	FW	Alfredo Ramos	15 February 1906 (aged 22)	2	0	(Portuguese Football Federation) Belenenses
-	GK	António Roquete	8 August 1906 (aged 21)	5	0	(Portuguese Football Federation) Casa Pia
-	GK	Cipriano Santos	13 October 1901 (aged 26)	1	0	(Portuguese Football Federation) Sporting CP
-	FW	João Santos	11 February 1909 (aged 19)	6	3	(Portuguese Football Federation) Vitória de Setúbal
-	MF	Augusto Silva	22 March 1902 (aged 26)	9	1	(Portuguese Football Federation) Belenenses
-	FW	Vítor Silva	20 February 1909 (aged 19)	4	1	(Portuguese Football Federation) Benfica
-	MF	Tamanqueiro	22 January 1903 (aged 25)	8	0	(Portuguese Football Federation) Benfica
-	FW	Jorge Tavares	21 January 1905 (aged 23)	1	0	(Portuguese Football Federation) Benfica
-	DF	Jorge Vieira (c)	23 February 1898 (aged 30)	12	0	(Portuguese Football Federation) Sporting CP

The following players were also named as reserves, but did not play in any matches: Francisco Silva, Francisco Moura and José João Soares

== Spain ==
Head coach: José Ángel Berraondo

No.	Pos.	Player	Date of birth (age)	Caps	Club
-	MF	Trino Arizcorreta	1 September 1902 (aged 25)		(Spain) Real Sociedad
-	FW	Francisco Bienzobas	26 March 1909 (aged 19)		(Spain) Real Sociedad
-	FW	Cholín	13 December 1906 (aged 21)		(Spain) Real Sociedad
-	DF	Ciriaco Errasti	8 August 1904 (aged 23)		(Spain) Deportivo Alavés
-	MF	Francisco Gamborena	14 March 1901 (aged 27)		(Spain) Real Unión
-	MF	Antero González	1 February 1901 (aged 27)		(Spain) Deportivo Alavés
-	GK	Jesús Izaguirre	13 April 1906 (aged 22)		(Spain) Real Sociedad
-	GK	José María Jáuregui	15 March 1896 (aged 32)		(Spain) Arenas Club de Getxo
-	FW	Kiriki	21 June 1907 (aged 20)		(Spain) Real Sociedad
-	MF	Amadeo Labarta	31 March 1905 (aged 23)		(Spain) Real Sociedad
-	MF	José Legarreta Abaitua	12 February 1903 (aged 25)		(Spain) Athletic Bilbao
-	MF	Martín Marculeta	24 September 1907 (aged 20)		(Spain) Real Sociedad
-	FW	Ángel Mariscal	11 August 1904 (aged 23)		(Spain) Real Sociedad
-	DF	Jacinto Quincoces	17 July 1905 (aged 22)		(Spain) Deportivo Alavés
-	MF	Luis Regueiro	1 July 1908 (aged 19)		(Spain) Real Unión
-	FW	Robus	18 December 1900 (aged 27)		(Spain) Arenas Club de Getxo
-	FW	Manuel Sagarzazu	15 October 1903 (aged 24)		(Spain) Real Unión
-	DF	Pedro Vallana	29 November 1897 (aged 30)		(Spain) Arenas Club de Getxo
-	MF	Alberto Villaverde	7 July 1904 (aged 23)		(Spain) Real Unión
-	FW	José María Yermo	21 June 1903 (aged 24)		(Spain) Arenas Club de Getxo
-	DF	Domingo Zaldúa	10 July 1903 (aged 24)		(Spain) Real Sociedad

Juan Errazquin was rejected by the organizing citizens committee because his passport listed born in Argentina and had no documents to prove his Spanish nationality.

== Switzerland ==
Head coach: (England) Teddy Duckworth

No.	Pos.	Player	Date of birth (age)	Caps	Club
-	FW	Max Abegglen	11 April 1902 (aged 26)		(Switzerland) Grasshopper Club Zürich
-	FW	Edmond Bailly			(Switzerland) Servette Genève
-	DF	Max Baltensberger			(Switzerland) Servette Genève
-	DF	Karl Bielser			(Switzerland) FC Basel
-	FW	Max Brand			(Switzerland) FC Bern
-	MF	Paul de Lavallaz	1900		(Switzerland) Grasshopper Club Zürich
-	DF	Edmond De Weck	28 April 1901 (aged 27)		(Switzerland) Grasshopper Club Zürich
-	MF	Walter Dietrich	24 December 1902 (aged 25)		(Germany) Eintracht Frankfurt
-	DF	Jean Facchinetti			(Switzerland) Cantonal Neuchâtel
-	MF	Paul Fässler	13 June 1901 (aged 26)		(Switzerland) BSC Young Boys
-	FW	Adolf Flubacher			(Switzerland) FC Nordstern
-	GK	Fritz Grüneisen			(Switzerland) FC Nordstern
-	MF	Willy Jäggi	28 July 1906 (aged 21)		(Switzerland) Servette Genève
-	MF	Walter Jäggi			(Switzerland) Servette Genève
-	FW	Raymond Passello	12 January 1905 (aged 23)		(Switzerland) Servette Genève
-	MF	Kurt Pichler	18 April 1898 (aged 30)		(Switzerland) Servette Genève
-	DF	Rudolf Ramseyer	17 September 1897 (aged 30)		(Switzerland) FC Bern
-	FW	Jacques Romberg			(Switzerland) FC Aarau
-	GK	Frank Séchehaye	3 November 1907 (aged 20)		(Switzerland) Etoile Carouge
-	FW	Paul Sturzenegger	7 June 1902 (aged 25)		(Switzerland) AC Lugano
-	FW	Gaston Tschirren	1906		(Switzerland) Grasshopper Club Zürich
-	DF	Walter Weiler	4 December 1903 (aged 24)		(Switzerland) Grasshopper Club Zürich

== Turkey ==
Head coach: (Hungary) Béla Tóth

No.	Pos.	Player	Date of birth (age)	Caps	Club
1	GK	Ulvi Yenal	10 April 1908 (aged 20)	5 (0)	(Turkey) Galatasaray S.K.
2	DF	Kadri Göktulga	1904	11 (0)	(Turkey) Fenerbahçe S.K.
3	DF	Burhan Atak	27 January 1905 (aged 23)	5 (1)	(Turkey) Galatasaray S.K.
4	MF	Cevat Seyit	1906	3 (0)	(Turkey) Fenerbahçe S.K.
5	MF	Nihat Bekdik	1901	15 (1)	(Turkey) Galatasaray S.K.
6	MF	İsmet Uluğ	1901	10 (0)	(Turkey) Fenerbahçe S.K.
7	FW	Mehmet Leblebi	1908	14 (2)	(Turkey) Galatasaray S.K.
8	FW	Alaattin Baydar	1901	15 (1)	(Turkey) Fenerbahçe S.K.
9	FW	Zeki Rıza Sporel	28 February 1898 (aged 30)	13 (15)	(Turkey) Fenerbahçe S.K.
10	FW	Bekir Refet	22 May 1899 (aged 29)	2 (2)	(Turkey) Fenerbahçe S.K.
11	FW	Muslih Peykoğlu	20 October 1905 (aged 22)	7 (1)	(Turkey) Galatasaray S.K.
12	FW	Kemal Faruki	1906	3 (2)	(Turkey) Galatasaray S.K.
13	FW	Bedri Gürsoy	1902	12 (1)	(Turkey) Fenerbahçe S.K.
14	DF	İzmirli Şevki			(Turkey)
15	FW	Sabih Arca	1901	9 (3)	(Turkey) Fenerbahçe S.K.
16	DF	Nafiz Orhun		0 (0)	(Turkey)
17	MF	Baron Feyzi		1 (0)	(Turkey) Altınordu S.K.
18	GK	Osman Kaptan		0 (0)	(Turkey) Beşiktaş J.K.
19	FW	Latif Yalınlı	1906	3 (3)	(Turkey) Galatasaray S.K.
20	MF	Şükrü Erkuş			(Turkey)

== Uruguay ==
Head coach: Primo Gianotti

No.	Pos.	Player	Date of birth (age)	Caps	Club
23	MF	José Andrade	22 November 1901 (aged 26)		(Uruguay) Nacional
14	FW	Peregrino Anselmo	30 April 1902 (aged 26)		(Uruguay) Peñarol
3	DF	Pedro Arispe	30 September 1900 (aged 27)		(Uruguay) Rampla Juniors
17	FW	Juan Arremón	8 February 1899 (aged 29)		(Uruguay) Peñarol
16	FW	Venancio Bartibás			(Uruguay) Central Español
12	GK	Fausto Batignani	2 July 1903 (aged 24)		(Uruguay) Liverpool
19	FW	René Borjas	23 December 1897 (aged 30)		(Uruguay) Montevideo Wanderers
11	FW	Antonio Campolo	7 February 1897 (aged 31)		(Uruguay) Peñarol
22	DF	Adhemar Canavesi	18 August 1903 (aged 24)		(Uruguay) Bella Vista
18	FW	Héctor Castro	29 November 1904 (aged 23)		(Uruguay) Nacional
10	FW	Pedro Cea	1 September 1900 (aged 27)		(Uruguay) Nacional
5	MF	Lorenzo Fernández	20 May 1900 (aged 28)		(Uruguay) Capurro
20	FW	Roberto Figueroa	20 March 1906 (aged 22)		(Uruguay) Montevideo Wanderers
6	MF	Álvaro Gestido	17 May 1907 (aged 21)		(Uruguay) Peñarol
1	GK	Andrés Mazali	22 July 1902 (aged 25)		(Uruguay) Nacional
21	MF	Ángel Melogno	22 March 1905 (aged 23)		(Uruguay) Bella Vista
2	DF	José Nasazzi (c)	24 May 1901 (aged 27)		(Uruguay) Bella Vista
9	FW	Pedro Petrone	11 May 1905 (aged 23)		(Uruguay) Nacional
15	MF	Juan Piriz	17 May 1902 (aged 26)		(Uruguay) Nacional
8	FW	Héctor Scarone	26 November 1898 (aged 29)		(Uruguay) Nacional
13	DF	Domingo Tejera	22 July 1899 (aged 28)		(Uruguay) Montevideo Wanderers
7	FW	Santos Urdinarán	30 March 1900 (aged 28)		(Uruguay) Nacional

As José Leandro Andrade refused to travel,(N°4) Eduardo Martínez FW was named as his substitute. However, at last hour (when the boat had already started the journey) Andrade joined his old partners. Martínez did travel, but wasn't filmed in the Tournament list. From then he was known as "El Olímpico 23" (the 23rd Olympian).

== United States ==
Head coach: George Burford

No.	Pos.	Player	Date of birth (age)	Caps	Club
-	MF	Robert Aitken	19 October 1904 (aged 23)		(United States) Caledonian F.C. (N.J.)
-	FW	Henry O'Carroll	12 July 1905 (aged 22)		(United States) Bayonne Rovers
-	GK	Albert Cooper	23 February 1904 (aged 24)		(United States) Trenton F.C.
-	MF	James Cronin	24 August 1906 (aged 21)	0	(United States) Angelicas St. Louis
-	FW	John Deal	5 April 1905 (aged 23)		(United States) Wolfenden Shore
-	DF	John Duffy	6 September 1905 (aged 22)		(United States) Newark Skeeters
-	FW	William Findlay	15 January 1904 (aged 24)		(United States) Galicia F.C.
-	MF	James Gallagher	8 June 1905 (aged 22)		(United States) Ryerson Juniors
-	MF	John Kane			(United States) St. Thomas Aquinus
-	FW	Rudy Kuntner	10 June 1908 (aged 19)		(United States) New York Giants
-	FW	Raymond Littley	1 September 1900 (aged 27)		(United States) Centennial A.C.
-	DF	John Lyons	19 May 1901 (aged 27)		(United States) Fore River Shamrocks
-	FW	Joseph Murphy			(United States) St. Matthews
-	MF	John Rudge			(United States) Geraghtys St. Louis
-	FW	Francis Ryan	10 January 1908 (aged 20)		(United States) Lighthouse Boys Club
-	DF	Harry Smith	14 March 1907 (aged 21)		(United States) Lighthouse Boys Club

== Yugoslavia ==
Head coach: Ante Pandaković

No.	Pos.	Player	Date of birth (age)	Caps	Club
-	DF	Milorad Arsenijević	6 June 1906 (aged 21)		(Kingdom of Yugoslavia) BSK Belgrade
-	FW	Nikola Babić	5 December 1905 (aged 22)		(Kingdom of Yugoslavia) HAŠK Zagreb
-	FW	Ivan Bek	29 October 1909 (aged 18)		(Kingdom of Yugoslavia) BSK Belgrade
-	FW	Miloš Beleslin	8 September 1901 (aged 26)		(Kingdom of Yugoslavia) SAND Subotica
-	FW	Ljubomir Benčić	2 January 1905 (aged 23)		(Kingdom of Yugoslavia) Hajduk Split
-	MF	Mirko Bonačić	9 March 1903 (aged 25)		(Kingdom of Yugoslavia) Hajduk Split
-	FW	Slavin Cindrić	10 August 1901 (aged 26)		(Kingdom of Yugoslavia) Građanski Zagreb
-	DF	Ljubiša Đorđević	19 June 1906 (aged 21)		(Kingdom of Yugoslavia) BSK Belgrade
-	MF	Franjo Giler	1 September 1907 (aged 20)		(Kingdom of Yugoslavia) Građanski Zagreb
-	DF	Milutin Ivković	3 March 1906 (aged 22)		(Kingdom of Yugoslavia) Jugoslavija Belgrade
-	DF	Blagoje Marjanovic	9 September 1907 (aged 20)		(Kingdom of Yugoslavia) BSK Belgrade
-	DF	Mare Marjanović	1904		(Kingdom of Yugoslavia) HAŠK Zagreb
-	GK	Maksimilijan Mihelčić	29 July 1905 (aged 22)		(Kingdom of Yugoslavia) Građanski Zagreb
-	DF	Milorad Mitrović	12 April 1908 (aged 20)		(Kingdom of Yugoslavia) BSK Belgrade
-	FW	Emil Perška	20 June 1896 (aged 31)		(Kingdom of Yugoslavia) Građanski Zagreb
-	DF	Danijel Premerl	23 January 1904 (aged 24)		(Kingdom of Yugoslavia) HAŠK Zagreb
-	GK	Geza Šifliš	25 February 1907 (aged 21)		(Kingdom of Yugoslavia) SAND Subotica
-	FW	Kuzman Sotirović	16 October 1908 (aged 19)		(Kingdom of Yugoslavia) BSK Belgrade

== Exogenous links ==
- FIFA
- RSSSF
- List of Luxembourgian olympic footballers at ALO
- Turkey national football team: match reports 1927-1928, Walter Verani, Erdinç Sivritepe and Turkish Soccer
- Match report at FFF
- Match report at Serbian football federation
- Argentina squad at AFA
- A list of Portuguese international footballers
