= Grüneisen =

Grüneisen or Gruneisen is a surname, meaning "green iron" in German. Notable people with the surname include:

- Charles Lewis Gruneisen (1806–1879), English journalist and music critic
- Eduard Grüneisen (1877–1949), German physicist
- Fritz Grüneisen (1906–1970), Swiss football player
- Sam Gruneisen (1941–2012), American football player and coach
