= Agustín Ojeda =

Agustín Ojeda is the name of:

- Agustín Ojeda (footballer, born 1898) (died 1938), Mexican footballer
- Agustín Ojeda (footballer, born 2001), Argentine footballer
- Agustín Ojeda (footballer, born 2004), Argentine footballer
