= Francis Ryan =

American soccer player

Hun Ryan
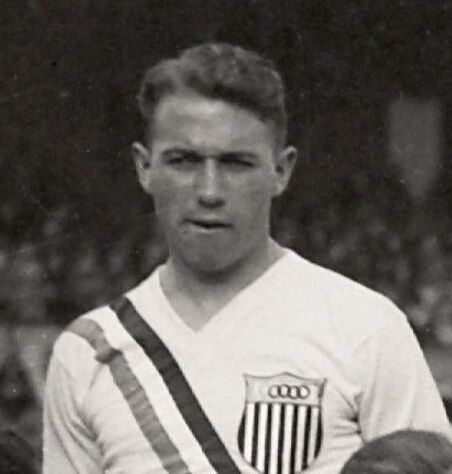

Personal information
- Full name: Francis J. Ryan
- Date of birth: January 10, 1908
- Place of birth: Philadelphia, Pennsylvania, United States
- Date of death: October 14, 1977 (aged 69)
- Place of death: Philadelphia, Pennsylvania, United States
- Height: 5 ft 6 in (1.68 m)
- Positions: Forward; midfielder

Youth career
- Lighthouse Boys Club

Senior career*
Years	Team	Apps	(Gls)
1929–1930	New York Galicia		
1930–1931	Lighthouse Boys Club		
1931–1936	Philadelphia German-Americans		

International career
1928–1936	United States	4	(1)
- * Club domestic league appearances and goals

Francis J. “Hun” Ryan (January 10, 1908 – October 14, 1977) was an American soccer player who played as a midfielder. He earned three caps, scoring one goal, with the United States national team between 1928 and 1936. He was also a member of the U.S. teams at the 1928 Summer Olympics, 1936 Summer Olympics, and the 1934 FIFA World Cup. Ryan was inducted into the National Soccer Hall of Fame in 1958.

== Playing career ==
Ryan grew up in Philadelphia, Pennsylvania, where he played soccer with Frankford High School. He also played for the Lighthouse Boys Club team. He maintained his amateur status which led to his selection to the national team at the 1928 Summer Olympics. In 1929, he signed with New York Galicia. After one season, he moved back to Lighthouse Boys Club. Once again, he spent only one season with Lighthouse before moving to the Philadelphia German-Americans in 1931. He continued with the team until at least 1936. In 1933, Philadelphia joined the American Soccer League (ASL). The German-Americans won the 1934-1935 ASL championship and the 1936 National Challenge Cup. Ryan served with the Custer Division in the U.S. Army from 1942 to 1945. Upon is return to Philadelphia, he played with the Philadelphia Nationals, leading the team to the ASL Lewis Cup in 1948-49 and 1951–52. Ryan also played with the Pennsylvania All Stars in May 1931 against Glasgow Celtic during the Scottish team's first North American tour.

== National team ==
Ryan earned his first cap on May 28, 1928, in 11–2 loss to Argentina at the 1928 Summer Olympics. Scored ten days later in a 3–3 tie with Poland in Warsaw. He did not play for the U.S. again until the 1934 FIFA World Cup when he was part of the 7–1 loss to Italy. He finished his national team career at the 1936 Summer Olympics.

In 1958, Ryan was inducted into the National Soccer Hall of Fame.
