= Alberto Helman =

Argentine footballer

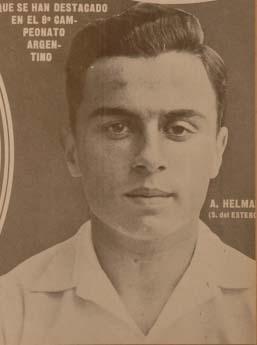
- Helman on the cover of El Gráfico in 1927

Personal information
- Date of birth: Unknown
- Place of birth: Santiago del Estero, Argentina
- Date of death: Unknown
- Position: Defender

Senior career*
Years	Team	Apps	(Gls)
- Club Atlético Estudiantes
1927	Club Atlético Mitre		
1929–1932	Sportivo Palermo		
1932–1933	Ferro Carril Oeste		

International career
1928	Argentina	0	(0)
- * Club domestic league appearances and goals

Alberto Helman, sometimes referred to as Alfredo Hellman or Alberto Hellman, was an Argentine footballer who played as a defender for several Argentinian clubs. He was a member of the Argentinian football squad that competed in the 1928 Summer Olympics in Amsterdam, but he did not play in any matches.

== Biography ==
Between 1925 and 1928, Helman, who was then a player of Club Atlético Estudiantes and later Club Atlético Mitre, played for a Santiago del Estero XI in the Argentine Interleague Championship, which involved teams representing the provincial leagues, becoming the vice-captain of the Santiago del Estero formation (Cultural League) and winning the competition's ninth edition in October 1928.

In 1928, Villaverde was called by the technical commissioner José Lago Millán to be a part of the roster of participants of the Argentine football squad that competed in the 1928 Summer Olympics in Amsterdam, but he failed to feature in a single game as Argentina reached the final which they lost to Uruguay, but he was not awarded a silver medal due to having not played.

Villaverde later joined Sportivo Palermo where in 1931 and 1932, he played in the Argentine Primera División, and then he moved to Ferro Carril Oeste, where he played two matches in the 1933 Copa de Competencia.

== Honours ==
Santiago del Estero XI

- Argentine Interleague Championship:
  - Winners: 1928
