= Jean-Baptiste Meyer =

Luxembourgish footballer

Personal information
- Date of birth: 7 April 1894
- Date of death: 26 March 1976 (aged 81)
- Position: Defender

International career
Years	Team	Apps	(Gls)
1923–1928	Luxembourg	9	(0)

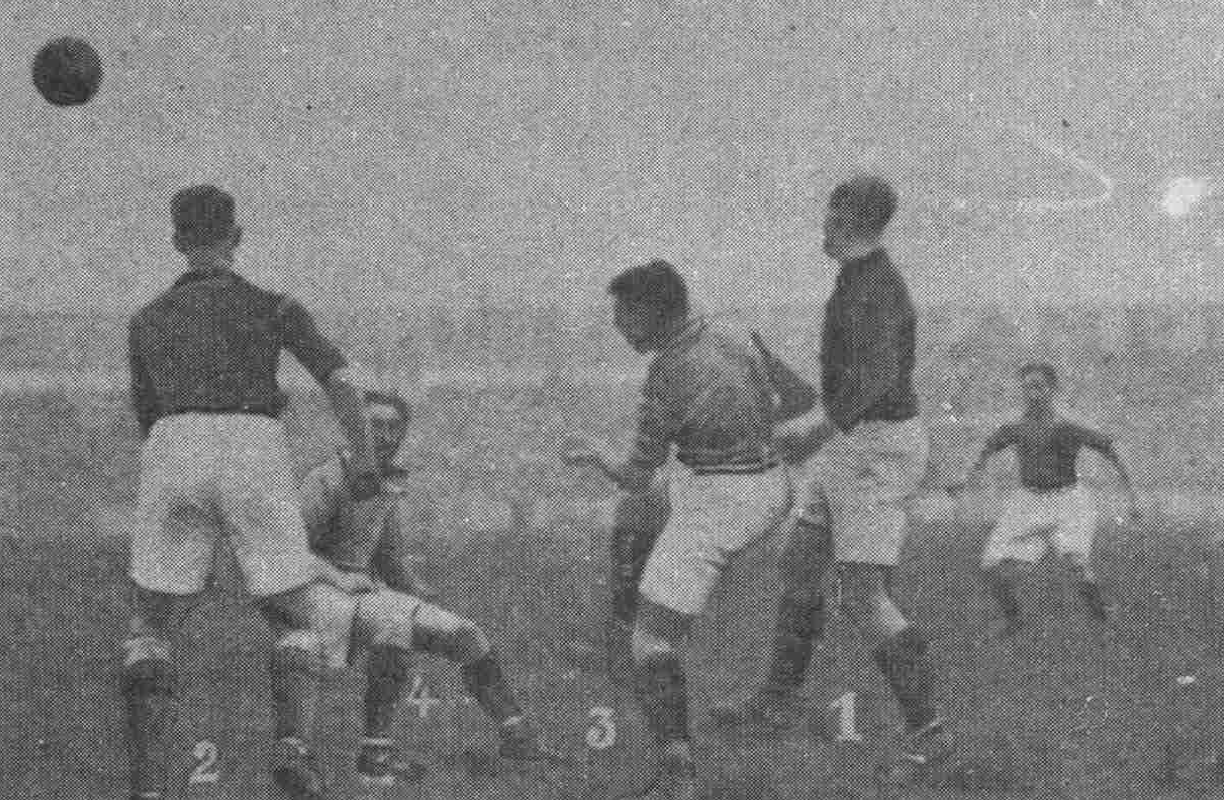
Meyer, Kolb, Rocifon, and Cordon - France-Luxembourg football match 11 November 1924

Jean-Baptiste Meyer (7 April 1894 – 26 March 1976) was a Luxembourgish footballer. He played in nine matches for the Luxembourg national football team from 1923 to 1928. He was also part of Luxembourg's squad for the football tournament at the 1928 Summer Olympics, but he did not play in any matches.
