= Max Baltensberger =

Swiss footballer

Personal information
- Position: Defender

International career
Years	Team	Apps	(Gls)
1928	Switzerland	1	(0)

Max Baltensberger was a Swiss footballer. He played in one match for the Switzerland national football team in 1928. He was also part of Switzerland's squad for the football tournament at the 1928 Summer Olympics, but he did not play in any matches.
