= Juan Terrazas =

Mexican footballer (1909-1947)

Personal information
- Date of birth: 5 December 1909
- Date of death: 4 November 1947 (aged 37)
- Position: Forward

Senior career*
Years	Team	Apps	(Gls)
- Club América

International career
1928	Mexico Olympic	1	(0)
- * Club domestic league appearances and goals

Juan Terrazas (5 December 1909 – 4 November 1947) was a Mexican footballer who represented his nation at the 1928 Summer Olympics in the Netherlands.
