= Henri Scharry =

Luxembourgish footballer

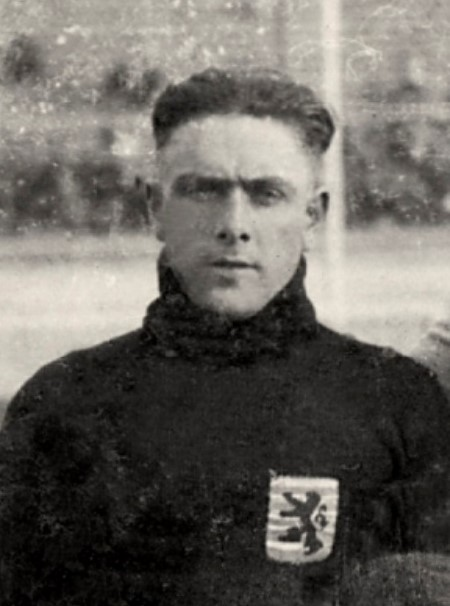
- Henri Scharry in 1928

Personal information
- Date of birth: 10 December 1904
- Place of birth: Esch-sur-Alzette, Luxembourg
- Date of death: 4 February 1954 (aged 49)
- Place of death: Esch-sur-Alzette, Luxembourg

International career
Years	Team	Apps	(Gls)
- Luxembourg

Henri Scharry (10 December 1904 – 4 February 1954) was a Luxembourgish footballer. He competed in the men's tournament at the 1928 Summer Olympics.
