= Harry Smith (soccer) =

American soccer player

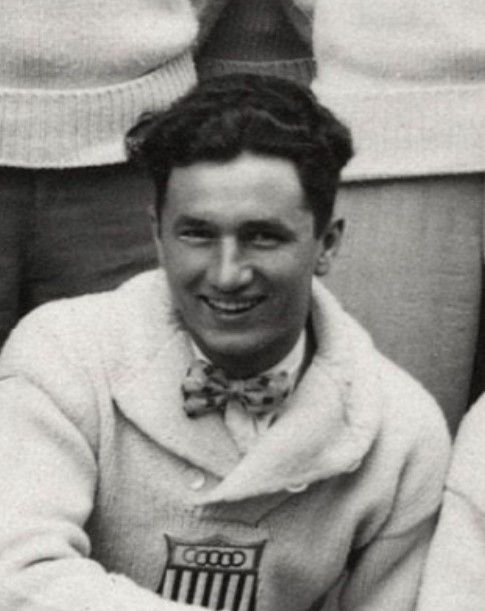
- Harry Smith in 1928

Personal information
- Full name: Harry J. A. Smith
- Date of birth: March 14, 1907
- Date of death: December 1983 (aged 76)
- Place of death: Ocean City, New Jersey, United States
- Position: Full back

Senior career*
Years	Team	Apps	(Gls)
- Lighthouse F.C.

International career
1926–1928	United States	3	(0)
- * Club domestic league appearances and goals

Harry Smith (March 14, 1907 – December 1983) was an American soccer player who played as a full back. Smith earned two caps with the United States national team in 1928. The first came at the 1928 Summer Olympics when the U.S. lost to Argentina 11–2. Following this loss, the U.S. tied Poland, 3-3, on June 10, 1928. At the time, he played for Lighthouse F.C.
