= Heinrich Weber (footballer) =

German footballer

- Weber in 1929

Personal information
- Date of birth: 21 June 1900
- Date of death: 22 January 1977 (aged 76)
- Position: Defender

Senior career*
Years	Team	Apps	(Gls)
1920–1939	SV Kurhessen Kassel		

International career
1928–1931	Germany	12	(0)
- * Club domestic league appearances and goals

Heinrich Weber (21 June 1900 – 22 January 1977) was a German international footballer.

== International career ==
Weber won 12 caps for the Germany national team in the interwar period. His first two matches for the team took place at the Summer Olympics in 1928.
