= Adolphe Hubert =

Luxembourgish footballer

Personal information
- Date of birth: 14 December 1907
- Date of death: 23 October 1969 (aged 61)
- Position: Midfielder

International career
Years	Team	Apps	(Gls)
1927–1928	Luxembourg	2	(1)

Adolphe Hubert (14 December 1907 – 23 October 1969) was a Luxembourgish footballer. He played in two matches for the Luxembourg national football team from 1927 to 1928. He was also part of Luxembourg's squad for the football tournament at the 1928 Summer Olympics, but he did not play in any matches.
