= Robert Aitken (soccer) =

American soccer player

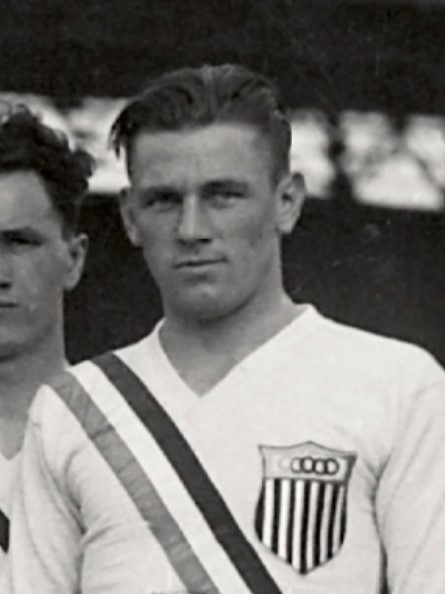
Robert Aitken in 1928

Robert Aitken Jr. (October 19, 1904 – December 20, 1962) was an American soccer player who earned two caps with the United States national team. His first came in the 11–2 loss to Argentina at the 1928 Summer Olympics. Following that game, the United States played a June 10, 1928, exhibition game with Poland. The game ended in a 3–3 tie. At the time of the Olympics, he played for Caledonian F.C.
