= Luis Cerrilla =

Mexican footballer (1906-1936)

Personal information
- Date of birth: 1 February 1906
- Place of birth: Mexico City, Mexico
- Date of death: 14 October 1936 (aged 30)

International career
Years	Team	Apps	(Gls)
- Mexico

Luis Cerrilla (1 February 1906 – 14 October 1936) was a Mexican footballer. He competed in the men's tournament at the 1928 Summer Olympics.
