= Joseph Kirpes =

Luxembourgish footballer

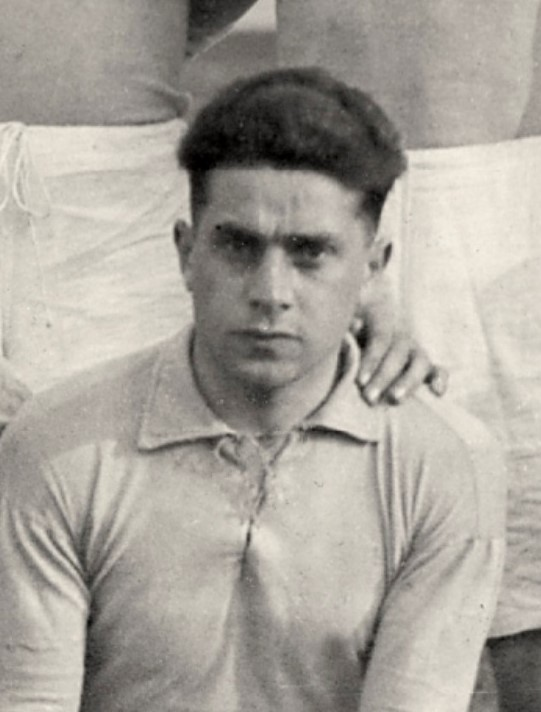
- Joseph Kirpes in 1928

Personal information
- Date of birth: 10 July 1906
- Place of birth: Esch-sur-Alzette, Luxembourg
- Date of death: 22 April 1976 (aged 69)
- Place of death: Bettembourg, Luxembourg

International career
Years	Team	Apps	(Gls)
- Luxembourg

Joseph Kirpes (10 July 1906 – 22 April 1976) was a Luxembourgish footballer. He competed in the men's tournament at the 1928 Summer Olympics.
