= Liberto dos Santos =

Portuguese footballer

Personal information
- Date of birth: 1 February 1908
- Place of birth: Portugal
- Position: Forward

Senior career*
Years	Team	Apps	(Gls)
1925–1928	União Lisboa		

International career
1926–1927	Portugal	5	(0)
- * Club domestic league appearances and goals

Liberto dos Santos (born 1 February 1908, date of death unknown) was a former Portuguese footballer who played as a forward.

== Football career ==
Liberto dos Santos gained 5 caps for Portugal and made his debut 24 January 1926 in Porto, in a 1–1 draw with Czechoslovakia. He was a non-playing member of Portugal's squad for the 1928 Football Olympic Tournament.
