= Harry Schreurs =

Dutch footballer

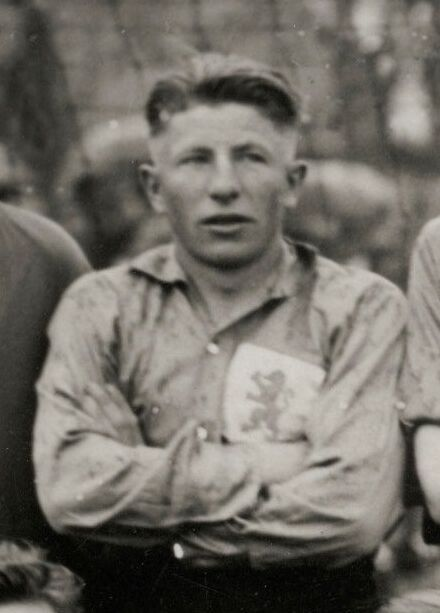
- Schreurs (1928)

Personal information
- Date of birth: 11 December 1901
- Place of birth: Roermond, Netherlands
- Date of death: 16 October 1973 (aged 71)
- Place of death: Roermond, Netherlands

International career
Years	Team	Apps	(Gls)
1928	Netherlands	2	(0)

Harry Schreurs (11 December 1901 – 16 October 1973) was a Dutch footballer. He played in two matches for the Netherlands national football team in 1928.
