= Francisco Silva (1920s footballer) =

Portuguese footballer

Personal information
- Date of birth: 23 December 1898
- Place of birth: Portugal
- Position: Defender

Senior career*
Years	Team	Apps	(Gls)
	Vitória Setúbal	92	(7)

International career
1930	Portugal	1	(0)
- * Club domestic league appearances and goals

Francisco Silva (born 23 December 1898, date of death unknown) was a Portuguese footballer who played as a defender. He was part of Portugal's squad for the 1928 Summer Olympics, but he did not play in any matches.
