= Hans Gruber (footballer) =

German footballer

Personal information
- Date of birth: 4 June 1905
- Date of death: 9 October 1967 (aged 62)
- Position: Midfielder

Senior career*
Years	Team	Apps	(Gls)
1923–1935	Duisburger SV		

International career
1929	Germany	1	(0)
- * Club domestic league appearances and goals

Hans Gruber (4 June 1905 – 9 October 1967) was a German international footballer. He was part of Germany's team at the 1928 Summer Olympics, but he did not play in any matches.
