= Agustín Ojeda (footballer, born 2001) =

Argentine footballer (born 2001)

Personal information
- Full name: Leandro Agustín Ojeda
- Date of birth: 23 July 2001 (age 25)
- Place of birth: Sáenz Peña, Chaco, Argentina
- Height: 1.77 m (5 ft 10 in)
- Position: Left-back

Team information
- Current team: Chaco For Ever (on loan from San Telmo)

Youth career
- Club Atlético Sportivo
- Escuela Los Amigos
- Rey del Norte
- –2019: Colón
- 2021–2022: Colón

Senior career*
Years	Team	Apps	(Gls)
2022–2024	Colón	9	(0)
2024–	San Telmo	29	(2)
2026–	→ Chaco For Ever (loan)	5	(0)
- * Club domestic league appearances and goals as of 18:04, 24 April 2026 (UTC)

Leandro Agustín Ojeda (born 23 July 2001) is an Argentine professional footballer who plays as a left-back for Chaco For Ever, on loan from San Telmo.

== Club career ==
=== Early career and Colón ===
Born in Sáenz Peña in the Chaco Province of Argentina, Ojeda first took at interest after his grandmother gave him a football as a gift for his first birthday. His first club in organised football was Club Atlético Sportivo, with whom he would travel to various locations across Argentina, playing in youth tournaments, and earned a trial with professional side Argentinos Juniors. He also played for local sides Escuela Los Amigos and Rey del Norte, before successfully trialling with Colón in the city of Charata.

In 2019, due to the COVID-19 pandemic in Argentina, Ojeda left Colón; as the club were unable to provide a wage or a place to live, he returned home to live with his parents. However, he returned to the club in 2021, earning a place in the reserve team as a starter, and being given an apartment by the club.

On 26 June 2022, Ojeda made his debut for Colón when he came on as a half-time substitute for Tomás Moschión in a 1–0 Argentine Primera División loss to Huracán. Following injuries to both Rafael Delgado and Andrew Teuten, Ojeda was given a run in the first team, playing five games in July 2022. He signed his first professional contract with the club the following month.

The following year, Ojeda was demoted to the reserve squad by then-manager Marcelo Saralegui, a decision which surprised fans. Seemingly in response, Ojeda posted an update to his personal Twitter account, stating: "No es momento de tirar la toalla!!" ("This is not the time to throw in the towel!!"). Following the departure of Saralegui, new manager Néstor Gorosito recalled Ojeda to the first team, and he was named on the bench for a Copa de la Liga Profesional fixture against Independiente on 18 August 2023, though he did not feature.

=== San Telmo ===
Having been demoted to the Colón reserve team by manager Marcelo Saralegui, Ojeda did not feature for the senior squad in the first half of the 2023 season. Following Saralegui's departure from the club, new manager Néstor Gorosito recalled him to the first team, though he only featured on the bench. At the conclusion of the season, he was released by the club, and went on to join Primera Nacional side San Telmo in January 2024. He failed to feature in the 2024 season, but established himself as a first-team player the following year, scoring his first goals for the club in a 3–1 Primera Nacional victory against Central Norte on 14 September 2025, netting a brace.

== Career statistics ==
=== Club ===
As of 10 November 2025.

Appearances and goals by club, season and competition
Club	Season	League			National Cup		League Cup		Continental		Other		Total	
Club	Season	Division	Apps	Goals	Apps	Goals	Apps	Goals	Apps	Goals	Apps	Goals	Apps	Goals
Colón	2022	Argentine Primera División	9	0	0	0	0	0	0	0	0	0	9	0
Colón	2023	Argentine Primera División	0	0	0	0	0	0	0	0	0	0	0	0
Colón	Total		9	0	0	0	0	0	0	0	0	0	9	0
San Telmo	2024	Primera Nacional	0	0	0	0	0	0	–		0	0	0	0
San Telmo	2025	Primera Nacional	29	2	0	0	0	0	–		0	0	29	2
San Telmo	Total		29	2	0	0	0	0	0	0	0	0	29	2
Career total			38	2	0	0	0	0	0	0	0	0	38	2
