= Guillaume Schütz =

Luxembourgish footballer

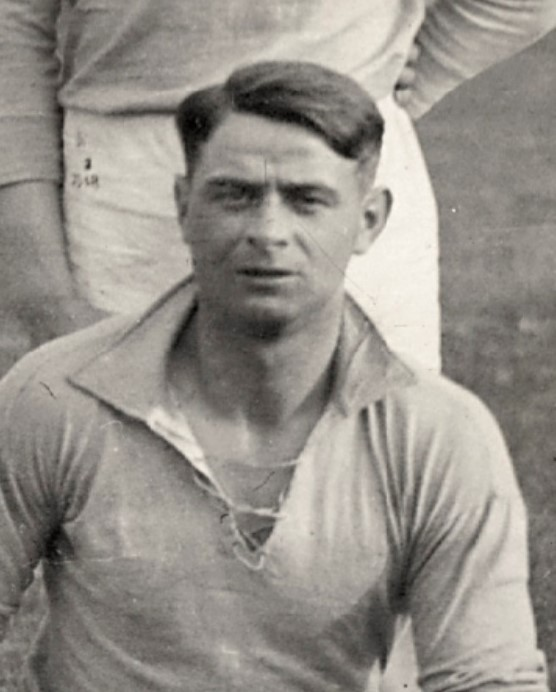
- Guillaume Schütz in 1928

Personal information
- Date of birth: 31 March 1903
- Place of birth: Luxembourg, Luxembourg
- Date of death: 26 November 1932 (aged 29)
- Place of death: Schifflange, Luxembourg

International career
Years	Team	Apps	(Gls)
- Luxembourg

Guillaume Schütz (31 March 1903 – 26 November 1932) was a Luxembourgish footballer. He competed in the men's tournament at the 1928 Summer Olympics.
