= Andrea Viviano =

Italian footballer (1904-1962)

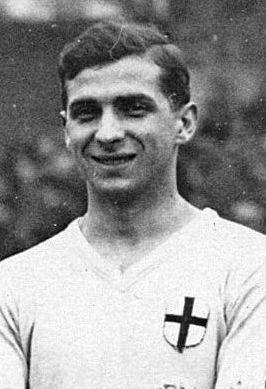

Personal information
- Date of birth: 22 June 1904
- Place of birth: Alessandria, Italy
- Date of death: 5 December 1962 (aged 58)
- Place of death: Alessandria, Italy
- Position: Defender

Senior career*
Years	Team	Apps	(Gls)
1921–1928	Alessandria	97	(6)
Medal record
Representing Italy
Summer Olympics
Bronze medal – third place	Summer Olympics	1928 Amsterdam
- * Club domestic league appearances and goals

Andrea Viviano (22 June 1904 – 5 December 1962) was an Italian footballer who played as a defender. He competed in the 1928 Summer Olympics with the Italy national team.

== Career ==
Viviano was born in Alessandria. He won the Olympic bronze medal at the 1928 Summer Olympics in the football competition with Italy, but because of a disputed game in some accounts Olympic, his name is not listed among the medal winners.

== Honours ==
=== International ===
Italy

- Olympic Bronze Medal: 1928
