= Jim Cronin (soccer) =

American soccer player 1906–1942

Personal information
- Full name: James Maurice Cronin
- Date of birth: August 24, 1906
- Place of birth: St. Louis, Missouri, U.S.
- Date of death: April 6, 1942 (aged 35)
- Place of death: Harter, Illinois, U.S.

Senior career*
Years	Team	Apps	(Gls)
- Tablers
- Andersons
- * Club domestic league appearances and goals

James Maurice Cronin (August 24, 1906 – April 6, 1942) was an American soccer player who was a member of the United States soccer team at the 1928 Summer Olympics and played in the St. Louis Soccer League.

He was a member of the U.S. soccer team at the 1928 Summer Olympics. He played for Tablers in the St. Louis Soccer League. In 1931, he moved to Andersons. Cronin died in 1942 in Harter, Illinois, aged 35.

He was inducted into the St. Louis Soccer Hall of Fame in 1978.
