= Emil Kutterer =

German footballer and manager

Personal information
- Date of birth: 11 November 1898
- Place of birth: Karlsruhe, Germany
- Date of death: 13 July 1974 (aged 75)
- Position: Defender

Youth career
- 1908–1916: FV Daxlanden
- 1916–1920: FV Beiertheim

Senior career*
Years	Team	Apps	(Gls)
1920–1922	Karlsruher FV		
1922–1931	Bayern Munich		
1931–1933	SV Wiesbaden		

International career
1925–1928	Germany	8	(0)

Managerial career
- 1932–1935: SV Wiesbaden
- 1936–1938: TuRa Leipzig
- 1939–1941: Fortuna Leipzig
- 1947–1949: SG Mainz-Gonsenheim
- 1950–1953: FV Engers
- 1953–1954: FC Singen 04
- * Club domestic league appearances and goals

Emil Kutterer (11 November 1898 – 13 July 1974) was a German footballer. He was part of Germany's team at the 1928 Summer Olympics, but he did not play in any matches.
