= Robert Dauphin =

French footballer (1905–1961)

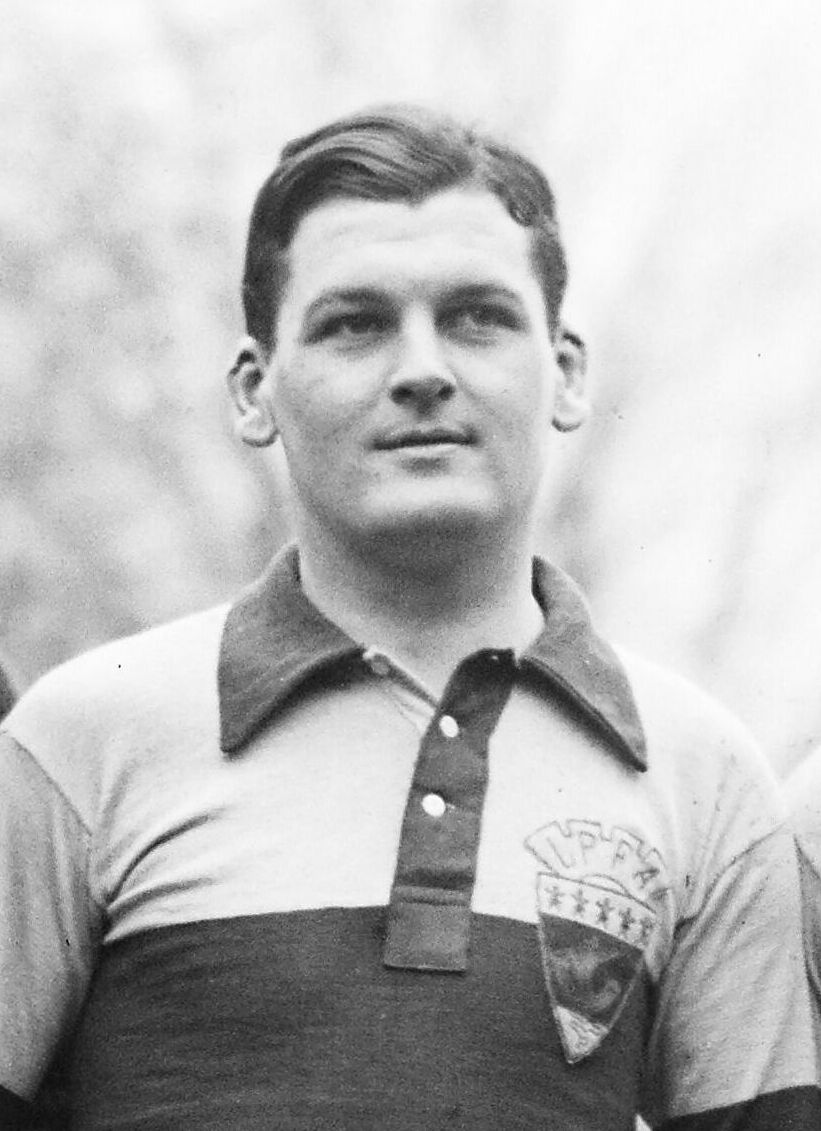

Personal information
- Date of birth: 5 February 1905
- Place of birth: Saint-Malo, France
- Date of death: 18 July 1961 (aged 56)
- Place of death: Saint-Malo, France

International career
Years	Team	Apps	(Gls)
- France

Robert Dauphin (5 February 1905 – 18 July 1961) was a French footballer. He competed in the men's tournament at the 1928 Summer Olympics.
