= Pierre Massy =

Dutch footballer

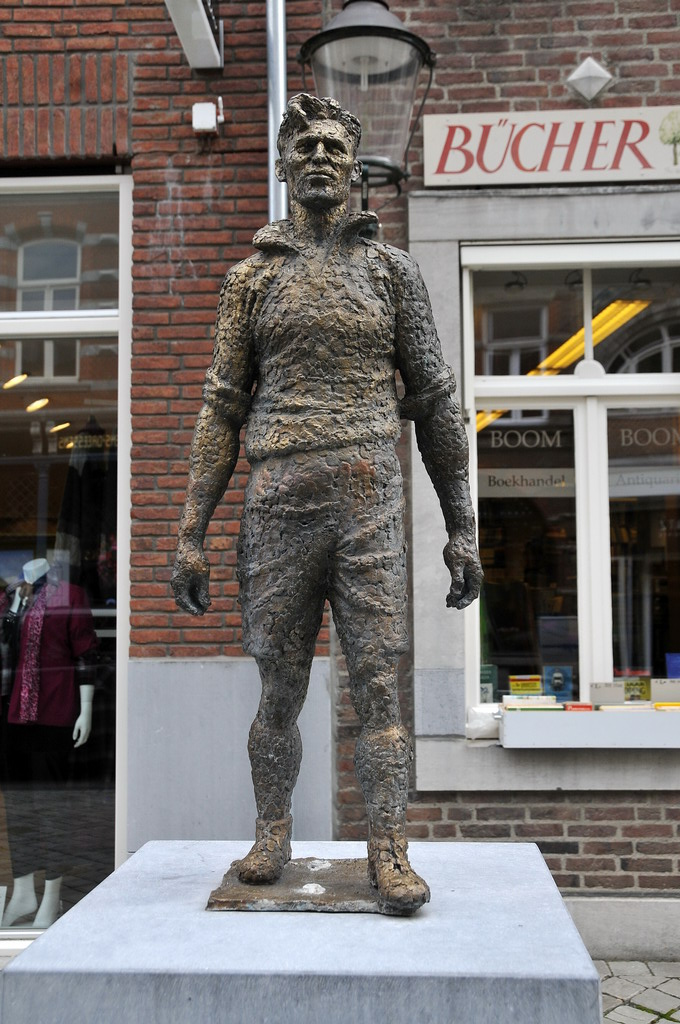
- Statue of Pierre Massy

Personal information
- Full name: Petrus Hubertus Massy
- Date of birth: 3 February 1900
- Place of birth: Roermond, Netherlands
- Date of death: 3 August 1958 (aged 58)
- Place of death: Roermond, Netherlands

Senior career*
Years	Team	Apps	(Gls)
- RVV Roermond

International career
1926–1928	Netherlands	12	(3)
- * Club domestic league appearances and goals

Petrus Hubertus "Pierre" Massy (3 February 1900 – 3 August 1958) was a Dutch footballer who earned 12 caps for the Dutch national side between 1926 and 1928, scoring three goals, and participated at the 1928 Summer Olympics. He played club football for RVV Roermond.
