= Marcel Bertrand =

French footballer (1899-1943)

Personal information
- Full name: Marcel Félix Bertrand
- Date of birth: 13 April 1899
- Place of birth: Bondy, France
- Date of death: 19 March 1933 (aged 33)
- Place of death: Troyes, France

International career
| Years | Team | Apps | (Gls) |
| 1929 | France | 5 | (0) |

Marcel Bertrand (13 April 1899 – 19 March 1933) was a French footballer. He played in five matches for the France national football team in 1929.
