= Charles Lewis Gruneisen =

English journalist and music critic

- Born: 2 November 1806; Bloomsbury, London
- Died: 1 November 1879 (aged 72)
- Resting place: Highgate Cemetery
- Notable work: The Opera and the Press (1869); Sketches of Spain and the Spaniards during the Carlist Civil War (1874)
- Spouse: Emma Jane Moore

Charles Lewis Gruneisen (1806–1879) was an English journalist and musical critic.

== Early life ==
He was born in Bloomsbury, London, 2 November 1806, son of Charles Gruneisen from Stuttgart, naturalised as British in 1796. He was educated by a private tutor and at Pentonville academy, with studies completed in the Netherlands.

Gruneisen started to write as a young man, and in 1832 was appointed sub-editor of The Guardian, the conservative Anglican weekly. He became editor of the British Traveller and Commercial and Law Gazette, a London evening paper, in 1833, and in the same year managed the foreign department of the Morning Post, and also a sub-editor.

== Carlist War ==
In March 1837 Gruneisen was sent to Spain as special correspondent of the Morning Post to cover the First Carlist War. He was attached to the Carlist army at the headquarters of Don Carlos, Count of Molina. He was awarded the cross of the Order of Charles III.

Gruneisen was present at the Carlist victory at the Battle of Villar de los Navarros, 24 August 1837, intervening to prevent harm to prisoners. He remained with the army when it advanced to Madrid in September 1837, and in its dangerous retreat. After the Battle of Retuerta, 5 October 1837, he wanted to leave the country, but on 19 October was taken prisoner by Christino soldiers. He was considered a Carlist and a spy, released by the intervention of Lord Palmerston. He returned to England in January 1838.

== Later life ==
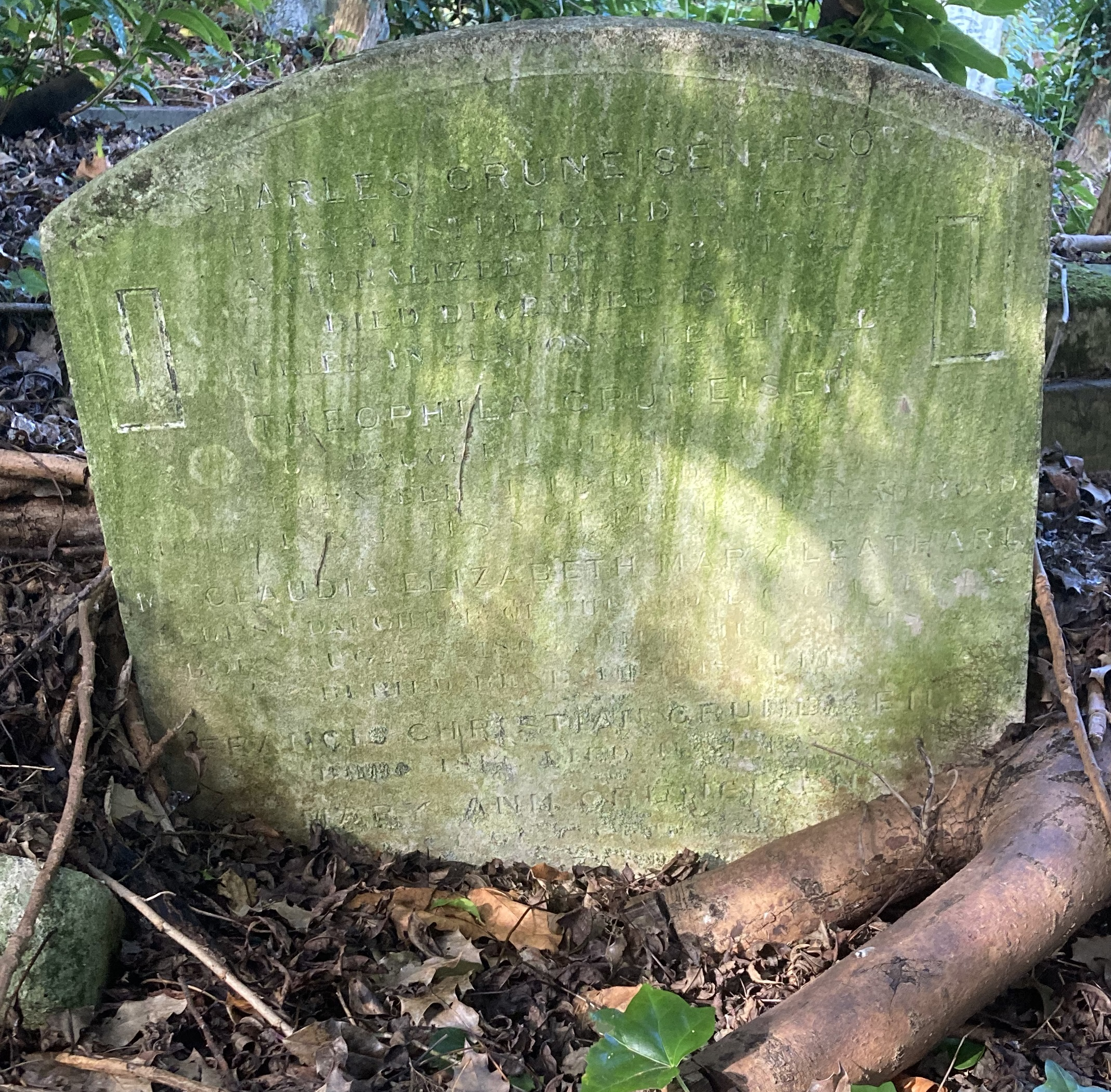
Grave of Charles Lewis Gruneisen in Highgate Cemetery

From 1839 to 1844 Gruneisen was the Paris correspondent of the Morning Post, devising express communications with London, and a pigeon post; then editor of The Great Gun, a weekly illustrated paper, from 16 November 1844 to 28 June 1845. He was special correspondent of the Morning Herald during the tour of Queen Victoria and Albert, Prince Consort in Germany in 1845.

On his return to England Gruneisen acted as music critic to The Britannia, the Illustrated London News, and the Morning Chronicle, to 1853. It was in this area that he became known, drawing attention to Wagner, and knowledgeable on the music of Spain. He succeeded Charles Cowden Clarke in 1868 as music critic of The Athenæum, a position he held for the rest of his life.

Gruneisen died at his residence, 16 Surrey Street, Strand, London, 1 November 1879, and was buried in the western side of Highgate Cemetery on 7 November.

== Interests ==
The Royal Italian Opera was established at Covent Garden in 1846, with Michael Costa as conductor; it was backed by Gruneisen, who had helped to plan it. In 1849 he dealt with Giacomo Meyerbeer over the Covent Garden production of Le prophète. In 1869 he publicly expressed dissatisfaction with the management of Frederick Gye; who broke with Gruneisen and entered into partnership with James Henry Mapleson.

Gruneisen was one of the main founders and a director of the Conservative Land Society 7 September 1852, and acted as secretary of it from 1853 to December 1872. He was a fellow of the Royal Geographical Society, a member of the Society of Arts and of the Royal Literary Fund, and one of the trustees of the Newspaper Press Fund.

== Works ==
Gruneisen was the author of The Opera and the Press (1869) and of Sketches of Spain and the Spaniards during the Carlist Civil War (1874). He also wrote a short Memoir of Meyerbeer, and contributed notes to Wilhelm Adolf Lampadius's Life of Mendelssohn, 1876.

== Family ==
In 1839 Gruneisen married Emma Jane Moore.

== In media ==
In the 2017 documentary film Gruneisen: El primer corresponsal de guerra, Gruneisen is played by Álvaro de Paz.

== Notes ==
Attribution

This article incorporates text from a publication now in the public domain: Stephen, Leslie; Lee, Sidney, eds. (1890). "Gruneisen, Charles Lewis". Dictionary of National Biography. Vol. 23. London: Smith, Elder & Co.
