= Kees van der Zalm =

Dutch footballer

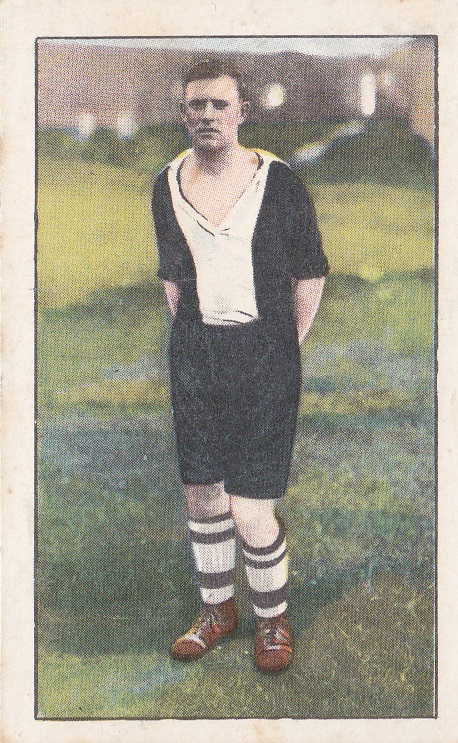
- Kees van der Zalm in 1931

Personal information
- Date of birth: 30 September 1901
- Place of birth: Loosduinen, Netherlands
- Date of death: 25 December 1957 (aged 56)
- Place of death: Morwell, Victoria, Australia

International career
Years	Team	Apps	(Gls)
- Netherlands

Kees van der Zalm (30 September 1901 – 25 December 1957) was a Dutch footballer. He played in three matches for the Netherlands national football team between 1927 and 1929.

Kees migrated to Australia in 1952 with his wife and six children, settling in Morwell. He became coach of the local Morwell Soccer Club and won a Latrobe Valley Soccer League (LVSL) championship with them in 1954.

In an interview with the Morwell Advertiser, van der Zalm said he was "agreeably surprised" by the quality of the LVSL and his presence was hailed as a major boon for football in the Latrobe Valley.

He died of lung cancer in December 1956 in Morwell.
