= Hans Wentorf =

German footballer

Personal information
- Date of birth: 6 April 1899
- Date of death: 11 May 1976 (aged 77)
- Position: Goalkeeper

Senior career*
| Years | Team | Apps | (Gls) |
| 1918–1922 | Eimsbütteler TV | | |
| 1922–1935 | Altona 93 | | |

International career
| 1928 | Germany | 2 | (0) |
- * Club domestic league appearances and goals

Hans Wentorf (6 April 1899 – 11 May 1976) was a German international footballer. He was part of Germany's team at the 1928 Summer Olympics, but he did not play in any matches.
