= Agustín Ojeda (footballer, born 1898) =

Mexican footballer (1898-1938)

Personal information
- Date of birth: 9 September 1898
- Date of death: 16 November 1938 (aged 40)

International career
| Years | Team | Apps | (Gls) |
- Mexico

Agustín Ojeda (9 September 1898 – 16 November 1938) was a Mexican footballer. He competed in the men's tournament at the 1928 Summer Olympics.
