= Fritz Grüneisen =

Swiss footballer

Personal information
- Date of birth: 18 December 1906
- Date of death: 14 July 1970 (aged 63)
- Position: Goalkeeper

International career
Years	Team	Apps	(Gls)
1929–1931	Switzerland	3	(0)

Fritz Grüneisen (18 December 1906 – 14 July 1970) was a Swiss footballer. He played in three matches for the Switzerland national football team from 1929 to 1931. He was also part of Switzerland's squad for the football tournament at the 1928 Summer Olympics, but he did not play in any matches.
