= Felix Smeets =

Dutch footballer

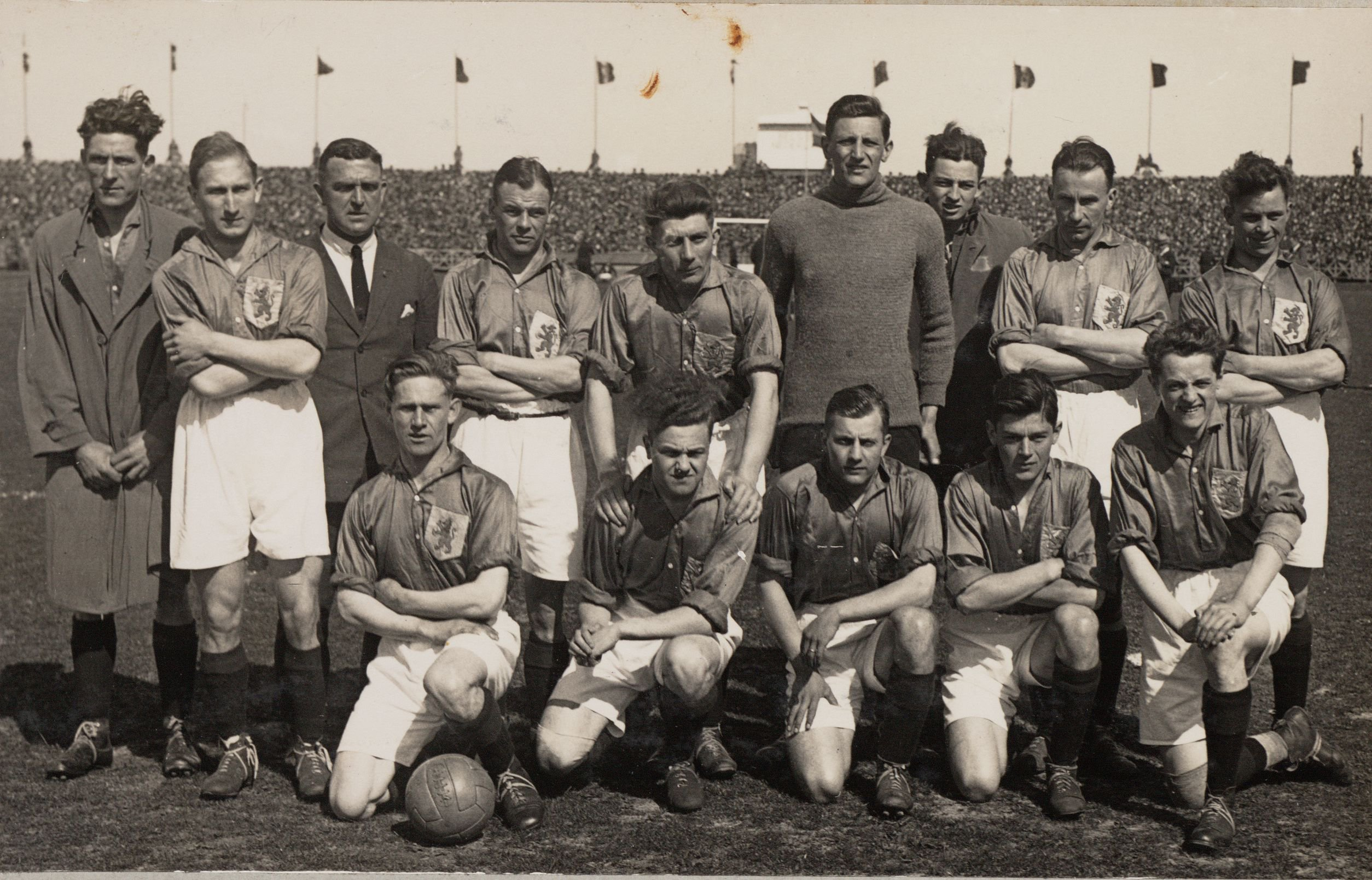
- Smeets (front row, second from right) representing the Netherlands on 1 May 1927.

Personal information
- Date of birth: 29 April 1904
- Place of birth: The Hague, Netherlands
- Date of death: 14 March 1961 (aged 56)
- Place of death: Netherlands
- Position: Striker

Senior career*
Years	Team	Apps	(Gls)
	HBS	124	(76)

International career
1927–1929	Netherlands	14	(7)
- * Club domestic league appearances and goals

Felix Smeets (29 April 1904 – 14 March 1961) was a Dutch footballer who earned 14 caps for the Netherlands national side between 1927 and 1929, scoring 7 goals. He was also part of the Netherlands squad at the 1928 Summer Olympics, but did not play in any matches.

== Honours ==
SVB (Soerabajasche Voetbalbond)

- Dutch East Indies Championship: 1930
