= Rudy Kuntner =

American soccer player

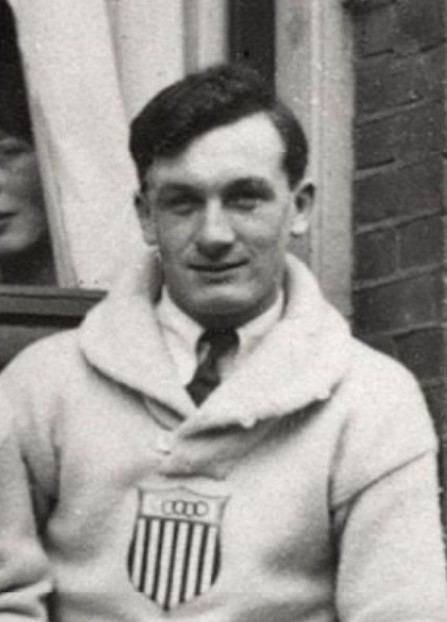
- Rudy Kuntner in 1928

Personal information
- Full name: Rudolph F. Kuntner
- Date of birth: October 6, 1908
- Place of birth: Vienna, Austria
- Date of death: December 16, 1982 (aged 74)
- Place of death: Rego Park, New York, United States
- Height: 5 ft 7 in (1.70 m)
- Position: Forward

Senior career*
Years	Team	Apps	(Gls)
1927–1928	New York Giants	5	(3)
1928–1929	New York Hungaria	?	(8)
1929	New York Vienna		
1930	Bridgeport Hungaria	9	(2)
1930–1932	New York Giants		
1932–	New York Americans		
- Brooklyn St. Mary's Celtic
- Brookhattan

International career
1928	United States	2	(2)
- * Club domestic league appearances and goals

Rudy Kuntner (June 10, 1908 – December 16, 1982) was a soccer player who played as a forward. Born in Austria, he was a member of the United States team at the 1928 Summer Olympics. He is also known as a long time stage manager for the Metropolitan Opera and is a member of the National Soccer Hall of Fame.

== Youth ==
Kuntner immigrated to the U.S. with his family when he was seven. His family settled in the New York City area where he began playing soccer. However, he was an all around athlete and played baseball, football, basketball and tennis at Gorton High School in Yonkers, New York.

== Professional soccer ==
Kuntner signed with the New York Giants of the American Soccer League during the 1927–1928 season. He played five games, all in the second half of the season, scoring three goals. In 1928, he moved to the New York Hungaria in the short lived Eastern Soccer League. After the collapse of the ESL in 1929, Kuntner moved to First Vienna (also known as Wiener Sports Club and New York Vienna F.C.) of the German American Soccer League. In 1930, he was back in the ASL with Bridgeport Hungaria, but the team moved to Newark after ten games, then folded. He then moved to the New York Giants of the American Soccer League (ASL). The Giants folded in 1932 and Kuntner moved to New York Americans of the second ASL. In 1937, the Americans fell in the National Challenge Cup final to St. Louis Shamrocks. In 1939, he was playing with Brooklyn St. Mary's Celtic when it won the National Cup final over Chicago Manhattan Beer. Kuntner was still going strong in the 1942–1943 season when he scored nine goals in seventeen games with Brookhattan. In 1945, he was still active with Brookhattan when it won the triple, the league title, Lewis Cup (league cup) and National Challenge Cup.

== National and Olympic teams ==
Kuntner earned two caps with the U.S. national team in 1928. At the time, the Olympic soccer games counted as full internationals and his first cap with the national team came in the 1928 Summer Olympics. That game, an 11–2 loss to Argentina saw Kuntner score in his debut with the national team. Following the tournament, the team traveled to Poland where it tied the Poland national team 3–3. Kuntner again scored, joining a handful of U.S. players who scored in their first two international games. Despite his scoring success, Kuntner was never again called up for the national team.

== Metropolitan Opera ==
In addition to his success on the soccer field, Kuntner found great success as a stage hand at the Metropolitan Opera. He began as an electrician, but over the years moved into areas of greater responsibility including lighting and stage management. According to the Soccer Hall of Fame profile, he "received wide acclaim for his role in the staging of Tristan and Isolde in 1971."

In 1963, Kuntner was inducted into the National Soccer Hall of Fame.
