= Estudiantes de Santiago del Estero =

Estudiantes
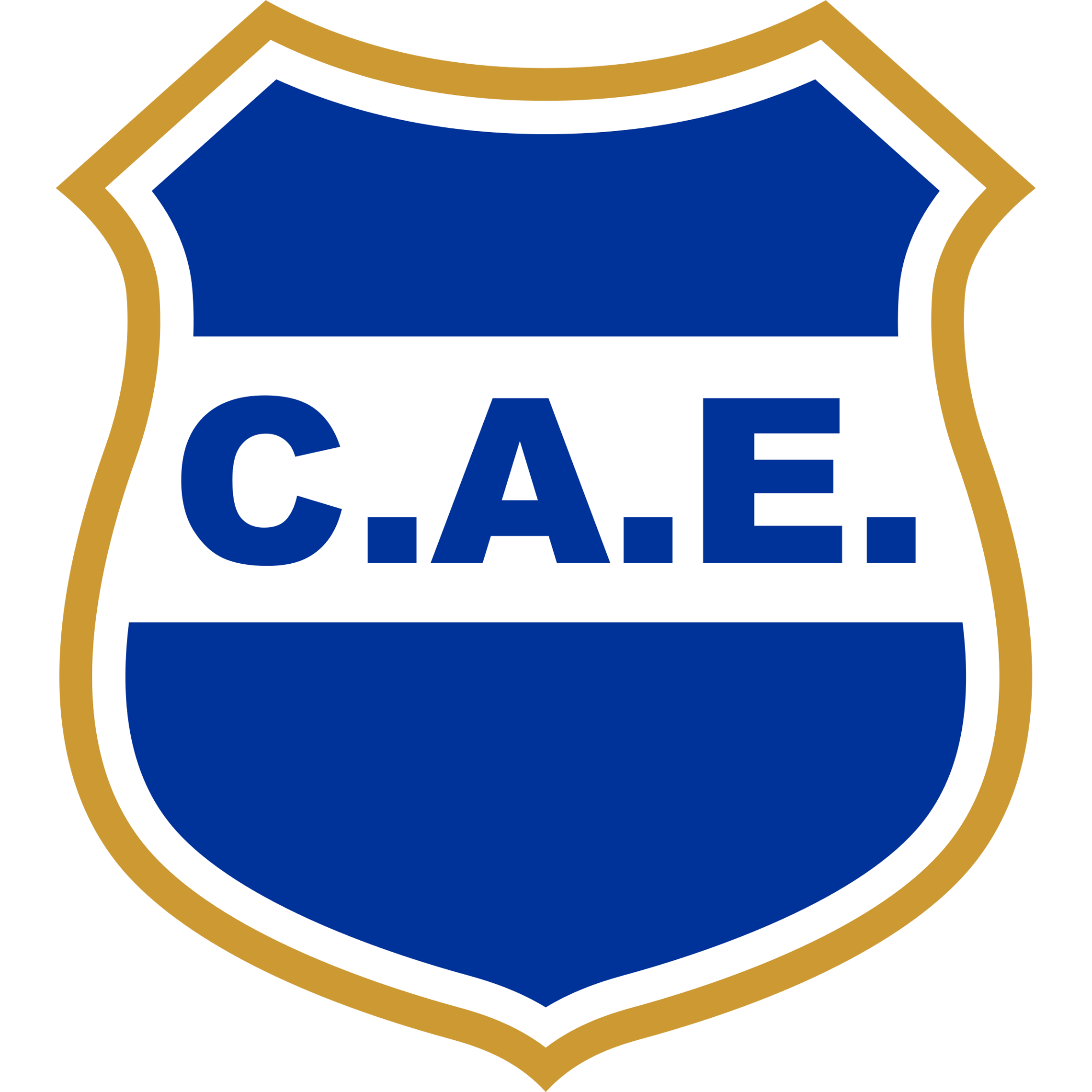
- Full name: Club Atlético Estudiantes
- Nickname(s): Casaca Patria; Estuky
- Founded: 1 April 1913; 111 years ago
- Ground: Dr. Andrés Vergottini
- Capacity: 2,000
- President: Ivanna Paola Mujica
- Coach: Daniel Villalva
- League: Torneo Regional Federal Amateur
- 2022-23: Second Round (Central Region)
Home colours	Away colours

Club Atlético Estudiantes is an Argentine social and sports institution in the Barrio Huaico Hondo, Santiago del Estero, capital of the province of the same name . It was founded on April 1 of 1913 to dedicate himself to his main activity, soccer. The sports institution is known by the nickname Estuky.

Its stadium is called Dr. Andrés Esteban Vergottini in honor of its first president, and is located on Avenida Antenor Álvarez 1576.

Estudiantes played the 1982 Primera División season. Despite the classification, the club was eliminated from the tournament in the group stage after having reached 4 points in 16 games. He has also played in other national tournaments such as the Torneo Argentino B, Torneo Argentino C and the Copa de la República 1945 where he reached the semifinals. At the regional level it is part of the Liga Santiagueña de Fútbol, where it has been consecrated 14 opportunities.

== 1982 Argentine Primera División ==
The matches played were:

- vs Ferro Carril Oeste 0-3 (L) 0-3 (V)
- vs Unión (Santa Fe) 1-3 (L), 1-1 (V)
- vs Independiente 1-4 (L), 0-3 (V)
- vs Argentinos Juniors 1-3 (L), 2-4 (V)
- vs Atl. Concepción (Tucumán) 0-1 (L), 1-2 (V)
- vs San Lorenzo (Mar del Plata) 0-3 (L), 1-1 (V)
- vs Unión San Vicente (Córdoba) 0-2 (L), 4-3 (V)

== Titles ==
=== Regional tournaments ===
- Liga Santiagueña de Fútbol (14): 1942, 1944, 1949, 1951, 1952, 1958, 1973 (2), 1974, 1977, 1980, 1981, 2003, Copa Santiago 2013.
