= Jean-Pierre Weisgerber =

Luxembourgish footballer

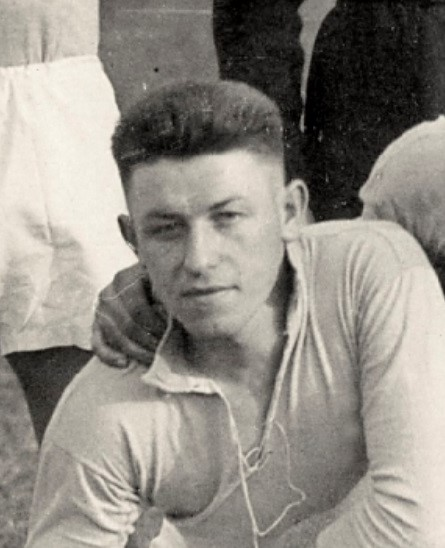
- Jean-Pierre Weisgerber in 1928

Personal information
- Date of birth: 28 March 1905
- Place of birth: Esch-sur-Alzette, Luxembourg
- Date of death: 4 April 1994 (aged 89)
- Place of death: Esch-sur-Alzette, Luxembourg

International career
| Years | Team | Apps | (Gls) |
- Luxembourg

Jean-Pierre Weisgerber (28 March 1905 – 4 April 1994) was a Luxembourgish footballer. He competed at the 1924 Summer Olympics and the 1928 Summer Olympics.
