= Josef Hornauer =

German footballer (1908–1985)

Personal information
- Date of birth: 14 January 1908
- Place of birth: Munich, Germany
- Date of death: 12 December 1985 (aged 77)
- Place of death: Munich, Germany
- Position: Striker

Senior career*
Years	Team	Apps	(Gls)
1925–1928	TSV 1860 Munich		
1928–1934	1. FC Nürnberg		

International career
1928–1931	Germany	5	(2)
- * Club domestic league appearances and goals

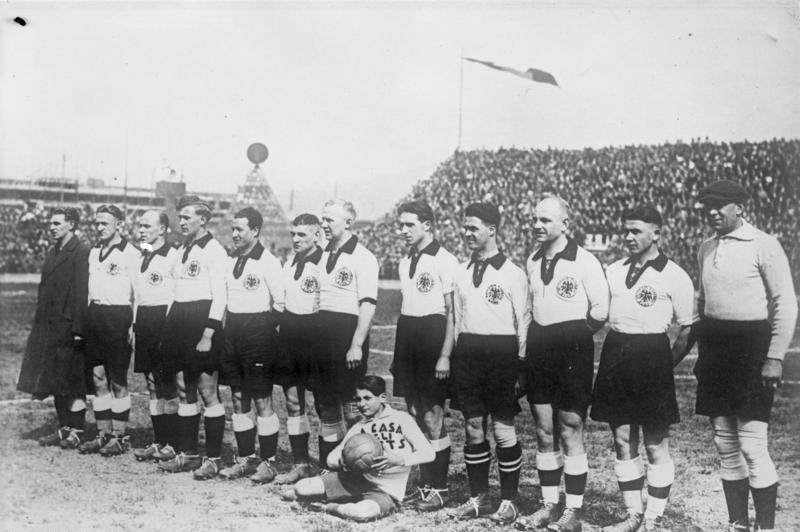
Federal Archives Image 102-07723, Milan, Italy-Germany football match.jpg

Josef Hornauer (14 January 1908 – 12 December 1985) was a German international footballer. He was part of Germany's team at the 1928 Summer Olympics.
