= Lighthouse Boys Club =

American soccer club in Philadelphia, Pennsylvania

The Lighthouse Boys Club is an American soccer club established in Philadelphia, Pennsylvania in 1897. The team was the dominant U.S. youth soccer club of the early twentieth century. While other youth teams grew in prominence by mid-century, the Lighthouse was still winning national championships into the late 1960s.

== History ==
In 1893, Esther W. Kelly transformed a northern Philadelphia house into a community center. Then, the center moved to a large, three story building in 1895 which came to be known as The Lighthouse. Over the decades, The Lighthouse has expanded to areas in and around Philadelphia, providing charitable and community services to the Philadelphia population.

In 1897, the Church Club of Philadelphia helped Miss Kelly establish The Lighthouse Boys' Club and The Lighthouse began creating athletic teams the following year. The Lighthouse has sponsored numerous leagues and teams in multiple sports, but became renowned for its Lighthouse Soccer Club. This club produced some of the greatest U.S. players of the early twentieth century and won five James P. McGuire Cups (U-19 national championship).

The Lighthouse began to decline in the 1980s but the soccer team continues to play today.

== Honors ==
- James P. McGuire Cup: 1938, 1948, 1949, 1957, 1967
