= Football at the 1928 Summer Olympics =

Coordinates: 52.3434°N 4.8542°E

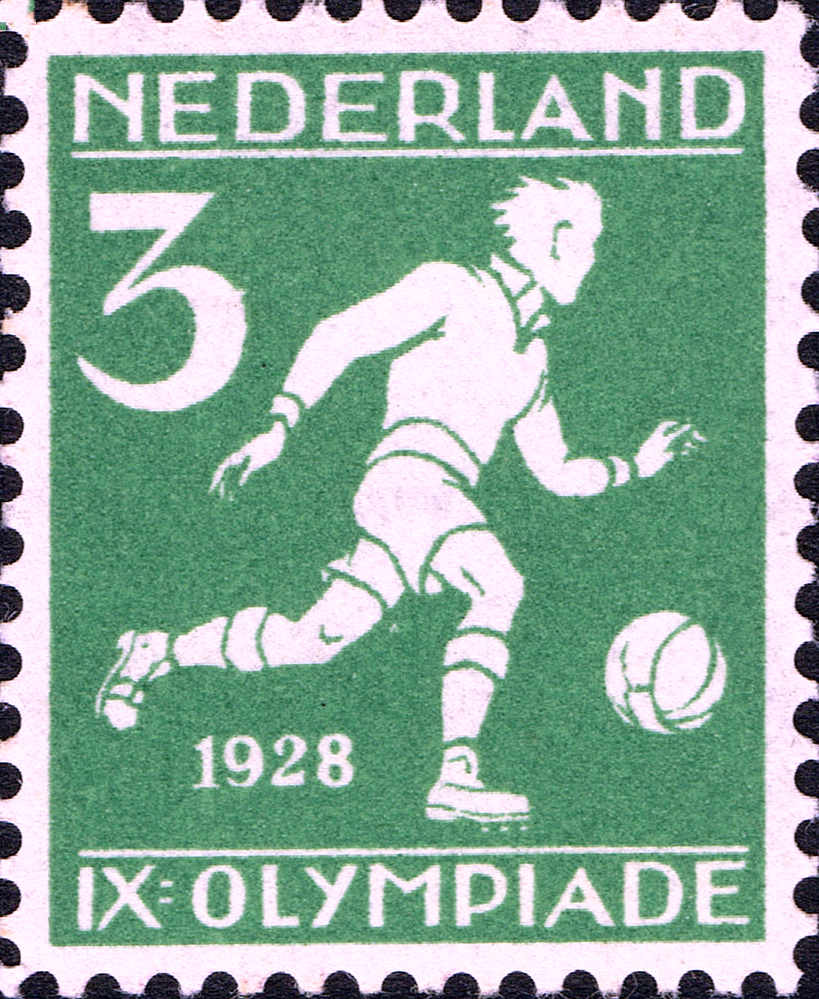
- Football at the 1928 Summer Olympics on a stamp of the Netherlands

Tournament details
- Host country: Netherlands
- City: Amsterdam
- Dates: 27 May – 13 June 1928
- Teams: 17 (from 5 confederations)
- Venues: 2 (in 1 host city)

Final positions
- Champions: Uruguay (2nd title)
- Runners-up: Argentina
- Third place: Italy
- Fourth place: Egypt

Tournament statistics
- Matches played: 22
- Goals scored: 128 (5.82 per match)
- Top scorer(s): (Argentina) Domingo Tarasconi (11 goals)

Football was one of the tournaments at the 1928 Summer Olympics. It was won by Uruguay against Argentina, and was the last Olympic football tournament before the inception of the FIFA World Cup, which was held for the first time in 1930. The status of the 1924 and 1928 Olympic football tournaments has generated controversy between those who argue that the gold medals in those two games have an equivalent status to the Football World Cup held since 1930, and those who maintain that the World Cup is a tournament that should not be equated with those Olympic tournament.

== Venues ==
Amsterdam
Olympic Stadium	Het Nederlandsch Sportpark (Oude Stadion)
Capacity: 33,005	Capacity: 29,787
Football at the 1928 Summer Olympics is located in Greater Amsterdam

== Background ==
Until 1928, the Olympic football tournament had represented the World Championship of football (the 1920 (14), 1924 (22) and 1928 tournaments (17) all had greater participation than that of the first World Cup in 1930).

This presented a significant problem for the governing body, FIFA, since the tournament, though organised and run by FIFA, was an event subject to the ethical foundation that underpinned the Olympic movement.

At the time, all Olympic competitors had to maintain an amateur status, whereas professionalism was dominant in football. Increasingly, FIFA had sought to appease those nations that required concessions in order that players could participate in the Olympics. This required there to be an acceptance that irregular payment could be made to players by national associations: the so-called "broken time payments" by which loss of pay and expenses would be met.

On 17 February 1928, the four "home" associations of the United Kingdom, voted unanimously to withdraw from FIFA in opposition to the manner in which the governing body was seeking to dictate on such matters and, as was noted "that (the four Associations) be free to conduct their affairs in the way their long experience has shown them to be desirable".

Henri Delaunay, president of the French Football Federation felt that FIFA needed to organise an international tournament outside of the Olympics. In 1926 he stated, at the FIFA Conference: "Today international football can no longer be held within the confines of the Olympics; and many countries where professionalism is now recognised and organised cannot any longer be represented there by their best players". The day before the tournament began, on 26 May 1928 the FIFA congress in Amsterdam presided over by Jules Rimet, voted that a new FIFA World Cup tournament be organised in 1930 and be open to all member nations. Italy, Sweden, the Netherlands, Spain and Uruguay would all lodge applications to host the event.

== Participation ==
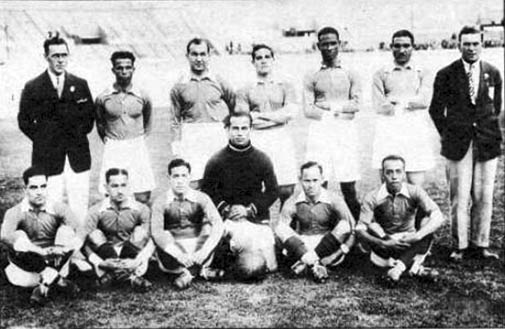
The Egyptian squad

By 1926, three years had passed since the British Associations had asked FIFA to accept their definition of what an amateur player was; FIFA had refused. The Rome Convention was called to try to coax the British and Danes back into the fold; it proved only to distance them. Switzerland, a nation that favoured broken time payments suggested: "It is not allowed to pay compensation for broken time, except in some well-circumscribed cases, to be fixed by each National Association". This challenge to the centralised authority of FIFA was disputed by the Football Association. In 1927 FIFA asked the Olympic committee to accept the concept of broken time payments as an overriding condition for the competing members. The British Associations consequently withdrew from the Olympiad and a few months later withdrew from FIFA (Association Football (1960))

Uruguay were considered to be the strongest side with the Argentinians shading the advantage between the two. Upon returning home in 1924 Uruguay had ceded to a request to play a disbelieving Argentina in a two staged contest; Argentinian fans hurling missiles at Jose Leandro Andrade to the extent that he had with adopt a position deep in-field. The Argentinians won. Uruguay, the defending Olympic champions, once again sent a side made up, predominantly, by the personnel of their two biggest clubs: Nacional and, to a lesser degree, Peñarol.

=== The Europeans ===
The competition was more competitive than the 1924 edition. Ten European nations (17 in all) had made the journey to the Netherlands for the competition. The Italians had been defeated only twice in three years. The Italian coach, Augusto Rangone, had been a beneficiary of the national federation's decision in 1923 to permit subsidies to cover player's lost wages. For two years his forward line had remained comparatively the same: Adolfo Baloncieri, Virgilio Levratto; even the loss of the Argentinian-Italian Julio Libonatti before the tournament was made good by the inclusion of Angelo Schiavio. Spain had been defeated once since the last Olympic Games. After the first game, however, they lost their experienced captain Pedro Vallana.

== Final tournament ==
Uruguay immediately dispatched the hosts, the Netherlands, 2–0 in front of 40,000 people with none of the controversy that had surrounded their previous encounter at the 1924 Summer Olympics. The game was controlled by Jean Langenus, a performance which was recognised. Meanwhile, the Argentinians had little difficulty against the United States winning 11–2. Elsewhere Germany were defeated by the Uruguayans 4–1. In another quarter-final the Italians encountered Spain. In the first game they reached a tie with the Spanish fighting back from a half time deficit to force a replay. In the replay three days later the Azzurri scored four without response before the break. Rangone kept faith in a largely unchanged team. Spain, on the other hand, had gambled by making five changes to Italy's two. Portugal, after wins over Chile (4–2) and Kingdom of SCS (2–1) lost to Egypt 2–1. The African side advanced to a semi-final tie against Argentina.

== Bracket ==
Round of 16
30 May – Amsterdam (Olympic)
Uruguay	2
Netherlands	0
28 May – Amsterdam (Olympic)
Germany	4
Switzerland	0
29 May – Amsterdam (Olympic)
Italy	4
France	3
30 May – Amsterdam (Sportpark)
Spain	7
Mexico	1
28 May – Amsterdam (Olympic)
Egypt	7
Turkey	1
29 May – Amsterdam (Sportpark)
Portugal	2
Kingdom of SCS	1
27 May – Amsterdam (Olympic)
Argentina	11
United States	2
29 May – Amsterdam (Olympic)
Belgium	5
Luxembourg	3

Quarter-finals
3 June – Amsterdam (Olympic)
Uruguay	4
Germany	1
1 and 4 June – Amsterdam (Olympic)
Italy (rematch)	1 (7)
Spain	1 (1)
4 June – Amsterdam (Olympic)
Egypt	2
Portugal	1
2 June – Amsterdam (Olympic)
Argentina	6
Belgium	3

Semi-finals
7 June – Amsterdam (Olympic)
Uruguay	3
Italy	2
6 June – Amsterdam (Olympic)
Egypt	0
Argentina	6

Final
10 and 13 June – Amsterdam (Olympic)
Uruguay (rematch)	1 (2)
Argentina	1 (1)
Third place
9 June – Amsterdam (Olympic)
Italy	11
Egypt	3

== Preliminary round ==
27 May 1928
15:00

Portugal	4–2	Chile
Vítor Silva 38'; Pepe 40', 50'; Mota 63'	Report	Saavedra 14'; Carbonell 30'

Olympic Stadium, Amsterdam
Attendance: 2,309
Referee: Youssuf Mohamed (EGY)

== First round ==
27 May 1928
19:00

Belgium	5–3	Luxembourg
R. Braine 9', 72'; Versyp 20'; Moeschal 23', 67'	Report	Schütz 31'; Weisgerber 42'; Theissen 44'

Olympic Stadium, Amsterdam
Attendance: 5,834
Referee: Lorenzo Martínez (ARG)

28 May 1928
14:00

Germany	4–0	Switzerland
Hofmann 17', 75', 85'; Hornauer 42'	Report

Olympic Stadium, Amsterdam
Attendance: 16,158
Referee: Willem Eymers (NED)

28 May 1928
19:00

Egypt	7–1	Turkey
El-Hassani 20' (pen.); Riadh 27'; El Tetsh 46', 50', 63'; Houda 53'; El-Zobair 86'	Report	Refet 71'

Olympic Stadium, Amsterdam
Attendance: 2,744
Referee: Marcel Slawick (FRA)

29 May 1928
14:00

Italy	4–3	France
Rosetti 19'; Levratto 39'; Banchero 43'; Baloncieri 60'	Report	Brouzes 15', 17'; Dauphin 61'

Olympic Stadium, Amsterdam
Attendance: 2,509
Referee: Henri Christophe (BEL)

29 May 1928
16:00

Portugal	2–1	Kingdom of SCS
Vítor Silva 25'; Augusto Silva 90'	Report	Bonačić 40'

Het Nederlandsch Sportpark, Amsterdam
Attendance: 1,226
Referee: Alfred Birlem (GER)

29 May 1928
19:00

Argentina	11–2	United States
Ferreira 9', 29'; Tarasconi 24', 63', 66', 89'; Orsi 41', 73'; Cherro 47', 49', 57'	Report	Kuntner 55'; Caroll 75'

Olympic Stadium, Amsterdam
Attendance: 3,848
Referee: Paul Ruoff (SUI)

30 May 1928
14:00

Spain	7–1	Mexico
Regueiro 13', 27'; Yermo 43', 63', 85'; Marculeta 66'; Mariscal 70'	Report	Carreño 76'

Het Nederlandsch Sportpark, Amsterdam
Attendance: 2,344
Referee: Gabor Boronkay (HUN)

30 May 1928
19:00

Netherlands	0–2	Uruguay
	Report	Scarone 20'; Urdinarán 86'

Olympic Stadium, Amsterdam
Attendance: 27,730
Referee: Jan Langenus (BEL)

== Quarter-finals ==
1 June 1928
19:00

Italy	1–1	Spain
Baloncieri 63'	Report	Zaldúa 11'

Olympic Stadium, Amsterdam
Attendance: 3,388
Referee: Domingo Lombardi (URU)
4 June 1928
14:00

Italy	7–1	Spain
Magnozzi 14'; Schiavio 15'; Baloncieri 18'; Bernardini 40'; Rivolta 72'; Levratto 76', 77'	Report	Yermo 47'

Olympic Stadium, Amsterdam
Attendance: 4,770
Referee: Hans Boekman (NED)

2 June 1928
16:00

Argentina	6–3	Belgium
Tarasconi 1', 10', 75', 89'; Ferreira 4'; Orsi 81'	Report	R. Braine 24'; Vanhalme 28'; Moeschal 53'

Olympic Stadium, Amsterdam
Attendance: 16,399
Referee: Gamma Malcher (ITA)

3 June 1928
16:00

Uruguay	4–1	Germany
Petrone 35', 39', 84'; Castro 63'	Report	Hofmann 81'

Olympic Stadium, Amsterdam
Attendance: 25,131
Referee: Youssuf Mohamed (EGY)

4 June 1928
19:00

Egypt	2–1	Portugal
El Tetsh 15'; Riadh 48'	Report	Vítor Silva 76'

Olympic Stadium, Amsterdam
Attendance: 3,448
Referee: Giovanni Mauro (ITA)

== Semi-finals ==
This meant that in the semi-final Italy played Uruguay. The Italians selected Giampiero Combi in goal, Angelo Schiavio, in attack. Both would be crowned World Champions at the 1934 FIFA World Cup. In this game the Uruguayans stormed to a convincing lead by the break; Levratto's goal in the second half flattered the Italians because Uruguay ran out comfortable winners by the odd goal in 5; José Pedro Cea, Héctor Scarone scoring for the Celestes.

6 June 1928
19:00

Argentina	6–0	Egypt
Cherro 10'; Ferreira 32', 82'; Tarasconi 37', 54', 61'	Report

Olympic Stadium, Amsterdam
Attendance: 7,887
Referee: Pedro Escartín (ESP)

7 June 1928
19:00

Uruguay	3–2	Italy
Cea 17'; Campolo 28'; Scarone 31'	Report	Baloncieri 9'; Levratto 60'

Olympic Stadium, Amsterdam
Attendance: 15,230
Referee: Willem Eymers (NED)

== Bronze medal match ==
9 June 1928
16:00

Italy	11–3	Egypt
Schiavio 6', 42', 58'; Baloncieri 14', 52'; Banchero 19', 39', 44'; Magnozzi 72', 80', 88'	Report	Riadh 12', 16'; El-Ezam 60'

Olympic Stadium, Amsterdam
Attendance: 6,378
Referee: Jan Langenus (BEL)

== Gold medal match ==
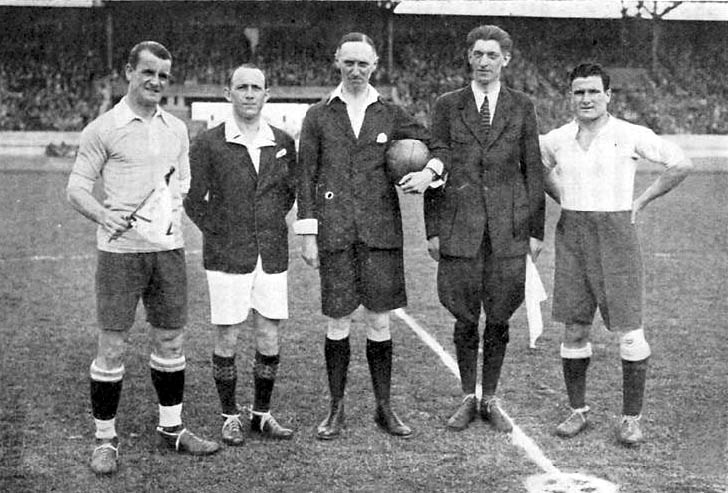
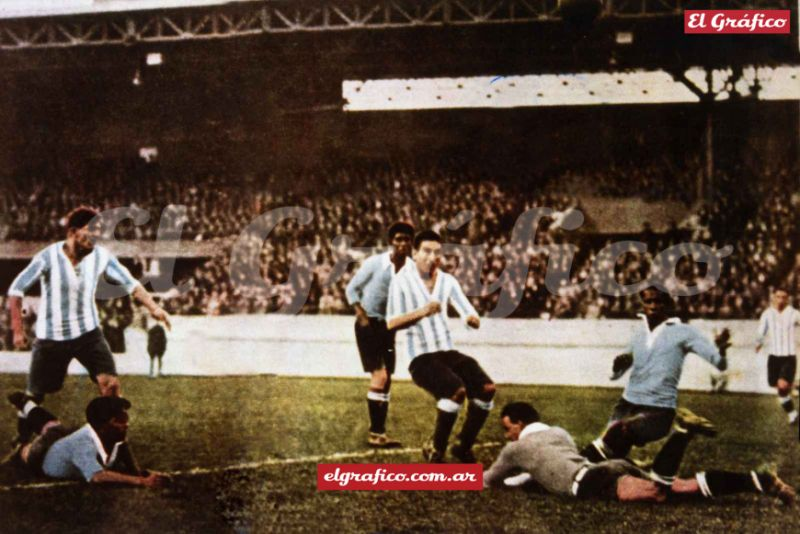
(Left): Uruguay and Argentina captains, referee Johannes Mutters and linesmen before the final; (right): A moment of the match

The final was a close-run affair. Both nations had been undefeated in competitive matches against other nations but had traded losses to each other since the last Olympic competition. The interest was immense. The Dutch had received 250,000 requests for tickets from all over Europe.

Once again, there was little in it; the first game finished 1–1 and the tie went to a replay. Uruguay's Scarone converted the winner in the second half of that game.

10 June 1928
16:00
Final

Uruguay	1–1 (a.e.t.)	Argentina
Petrone 23'	Report	Ferreira 50'

Olympic Stadium, Amsterdam
Attendance: 28,253
Referee: Johannes Mutters (NED)

=== Rematch ===
13 June 1928
19:00
Rematch

Uruguay	2–1	Argentina
Figueroa 17'; Scarone 73'	Report	Monti 28'

Olympic Stadium, Amsterdam
Attendance: 28,113
Referee: Johannes Mutters (Netherlands)

Team details

Uruguay	Argentina

GK	Andres Mazali
RB	José Nasazzi (c)
LB	Pedro Arispe
RH	José Andrade
CH	Juan Píriz
LH	Álvaro Gestido
OR	Juan Arremón
IR	Héctor Scarone
CF	René Borjas
IL	Pedro Cea
OL	Roberto Figueroa
Manager:
(Uruguay) Primo Gianotti

GK	Ángel Bossio
RB	Ludovico Bidoglio
LB	Fernando Paternoster
RH	Segundo Médici
CH	Luis Monti
LH	Juan Evaristo
OR	Alfredo Carricaberry
IR	Domingo Tarasconi
CF	Manuel Ferreira
IL	Feliciano Perducca
OL	Raimundo Orsi
Manager:
(Spain) José Lago Millán

Linesmen:
Ulises Saucedo (Bolivia)
Henri Christophe (Belgium)

== Consolation round ==
=== First round ===
The consolation tournament was ratified by FIFA but, as it was not organized by the Amsterdam Olympic organization, Olympic historians do not consider these matches to be part of the 1928 Summer Olympics.

5 June 1928
14:00

Netherlands	3–1	Belgium
Ghering 4'; Smeets 6'; Tap 63'	Report	P. Braine 85'

Sparta-Stadion Het Kasteel, Rotterdam
Attendance: 20,000
Referee: Gamma Malcher (ITA)

5 June 1928
14:00

Chile	3–1	Mexico
Subiabre 24', 48', 89'	Report	Sota 15'

Monnikenhuize, Arnhem
Attendance: 5,000
Referee: Johannes Mutters (NED)

=== Consolation final ===
8 June 1928
14:00

Netherlands	2–2	Chile
Ghering 59'; Smeets 66'	Report	Bravo 55'; Alfaro 89'

Sparta-Stadion Het Kasteel, Rotterdam
Attendance: 18,000
Referee: Guillermo Comorera (ESP)
- Note: The Netherlands won after drawing of lots, but the Cup was awarded to Chile.

== Medalists ==
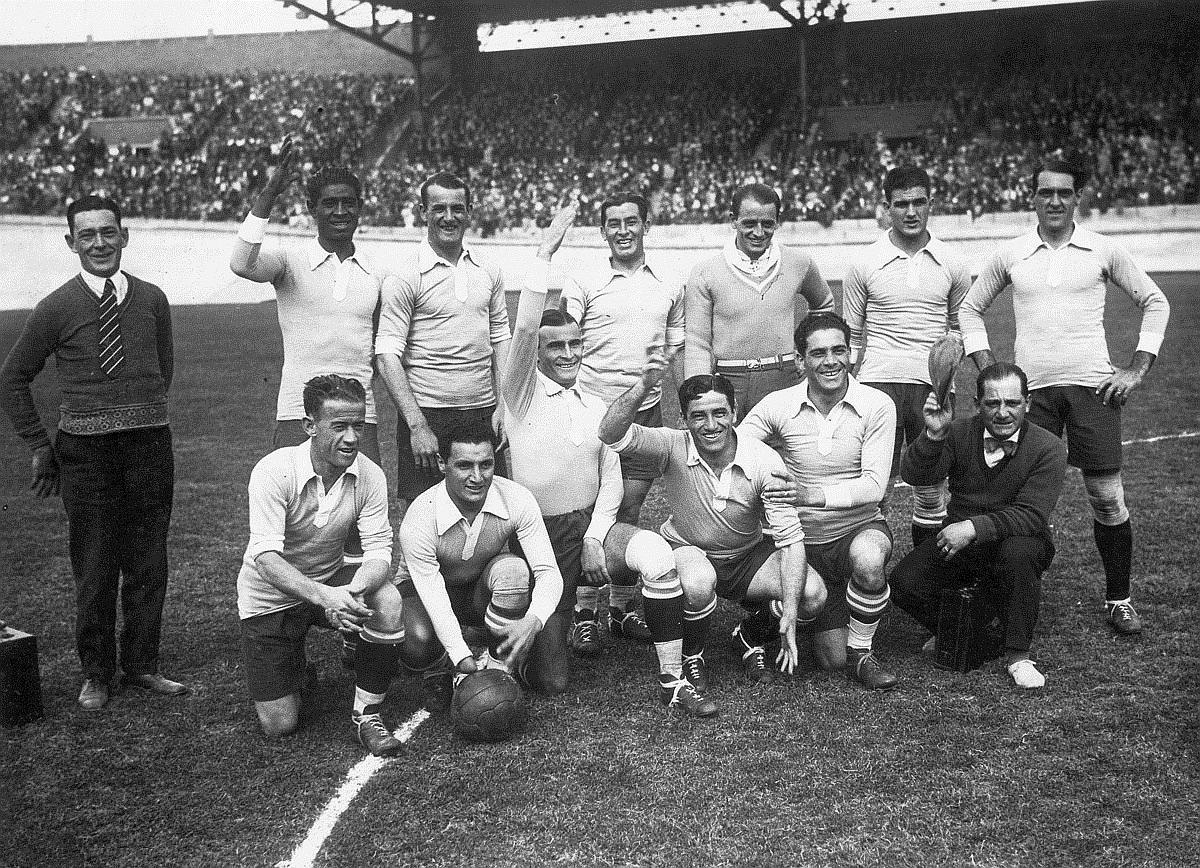
Uruguay, winner of the tournament

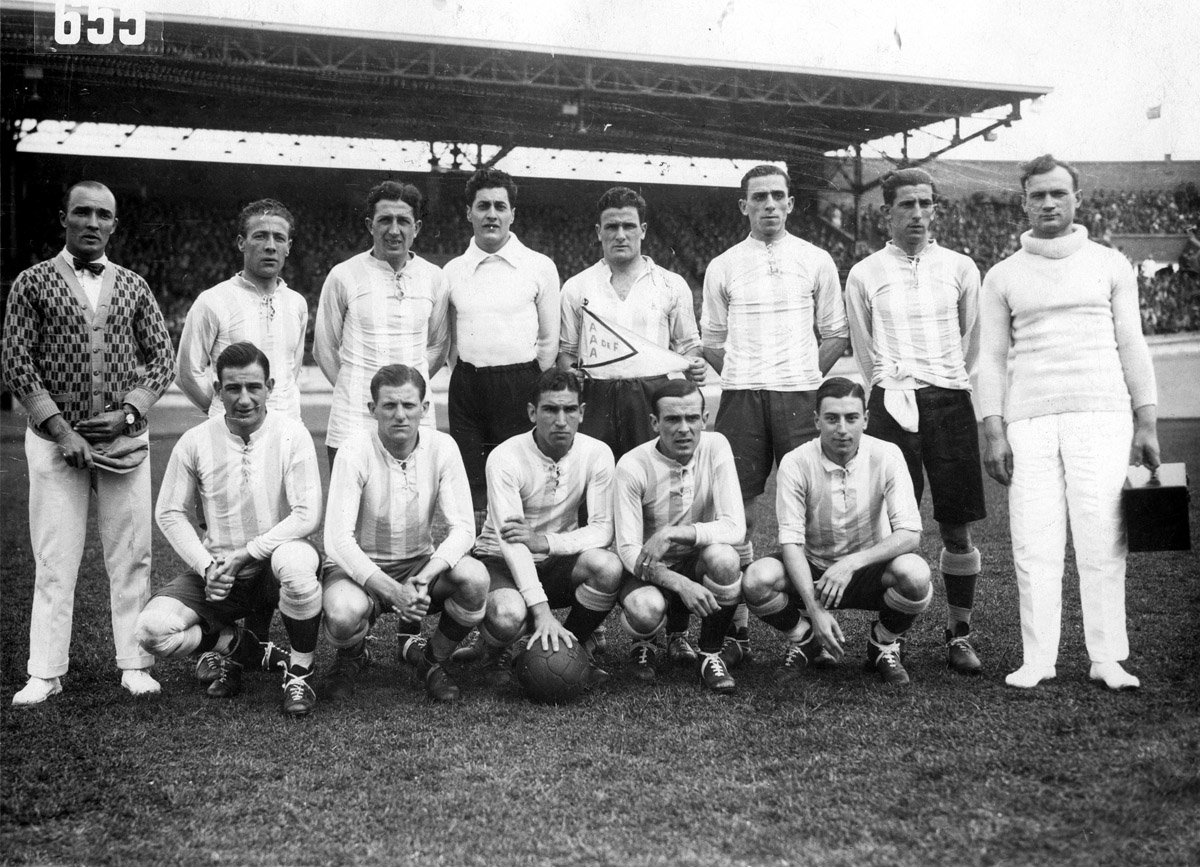
The Argentina team won the Silver Medal

Gold	Silver	Bronze
Uruguay José Andrade; Juan Peregrino Anselmo; Pedro Arispe; Juan Arremón; Venancio Bartibás; Fausto Batignani; René Borjas; Antonio Campolo; Adhemar Canavesi; Héctor Castro; Pedro Cea; Lorenzo Fernández; Roberto Figueroa; Álvaro Gestido; Andrés Mazali; Ángel Melogno; José Nasazzi; Pedro Petrone; Juan Piriz; Héctor Scarone; Domingo Tejera; Santos Urdinarán	Argentina Ludovico Bidoglio; Ángel Bossio; Saúl Calandra; Alfredo Carricaberry; Roberto Cherro; Octavio Díaz; Juan Evaristo; Manuel Ferreira; Enrique Gainzarain; Alberto Helman; Segundo Luna; Ángel Segundo Medici; Luis Monti; Pedro Ochoa; Rodolfo Orlandini; Raimundo Orsi; Fernando Paternoster; Feliciano Perducca; Natalio Perinetti; Domingo Tarasconi; Luis Weihmuller; Adolfo Zumelzú	Italy Elvio Banchero; Virgilio Felice Levratto; Pietro Pastore; Gino Rossetti; Attilio Ferraris; Enrico Rivolta; Felice Gasperi; Alfredo Pitto; Pietro Genovesi; Antonio Janni; Fulvio Bernardini; Silvio Pietroboni; Andrea Viviano; Delfo Bellini; Umberto Caligaris; Virginio Rosetta; Giampiero Combi; Giovanni De Prà; Adolfo Baloncieri; Mario Magnozzi; Angelo Schiavio; Valentino Degani

== Goalscorers ==
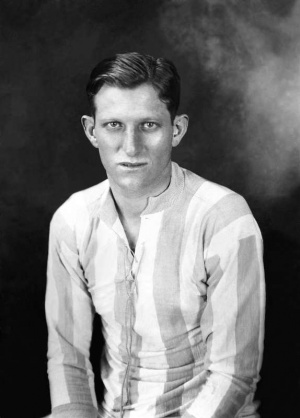
Top scorer Domingo Tarasconi of Argentina

11 goals

- Domingo Tarasconi (Argentina)

6 goals

- Manuel Ferreira (Argentina)
- Adolfo Baloncieri (Italy)

4 goals

- Roberto Cherro (Argentina)
- Raymond Braine (Belgium)
- Ali Riadh (Egypt)
- Mahmoud Mokhtar El Tetsh (Egypt)
- Richard Hofmann (Germany)
- Elvio Banchero (Italy)
- Virgilio Levratto (Italy)
- Mario Magnozzi (Italy)
- Angelo Schiavio (Italy)
- José Maria Yermo (Spain)
- Pedro Petrone (Uruguay)

3 goals

- Raimundo Orsi (Argentina)
- Jacques Moeschal (Belgium)
- Guillermo Subiabre (Chile)
- Vítor Silva (Portugal)
- Héctor Scarone (Uruguay)

2 goals

- Juste Brouzes (France)
- Leo Ghering (Netherlands)
- Felix Smeets (Netherlands)
- Pepe (Portugal)
- Luis Regueiro (Spain)

1 goal

- Luis Monti (Argentina)
- Florimond Vanhalme (Belgium)
- Louis Versyp (Belgium)
- Óscar Alfaro (Chile)
- Alejandro Carbonell (Chile)
- Manuel Bravo (Chile)
- Guillermo Saavedra (Chile)
- Moussa El-Ezam (Egypt)
- Ali El-Hassani (Egypt)
- Sayed Houda (Egypt)
- Gamil El-Zobair (Egypt)
- Robert Dauphin (France)
- Josef Hornauer (Germany)
- Fulvio Bernardini (Italy)
- Enrico Rivolta (Italy)
- Gino Rossetti (Italy)
- Guillaume Schütz (Luxembourg)
- Robert Theissen (Luxembourg)
- Jean-Pierre Weisgerber (Luxembourg)
- Juan Carreño (Mexico)
- Ernesto Sota (Mexico)
- Wim Tap (Netherlands)
- Valdemar Mota (Portugal)
- Augusto Silva (Portugal)
- Martín Marculeta (Spain)
- Ángel Mariscal (Spain)
- Domingo Zaldúa (Spain)
- Bekir Refet (Turkey)
- Henry Carroll (United States)
- Rudy Kuntner (United States)
- Antonio Campolo (Uruguay)
- Héctor Castro (Uruguay)
- Pedro Cea (Uruguay)
- Roberto Figueroa (Uruguay)
- Santos Urdinarán (Uruguay)
- (Kingdom of Yugoslavia) Mirko Bonačić (Kingdom of SCS)
