= Argentina at the FIFA World Cup =

International football delegation

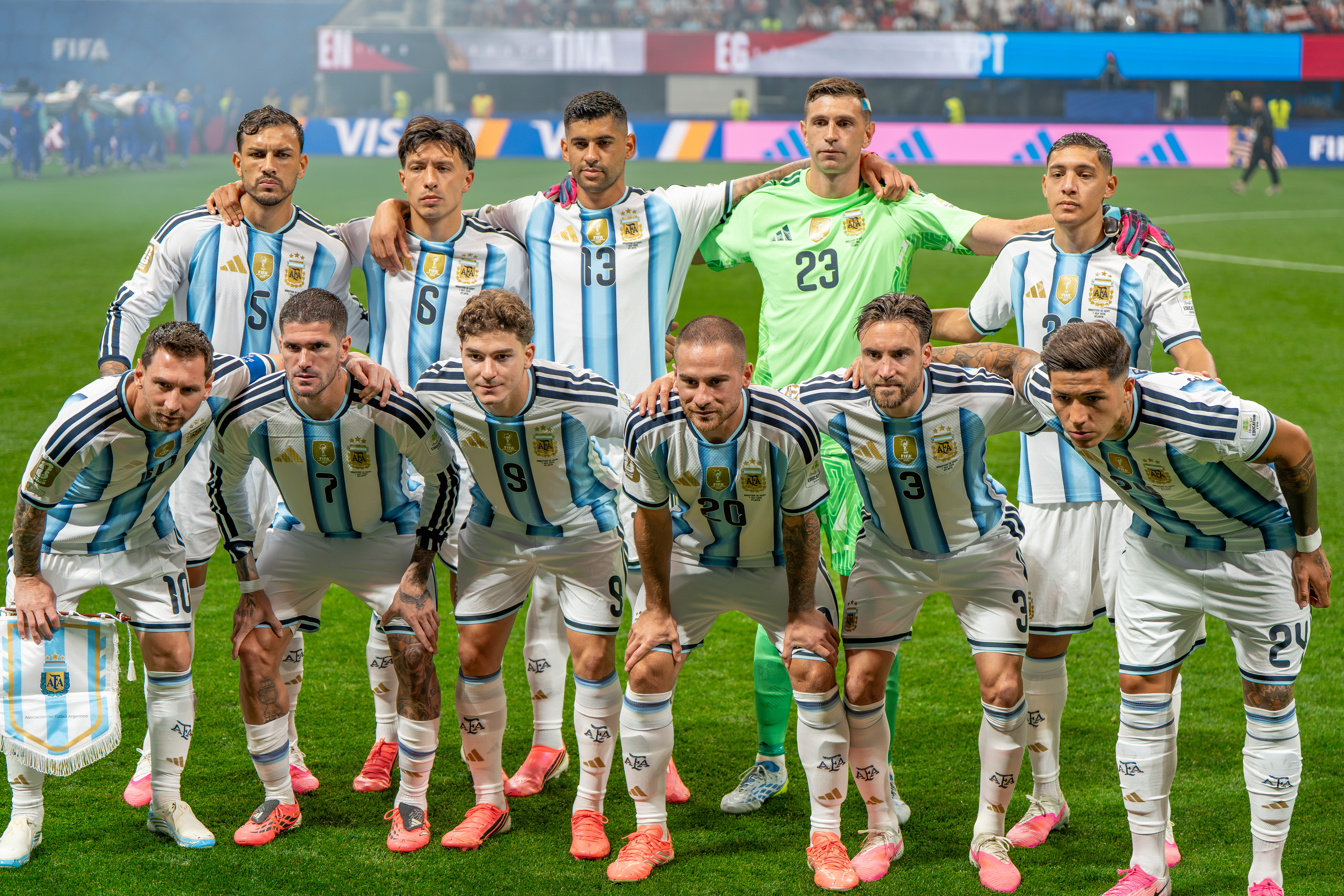
Argentina's starting lineup against Egypt at the 2026 FIFA World Cup

This is a record of Argentina's results at the FIFA World Cup. Argentina is one of the most successful teams in the tournament's history, having won three World Cups. Argentina won its first title as a host country in 1978, defeating the Netherlands 3–1 in the final. In 1986, Argentina won their second World Cup title after defeating West Germany 3–2 in the final. In 2022, Argentina won their third World Cup, after winning a penalty shoot-out against France following a 3–3 draw in the final. Argentina has also been runner-up four times, in 1930, 1990, 2014, and 2026.

In nineteen World Cup tournaments, Argentina has 54 victories in 96 matches. The team has been present in all but four of the World Cups, ranking behind only Brazil and Germany in total number of appearances.

== FIFA World Cup record ==
=== Overall record ===
Champions Runners-up Third place Fourth place Tournament played fully or partially on home soil

FIFA World Cup record									Qualification record					
Year	Round	Position	Pld	W	D*	L	GF	GA	Pld	W	D*	L	GF	GA
(Uruguay) 1930	**Runners-up**	**2nd**	**5**	**4**	**0**	**1**	**18**	**9**	Invited					
(Italy) 1934	Round of 16	9th	1	0	0	1	2	3	Qualified by opponent's withdrawal					
(France) 1938	Withdrew								Withdrew due to hosting disagreement					
(Brazil) 1950	Withdrew								Withdrew due to hosting disagreement					
(Switzerland) 1954	Withdrew								Withdrew due to political decision					
(Sweden) 1958	Group stage	13th	3	1	0	2	5	10	4	3	0	1	10	2
(Chile) 1962	Group stage	10th	3	1	1	1	2	3	2	2	0	0	11	3
(England) 1966	Quarter-finals	5th	4	2	1	1	4	2	4	3	1	0	9	2
(Mexico) 1970	Did not qualify								4	1	1	2	4	6
(West Germany) 1974	Second group stage	8th	6	1	2	3	9	12	4	3	1	0	9	2
(Argentina) 1978	**Champions**	**1st**	**7**	**5**	**1**	**1**	**15**	**4**	Qualified as hosts					
(Spain) 1982	Second group stage	11th	5	2	0	3	8	7	Qualified as defending champions					
(Mexico) 1986	**Champions**	**1st**	**7**	**6**	**1**	**0**	**14**	**5**	6	4	1	1	12	6
(Italy) 1990	**Runners-up**	**2nd**	**7**	**2**	**3**	**2**	**5**	**4**	Qualified as defending champions					
(United States) 1994	Round of 16	10th	4	2	0	2	8	6	8	4	2	2	9	10
(France) 1998	Quarter-finals	6th	5	3	1	1	10	4	16	8	6	2	23	13
(South Korea) (Japan) 2002	Group stage	18th	3	1	1	1	2	2	18	13	4	1	42	15
(Germany) 2006	Quarter-finals	6th	5	3	2	1	11	3	18	10	4	4	29	17
(South Africa) 2010	Quarter-finals	5th	5	4	0	1	10	6	18	8	4	6	23	20
(Brazil) 2014	**Runners-up**	**2nd**	**7**	**5**	**1**	**1**	**8**	**4**	16	9	5	2	35	15
(Russia) 2018	Round of 16	16th	4	1	1	2	6	9	18	7	7	4	19	16
(Qatar) 2022	**Champions**	**1st**	**7**	**4**	**2**	**1**	**15**	**8**	17	11	6	0	27	8
(Canada) (Mexico) (United States) 2026	**Runners-up**	**2nd**	**8**	**7**	**0**	**1**	**19**	**8**	18	12	2	4	31	10
(Morocco) (Portugal) (Spain) 2030	Qualified as centenary co-hosts								Qualified as centenary co-hosts					
(Saudi Arabia) 2034	To be determined								To be determined					
Total: 19/23	3 Titles		96	54	17	25	171	109	153	86	42	25	262	135

Argentina's World Cup record
First match	Argentina 1–0 France (15 July 1930; Montevideo, Uruguay)
Biggest win	Argentina 6–0 Peru (21 June 1978; Rosario, Argentina); Argentina 6–0 Serbia and Montenegro (16 June 2006; Gelsenkirchen, Germany)
Biggest defeat	Czechoslovakia 6–1 Argentina (15 June 1958; Helsingborg, Sweden)
Best result	**Champions** in 1978, 1986 and 2022
Worst result	Group stage in 1958, 1962 and 2002

=== Finals ===
Year	Manager(s)	Captain	Argentina scorers
1930	Francisco Olazar / Juan José Tramutola	Manuel Ferreira	Carlos Peucelle, Guillermo Stábile
1978	César Luis Menotti	Daniel Passarella	Mario Kempes (2), Daniel Bertoni
1986	Carlos Bilardo	Diego Maradona	José Luis Brown, Jorge Valdano, Jorge Burruchaga
1990	Carlos Bilardo	Diego Maradona	—
2014	Alejandro Sabella	Lionel Messi	—
2022	Lionel Scaloni	Lionel Messi	Lionel Messi (2), Ángel Di María
2026	Lionel Scaloni	Lionel Messi	—

=== By match ===
Year	Round	Opponent	Score	Venue	Argentina scorers
(Uruguay) 1930	Group 1	France	1–0	Parque Central, Montevideo	Monti
(Uruguay) 1930	Group 1	Mexico	6–3	Centenario, Montevideo	Stábile (3), Zumelzú (2), Varallo
(Uruguay) 1930	Group 1	Chile	3–1	Centenario, Montevideo	Stábile (2), Evaristo
(Uruguay) 1930	Semi-finals	United States	6–1	Centenario, Montevideo	Monti, Scopelli, Stábile (2), Peucelle (2)
(Uruguay) 1930	Final	Uruguay	2–4	Centenario, Montevideo	Peucelle, Stábile
(Italy) 1934	Round of 16	Sweden	2–3	Stadio Littoriale, Bologna	Belis, Galateo
(Sweden) 1958	Group 1	West Germany	1–3	Malmö Stadion, Malmö	Corbatta
(Sweden) 1958	Group 1	Northern Ireland	3–1	Örjans Vall, Halmstad	Corbatta, Menéndez, Avio
(Sweden) 1958	Group 1	Czechoslovakia	1–6	Olympiastadion, Helsingborg	Corbatta
(Chile) 1962	Group 4	Bulgaria	1–0	El Teniente, Rancagua	Facundo
(Chile) 1962	Group 4	England	1–3	El Teniente, Rancagua	Sanfilippo
(Chile) 1962	Group 4	Hungary	0–0	El Teniente, Rancagua	—
(England) 1966	Group 2	Spain	2–1	Villa Park, Birmingham	Artime (2)
(England) 1966	Group 2	West Germany	0–0	Villa Park, Birmingham	—
(England) 1966	Group 2	Switzerland	2–0	Hillsborough, Sheffield	Artime, Onega
(England) 1966	Quarter-finals	England	0–1	Wembley, London	—
(West Germany) 1974	Group 4	Poland	2–3	Neckarstadion, Stuttgart	Heredia, Babington
(West Germany) 1974	Group 4	Italy	1–1	Neckarstadion, Stuttgart	Houseman
(West Germany) 1974	Group 4	Haiti	4–1	Olympiastadion, Munich	Yazalde (2), Houseman, Ayala
(West Germany) 1974	Group A	Netherlands	0–4	Parkstadion, Gelsenkirchen	—
(West Germany) 1974	Group A	Brazil	1–2	Niedersachsenstadion, Hanover	Brindisi
(West Germany) 1974	Group A	East Germany	1–1	Parkstadion, Gelsenkirchen	Houseman
(Argentina) 1978	Group 1	Hungary	2–1	Monumental, Buenos Aires	Luque, Bertoni
(Argentina) 1978	Group 1	France	2–1	Monumental, Buenos Aires	Passarella, Luque
(Argentina) 1978	Group 1	Italy	0–1	Monumental, Buenos Aires	—
(Argentina) 1978	Group B	Poland	2–0	Gigante de Arroyito, Rosario	Kempes (2)
(Argentina) 1978	Group B	Brazil	0–0	Gigante de Arroyito, Rosario	—
(Argentina) 1978	Group B	Peru	6–0	Gigante de Arroyito, Rosario	Kempes (2), Tarantini, Luque (2), Houseman
(Argentina) 1978	Final	Netherlands	3–1 (a.e.t.)	Monumental, Buenos Aires	Kempes (2), Bertoni
(Spain) 1982	Group 3	Belgium	0–1	Camp Nou, Barcelona	—
(Spain) 1982	Group 3	Hungary	4–1	José Rico Pérez, Alicante	Bertoni, Maradona (2), Ardiles
(Spain) 1982	Group 3	El Salvador	2–0	José Rico Pérez, Alicante	Passarella, Bertoni
(Spain) 1982	Group C	Italy	1–2	Sarrià, Barcelona	Passarella
(Spain) 1982	Group C	Brazil	1–3	Sarrià, Barcelona	Díaz
(Mexico) 1986	Group A	South Korea	3–1	Estadio Olímpico Universitario, Mexico City	Valdano (2), Ruggeri
(Mexico) 1986	Group A	Italy	1–1	Cuauhtémoc, Puebla	Maradona
(Mexico) 1986	Group A	Bulgaria	2–0	Estadio Olímpico Universitario, Mexico City	Valdano, Burruchaga
(Mexico) 1986	Round of 16	Uruguay	1–0	Cuauhtémoc, Puebla	Pasculli
(Mexico) 1986	Quarter-finals	England	2–1	Estadio Azteca, Mexico City	Maradona (2)
(Mexico) 1986	Semi-finals	Belgium	2–0	Estadio Azteca, Mexico City	Maradona (2)
(Mexico) 1986	Final	West Germany	3–2	Estadio Azteca, Mexico City	Brown, Valdano, Burruchaga
(Italy) 1990	Group B	Cameroon	0–1	San Siro, Milan	—
(Italy) 1990	Group B	Soviet Union	2–0	San Paolo, Naples	Troglio, Burruchaga
(Italy) 1990	Group B	Romania	1–1	San Paolo, Naples	Monzón
(Italy) 1990	Round of 16	Brazil	1–0	Stadio Delle Alpi, Turin	Caniggia
(Italy) 1990	Quarter-finals	Yugoslavia	0–0 (a.e.t.) (3–2 p)	Artemio Franchi, Florence	—
(Italy) 1990	Semi-finals	Italy	1–1 (a.e.t.) (4–3 p)	San Paolo, Naples	Caniggia
(Italy) 1990	Final	West Germany	0–1	Olimpico, Rome	—
(United States) 1994	Group D	Greece	4–0	Foxboro Stadium, Foxborough	Batistuta (3), Maradona
(United States) 1994	Group D	Nigeria	2–1	Foxboro Stadium, Foxborough	Caniggia (2)
(United States) 1994	Group D	Bulgaria	0–2	Cotton Bowl, Dallas	—
(United States) 1994	Round of 16	Romania	2–3	Rose Bowl, Pasadena	Batistuta, Balbo
(France) 1998	Group H	Japan	1–0	Stadium Municipal, Toulouse	Batistuta
(France) 1998	Group H	Jamaica	5–0	Parc des Princes, Paris	Ortega (2), Batistuta (3)
(France) 1998	Group H	Croatia	1–0	Parc Lescure, Bordeaux	Pineda
(France) 1998	Round of 16	England	2–2 (a.e.t.) (4–3 p)	Geoffroy-Guichard, Saint-Étienne	Batistuta, Zanetti
(France) 1998	Quarter-finals	Netherlands	1–2	Vélodrome, Marseille	López (Note: Argentina's 100th World Cup goal)
(South Korea) (Japan) 2002	Group F	Nigeria	1–0	Kashima, Ibaraki prefecture	Batistuta
(South Korea) (Japan) 2002	Group F	England	0–1	Sapporo Dome, Sapporo	—
(South Korea) (Japan) 2002	Group F	Sweden	1–1	Miyagi, Rifu	Crespo
(Germany) 2006	Group C	Ivory Coast	2–1	Volksparkstadion, Hamburg	Crespo, Saviola
(Germany) 2006	Group C	Serbia and Montenegro	6–0	Arena AufSchalke, Gelsenkirchen	Rodríguez (2), Cambiasso, Crespo, Tevez, Messi
(Germany) 2006	Group C	Netherlands	0–0	Waldstadion, Frankfurt	—
(Germany) 2006	Round of 16	Mexico	2–1 (a.e.t.)	Zentralstadion, Leipzig	Crespo, Rodríguez
(Germany) 2006	Quarter-finals	Germany	1–1 (a.e.t.) (2–4 p)	Olympiastadion, Berlin	Ayala
(South Africa) 2010	Group B	Nigeria	1–0	Ellis Park, Johannesburg	Heinze
(South Africa) 2010	Group B	South Korea	4–1	Soccer City, Johannesburg	Park (o.g.), Higuaín (3)
(South Africa) 2010	Group B	Greece	2–0	Peter Mokaba, Polokwane	Demichelis, Palermo
(South Africa) 2010	Round of 16	Mexico	3–1	Soccer City, Johannesburg	Tevez (2), Higuaín
(South Africa) 2010	Quarter-finals	Germany	0–4	Green Point, Cape Town	—
(Brazil) 2014	Group F	Bosnia and Herzegovina	2–1	Maracanã, Rio de Janeiro	Kolašinac (o.g.), Messi
(Brazil) 2014	Group F	Iran	1–0	Mineirão, Belo Horizonte	Messi
(Brazil) 2014	Group F	Nigeria	3–2	Beira-Rio, Porto Alegre	Messi (2), Rojo
(Brazil) 2014	Round of 16	Switzerland	1–0 (a.e.t.)	Arena Corinthians, São Paulo	Di María
(Brazil) 2014	Quarter-finals	Belgium	1–0	Estádio Nacional, Brasília	Higuaín
(Brazil) 2014	Semi-finals	Netherlands	0–0 (a.e.t.) (4–2 p)	Arena Corinthians, São Paulo	—
(Brazil) 2014	Final	Germany	0–1 (a.e.t.)	Maracanã, Rio de Janeiro	—
(Russia) 2018	Group D	Iceland	1–1	Spartak Stadium, Moscow	Agüero
(Russia) 2018	Group D	Croatia	0–3	Nizhny Novgorod Stadium, Nizhny Novgorod	—
(Russia) 2018	Group D	Nigeria	2–1	Zenit Arena, Saint Petersburg	Messi, Rojo
(Russia) 2018	Round of 16	France	3–4	Kazan Arena, Kazan	Di María, Mercado, Agüero
(Qatar) 2022	Group C	Saudi Arabia	1–2	Lusail Stadium, Lusail	Messi
(Qatar) 2022	Group C	Mexico	2–0	Lusail Stadium, Lusail	Messi, Fernández
(Qatar) 2022	Group C	Poland	2–0	Stadium 974, Doha	Mac Allister, Alvarez
(Qatar) 2022	Round of 16	Australia	2–1	Ahmad bin Ali Stadium, Al Rayyan	Messi, Alvarez
(Qatar) 2022	Quarter-finals	Netherlands	2–2 (a.e.t.) (4–3 p)	Lusail Stadium, Lusail	Molina, Messi
(Qatar) 2022	Semi-finals	Croatia	3–0	Lusail Stadium, Lusail	Messi, Alvarez (2)
(Qatar) 2022	Final	France	3–3 (a.e.t.) (4–2 p)	Lusail Stadium, Lusail	Messi (2), Di María
(Canada) (Mexico) (United States) 2026	Group J	Algeria	3–0	Arrowhead Stadium, Kansas City	Messi (3)
(Canada) (Mexico) (United States) 2026	Group J	Austria	2–0	AT&T Stadium, Arlington	Messi (2)
(Canada) (Mexico) (United States) 2026	Group J	Jordan	3–1	AT&T Stadium, Arlington	Lo Celso, La. Martínez, Messi
(Canada) (Mexico) (United States) 2026	Round of 32	Cape Verde	3–2 (a.e.t.)	Hard Rock Stadium, Miami Gardens	Messi, Li. Martínez, Diney (o.g.)
(Canada) (Mexico) (United States) 2026	Round of 16	Egypt	3–2	Mercedes-Benz Stadium, Atlanta	Romero, Messi, Fernández
(Canada) (Mexico) (United States) 2026	Quarter-finals	Switzerland	3–1 (a.e.t.)	Arrowhead Stadium, Kansas City	Mac Allister, Alvarez, La. Martínez
(Canada) (Mexico) (United States) 2026	Semi-finals	England	2–1	Mercedes-Benz Stadium, Atlanta	Fernández, La. Martínez
(Canada) (Mexico) (United States) 2026	Final	Spain	0–1 (a.e.t.)	MetLife Stadium, East Rutherford	—
(Morocco) (Portugal) (Spain) 2030	TBA	TBA	v	Monumental, Buenos Aires	

=== By opponent ===
Argentina have played a total of 96 World Cup matches across 19 tournaments, facing 44 different opponents.

FIFA World Cup matches (by opponent)
Opponent	Pld	W	D	L	GF	GA	GD	Confederation
**France**	4	2	1	1	9	8	1	UEFA
Mexico	4	4	0	0	13	5	8	CONCACAF
Chile	1	1	0	0	3	1	2	CONMEBOL
United States	1	1	0	0	6	1	5	CONCACAF
**Uruguay**	2	1	0	1	3	4	−1	CONMEBOL
Sweden	2	0	1	1	3	4	−1	UEFA
**Germany** (Note: Includes appearances as West Germany)	7	1	2	4	5	12	−7	UEFA
Northern Ireland	1	1	0	0	3	1	2	UEFA
Czechoslovakia	1	0	0	1	1	6	−5	UEFA
Bulgaria	3	2	0	1	3	2	1	UEFA
**England**	6	2	1	3	7	9	−2	UEFA
Hungary	3	2	1	0	6	2	4	UEFA
**Spain**	2	1	0	1	2	2	0	UEFA
Switzerland	3	3	0	0	6	1	5	UEFA
Poland	3	2	0	1	6	3	3	UEFA
**Italy**	5	0	3	2	4	6	−2	UEFA
Haiti	1	1	0	0	4	1	3	CONCACAF
Netherlands	6	1	3	2	6	9	−3	UEFA
**Brazil**	4	1	1	2	3	5	−2	CONMEBOL
East Germany*	1	0	1	0	1	1	0	UEFA
Peru	1	1	0	0	6	0	6	CONMEBOL
Belgium	3	2	0	1	3	1	2	UEFA
El Salvador	1	1	0	0	2	0	2	CONCACAF
South Korea	2	2	0	0	7	2	5	AFC
Cameroon	1	0	0	1	0	1	−1	CAF
Soviet Union*	1	1	0	0	2	0	2	UEFA
Romania	2	0	1	1	3	4	−1	UEFA
Serbia (Note: Includes appearances as Yugoslavia and Serbia and Montenegro)	2	1	1	0	6	0	6	UEFA
Greece	2	2	0	0	6	0	6	UEFA
Nigeria	5	5	0	0	9	4	5	CAF
Japan	1	1	0	0	1	0	1	AFC
Jamaica	1	1	0	0	5	0	5	CONCACAF
Croatia	3	2	0	1	4	3	1	UEFA
Ivory Coast	1	1	0	0	2	1	1	CAF
Bosnia and Herzegovina	1	1	0	0	2	1	1	UEFA
Iran	1	1	0	0	1	0	1	AFC
Iceland	1	0	1	0	1	1	0	UEFA
Saudi Arabia	1	0	0	1	1	2	−1	AFC
Australia	1	1	0	0	2	1	1	AFC
Algeria	1	1	0	0	3	0	3	CAF
Austria	1	1	0	0	2	0	2	UEFA
Jordan	1	1	0	0	3	1	2	AFC
Cape Verde	1	1	0	0	3	2	1	CAF
Egypt	1	1	0	0	3	2	1	CAF

- Teams in **bold** denote previous World Cup winners, teams in italics denote sides that made their tournament debut against Argentina.
- Teams with a * mark no longer exist; East Germany was annexed to Germany, and the Soviet Union now plays as Russia.

=== By confederation ===
FIFA delegates regional qualification and other organizational affairs to continental conferences, with six different groups separated by geographical location. Argentina plays in CONMEBOL, the confederation for South American teams. Due to World Cup rules that state two teams from the same confederation cannot be in the same group for the first round (with the exception of European UEFA sides), Argentina commonly faces teams from outside their region, including Europe, Africa and Asia. However, the Argentine national team has never played against an Oceanian (OFC) side at the World Cup.

FIFA World Cup matches (by confederation)
Confederation	Opponents	Total	Wins	Draws	Losses	GF	GA	GD
AFC	Australia; Iran; Japan; Jordan; Saudi Arabia; South Korea	7	6	0	1	15	6	+9
CAF	Algeria; Cameroon; Cape Verde; Egypt; Ivory Coast; Nigeria	10	9	0	1	20	10	+10
CONCACAF	El Salvador; Haiti; Jamaica; Mexico; United States	8	8	0	0	30	7	+23
CONMEBOL	Brazil; Chile; Peru; Uruguay	8	4	1	3	15	10	+5
OFC	/	0	0	0	0	0	0	0
UEFA	Austria; Belgium; Bosnia and Herzegovina; Bulgaria; Croatia; Czechoslovakia; East Germany; England; France; Germany; Greece; Hungary; Iceland; Italy; Netherlands; Northern Ireland; Poland; Romania; Serbia; Soviet Union; Spain; Sweden; Switzerland	63	27	16	20	91	77	+14

== World Cup Finals ==
=== 1930 v Uruguay ===
The inaugural FIFA World Cup tournament culminated with Argentina facing hosts and reigning Olympic champions Uruguay. The match was turned twice: Argentina went into half-time with a 2–1 lead in spite of an early goal for Uruguay, but the hosts ultimately won 4–2. Guillermo Stábile, who recorded Argentina's second goal in the match, finished as the tournament's top scorer with eight goals in total.

30 July 1930
14:15 UYT (UTC-03:30)

Uruguay	4–2	Argentina
Dorado 12'; Cea 57'; Iriarte 68'; Castro 89'	Report	Peucelle 20'; Stábile 37'

Estadio Centenario, Montevideo
Attendance: 68,346
Referee: John Langenus (Belgium)

Uruguay	Argentina

GK	Enrique Ballestrero
RB	José Nasazzi (c)
LB	Ernesto Mascheroni
RH	José Andrade
CH	Lorenzo Fernández
LH	Álvaro Gestido
OR	Pablo Dorado
IR	Héctor Scarone
CF	Héctor Castro
IL	Pedro Cea
OL	Santos Iriarte
Manager:
Alberto Suppici

GK	Juan Botasso
RB	José Della Torre
LB	Fernando Paternoster
RH	Juan Evaristo
CH	Luis Monti
LH	Pedro Suárez
OR	Carlos Peucelle
IR	Francisco Varallo
CF	Guillermo Stábile
IL	Manuel Ferreira (c)
OL	Mario Evaristo
Managers:
Francisco Olazar; Juan José Tramutola

=== 1978 v Netherlands ===
Argentina hosted the 1978 edition of the World Cup and reached the final for a second time. Their opponents the Netherlands had already played the previous 1974 final in West Germany, and also lost to the hosts.

Diego Maradona was 17 years old at this point and already a star in his home country, but did not make the squad as coach César Luis Menotti felt he was too inexperienced to handle the pressure of a major tournament. The playmaker position was instead filled by Mario Kempes, who became the first Argentinian to win the Golden Ball in addition to being the tournament's top scorer with six goals. The Dutch side was missing a superstar of their own: Johan Cruyff did not join the 1978 World Cup squad due to the aftermath of a kidnapping attempt which occurred in 1977; he only disclosed this information 30 years later.

The closely contested match was influenced by a hostile atmosphere and ended with the Dutch players refusing to attend the award ceremony after Argentina won the title in extra time.

25 June 1978
15:00 UTC−3

Argentina	3–1 (a.e.t.)	Netherlands
Kempes 38', 105'; Bertoni 115'	Report	Nanninga 82'

Estadio Monumental, Buenos Aires
Attendance: 71,483
Referee: Sergio Gonella (Italy)

Argentina	Netherlands

GK	5	Ubaldo Fillol
RB	15	Jorge Olguín
CB	7	Luis Galván
CB	19	Daniel Passarella (c)
LB	20	Alberto Tarantini
DM	6	Américo Gallego
CM	2	Osvaldo Ardiles	(yellow card) 40'	(substituted off) 66'
AM	10	Mario Kempes
RW	4	Daniel Bertoni
LW	16	Oscar Ortiz		(substituted off) 75'
CF	14	Leopoldo Luque
Substitutes:
MF	1	Norberto Alonso
GK	3	Héctor Baley
MF	8	Rubén Galván
MF	9	René Houseman		(substituted on) 75'
MF	12	Omar Larrosa	(yellow card) 93'	(substituted on) 66'
Manager:
César Luis Menotti

GK	8	Jan Jongbloed
SW	5	Ruud Krol (c)	(yellow card) 15'
RB	6	Wim Jansen		(substituted off) 75'
CB	22	Ernie Brandts
LB	2	Jan Poortvliet	(yellow card) 96'
RM	13	Johan Neeskens
CM	9	Arie Haan
LM	11	Willy van de Kerkhof
RF	10	René van de Kerkhof
CF	16	Johnny Rep		(substituted off) 58'
LF	12	Rob Rensenbrink
Substitutes:
DF	4	Adrie van Kraay
DF	17	Wim Rijsbergen
FW	18	Dick Nanninga		(substituted on) 58'
GK	19	Pim Doesburg
DF	20	Wim Suurbier	(yellow card) 94'	(substituted on) 75'
Manager:
(Austria) Ernst Happel

=== 1986 v West Germany ===
Eight years after the victory on home soil, Argentina won the World Cup for a second time. Diego Maradona was voted Best Player of the tournament after scoring five goals and assisting Jorge Burruchaga's winner against West Germany in the 84th minute of the final, which was won 3–2 by Argentina. The match was played in front of a record attendance of 114,600 people.

29 June 1986
12:00 CST

Argentina	3–2	West Germany
Brown 23'; Valdano 56'; Burruchaga 84'	Report	Rummenigge 74'; Völler 81'

Estadio Azteca, Mexico City
Attendance: 114,600
Referee: Romualdo Arppi Filho (Brazil)

Argentina	West Germany

GK	18	Nery Pumpido	(yellow card) 85'
SW	5	José Luis Brown
CB	9	José Luis Cuciuffo
CB	19	Oscar Ruggeri
RWB	14	Ricardo Giusti
LWB	16	Julio Olarticoechea	(yellow card) 77'
DM	2	Sergio Batista
CM	7	Jorge Burruchaga		(substituted off) 90'
CM	12	Héctor Enrique	(yellow card) 81'
SS	10	Diego Maradona (c)	(yellow card) 17'
CF	11	Jorge Valdano
Substitutions:
MF	21	Marcelo Trobbiani		(substituted on) 90'
Manager:
Carlos Bilardo

GK	1	Harald Schumacher
SW	17	Ditmar Jakobs
CB	3	Andreas Brehme
CB	4	Karlheinz Förster
RWB	14	Thomas Berthold
LWB	2	Hans-Peter Briegel	(yellow card) 62'
CM	6	Norbert Eder
CM	8	Lothar Matthäus	(yellow card) 21'
AM	10	Felix Magath		(substituted off) 62'
CF	11	Karl-Heinz Rummenigge (c)
CF	19	Klaus Allofs		(substituted off) 46'
Substitutions:
FW	9	Rudi Völler		(substituted on) 46'
FW	20	Dieter Hoeneß		(substituted on) 62'
Manager:
Franz Beckenbauer

=== 1990 v West Germany ===
In 1990, Argentina faced West Germany in a repeat of the 1986 edition. Pedro Monzón became the first player ever to be sent off in a World Cup final, but was later joined by teammate Gustavo Dezotti. The match was decided by a late penalty kick in favour of West Germany.

8 July 1990
20:00 UTC+2

West Germany	1–0	Argentina
Brehme 85' (pen.)	Report

Stadio Olimpico, Rome
Attendance: 73,603
Referee: Edgardo Codesal (Mexico)

West Germany	Argentina

GK	1	Bodo Illgner
SW	5	Klaus Augenthaler
CB	6	Guido Buchwald
CB	4	Jürgen Kohler
RWB	14	Thomas Berthold		(substituted off) 73'
LWB	3	Andreas Brehme
CM	8	Thomas Häßler
CM	10	Lothar Matthäus (c)
CM	7	Pierre Littbarski
CF	9	Rudi Völler	(yellow card) 52'
CF	18	Jürgen Klinsmann
Substitutes:
GK	12	Raimond Aumann
DF	2	Stefan Reuter		(substituted on) 73'
MF	15	Uwe Bein
MF	20	Olaf Thon
FW	13	Karl-Heinz Riedle
Manager:
Franz Beckenbauer

GK	12	Sergio Goycochea
SW	20	Juan Simón
CB	18	José Serrizuela
CB	19	Oscar Ruggeri		(substituted off) 46'
RWB	4	José Basualdo
LWB	17	Roberto Sensini
DM	13	Néstor Lorenzo
CM	7	Jorge Burruchaga		(substituted off) 53'
CM	21	Pedro Troglio	(yellow card) 84'
SS	10	Diego Maradona (c)	(yellow card) 87'
CF	9	Gustavo Dezotti	(yellow card) 5' (red card) 87'
Substitutes:
GK	22	Fabián Cancelarich
DF	5	Edgardo Bauza
DF	15	Pedro Monzón	(red card) 65'	(substituted on) 46'
MF	6	Gabriel Calderón		(substituted on) 53'
FW	3	Abel Balbo
Manager:
Carlos Bilardo

=== 2014 v Germany ===
In 2014, Argentina reached a fifth World Cup final, and for the third time faced Germany, making it the most recurrent meeting for a final. In spite of a number of chances on both sides, regular time finished goalless. In the second half of extra time, substitute striker Mario Götze scored the decisive goal for Germany.

13 July 2014
16:00 BRT (UTC−3)

Germany	1–0 (a.e.t.)	Argentina
Götze 113'

Maracanã Stadium, Rio de Janeiro
Attendance: 74,738
Referee: Nicola Rizzoli (Italy)

Germany	Argentina

GK	1	Manuel Neuer
RB	16	Philipp Lahm (c)
CB	20	Jérôme Boateng
CB	5	Mats Hummels
LB	4	Benedikt Höwedes	(yellow card) 34'
RM	23	Christoph Kramer		(substituted off) 32'
CM	7	Bastian Schweinsteiger	(yellow card) 29'
LM	18	Toni Kroos
RF	13	Thomas Müller
CF	11	Miroslav Klose		(substituted off) 88'
LF	8	Mesut Özil		(substituted off) 120'
Substitutions:
FW	9	André Schürrle		(substituted on) 32'
MF	19	Mario Götze		(substituted on) 88'
DF	17	Per Mertesacker		(substituted on) 120'
Manager:
Joachim Löw

GK	1	Sergio Romero
RB	4	Pablo Zabaleta
CB	15	Martín Demichelis
CB	2	Ezequiel Garay
LB	16	Marcos Rojo
CM	14	Javier Mascherano	(yellow card) 64'
CM	6	Lucas Biglia
RW	8	Enzo Pérez		(substituted off) 86'
AM	10	Lionel Messi (c)
LW	22	Ezequiel Lavezzi		(substituted off) 46'
CF	9	Gonzalo Higuaín		(substituted off) 78'
Substitutions:
FW	20	Sergio Agüero	(yellow card) 65'	(substituted on) 46'
FW	18	Rodrigo Palacio		(substituted on) 78'
MF	5	Fernando Gago		(substituted on) 86'
Manager:
Alejandro Sabella

Man of the Match:
Mario Götze (Germany)

Assistant referees:
Renato Faverani (Italy)
Andrea Stefani (Italy)
Fourth official:
Carlos Vera (Ecuador)
Fifth official:
Christian Lescano (Ecuador)

=== 2022 v France ===
After reaching their sixth World Cup final, Argentina took the lead against France through captain Lionel Messi from the penalty spot, and doubled their advantage with an Ángel Di María goal in the 36th minute. France made two substitutions in the first half, but went into half-time trailing 0–2. Despite not having a shot until after the 80th minute, France were awarded a penalty after Randal Kolo Muani was brought down in the area. Kylian Mbappé would convert the penalty for France, and added a second goal less than two minutes later to level the score. Since regulation time ended with the score 2–2, the match went to extra time. Messi again scored for Argentina in 108th minute to restore Argentina's lead. However, Mbappé was then awarded a second penalty in the 118th minute after his initial shot hit the arm of Argentine defender Gonzalo Montiel. Mbappé converted the penalty to again tie the game, becoming the second ever player to score a hat-trick in the final of a men's World Cup. With extra time concluding and the score at 3–3, the match went to a penalty shoot-out; Argentina emerged victorious after scoring all of their penalties, winning the shoot-out 4–2.

18 December 2022
18:00

Argentina	3–3 (a.e.t.)	France
Messi 23' (pen.), 108'; Di María 36'		Mbappé 80' (pen.), 81', 118' (pen.)
Penalties
Messi (penalty scored); Dybala (penalty scored); Paredes (penalty scored); Montiel (penalty scored)	4–2	(penalty scored) Mbappé; (penalty missed) Coman; (penalty missed) Tchouaméni; (penalty scored) Kolo Muani

Lusail Stadium, Lusail
Attendance: 88,966
Referee: Szymon Marciniak (Poland)

Argentina	France

GK	23	Emiliano Martínez	(yellow card) PSO
RB	26	Nahuel Molina		(substituted off) 91'
CB	13	Cristian Romero
CB	19	Nicolás Otamendi
LB	3	Nicolás Tagliafico		(substituted off) 120+1'
DM	24	Enzo Fernández	(yellow card) 45+7'
CM	20	Alexis Mac Allister		(substituted off) 116'
CM	7	Rodrigo De Paul		(substituted off) 102'
RF	10	Lionel Messi (c)
CF	9	Julián Alvarez		(substituted off) 102'
LF	11	Ángel Di María		(substituted off) 64'
Substitutions:
MF	8	Marcos Acuña	(yellow card) 90+8'	(substituted on) 64'
DF	4	Gonzalo Montiel	(yellow card) 116'	(substituted on) 91'
MF	5	Leandro Paredes	(yellow card) 114'	(substituted on) 102'
FW	22	Lautaro Martínez		(substituted on) 102'
DF	6	Germán Pezzella		(substituted on) 116'
FW	21	Paulo Dybala		(substituted on) 120+1'
Manager:
Lionel Scaloni

GK	1	Hugo Lloris (c)
RB	5	Jules Koundé		(substituted off) 120+1'
CB	4	Raphaël Varane		(substituted off) 113'
CB	18	Dayot Upamecano
LB	22	Théo Hernandez		(substituted off) 71'
CM	8	Aurélien Tchouaméni
CM	14	Adrien Rabiot	(yellow card) 55'	(substituted off) 96' (Note: Rabiot suffered a knock to the head in the 94th minute. Therefore, his substitution for Fofana fell under FIFA's "concussion protocol", which allows a player at risk of a concussion to be substituted without taking account either the substitution window nor the amount of players already substituted.)
RW	11	Ousmane Dembélé		(substituted off) 41'
AM	7	Antoine Griezmann		(substituted off) 71'
LW	10	Kylian Mbappé
CF	9	Olivier Giroud	(yellow card) 90+5'	(substituted off) 41'
Substitutions:
FW	12	Randal Kolo Muani		(substituted on) 41'
FW	26	Marcus Thuram	(yellow card) 87'	(substituted on) 41'
FW	20	Kingsley Coman		(substituted on) 71'
MF	25	Eduardo Camavinga		(substituted on) 71'
MF	13	Youssouf Fofana		(substituted on) 96'
DF	24	Ibrahima Konaté		(substituted on) 113'
DF	3	Axel Disasi		(substituted on) 120+1'
Manager:
Didier Deschamps

Man of the Match:
Lionel Messi (Argentina)

Assistant referees:
Paweł Sokolnicki (Poland)
Tomasz Listkiewicz (Poland)
Fourth official:
Ismail Elfath (United States)
Reserve assistant referee:
Kathryn Nesbitt (United States)
Video assistant referee:
Tomasz Kwiatkowski (Poland)
Assistant video assistant referees:
Juan Soto (Venezuela)
Kyle Atkins (United States)
Fernando Guerrero (Mexico)
Stand-by video assistant referee:
Bastian Dankert (Germany)
Stand-by assistant video assistant referee:
Corey Parker (United States)

=== 2026 v Spain ===
July 19, 2026
3:00 p.m. UTC−4

Spain	1–0 (a.e.t.)	Argentina
Torres 106'	(Note: "Spain vs Argentina | Final | FIFA World Cup 2026". FIFA. Retrieved July 19, 2026.; "Match Report – Final – Spain v. Argentina". FIFA. July 19, 2026. Retrieved July 19, 2026.; "Post match summary report – Final – Spain v. Argentina". FIFA. July 20, 2026. Retrieved July 20, 2026.)

MetLife Stadium, East Rutherford
Attendance: 80,663
Referee: Slavko Vinčić (Slovenia)

Spain	Argentina

GK	23	Unai Simón
RB	12	Pedro Porro
CB	22	Pau Cubarsí
CB	14	Aymeric Laporte	(substituted off) 99'
LB	24	Marc Cucurella
DM	16	Rodri (c)	(substituted off) 99'
CM	10	Dani Olmo	(substituted off) 75'
CM	8	Fabián Ruiz	(substituted off) 62'
RF	19	Lamine Yamal
CF	21	Mikel Oyarzabal	(substituted off) 62'
LF	15	Álex Baena	(substituted off) 75'
Substitutions:
FW	7	Ferran Torres	(substituted on) 62'
MF	20	Pedri	(substituted on) 62'
MF	6	Mikel Merino	(substituted on) 75'
FW	17	Nico Williams	(substituted on) 75'
MF	18	Martín Zubimendi	(substituted on) 99'
DF	4	Eric Garcia	(substituted on) 99'
Manager:
Luis de la Fuente

GK	23	Emiliano Martínez
RB	4	Gonzalo Montiel		(substituted off) 58'
CB	13	Cristian Romero	(yellow card) 90+2'	(substituted off) 70'
CB	6	Lisandro Martínez	(yellow card) 41'	(substituted off) 44'
LB	3	Nicolás Tagliafico
RM	7	Rodrigo De Paul		(substituted off) 70'
CM	24	Enzo Fernández	(yellow card) 82' (yellow-red card) 90+3'
CM	20	Alexis Mac Allister	(yellow card) 111'
LM	15	Nicolás González		(substituted off) 46'
CF	10	Lionel Messi (c)
CF	9	Julián Alvarez		(substituted off) 102'
Substitutions:
DF	19	Nicolás Otamendi		(substituted on) 44'
MF	5	Leandro Paredes	(yellow card) 52'	(substituted on) 46'
DF	26	Nahuel Molina		(substituted on) 58'
DF	25	Facundo Medina		(substituted on) 70'
FW	17	Giuliano Simeone		(substituted on) 70'
DF	2	Marcos Senesi		(substituted on) 102'
Manager:
Lionel Scaloni			(yellow card) 105'

Man of the Match:
Ferran Torres (Spain)

Assistant referees:
Tomaž Klančnik (Slovenia)
Andraž Kovačič (Slovenia)
Fourth official:
Adham Makhadmeh (Jordan)
Reserve assistant referee:
Mohammad Al-Kalaf (Jordan)
Video assistant referee:
Bastian Dankert (Germany)
Assistant video assistant referee:
Nicolás Gallo (Colombia)
Support video assistant referee:
Khamis Al-Marri (Qatar)

== Head coaches ==
Throughout the team's history, several coaches have managed the Argentina national side with different football styles and ranges in offensive and defensive tactics. There were two predominant "football schools" taught by Argentina's World Cup-winning coaches: César Menotti, who propagated possession and well-look play, and Carlos Bilardo, who prioritized results and tactical order. These head coaching styles divided Argentine fans kindly. Other managers such as Marcelo Bielsa had their own football style. The following table lists every Argentina coach's record with the side at the World Cup finals and in the qualifying stages.

By tournament		At FIFA World Cup						In qualification						Total					
Coach	Year	Pld	W	D	L	W %	Pts %	Pld	W	D	L	W %	Pts %	Pld	W	D	L	W %	Pts %
Francisco Olazar Juan José Tramutola	(Uruguay) 1930	5	4	0	1	80%	80%	Qualified as invitees						5	4	0	1	80%	80%
Felipe Pascucci	(Italy) 1934	1	0	0	1	0%	0%	Qualified automatically						1	0	0	1	0%	0%
Guillermo Stábile	(Sweden) 1958	3	1	0	2	33.3%	33.3%	4	3	0	1	75%	75%	9	6	0	3	66.6%	66.6%
Guillermo Stábile	(Chile) 1962	Only managed in qualifiers						2	2	0	0	100%	100%	9	6	0	3	66.6%	66.6%
Juan Carlos Lorenzo	(Chile) 1962	3	1	1	1	33.3%	50%	Only managed in final tournament						7	3	2	2	42.9%	57.1%
Juan Carlos Lorenzo	(England) 1966	4	2	1	1	50%	62.5%	Only managed in final tournament						7	3	2	2	42.9%	57.1%
José María Minella	(England) 1966	Only managed in qualifiers						4	3	1	0	75%	87.5%	4	3	1	0	75%	87.5%
Adolfo Pedernera	(Mexico) 1970	Did not qualify						4	1	1	2	25%	37.5%	4	1	1	2	25%	37.5%
Omar Sívori	(West Germany) 1974	Only managed in qualifiers						4	3	1	0	75%	87.5%	4	3	1	0	75%	87.5%
Vladislao Cap	(West Germany) 1974	6	1	2	3	16.7%	33.3%	Only managed in final tournament						6	1	2	3	16.7%	33.3%
César Menotti	(Argentina) 1978	7	5	1	1	71.4%	78.6%	Qualified as hosts						12	7	1	4	58.3%	62.5%
César Menotti	(Spain) 1982	5	2	0	3	40%	40%	Qualified as defending champions						12	7	1	4	58.3%	62.5%
Carlos Bilardo	(Mexico) 1986	7	6	1	0	85.7%	92.9%	6	4	1	1	66.7%	75%	20	14	3	3	70%	75%
Carlos Bilardo	(Italy) 1990	7	4	1	2	57.1%	61.9%	Qualified as defending champions						20	14	3	3	70%	75%
Alfio Basile	(United States) 1994	4	2	0	2	50%	50%	8	4	2	2	50%	62.5%	12	6	2	4	42.9%	52.4%
Alfio Basile	(South Africa) 2010	Only managed in qualifiers						10	4	4	2	40%	53.3%	12	6	2	4	42.9%	52.4%
Daniel Passarella	(France) 1998	5	3	1	1	80%	80%	16	8	6	2	50%	62.5%	21	12	6	3	57.1%	66.6%
Marcelo Bielsa	(South Korea) (Japan) 2002	3	1	1	1	33.3%	44.4%	18	13	4	1	72.2%	79.6%	18	13	4	1	66.7%	74.6%
José Pekerman	(Germany) 2006	5	3	2	0	60%	73.3%	18	10	4	4	55.5%	62.9%	23	13	5	5	56.5%	63.7%
Diego Maradona	(South Africa) 2010	5	4	0	1	80%	80%	8	4	0	4	50%	50%	13	8	0	5	61.5%	61.2%
Alejandro Sabella	(Brazil) 2014	7	6	0	1	85.7%	85.7%	16	10	4	2	62.5%	70.8%	23	16	4	3	69.5%	75.3%
Gerardo Martino	(Russia) 2018	Only managed in qualifiers						6	3	2	1	50%	61.1%	6	3	2	1	50%	61.1%
Edgardo Bauza	(Russia) 2018	Only managed in qualifiers						8	3	2	3	37.5%	45.8%	8	3	2	3	37.5%	45.8%
Jorge Sampaoli	(Russia) 2018	4	1	1	2	25%	33.3%	4	1	3	0	25%	50%	8	2	4	2	25%	41.7%
Lionel Scaloni	(Qatar) 2022	7	4	2	1	57.1%	66.7%	17	11	6	0	64.7%	76.5%	50	34	10	6	68%	74.7%
Lionel Scaloni	(Canada) (Mexico) (United States) 2026	8	7	0	1	87.5%	87.5%	18	12	2	4	66.7%	70.4%	50	34	10	6	68%	74.7%

From 1994 onwards, three points are given for a win; previous wins are two points.

== Player records ==
=== Most appearances ===
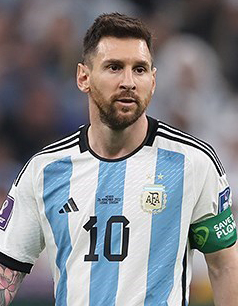
Lionel Messi holds the World Cup record for appearances.

Lionel Messi has captained the team in 26 World Cup matches. Messi's total of 34 appearances is both a record for Argentina and the most for any player at the FIFA World Cup.

Rank	Player	Matches	World Cups
1	Lionel Messi	34	2006, 2010, 2014, 2018, 2022 and 2026
2	Diego Maradona	21	1982, 1986, 1990 and 1994
2	Nicolás Otamendi	21	2010, 2018, 2022 and 2026
4	Javier Mascherano	20	2006, 2010, 2014 and 2018
5	Mario Kempes	18	1974, 1978 and 1982
5	Ángel Di María	18	2010, 2014, 2018 and 2022
7	Nicolás Tagliafico	17	2018, 2022 and 2026
8	Oscar Ruggeri	16	1986, 1990 and 1994
9	Julián Alvarez	15	2022 and 2026
9	Emiliano Martínez	15	2022 and 2026

=== Top goalscorers ===
Rank	Player	Goals	World Cups
1	Lionel Messi	21	2006 (1), 2014 (4), 2018 (1), 2022 (7) and 2026 (8)
2	Gabriel Batistuta	10	1994 (4), 1998 (5) and 2002 (1)
3	Guillermo Stábile	8	1930
3	Diego Maradona	8	1982 (2), 1986 (5) and 1994 (1)
5	Mario Kempes	6	1978
6	Gonzalo Higuaín	5	2010 (4) and 2014 (1)
6	Julián Alvarez	5	2022 (4) and 2026 (1)
8	Six players	4	

=== Goalscoring by tournament ===
World Cup	Goalscorer(s)
1930	Guillermo Stábile (8), Carlos Peucelle (3), Luis Monti (2), Adolfo Zumelzú (2), Mario Evaristo, Alejandro Scopelli, Francisco Varallo
1934	Ernesto Belis, Alberto Galateo
1958	Omar Corbatta (3), Ludovico Avio, Norberto Menéndez
1962	Héctor Facundo, José Sanfilippo
1966	Luis Artime (3), Ermindo Onega
1974	René Houseman (3), Héctor Yazalde (2), Rubén Ayala, Carlos Babington, Miguel Ángel Brindisi, Ramón Heredia
1978	Mario Kempes (6), Leopoldo Luque (4), Daniel Bertoni (2), René Houseman, Daniel Passarella, Alberto Tarantini
1982	Daniel Bertoni (2), Diego Maradona (2), Daniel Passarella (2), Osvaldo Ardiles, Ramón Díaz
1986	Diego Maradona (5), Jorge Valdano (4), Jorge Burruchaga (2), José Luis Brown, Pedro Pasculli, Oscar Ruggeri
1990	Claudio Caniggia (2), Jorge Burruchaga, Pedro Monzón, Pedro Troglio
1994	Gabriel Batistuta (4), Claudio Caniggia (2), Abel Balbo, Diego Maradona
1998	Gabriel Batistuta (5), Ariel Ortega (2), Claudio López, Mauricio Pineda, Javier Zanetti
2002	Gabriel Batistuta, Hernán Crespo
2006	Hernán Crespo (3), Maxi Rodríguez (3), Roberto Ayala, Esteban Cambiasso, Lionel Messi, Javier Saviola, Carlos Tevez
2010	Gonzalo Higuaín (4), Carlos Tevez (2), Martin Demichelis, Gabriel Heinze, Martin Palermo, own goal
2014	Lionel Messi (4), Ángel Di María, Gonzalo Higuaín, Marcos Rojo, own goal
2018	Sergio Agüero (2), Lionel Messi, Marcos Rojo, Ángel Di María, Gabriel Mercado
2022	Lionel Messi (7), Julián Alvarez (4), Enzo Fernández, Alexis Mac Allister, Nahuel Molina, Ángel Di María
2026	Lionel Messi (8), Lautaro Martínez (3), Enzo Fernández (2), Giovani Lo Celso, Lisandro Martínez, Cristian Romero, Alexis Mac Allister, Julián Alvarez, own goal

== Awards ==
=== Team ===
- (gold) Champions (3): 1978, 1986, 2022
- (silver) Runners-up (4): 1930, 1990, 2014, 2026
- Fair Play Trophy: 1978

=== Individual ===
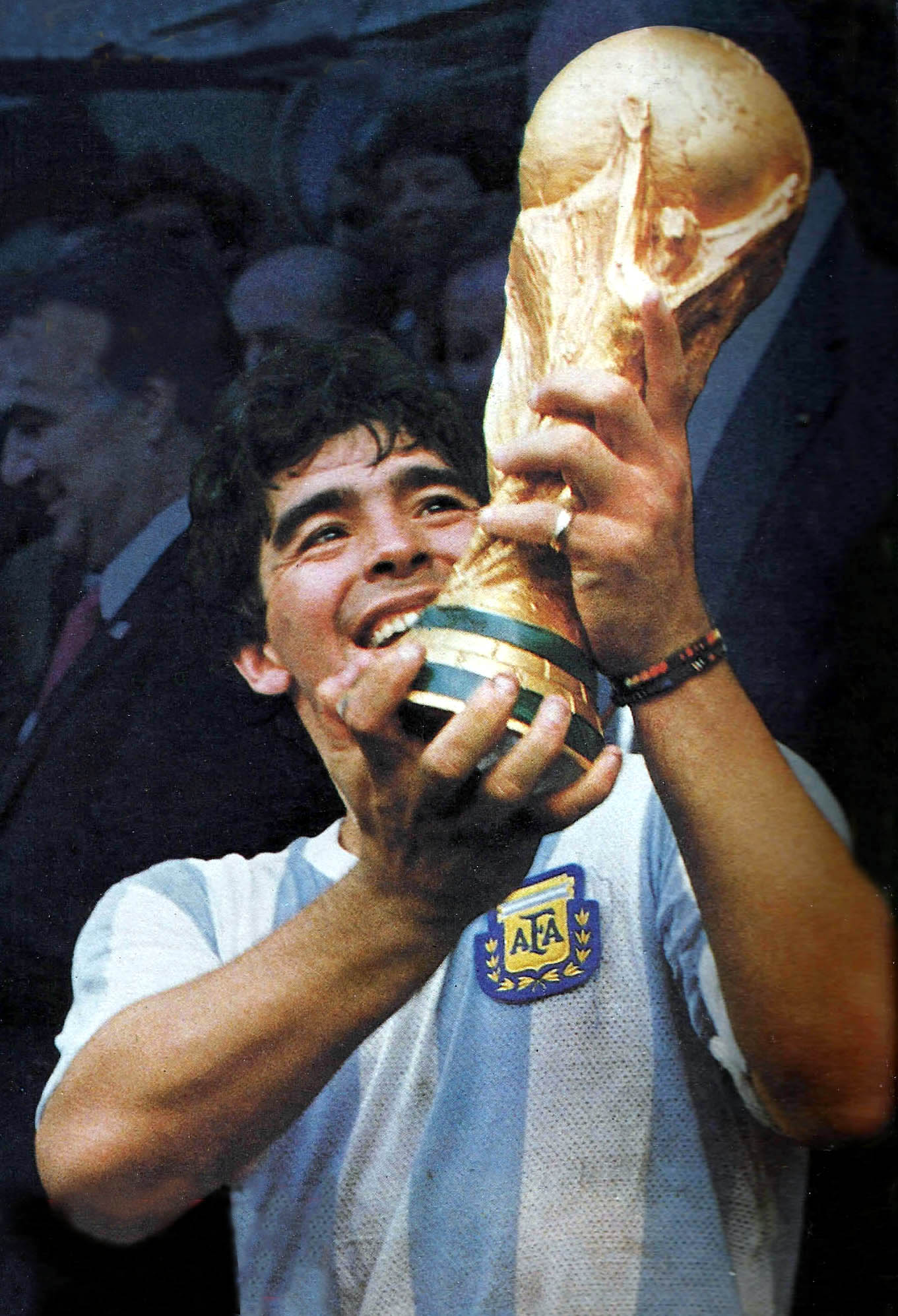
Diego Maradona lifted the World Cup as captain of Argentina in 1986.

- Golden Ball:
  - Mario Kempes (1978; unofficial)
  - Diego Maradona (1986)
  - Lionel Messi (2014, 2022)
- Silver Ball:
  - Guillermo Stábile (1930; retrospective)
  - Lionel Messi (2026)
- Bronze Ball:
  - Diego Maradona (1990)
- Golden Boot:
  - Guillermo Stábile (1930; retrospective)
  - Mario Kempes (1978; retrospective)
- Silver Boot:
  - Diego Maradona (1986)
  - Gabriel Batistuta (1998)
  - Hernán Crespo (2006)
  - Lionel Messi (2022, 2026)
- Golden Glove:
  - Emiliano Martínez (2022)
- Best Young Player
  - Enzo Fernández (2022)
- Player of the Match win leaders:
  - Lionel Messi (4 in 2014, 5 in 2022, 5 in 2026)
- Most Player of the Match wins overall:
  - Lionel Messi (16)

== Miscellaneous ==
Argentina's match against West Germany in 1958 featured a yellow jersey instead of the traditional light blue and white colors or blue as alternate. This was because both teams wore white jerseys, creating confusion. As the South American side forgot to bring a second jersey, they decided to borrow jerseys from local team club Malmö. Germany won 3–1.

In the 1978 France–Hungary match something similar occurred. Both teams arrived to the match with white jerseys, so France was forced to borrow jerseys from Mar del Plata's local club Kimberley. France wore striped green and white keeping the traditional blue shorts and red socks. France won 3–1.

The stadium José María Minella is the southernmost World Cup venue located at 38°0′0″S 57°33′0″W. Including France vs. Hungary, several matches of the 1978 World Cup were played in this stadium. Mar del Plata is in the south of Buenos Aires Province.

== Referees ==
As a major CONMEBOL member, Argentina has been represented by match officials in nearly every tournament. In 2006, Horacio Elizondo refereed the final between France and Italy, where he sent off Zinedine Zidane after a headbutt to an opponent. In 2018, Néstor Pitana did it when France played versus Croatia. They are also the only two who refereed the opening game in the same tournament.

== See also ==
- Disaster of Sweden
- Argentina at the Copa América
- South American nations at the FIFA World Cup
