= 1930 FIFA World Cup knockout stage =

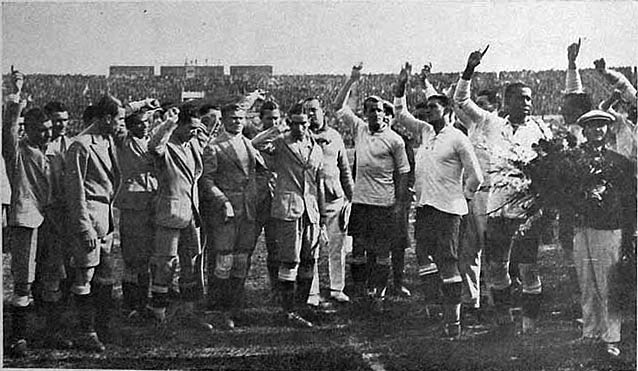
Both teams saluting their fans in the final at Centenario, 30 July 1930.

The knockout stage of the 1930 FIFA World Cup was played between 26 and 30 July 1930. The semi-finals were played on 26 and 27 July, with two rest days before the final on 30 July.

== Format ==
According to the format of the tournament, the 13 participants were divided into four pools. The winner of each group would progress to the semi-finals of the knockout stage. Since there were no predefined brackets, a draw took place in 23 July to decide the semi-final meetings. Hosts Uruguay were drawn to play Yugoslavia. Argentina and the United States would contest the other semi-final.

== Qualified teams ==
The top placed team from each of the four groups qualified for the knockout stage.

Group	Winners
1	Argentina
2	Yugoslavia
3	Uruguay
4	United States

== Bracket ==
Semi-finals
27 July – Montevideo (Centenario)
Uruguay	6
Yugoslavia	1
26 July – Montevideo (Centenario)
Argentina	6
United States	1

Final
30 July – Montevideo (Centenario)
Uruguay	4
Argentina	2

== Semi-finals ==
=== Argentina vs United States ===
The match was even until American center-half Raphael Tracey was injured in the 19th minute. Soon after, Argentina scored the opener with their own center-half, Luis Monti. Tracey left the game at half-time and, since no substitutions were allowed at the time, the United States had to play the second half with 10 men. They also saw goalkeeper Jimmy Douglas hurt his shoulder 15 minutes into the second half. The Argentines scored five more times and went on to win the match, becoming the first team qualified for a World Cup final.

26 July 1930
14:45 UYT

Argentina	6–1	United States
Monti 20'; Scopelli 56'; Stábile 69', 87'; Peucelle 80', 85'		Brown 89'

Estadio Centenario, Montevideo
Attendance: 72,886
Referee: John Langenus (Belgium)

Argentina

United States

GK	Juan Botasso
RB	José Della Torre
LB	Fernando Paternoster
RH	Juan Evaristo
CH	Luis Monti
LH	Rodolfo Orlandini
OR	Carlos Peucelle
IR	Alejandro Scopelli
CF	Guillermo Stábile
IL	Manuel Ferreira (c)
OL	Mario Evaristo
Managers:
Francisco Olazar; Juan José Tramutola

GK	Jimmy Douglas
RB	Alexander Wood
LB	George Moorhouse
RH	Jimmy Gallagher
CH	Raphael Tracey	(substituted off) 45'
LH	Andy Auld
OR	Jim Brown
IR	Billy Gonsalves
CF	Bert Patenaude
IL	Tom Florie (c)
OL	Bart McGhee
Manager:
Bob Millar

=== Uruguay vs Yugoslavia ===
Yugoslavia opened the score in the 4th minute with Đorđe Vujadinović and had a disallowed goal in the 9th. The Uruguayans made a recovery and Pedro Cea equalized. They took the lead still in the first half with two more goals. In the second half, the host nation sealed the result three more times, and Cea completed a hat-trick. The Yugoslavs heavily contested refereeing decisions on the third and fourth Uruguayan goals, but to no avail. Uruguay advanced to the final in home soil.

27 July 1930
14:45 UYT (UTC−03:30)

Uruguay	6–1	(Kingdom of Yugoslavia) Yugoslavia
Cea 18', 67', 72' (Note: This is one of several goals for which the statistical details are disputed. The goalscorers and timings used here are those of FIFA, the official record. Some other sources, such as RSSSF, state a different scorer, timing, or both.); Anselmo 20', 31'; Iriarte 61'		Vujadinović 4'

Estadio Centenario, Montevideo
Attendance: 79,867
Referee: Gilberto de Almeida Rêgo (Brazil)

Uruguay

Yugoslavia

GK	Enrique Ballestrero
RB	José Nasazzi (c)
LB	Ernesto Mascheroni
RH	José Andrade
CH	Lorenzo Fernández
LH	Álvaro Gestido
OR	Pablo Dorado
IR	Héctor Scarone
CF	Peregrino Anselmo
IL	Pedro Cea
OL	Santos Iriarte
Manager:
Alberto Suppici

GK	Milovan Jakšić
RB	Milutin Ivković (c)
LB	Dragoslav Mihajlović
RH	Milorad Arsenijević
CH	Ljubiša Stefanović
LH	Momčilo Đokić
OR	Aleksandar Tirnanić
IR	Blagoje Marjanović
CF	Ivan Bek
IL	Đorđe Vujadinović
OL	Branislav Sekulić
Manager:
Boško Simonović

== Final ==
30 July 1930
12:45 UYT (UTC-03:30)

Uruguay	4–2	Argentina
Dorado 12'; Cea 57'; Iriarte 68'; Castro 89'		Peucelle 20'; Stábile 37'

Estadio Centenario, Montevideo
Attendance: 68,346
Referee: John Langenus (Belgium)

Uruguay	Argentina

GK	Enrique Ballestrero
RB	José Nasazzi (c)
LB	Ernesto Mascheroni
RH	José Andrade
CH	Lorenzo Fernández
LH	Álvaro Gestido
OR	Pablo Dorado
IR	Héctor Scarone
CF	Héctor Castro
IL	Pedro Cea
OL	Santos Iriarte
Manager:
Alberto Suppici

GK	Juan Botasso
RB	José Della Torre
LB	Fernando Paternoster
RH	Juan Evaristo
CH	Luis Monti
LH	Arico Suárez
OR	Carlos Peucelle
IR	Francisco Varallo
CF	Guillermo Stábile
IL	Manuel Ferreira (c)
OL	Mario Evaristo
Managers:
Francisco Olazar; Juan José Tramutola

Assistant referees:
Ulises Saucedo (Bolivia)
Henri Christophe (Belgium)
