= List of FIFA World Cup final goalscorers =

The following is a list of goalscorers in FIFA World Cup finals. Only goals scored during regulation or extra time are included. Any goals scored during the penalty shoot-out are excluded. As of the 2022 final, sixty-two individuals have scored the total of eighty goals in all of the finals history. Twelve players have scored multiple goals in the finals. Only five players in FIFA World Cup history have scored goals in two different World Cup final matches, Vavá (1958, 1962), Pelé (1958, 1970), Paul Breitner (1974, 1982), Zinedine Zidane (1998, 2006), and Kylian Mbappé (2018, 2022). Seven players have done so via a penalty kick. Mario Mandžukić was the first player to score an own goal in a final, as well as the first to follow it up with a goal at the opponent's net. He scored the opening and closing goal of the final in 2018. Geoff Hurst and Kylian Mbappé are the only men's players to score a hat trick in a final. Only two players have scored in two consecutive FIFA World Cup finals: Vavá and Mbappé. Only two scorers, Pelé and Mbappé, have scored in a World Cup final as teenagers. Mbappé is also the only player to score multiple goals in a losing final.

ESPN featured a documentary on the 34 finals goalscorers who were alive before the 2010 final.

== FIFA World Cup Final goalscorers ==
Year	Player	Team	Score	Minute	Result	Report	Shoot-out scorers
1930	Pablo Dorado	Uruguay	1–0	12'	4–2	Report	
1930	Carlos Peucelle	Argentina	1–1	20'	4–2	Report	
1930	Guillermo Stábile	Argentina	2–1	37'	4–2	Report	
1930	Pedro Cea	Uruguay	2–2	57'	4–2	Report	
1930	Santos Iriarte	Uruguay	3–2	68'	4–2	Report	
1930	Héctor Castro	Uruguay	4–2	89'	4–2	Report	
1934	Antonín Puč	Czechoslovakia	1–0	71'	2–1	Report	
1934	Raimundo Orsi	Italy	1–1	81'	2–1	Report	
1934	Angelo Schiavio	Italy	2–1	95'	2–1	Report	
1938	Gino Colaussi	Italy	1–0	6'	4–2	Report	
1938	Pál Titkos	Hungary	1–1	8'	4–2	Report	
1938	Silvio Piola	Italy	2–1	16'	4–2	Report	
1938	Gino Colaussi (2)	Italy	3–1	35'	4–2	Report	
1938	György Sárosi	Hungary	2–3	70'	4–2	Report	
1938	Silvio Piola (2)	Italy	4–2	82'	4–2	Report	
1950 (Note: Not the final but the decisive match of the final group stage.)	Friaça	Brazil	1–0	47'	2–1	Report	
1950	Juan Alberto Schiaffino	Uruguay	1–1	66'	2–1	Report	
1950	Alcides Ghiggia	Uruguay	2–1	79'	2–1	Report	
1954	Ferenc Puskás	Hungary	1–0	6'	3–2	Report	
1954	Zoltán Czibor	Hungary	2–0	8'	3–2	Report	
1954	Max Morlock	West Germany	1–2	10'	3–2	Report	
1954	Helmut Rahn	West Germany	2–2	18'	3–2	Report	
1954	Helmut Rahn (2)	West Germany	3–2	84'	3–2	Report	
1958	Nils Liedholm	Sweden	1–0	4'	5–2	Report	
1958	Vavá	Brazil	1–1	9'	5–2	Report	
1958	Vavá (2)	Brazil	2–1	32'	5–2	Report	
1958	Pelé	Brazil	3–1	55'	5–2	Report	
1958	Zagallo	Brazil	4–1	68'	5–2	Report	
1958	Agne Simonsson	Sweden	2–4	80'	5–2	Report	
1958	Pelé (2)	Brazil	5–2	90'	5–2	Report	
1962	Josef Masopust	Czechoslovakia	1–0	15'	3–1	Report	
1962	Amarildo Tavares da Silveira	Brazil	1–1	17'	3–1	Report	
1962	Zito	Brazil	2–1	69'	3–1	Report	
1962	Vavá (3)	Brazil	3–1	78'	3–1	Report	
1966	Helmut Haller	West Germany	1–0	12'	4–2	Report	
1966	Geoff Hurst	England	1–1	18'	4–2	Report	
1966	Martin Peters	England	2–1	78'	4–2	Report	
1966	Wolfgang Weber	West Germany	2–2	89'	4–2	Report	
1966	Geoff Hurst (2)	England	3–2	101'	4–2	Report	
1966	Geoff Hurst (3)	England	4–2	120'	4–2	Report	
1970	Pelé (3)	Brazil	1–0	18'	4–1	Report	
1970	Roberto Boninsegna	Italy	1–1	37'	4–1	Report	
1970	Gérson	Brazil	2–1	66'	4–1	Report	
1970	Jairzinho	Brazil	3–1	71'	4–1	Report	
1970	Carlos Alberto	Brazil	4–1	86'	4–1	Report	
1974	Johan Neeskens	Netherlands	1–0	2' (p)	2–1	Report	
1974	Paul Breitner	West Germany	1–1	25' (p)	2–1	Report	
1974	Gerd Müller	West Germany	2–1	43'	2–1	Report	
1978	Mario Kempes	Argentina	1–0	38'	3–1	Report	
1978	Dirk Nanninga	Netherlands	1–1	82'	3–1	Report	
1978	Mario Kempes (2)	Argentina	2–1	105'	3–1	Report	
1978	Daniel Bertoni	Argentina	3–1	115'	3–1	Report	
1982	Paolo Rossi	Italy	1–0	57'	3–1	Report	
1982	Marco Tardelli	Italy	2–0	69'	3–1	Report	
1982	Alessandro Altobelli	Italy	3–0	81'	3–1	Report	
1982	Paul Breitner (2)	West Germany	1–3	83'	3–1	Report	
1986	José Luis Brown	Argentina	1–0	23'	3–2	Report	
1986	Jorge Valdano	Argentina	2–0	56'	3–2	Report	
1986	Karl-Heinz Rummenigge	West Germany	1–2	74'	3–2	Report	
1986	Rudi Völler	West Germany	2–2	81'	3–2	Report	
1986	Jorge Burruchaga	Argentina	3–2	84'	3–2	Report	
1990	Andreas Brehme	West Germany	1–0	85' (p)	1–0	Report	
1994	No goals scored. Match decided in penalty shoot-out.					Report	Romário, Demetrio Albertini, Branco, Alberico Evani, Dunga
1998	Zinedine Zidane	France	1–0	27'	3–0	Report	
1998	Zinedine Zidane (2)	France	2–0	45+1'	3–0	Report	
1998	Emmanuel Petit	France	3–0	90+3'	3–0	Report	
2002	Ronaldo	Brazil	1–0	67'	2–0	Report	
2002	Ronaldo (2)	Brazil	2–0	79'	2–0	Report	
2006	Zinedine Zidane (3)	France	1–0	7' (p)	1–1	Report	Andrea Pirlo, Sylvain Wiltord, Marco Materazzi, Daniele de Rossi, Eric Abidal, Alessandro del Piero, Willy Sagnol, Fabio Grosso
2006	Marco Materazzi	Italy	1–1	19'	1–1	Report	Andrea Pirlo, Sylvain Wiltord, Marco Materazzi, Daniele de Rossi, Eric Abidal, Alessandro del Piero, Willy Sagnol, Fabio Grosso
2006	Match decided in penalty shoot-out.					Report	Andrea Pirlo, Sylvain Wiltord, Marco Materazzi, Daniele de Rossi, Eric Abidal, Alessandro del Piero, Willy Sagnol, Fabio Grosso
2010	Andrés Iniesta	Spain	1–0	116'	1–0	Report	
2014	Mario Götze	Germany	1–0	113'	1–0	Report	
2018	Mario Mandžukić	France	1–0	18' (o.g.)	4–2	Report	
2018	Ivan Perišić	Croatia	1–1	28'	4–2	Report	
2018	Antoine Griezmann	France	2–1	38' (p)	4–2	Report	
2018	Paul Pogba	France	3–1	59'	4–2	Report	
2018	Kylian Mbappé	France	4–1	65'	4–2	Report	
2018	Mario Mandžukić	Croatia	2–4	69'	4–2	Report	
2022	Lionel Messi	Argentina	1–0	23' (p)	3–3	Report	Kylian Mbappé, Lionel Messi, Paulo Dybala, Leandro Paredes, Randal Kolo Muani, Gonzalo Montiel
2022	Ángel Di María	Argentina	2–0	36'	3–3	Report	Kylian Mbappé, Lionel Messi, Paulo Dybala, Leandro Paredes, Randal Kolo Muani, Gonzalo Montiel
2022	Kylian Mbappé (2)	France	2–1	80' (p)	3–3	Report	Kylian Mbappé, Lionel Messi, Paulo Dybala, Leandro Paredes, Randal Kolo Muani, Gonzalo Montiel
2022	Kylian Mbappé (3)	France	2–2	81'	3–3	Report	Kylian Mbappé, Lionel Messi, Paulo Dybala, Leandro Paredes, Randal Kolo Muani, Gonzalo Montiel
2022	Lionel Messi (2)	Argentina	3–2	108'	3–3	Report	Kylian Mbappé, Lionel Messi, Paulo Dybala, Leandro Paredes, Randal Kolo Muani, Gonzalo Montiel
2022	Kylian Mbappé (4)	France	3–3	118' (p)	3–3	Report	Kylian Mbappé, Lionel Messi, Paulo Dybala, Leandro Paredes, Randal Kolo Muani, Gonzalo Montiel
2022	Match decided in penalty shoot-out.					Report	Kylian Mbappé, Lionel Messi, Paulo Dybala, Leandro Paredes, Randal Kolo Muani, Gonzalo Montiel
2026	Ferran Torres	Spain	1–0	106'	1–0	Report	

== Players with most goals in Finals ==
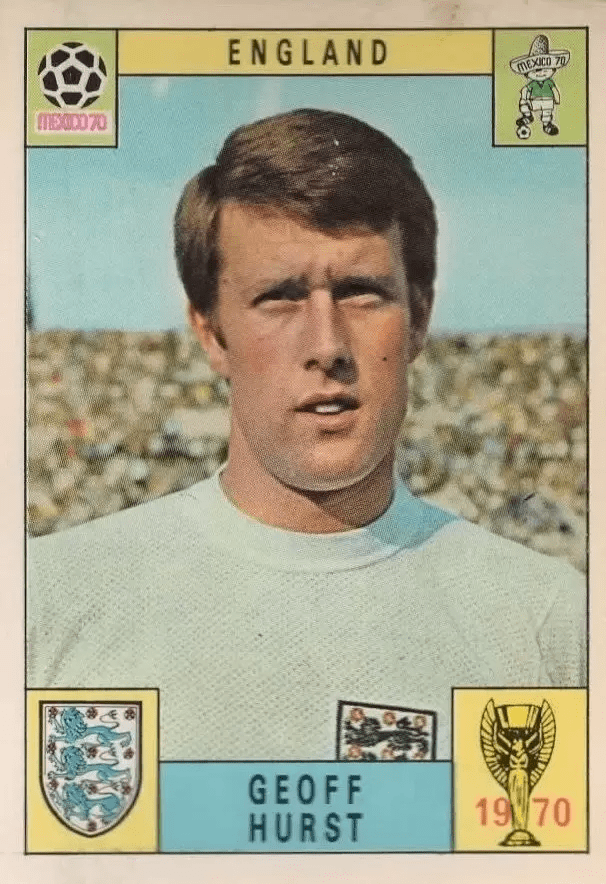

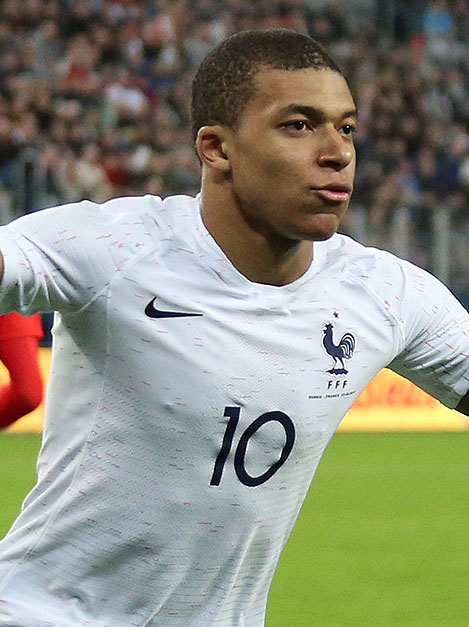
Geoff Hurst (above) and Kylian Mbappé (below) are the only two male players to have scored a hat-trick in a FIFA World Cup final.

Players with multiple goals in FIFA World Cup Finals
Player	Team	Goals scored	Finals played	Final(s)
Kylian Mbappé	France	4	2	**2018**, 2022^{3}
Geoff Hurst	England	3	1	**1966^{3}**
Vavá	Brazil	3	2	**1958^{2}**, **1962**
Pelé	Brazil	3	2	**1958^{2}**, **1970**
Zinedine Zidane	France	3	2	**1998^{2}**, 2006
Gino Colaussi	Italy	2	1	**1938^{2}**
Silvio Piola	Italy	2	1	**1938^{2}**
Helmut Rahn	West Germany	2	1	**1954^{2}**
Mario Kempes	Argentina	2	1	**1978^{2}**
Paul Breitner	West Germany	2	2	**1974**, 1982
Ronaldo	Brazil	2	2	(1998), **2002^{2}**
Lionel Messi	Argentina	2	3	(2014), **2022^{2}**, (2026)

- **Bold** indicates winning final
- Parentheses indicates no goals scored
- ^{2} indicates brace scored
- ^{3} indicates hat-trick scored
