= 1930 FIFA World Cup final =

Inaugural World Cup final, held in Uruguay

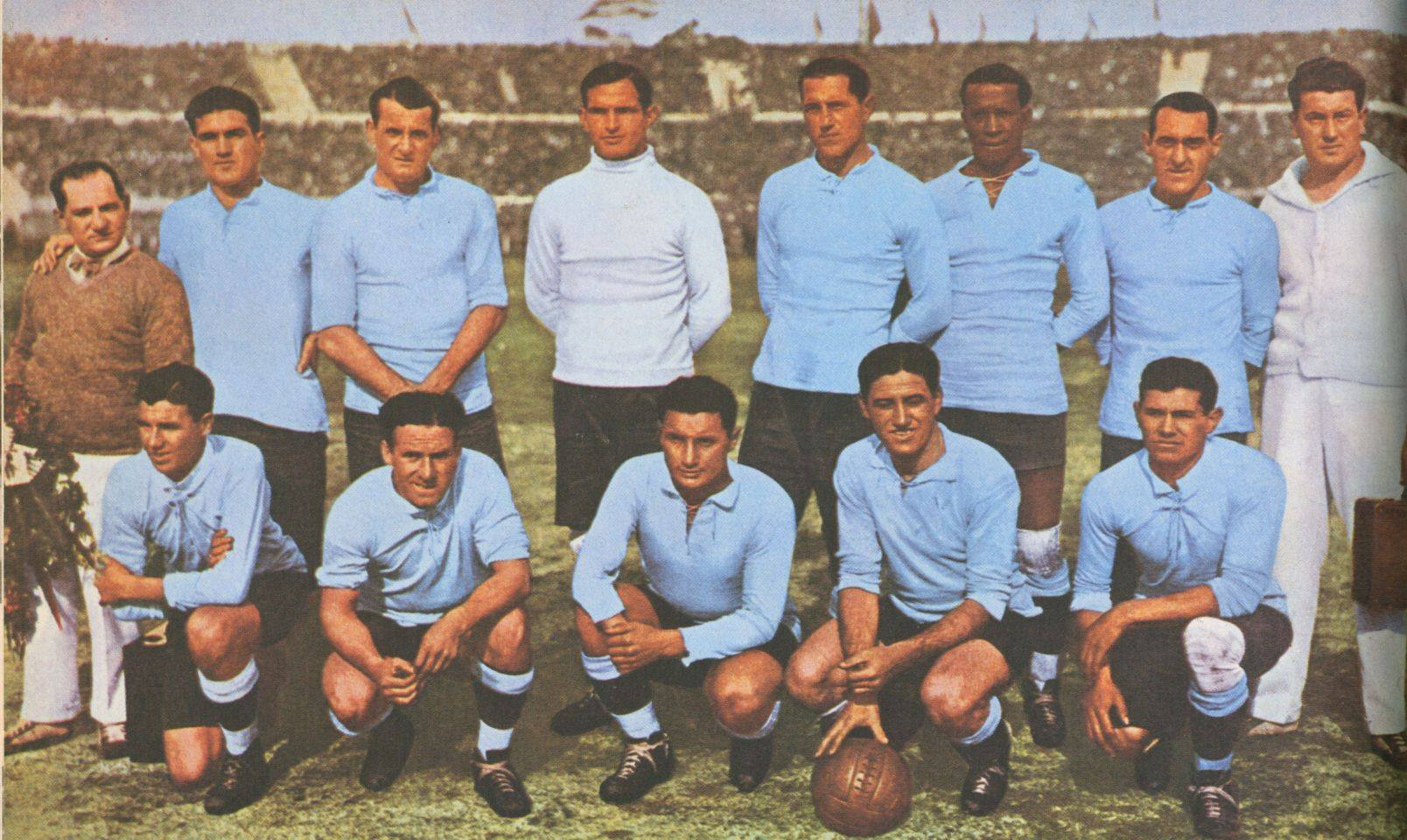
- Eventual champions Uruguay before the match
- Event: 1930 FIFA World Cup
Uruguay	Argentina
4	2
- Date: 30 July 1930
- Venue: Estadio Centenario, Montevideo
- Referee: John Langenus (Belgium)
- Attendance: 68,346

The final match of the 1930 FIFA World Cup, the inaugural edition of FIFA's competition for national football teams, was played at the Estadio Centenario in Montevideo, Uruguay, on 30 July 1930, and was contested by Uruguay and Argentina. The tournament comprised hosts Uruguay and 12 other teams that were invited by FIFA to compete. The 13 teams competed in a group stage, from which 4 teams qualified for the knockout stage. En route to the final, Uruguay finished first in Group 3, with two wins, after which they defeated Yugoslavia in the semi-final. Argentina finished first in Group 1 with three wins, before defeating the United States in the semi-final. The final took place in front of 93,000 supporters with the stadium gates opening at eight in the morning six hours before kick-off, and at noon the ground was full, and was refereed by John Langenus from Belgium.

Before the match, a disagreement overshadowed the build-up to the match as which team would provide the match ball. FIFA intervened with a compromise, that Argentina would provide the ball for the first half, and Uruguay for the second. Uruguay opened the scoring in the 12th minute with Pablo Dorado opening the scoring. Carlos Peucelle equalised in the 20th minute, beating goalkeeper Enrique Ballestrero with a powerful shot. The tournament top scorer Guillermo Stábile gave Argentina a 2–1 lead going into the break. In the 57th minute, Uruguay leveled the score via a goal from Pedro Cea. Two more goals in the 68th and the 89th minute from Santos Iriarte and Héctor Castro put Uruguay up 4–2, sealing victory in the inaugural World Cup.

Uruguay manager Alberto Suppici was 31 at the time, and still holds the record for being youngest coach of a FIFA World Cup winning team. Jules Rimet, president of FIFA, presented Uruguay with the World Cup Trophy, later to be named after him. The following day was declared a national holiday in Uruguay. In Buenos Aires, a mob threw stones at the Uruguayan consulate.

The last living player from the final was Argentine striker Francisco Varallo, who died on 30 August 2010 aged 100. The last living Uruguayan from the final was Ernesto Mascheroni, who died on 3 July 1984 aged 76. This was the first World Cup final to feature two Spanish-speaking countries, with the only other being the 2026 final between Argentina and Spain.

== Background ==
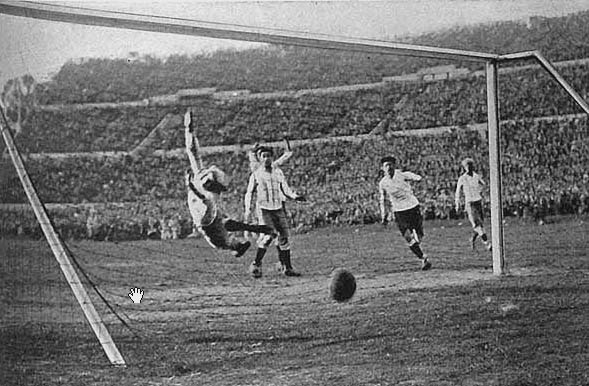
The 4th goal of Uruguay v. Argentina national team scored by Héctor Castro.

Heading into the 1930 World Cup, Uruguay was experiencing its "golden generation" at the time. At continental level, Uruguay had won half of the South America Championship (forerunner to the Copa America), with the national team also winning the gold medal at the 1924 Summer Olympics in Paris and 1928 Summer Olympics in Amsterdam. For Argentina, they won the last two South American Championships in 1927 and 1929 and had also finished with a silver medal at the 1928 Olympics.

Before the World Cup final, the two teams had played in one hundred and ten matches. This included eleven matches at the continental level, and two matches at the 1928 Olympic final, in which Uruguay won 2–1 in a replay. The last match before the World Cup between the two teams was at the 1930 Copa Newton which was only held two months prior on the 25 May in Buenos Aires which saw the match end in a 1–1 draw between the two teams but as Uruguay was the visiting country, they won the trophy.

== Route to the final ==
=== Uruguay ===
Uruguay was drawn in Group 3 with Peru and Romania. The opening match was against Peru at the Estadio Centenario was delayed by five days with the game being proceeded by a ceremony before the match. The first half saw the hosts intimidated by the 90,000 crowd as they would scrape for a one-nil victory with Héctor Castro scoring in the 65th minute to give Uruguay the win. At the end of the match, the Uruguayan press wanted a more demanding a more comprehensively attack in the next game against Romania.

Uruguay
Round
Argentina
Opponent
Result
First round
Opponent
Result
Peru
1–0
Match 1
France
1–0
Romania
4–0
Match 2
Mexico
6–3

Match 3
Chile
3–1

Team	Pld	W	D	L	GF	GA	GD	Pts
Uruguay	2	2	0	0	5	0	+5	4
Romania	2	1	0	1	3	5	−2	2
Peru	2	0	0	2	1	4	−3	0

Final standing

Team	Pld	W	D	L	GF	GA	GD	Pts
Argentina	3	3	0	0	10	4	+6	6
Chile	3	2	0	1	5	3	+2	4
France	3	1	0	2	4	3	+1	2
Mexico	3	0	0	3	4	13	−9	0

Opponent
Result
Knockout stage
Opponent
Result
Yugoslavia
6–1
Semi-finals
United States
6–1

== Match ==
=== Summary ===
After 12 minutes, Pablo Dorado put the hosts into the lead, before Argentina winger Carlos Peucelle equalised 8 minutes later, beating goalkeeper Enrique Ballestrero with a powerful shot. In the 37th minute, tournament top scorer Guillermo Stábile gave Argentina a 2–1 lead going into the break. Uruguay leveled the score 12 minutes into the second half via a goal from Pedro Cea, and took the lead back for good with a Santos Iriarte goal in the 68th minute. With a minute remaining, Héctor Castro put Uruguay up 4–2, sealing victory in the inaugural World Cup.

=== Details ===
30 July 1930
12:45 UYT (UTC-03:30)

Uruguay	4–2	Argentina
Dorado 12'; Cea 57'; Iriarte 68'; Castro 89'		Peucelle 20'; Stábile 37'

Estadio Centenario, Montevideo
Attendance: 68,346
Referee: John Langenus (Belgium)

Uruguay	Argentina

GK	Enrique Ballestrero
RB	José Nasazzi (c)
LB	Ernesto Mascheroni
RH	José Andrade
CH	Lorenzo Fernández
LH	Álvaro Gestido
OR	Pablo Dorado
IR	Héctor Scarone
CF	Héctor Castro
IL	Pedro Cea
OL	Santos Iriarte
Manager:
Alberto Suppici

GK	Juan Botasso
RB	José Della Torre
LB	Fernando Paternoster
RH	Juan Evaristo
CH	Luis Monti
LH	Arico Suárez
OR	Carlos Peucelle
IR	Francisco Varallo
CF	Guillermo Stábile
IL	Manuel Ferreira (c)
OL	Mario Evaristo
Managers:
Francisco Olazar; Juan José Tramutola

Assistant referees:
Ulises Saucedo (Bolivia)
Henri Christophe (Belgium)

Match rules

- 90 minutes
- 30 minutes of extra time if necessary
- Replay if scores still level
- No substitutions permitted

== See also ==
- Argentina at the FIFA World Cup
- Uruguay at the FIFA World Cup
- Argentina–Uruguay football rivalry
