= 1928 Copa Aldao =

- Peñarol, winners
- Event: Copa Aldao
Huracán	Peñarol
(Argentina)	(Uruguay)
0	3
- Date: October 26, 1929
- Venue: River Plate, Buenos Aires

The 1928 Copa Aldao was the final match to decide the winner of the Copa Aldao, the eighth edition of the international competition organised by the Argentine and Uruguayan Associations together. The final was contested by Uruguayan club Peñarol and Argentine side Huracán.

The match was played at River Plate Stadium in Buenos Aires, where Peñarol beat Huracán 3–0, winning its first (and only) Copa Aldao trophy in the history of the club.

== Qualified teams ==
Team	Qualification	Previous final app.
(Argentina) Huracán	1928 Argentine Primera División champion	(none)
(Uruguay) Peñarol	1928 Uruguayan Primera División champion	1918

- **Bold** indicates winning years

== Venue ==
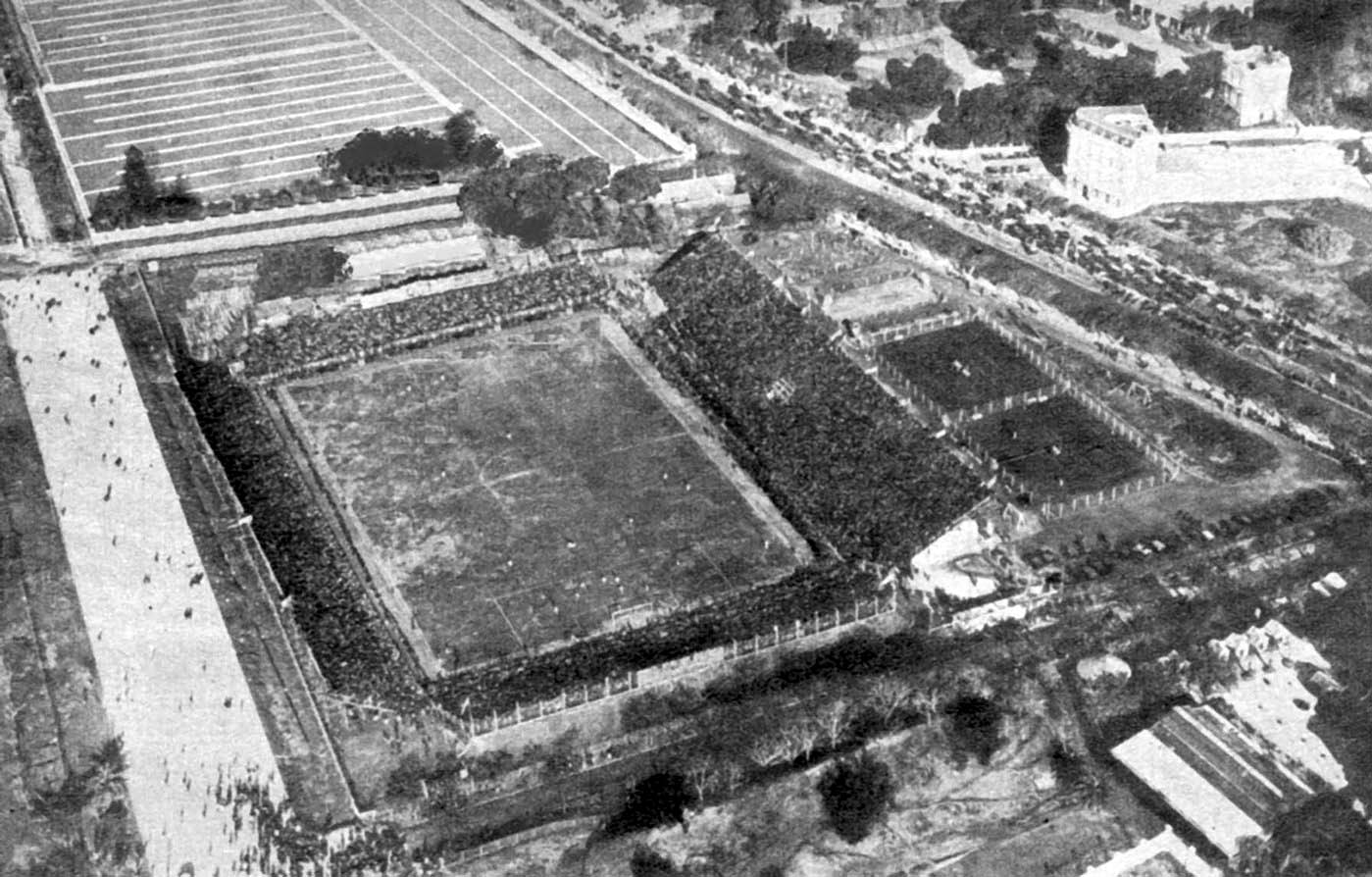
Estadio River Plate, venue of the final

== Match ==
=== Summary ===
Uruguayan Denis D'Agosto is checked by doctors after being fouled. The match was as intense as rough in some moments

Argentine sports magazine El Gráfico referred to the match as "the most mediocre Rioplatense final in the history of the competition", considering that both, Argentine and Uruguayan football, were considered (in words of the journalist) the best in the world. The chronicle noted that most time of the match teams were more enthusiasts in struggling rather than showing their potential as reigning champions of their respective leagues.

Huracán was described as more fast and impetuous, opposite to the superior class of Peñarol players. The Argentine side had a dominance of the match in the first minutes, nevertheless their lack of effectivity to capitalise the goal attempts and the good performance of Peñarol defenders, who made their job fiercely, with some rough play towards their rivals.

Thus the nervous overcame the local team, which focused on fire back Peñarol's rough play, causing a total disorder on their actions while Peñarol reacted, although the game continued being mediocre from both parts, any of them showed a good technique.

Near the end of the first half, two mistakes of the local defenders caused Peñarol took a 1–0 lead after Lorenzo Fernández scored the first goal.

Huracán's Adán Loizo being anticipated by Álvaro Gestido

In the second half, Huracán was in search of a necessary goal that could put them in conditions to equalise the game, while Peñarol defended their advantage without taking unnecessary risks. Tendence to rough game and agressivity between both teams continued, more typical from an old rivalry rather than teams that met for the first time. All of those factors contributed to increase the poor quality of the game even more. The desperate attempts of Huracán to score left their opponents lots of space to strike back.

Team of Huracán, losing side

El Gráfico also highlighted the poor performance of Huracán's Juan Pratto, leaving his position to take offensive duties and therefore facilitating the duty of Peñarol forwards who took advantage of the situation. The journalist also noted the few participation of the wingers, who were well marked by their opponents, causing Huracán made their plays towards the centre of the attack, with their attempts being neutralised by Peñarol backs.

As a result of all those imbalances the third goal came when Arremond crossed the ball and Sarni anticipated Negro to seal the deffinitive 3-0.

Regarding the individual performances of Huracán players, El Gráfico noted that goalkeeper Rafael Negro felt insecure, blaming him for most of the goals conceded. The magazine also focused on the absense of back Carlos Nobile, stating that "without him, the defense worth less than a half", also critisizing the poor performance of Juan Pratto (the orther centre back) and Horacio Souza, who played in a position he was not used to, with unsuccessful results. According to the magazine, Máximo Federici was the best among the midfielders, praising their enthusiasm but on the other hand, critising their rough play. In the line of forwards, Guillermo Stábile was chosen as the most dangerous of them, although his obstination to score and make individual plays contributed to overshadow his performance. Similar reasons were attributed to winger Adán Loizo while Ángel Chiesa and Manuel Spósito were pointed out as "ineffective".

=== Details ===
1928 Copa Aldao
26 October 1929

Huracán (Argentina)	0–3	(Uruguay) Peñarol
	Report	Fernández 38'; Sarni 47', 85'

Estadio de River Plate, Buenos Aires
Referee: Ricardo Riestra (Argentina)

**Huracán**	**Peñarol**

GK	(Argentina) Rafael Negro
DF	(Argentina) Juan Pratto
DF	(Argentina) Hugo Settis
MF	(Argentina) Pablo Bartolucci
MF	(Argentina) Máximo Federici
MF	(Argentina) Horacio Souza
FW	(Argentina) Adán Loizo
FW	(Argentina) Manuel Spósito
FW	(Argentina) Guillermo Stábile
FW	(Argentina) Ángel Chiesa
FW	(Argentina) C. Concheiro

GK	(Uruguay) Miguel Capuccini
DF	(Uruguay) Álvaro Gestido
DF	(Uruguay) Alberto Nogués
MF	(Uruguay) Antonio Campolo
MF	(Uruguay) Gildeón Silva
MF	(Uruguay) Denis D'Agosto
FW	(Uruguay) Antonio Sacco
FW	(Uruguay) Vicente Sarni
FW	(Uruguay) Lorenzo Fernández
FW	(Uruguay) Carlos Riolfo
FW	(Uruguay) Juan Pedro Arremón
