= 1928 Argentine Primera División =

37th season of top-tier football league in Argentina

Primera División
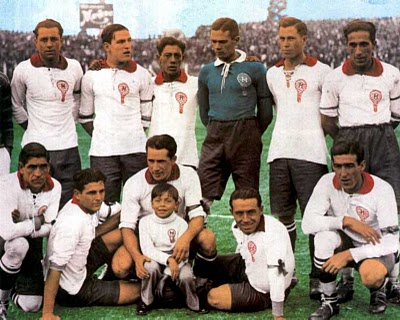
- Huracán, champions
- Season: 1928
- Dates: 15 April 1928 – 30 June 1929
- Champions: Huracán (4th title)
- Promoted: El Porvenir; Argentino (B)
- Relegated: Liberal Argentino; Porteño
- 1928 Copa Aldao: Huracán
- Top goalscorer: (Argentina) Roberto Cherro (32)

The 1928 Argentine Primera División was the 37th season of top-flight football in Argentina. The season began on April 15, 1928, and ended on June 30, 1929. The league expanded to include 36 teams, which played in a single league with each team playing the other only once.

Huracán won its 4th. title in Primera. El Porvenir and Argentino (B) returned to the top division after their runs on Segunda División while Liberal Argentino and Porteño were relegated.

== Final table ==
Pos	Team	Pld	W	D	L	GF	GA	GD	Pts
1	Huracán (C)	35	28	2	5	73	29	+44	58
2	Boca Juniors	35	28	1	6	100	17	+83	57
3	Estudiantes (LP)	35	25	3	7	89	39	+50	53
4	Independiente	35	22	8	5	71	27	+44	52
5	Racing	35	23	3	9	77	38	+39	49
6	San Lorenzo	35	21	5	9	63	38	+25	47
7	River Plate	35	20	6	9	68	42	+26	46
8	Quilmes	35	18	7	10	72	45	+27	43
9	Tigre	35	18	7	10	55	48	+7	43
10	Ferro Carril Oeste	35	19	3	13	78	51	+27	41
11	Banfield	35	15	10	10	63	49	+14	40
12	Chacarita Juniors	35	16	7	12	63	46	+17	39
13	Lanús	35	15	7	13	64	46	+18	37
14	Argentinos Juniors	35	13	10	12	45	40	+5	36
15	Estudiantil Porteño	35	11	12	12	56	52	+4	34
16	Almagro	35	12	10	13	44	53	−9	34
17	San Fernando	35	12	9	14	55	56	−1	33
18	Talleres (RE)	35	13	7	15	40	44	−4	33
19	Sportivo Palermo	35	11	11	13	45	52	−7	33
20	Sportivo Barracas	35	12	8	15	42	47	−5	32
21	Gimnasia y Esgrima (LP)	35	12	8	15	38	44	−6	32
22	Excursionistas	35	11	10	14	35	46	−11	32
23	El Porvenir	35	11	9	15	55	66	−11	31
24	Sportivo Buenos Aires	35	11	9	15	38	51	−13	31
25	Platense	35	10	9	16	40	50	−10	29
26	Argentino (B)	35	9	10	16	46	59	−13	28
27	Atlanta	35	11	5	19	36	60	−24	27
28	Estudiantes (BA)	35	11	5	19	37	62	−25	27
29	Barracas Central	35	9	9	17	42	74	−32	27
30	Argentino (Q)	35	10	6	19	58	68	−10	26
31	San Isidro	35	9	8	18	49	68	−19	26
32	Vélez Sarsfield	35	9	8	18	39	75	−36	26
33	Argentino del Sud (Note: The clubs founders of the Asociación Amateur would only relegate when they occupied for second time one of the last four positions.)	35	9	7	19	34	59	−25	25
34	Liberal Argentino (R)	35	7	7	21	29	71	−42	21
35	Defensores de Belgrano	35	4	11	20	29	79	−50	19
36	Porteño (R)	35	3	5	27	31	108	−77	11

(C) Champions; (R) Relegated
