= Guillermo Stábile =

Argentine footballer (1905–1966)

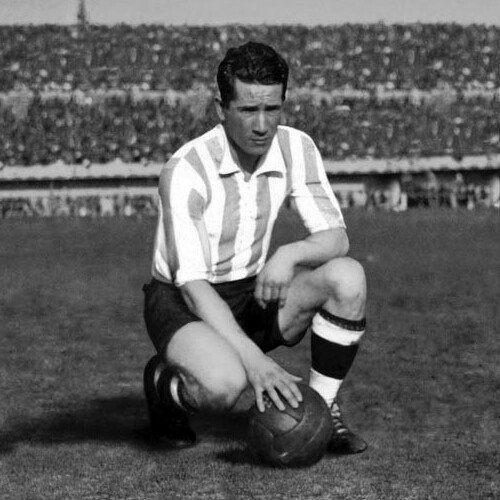
- Stábile while playing for Argentina in 1930 FIFA World Cup

Personal information
- Date of birth: 17 January 1905
- Place of birth: Buenos Aires, Argentina
- Date of death: 26 December 1966 (aged 61)
- Place of death: Buenos Aires, Argentina
- Height: 1.67 m (5 ft 6 in)
- Position: Centre forward

Youth career
- 1915–1920: Sportivo Metán
- 1920–1924: Huracán

Senior career*
Years	Team	Apps	(Gls)
1924–1930	Huracán	121	(102)
1930–1935	Genoa	41	(15)
1935–1936	Napoli	20	(2)
1936–1939	Red Star Paris	19	(2)
Total		201	(121)

International career
1930	Argentina	4	(8)

Managerial career
- 1931–1932: Genoa (co-manager)
- 1937–1939: Red Star Paris
- 1939–1940: San Lorenzo
- 1939–1958: Argentina
- 1940–1941: Estudiantes LP
- 1941–1949: Huracán
- 1949–1960: Racing Club
- 1960–1966: Argentina
Medal record
Men's football
Representing Argentina (as manager)
Copa América
Winner	1941 Chile
Winner	1945 Chile
Winner	1946 Argentina
Winner	1947 Ecuador
Winner	1955 Chile
Winner	1957 Peru
Runner-up	1942 Uruguay
Third place	1956 Uruguay
Representing Argentina (as player)
FIFA World Cup
Runner-up	1930 Uruguay
- * Club domestic league appearances and goals

Guillermo Stábile (17 January 1905 – 26 December 1966) was an Argentine professional football player and manager who played as a centre forward. At club level, Stábile won two national championships with Huracán and played in Italy and France. He was the top scorer of the 1930 FIFA World Cup, the inaugural iteration of the tournament. As manager, he led Argentina to victory at six South American Championships and Racing Club to three league titles.

== Club career ==
=== Early career ===
Stábile was born in Parque Patricios, Buenos Aires. He began his career with local club Sportivo Metán and from 1920, with Huracán. In 1924, he progressed to the first team which played in Argentina's top league, which then still had amateur status. He started out on the right wing but soon evolved into a centre forward. Stábile won many competitions with Huracán, most notably the championships of 1925 and 1928 and the regional trophy Copa Dr. Carlos Ibarguren in 1925.

=== Genoa ===
After capturing the world's attention with his impressive feats in the First World Cup, he was signed by Genoa. He instantly became a fan favourite, scoring a hat-trick on his debut against rivals Bologna. He stayed with the Genoan club for five years, playing 41 games and scoring 16 goals.

=== Napoli ===
During the 1935–36 season, he moved to Napoli with Antonio Vojak transferring the other way to Genoa. This was during the era when Attila Sallustro another South American legend played for Napoli. The club finished 8th in the league with Stábile that played in twenty games.

=== Red Star Paris ===
As a last act of his playing career, Stábile moved to Red Star Paris in Paris, the club founded by Jules Rimet, who took the initiative to the FIFA World Cup, first played in 1930. He stayed with the club until 1939 with the last honour of his playing career being helping the club achieve promotion, from Division 2 back into Division 1. He also served as player-manager for the club.

== International career ==
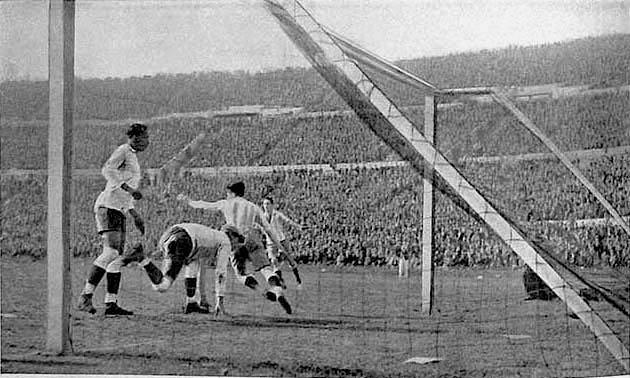
Stábile celebrating Argentina's second goal against Uruguay at the 1930 final

Stábile made his debut for the Argentina national team at the age of 25, in his team's second match in the first ever FIFA World Cup held in 1930 in Uruguay. He did not play in Argentina's first match of the competition against France.

His debut came in the following game against Mexico on July 19, 1930, because the first-choice striker Roberto Cherro couldn't play due to an anxiety attack. The game finished 6–3 to Argentina, with Stábile scoring a hat-trick on his debut. Erroneously, this was long thought to be the first World Cup hat-trick, until 76 years later on 10 November 2006 world football's governing body FIFA confirmed that Bert Patenaude had scored the first World Cup hat-trick in the United States' 3–0 win over Paraguay on July 17, 1930, two days prior to Stábile.

The final game of the group stages saw Argentina facing South American rivals Chile. They won the game 3–1 with Stábile scoring twice, meaning that Argentina had qualified for the semi-finals, against the United States. The South Americans breezed through, with a 6–1 victory; Stábile added two more goals to his account and securing Argentina a place in the finals.

On 30 July 1930, the first ever World Cup final took place, between Argentina and Uruguay. At half time Argentina led 2–1, Stábile having scored the second goal. However, they went on to lose 4–2.

Despite losing the final, Stábile made history, becoming the top scorer in the first ever FIFA World Cup, with his tally of 8 goals in 4 games. It turned out that he would never play for Argentina again, and thus he scored in every game he played for his country, with an average of two goals per match.

=== International goals ===
Scores and results list Argentina's goal tally first, score column indicates score after each Stábile goal.

List of international goals scored by Guillermo Stábile
No.	Date	Venue	Opponent	Score	Result	Competition	Round	Report
1	19 July 1930	Estadio Parque Central, Montevideo, Uruguay	Mexico	1–0	6–3	1930 FIFA World Cup	Group 1	
2	19 July 1930	Estadio Parque Central, Montevideo, Uruguay	Mexico	3–1	6–3	1930 FIFA World Cup	Group 1	
3	19 July 1930	Estadio Parque Central, Montevideo, Uruguay	Mexico	6–3	6–3	1930 FIFA World Cup	Group 1	
4	22 July 1930	Estadio Centenario, Montevideo, Uruguay	Chile	1–0	3–1	1930 FIFA World Cup	Group 1	
5	22 July 1930	Estadio Centenario, Montevideo, Uruguay	Chile	2–1	3–1	1930 FIFA World Cup	Group 1	
6	26 July 1930	Estadio Centenario, Montevideo, Uruguay	United States	3–0	6–1	1930 FIFA World Cup	Semi-final	
7	26 July 1930	Estadio Centenario, Montevideo, Uruguay	United States	6–0	6–1	1930 FIFA World Cup	Semi-final	
8	30 July 1930	Estadio Centenario, Montevideo, Uruguay	Uruguay	2–1	2–4	1930 FIFA World Cup	Final	

== Managerial career ==
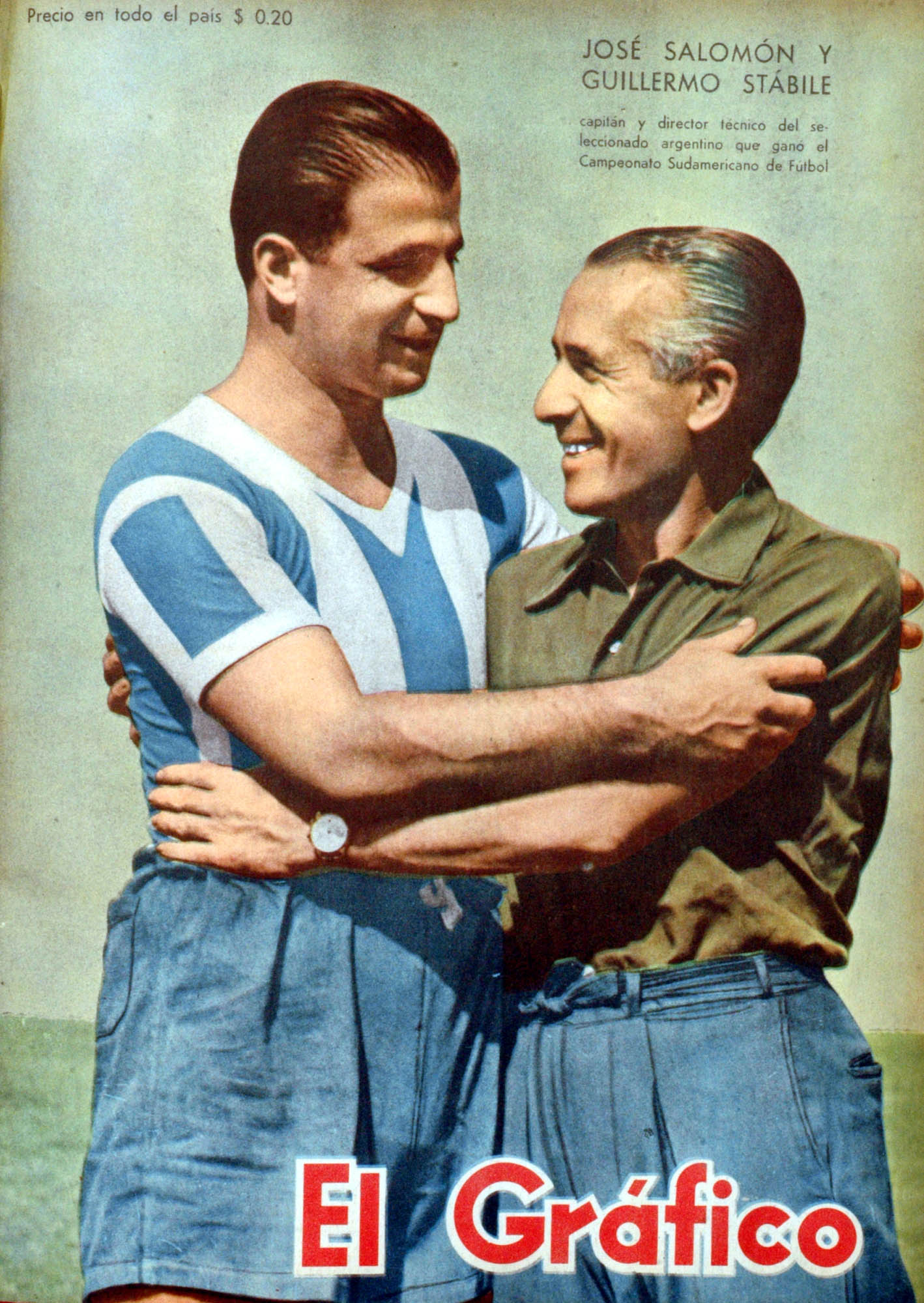
Stábile (right) as coach of the Argentina national team with player José Salomón in 1946

Stábile had received his first taste of managing, way back in the 1931–32 season at Genoa, long before he retired from playing. Here he spent the aforementioned season as a co-manager, alongside Luigi Burlando.

After a year at Red Star Paris, he became player-manager for the club; this included the season in which they were promoted from Ligue 2. Stábile left the French club, to coach the Argentina national team. He began his spell in 1939.

Stábile coached Argentina to six South American Championship trophies: in 1941, 1945, 1946, 1947, 1955 and 1957. After the first round exit at the 1958 World Cup (the first worldwide competition Argentina took part in in 24 years), where Argentina lost the last of its three matches with 1–6 to Czechoslovakia, his time with the national side came to a halt. He was called back to the helm of Argentina in 1960 and he led Argentina in the third and last edition of the Panamerican Football Championship, which took place in Costa Rica.

With the Argentina national side, as a coach (just as he had as a player) Stábile, set records; he coached the national team in 123 official matches gaining 83 victories, making him one of the few coaches with more than 100 international matches in charge.

While managing the national side, he also had spells coaching three other clubs, first the club where he began his career, Huracán and then later Ferro and Racing Club. He led Racing to three consecutive championships between 1949 and 1951.

Stábile retired from management in 1960 to take up the role of director of the Argentina national school of football managing, a post he held, until his death in 1966.

== Honours ==
=== Player ===
Huracán

- Primera División: 1925, 1928
- Copa Ibarguren: 1925
- Copa Aldao runner-up: 1928

Genoa CFC

- Serie B: 1934-35

Argentina

- FIFA World Cup Runner-up: 1930

Individual

- FIFA World Cup Golden Boot: 1930
- FIFA World Cup All-Star Team: 1930

=== Manager ===
Red Star F.C.

- Ligue 2: 1938–39

Huracán

- Copa Adrián C. Escobar: 1942
- Copa de Competencia: 1944

Racing Club

- Copa Adrián C. Escobar: 1945
- Primera División: 1949, 1950, 1951

Argentina

- South American Championship (6): 1941, 1945, 1946, 1947, 1955, 1957
- Pan American Games: 1951, 1955
- Panamerican Championship: 1960

== See also ==
- National team managers with 100 or more matches
- List of FIFA World Cup top goalscorers

Records
Preceded by None	FIFA World Cup Highest Goalscorer; 30 July 1930 – 30 June 1954	Succeeded by Sándor Kocsis; 11
