= Pablo Dorado =

Uruguayan footballer (1908-1978)

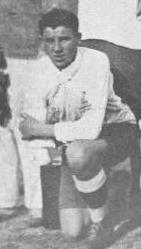
- Dorado with Uruguay in 1930

Personal information
- Full name: Pablo Aniceto Dorado Gallinares
- Date of birth: 22 June 1908
- Place of birth: Montevideo, Uruguay
- Date of death: 18 November 1978 (aged 70)
- Position: Forward

Senior career*
Years	Team	Apps	(Gls)
1929–1941	C.A. Bella Vista	362	(53)
1941–1945	River Plate	200	(11)
Total		562	(64)

International career
1929–1942	Uruguay	17	(3)
Medal record
Men's football
Representing Uruguay
FIFA World Cup
Winner	1930 Uruguay
- * Club domestic league appearances and goals

Pablo Aniceto Dorado Gallinares (22 June 1908 in Montevideo – 18 November 1978) was a footballer who played for the Uruguay national team. He represented his country at the 1930 FIFA World Cup and is better known for being the first ever player to score in a World Cup final. In the final against Argentina, he scored the first goal of the match in the 12th minute, putting the hosts Uruguay in front by shooting the ball through the legs of Argentine goalkeeper Juan Botasso.

Dorado played club football for C.A. Bella Vista in Uruguay and River Plate in Argentina (1931–1935).

== International goals ==
Uruguay's goal tally first

#	Date	Venue	Opponent	Score	Result	Competition
1.	21 July 1930	Estadio Centenario, Montevideo, Uruguay	Romania	1–0	4–0	1930 FIFA World Cup
2.	30 July 1930	Estadio Centenario, Montevideo, Uruguay	Argentina	1–0	4–2	1930 FIFA World Cup Final
3.	18 May 1932	Estadio Centenario, Montevideo, Uruguay	Argentina	1–0	1–0	Friendly
