= John Langenus =

Belgian football referee (1891–1952)

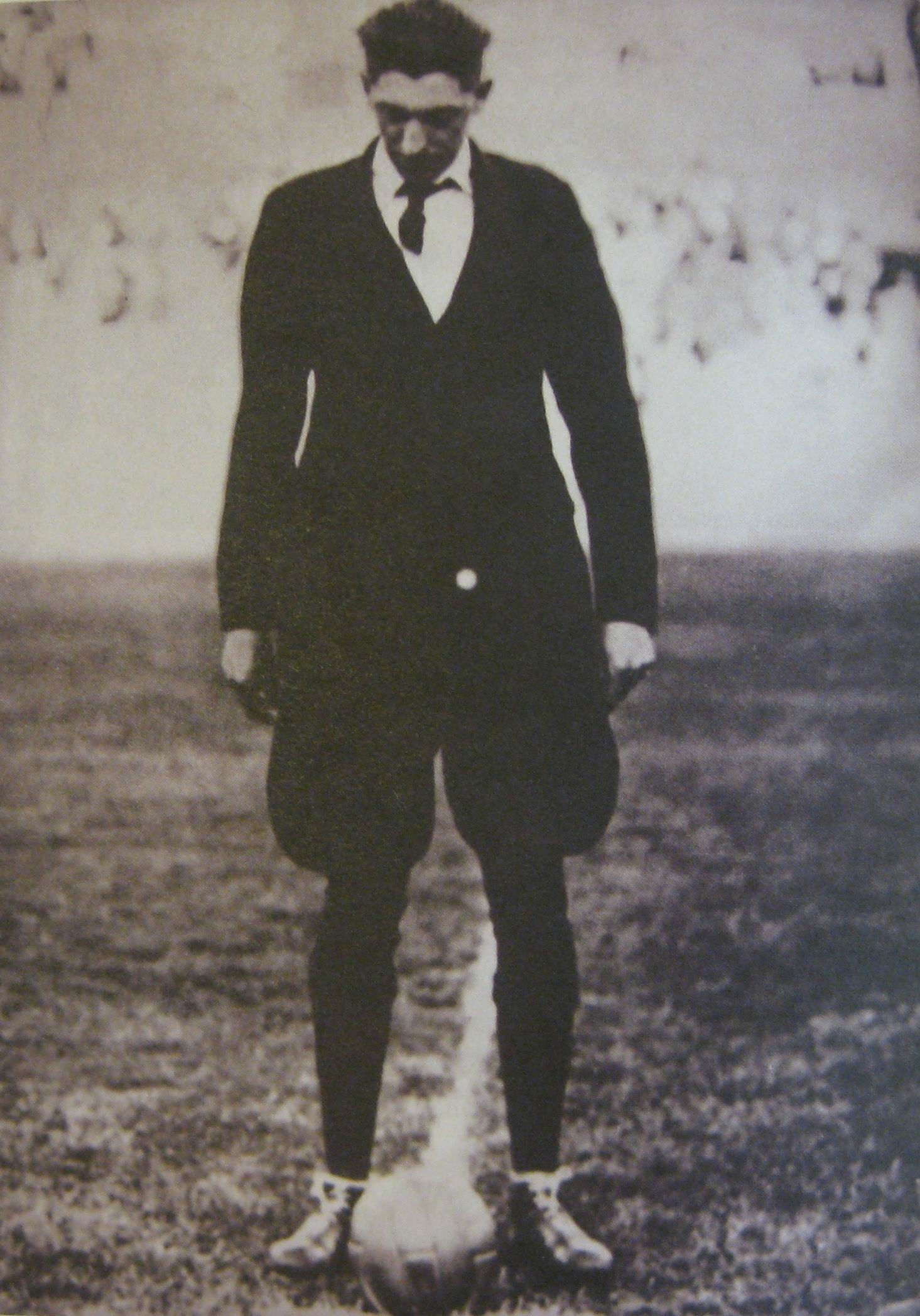
- Born: Joannes Julianus Langenus; 9 December 1891; Antwerp, Belgium
- Died: 1 October 1952 (aged 60); Antwerp, Belgium
- Other names: Jean Langenus; Johannes Langenus; Julian Langenus
- Occupation: Association football referee
- Known for: FIFA World Cup Final, 1930

Joannes Julianus "John" Langenus (9 December 1891 in Antwerp, Belgium – 1 October 1952 in Antwerp, Belgium) was a Belgian football referee, who officiated for FIFA in three World Cup competitions, including the first ever World Cup final match in 1930.

== Life and career ==
Contrary to some sources, Langenus's parents actually gave him an Anglicised Christian name, rather than call him "Jean".

Langenus first undertook his refereeing exam only to fail it when he wrongly answered a question posed by examiners. The question asked of him was: "What is the correct procedure if the ball strikes a low-flying plane?". Langenus did not answer and failed the exam.

=== 1928 FAI Cup Final ===
Langenus was selected to officiate the final of the 1927–28 FAI Cup and is the only man to referee both an FAI Cup final and a World Cup final.

=== 1928 Summer Olympics ===
Langenus was selected to officiate at the 1928 Summer Olympics, and he refereed the first round match on 30 May 1928 at the Olympisch Stadion, where Uruguay beat the Netherlands by 2–0 in front of 40,000 people, and confirmed their place in the quarter-finals. He was then given the honour of controlling the bronze medal match, at the same venue on 10 June 1928, between Italy and Egypt, when the African side were soundly beaten by 11 goals to 3 (Schiavio, Banchero and Magnozzi all scored hat-tricks for the winning side).

=== 1930 World Cup ===
In the 1930 FIFA World Cup, held in Uruguay and the first ever to be staged, Langenus handled four matches as referee, plus two as linesman. Two "Group" matches played under his stewardship were followed by the first semi-final between Argentina and the United States on 26 July 1930, which finished 6–1 to the South American side. Langenus officiated all his matches "whatever the heat, in cap and plus-fours". The Americans played 80 minutes of the game "with one player missing (broken leg after 10 minutes)" - "substitutes weren't allowed, so the United States played on with only 10 men". There was also an incident involving one of the US medical staff, after Langenus had given a foul against one of the American players; "the team's medical attendant raced, bellicose, on to the field, to berate Langenus. Having had his say, he flung his box of medicines to the ground, the box burst open, various bottles smashed, including one full of chloroform, and its fumes rose to overpower the American. He was helped from the field."

He then received the notable honour of controlling the final, on 30 July 1930 at the Estadio Centenario in Montevideo. The home country Uruguay met Argentina, and feelings were running high even before the match; the "big, tough, ruthless centre half" "Argentinian Luis Monti received a death threat" and the referee "demanded a quick escape route plan to get back to his ship". It was Langenus who defused another potentially serious diplomatic issue when he suggested that, instead of choosing a match ball from either the hosts or the challengers (which was being hotly contested before the event), they use one ball in the first half of the Final, and switch to the other team's ball in the second half. This solution was accepted by both sides. Despite all this, "Langenus refereed skilfully, completely unfazed by the masses filling the ... Stadium ... to bursting point" during the game, which finished 4–2 to the hosts, even though "one of the game's most controversial incidents" was the allowing of the first Argentine goal, which some observers took to be offside.

=== 1934 World Cup ===
In the 1934 FIFA World Cup, hosted by Italy, Langenus was involved in only one game, the first round match between Czechoslovakia and Romania at the Stadio Littorio in Trieste on 27 May 1934, which he refereed, and it ended in a 2–1 Czechoslovakia win.

=== 1938 World Cup ===
The only sanction of any kind which John Langenus had to issue in all his matches in charge during three World Cups was the dismissal of Germany's Hans Pesser in the 6th minute of extra time during a first round match in the 1938 competition against Switzerland in the Parc des Princes, Paris, France, on 4 June 1938. After 120 minutes of play, the scoreline remained 1–1, and had to be settled by a replay five days later, the Swiss triumphing 4–2 (though Langenus did not handle the decider).

On 19 June 1938, at the Parc de Lescure in Bordeaux, Langenus received his second great career honour, having been chosen to oversee the match for third place between Brazil and Sweden. By resting their tournament top scorer, Leônidas, in the semi-final, Brazil may have caused their own eventual participation in the lesser match instead of gracing the Final as expected. Leônidas scored twice for Brazil, in a 4–2 victory, to help secure third spot.

=== Later career ===
Langenus later wrote three books; an autobiography, "Whistling in the World", and two other football-related works of non-fiction.

== Major matches refereed ==
Date	Match	Tournament	Venue	Result	Ref
30 July 1930	Uruguay vs. Argentina	1930 FIFA World Cup final	Estadio Centenario, Montevideo	4–2	

Preceded by no previous competition	FIFA World Cup final match referees 1930 (Belgium) John Langenus	Succeeded by (Sweden) Ivan Eklind
