= Ernesto Mascheroni =

Uruguayan footballer (1907–1984)

Personal information
- Full name: Ernesto Alberto Mascheroni Castiglioni
- Date of birth: 21 November 1907
- Place of birth: Montevideo, Uruguay
- Date of death: 3 July 1984 (age 76)
- Place of death: Montevideo, Uruguay
- Height: 1.85 m (6 ft 1 in)
- Position: Defender

Senior career*
Years	Team	Apps	(Gls)
1926–1930	Olimpia	150	(7)
1930–1933	Peñarol	93	(4)
1933–1934	Independiente	35	(3)
1934–1936	Ambrosiana	53	(3)
1936–1940	Peñarol	123	(5)
Total		454	(22)

International career
1929–1939	Uruguay	13	(0)
1935–1936	Italy	2	(0)
Medal record
Men's football
Representing Uruguay and Italy
FIFA World Cup
Gold medal – first place	1930 Uruguay
Central European International Cup
Gold medal – first place	1933-35 Central European International Cup
South American Championship
Silver medal – second place	1939 Peru
- * Club domestic league appearances and goals

Ernesto Alberto Mascheroni Castiglioni (Italian pronunciation: [erˈnɛsto maskeˈroːni]; 21 November 1907 – 3 July 1984) was a footballer from Uruguay. Born in Montevideo, Ernesto was a defender. He played as a left-back.

He played 13 times for the Uruguay between 1929 and 1939, including in the 1930 FIFA World Cup where Uruguay won the first ever World Cup tournament. In 1934, he moved to Italy to play for Ambrosiana (now Inter Milan) until 1936. During this period, he represented the Italy national football team, twice winning the 1933–35 Central European International Cup. He later returned to Uruguay to play for C.A. Peñarol from 1936 to 1940.

By the time of his death in July 1984, at the age of 76, he was the last surviving member of Uruguay's 1930 World Cup winning team; though it would be another 26 years before the death of the last surviving participant of that World Cup.

== Honours ==
Peñarol

- Primera División (AUF): 1936, 1937, 1938

=== International ===
Uruguay

- FIFA World Cup: 1930
- South American Championship: Runner-up 1939

Italy

- Central European International Cup: 1933-35
