= Santos Iriarte =

Uruguayan footballer (1902-1968)

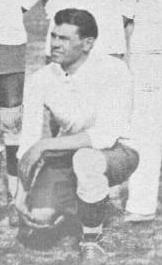
- Iriarte with Uruguay in 1930.

Personal information
- Full name: Victoriano Santos Iriarte
- Date of birth: November 2, 1902
- Place of birth: Canelones, Uruguay
- Date of death: November 10, 1968 (aged 66)
- Place of death: Montevideo, Uruguay
- Position: Forward

Senior career*
Years	Team	Apps	(Gls)
1923–1932	Racing Montevideo	423	(34)
1932–1944	Peñarol	156	(30)
Total		579	(64)

International career
1930–1941	Uruguay	15	(2)
Medal record
Men's football
Representing Uruguay
FIFA World Cup
Winner	1930 Uruguay
- * Club domestic league appearances and goals

Victoriano Santos Iriarte (2 November 1902 – 10 November 1968), nicknamed "El Canario" (The Canary), was a Uruguayan football forward, member of the Uruguay national team that won the first-ever World Cup in 1930, and of Racing Club de Montevideo at the club level.

Iriarte, an outside left, played all four of Uruguay's matches in the 1930 World Cup and scored two goals; one in the semifinal against Yugoslavia and one in the 68th minute of the final match to give Uruguay a 3–2 lead in their comeback win against Argentina.

== International goals ==
Uruguay's goal tally first

#	Date	Venue	Opponent	Score	Result	Competition
1.	27 July 1930	Estadio Centenario, Montevideo, Uruguay	Yugoslavia	4–1	6–1	1930 FIFA World Cup
2.	30 July 1930	Estadio Centenario, Montevideo, Uruguay	Argentina	3–2	4–2	1930 FIFA World Cup Final
