= Pedro Cea =

Spanish-Uruguayan footballer and coach (1900-1970)

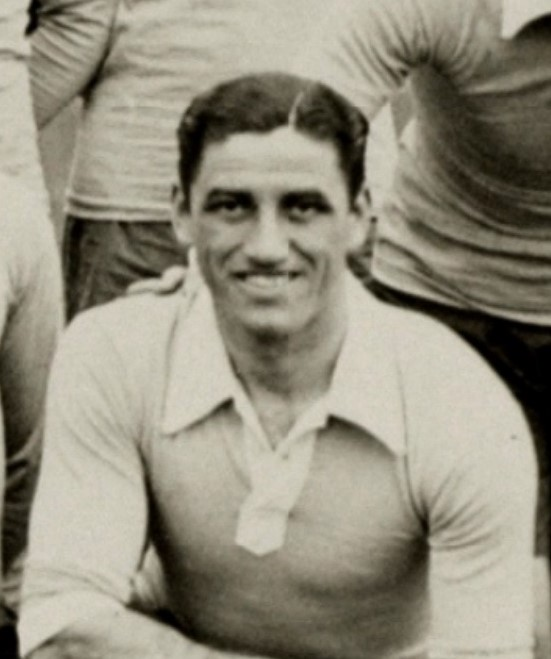
- Pedro Cea in 1928

Personal information
- Full name: José Pedro Cea Urriza
- Date of birth: 1 September 1900
- Place of birth: Redondela, Spain
- Date of death: 18 September 1970 (aged 70)
- Place of death: Montevideo, Uruguay
- Height: 1.72 m (5 ft 8 in)
- Position: Striker

Senior career*
Years	Team	Apps	(Gls)
1922–1927	Central Atletico Lito	231	(111)
1928	Bella Vista	26	(17)
1929–1934	Nacional	325	(138)
Total		582	(266)

International career
1923–1932	Uruguay	26	(13)

Managerial career
- 1941–1942: Uruguay
Medal record
Men's football
Representing Uruguay
Olympic Games
Gold medal – first place	1924 Paris	Team
Gold medal – first place	1928 Amsterdam	Team
FIFA World Cup
Winner	1930 Uruguay
South American Championship
Winner	1923 Uruguay
Winner	1924 Uruguay
Third place	1929 Argentina
- * Club domestic league appearances and goals

José Pedro Cea Urriza (1 September 1900 – 18 September 1970) was a Uruguayan football player as a striker and coach.

== Playing career ==
=== Club career ===
Cea was born in Redondela, Spain. At club level, he played for Nacional, where he won several Uruguayan championships.

=== International career ===
Cea made his debut for Uruguay in November 1923. He was part of Uruguay's championship-winning team at the 1923 South American Championship.

In 1924 Cea again won a continental championship as Uruguay won their fifth title at the 1924 tournament.

Cea won gold medals at both the 1924 and 1928 Summer Olympics.

He was Uruguay's leading goalscorer in the 1930 FIFA World Cup. He scored the crucial equalising goal in the World Cup final against Argentina, levelling the score to 2–2 in the 57th minute; Uruguay went on to win 4–2. He also won the first-ever FIFA World Cup Silver Boot.

Cea played his last international match in 1932, having played 27 times for la Celeste.

== Managerial career ==
Cea was the manager of the national team in 1941 and 1942, managing the team that won the 1942 South American Championship.

== Death ==
He died in 1970 aged 70 years 17 days old.

== Career statistics ==
=== International ===
Appearances and goals by national team and year
National team	Year	Apps	Goals
Uruguay	1923	3	1
Uruguay	1924	10	6
Uruguay	1925	0	0
Uruguay	1926	0	0
Uruguay	1927	1	0
Uruguay	1928	5	1
Uruguay	1929	2	0
Uruguay	1930	4	5
Uruguay	1931	0	0
Uruguay	1932	1	0
Total		26	13

=== International goals ===
Uruguay's goal tally first

#	Date	Venue	Opponent	Score	Result	Competition
1.	25 November 1923	Estadio Gran Parque Central, Montevideo, Uruguay	Brazil	2–1	2–1	1923 South American Championship
2.	26 May 1924	Stade Olympique Yves-du-Manoir, Colombes, France	Yugoslavia	4–0	7–0	1924 Summer Olympics
3.	26 May 1924	Stade Olympique Yves-du-Manoir, Colombes, France	Yugoslavia	7–0	7–0	1924 Summer Olympics
4.	6 June 1924	Stade Olympique Yves-du-Manoir, Colombes, France	Netherlands	1–1	2–1	1924 Summer Olympics
5.	9 June 1924	Stade Olympique Yves-du-Manoir, Colombes, France	Switzerland	2–0	3–0	1924 Summer Olympics Gold Medal match
6.	2 October 1924	Estadio Barracas, Buenos Aires, Argentina	Argentina	1–1	1–2	Friendly
7.	26 October 1924	Estadio Gran Parque Central, Montevideo, Uruguay	Paraguay	3–0	3–1	1924 South American Championship
8.	7 June 1928	Olympic Stadium, Amsterdam, Netherlands	Italy	1–1	3–2	1928 Summer Olympics
9.	21 July 1930	Estadio Centenario, Montevideo, Uruguay	Romania	4–0	4–0	1930 FIFA World Cup
10.	27 July 1930	Estadio Centenario, Montevideo, Uruguay	Yugoslavia	1–1	6–1	1930 FIFA World Cup
11.	27 July 1930	Estadio Centenario, Montevideo, Uruguay	Yugoslavia	5–1	6–1	1930 FIFA World Cup
12.	27 July 1930	Estadio Centenario, Montevideo, Uruguay	Yugoslavia	6–1	6–1	1930 FIFA World Cup
13.	30 July 1930	Estadio Centenario, Montevideo, Uruguay	Argentina	2–2	4–2	1930 FIFA World Cup Final

== Honours ==
=== Player ===
Nacional

- Primera División: 1933, 1934
- Torneo Competencia: 1934

Uruguay

- FIFA World Cup: 1930
- South American Championship: 1923, 1924
- Summer Olympics: 1924, 1928

=== Individual ===
- 1930 FIFA World Cup All-Star Team
- FIFA World Cup Silver Boot: 1930

=== Manager ===
Uruguay

- South American Championship: 1942

== See also ==
- List of FIFA World Cup top goalscorers
