= Juan José Tramutola =

Argentine footballer (1902–1968)

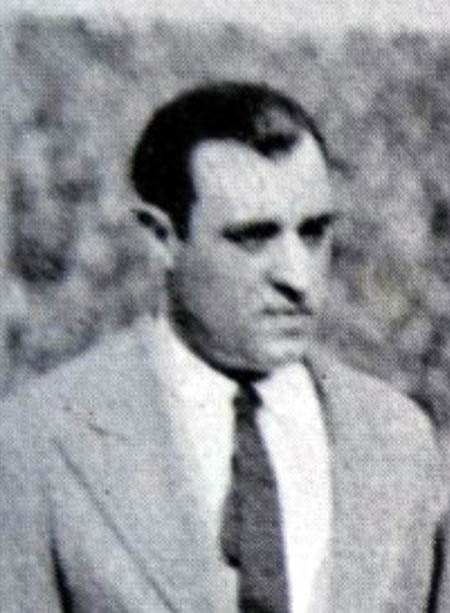

Personal information
- Full name: Juan José Tramutola
- Date of birth: 21 October 1902
- Place of birth: La Plata, Argentina
- Date of death: 30 November 1968 (aged 66)
- Place of death: Remedios de Escalada, Buenos Aires, Argentina

Juan José Tramutola (21 October 1902 — 30 November 1968) was an Argentine football coach. With Argentina he won the 1929 Copa América and finished second at the inaugural World Cup in Uruguay.

Along with mate Francisco Olazar, the two functioned as the two coaches of the Argentine team. Tramutola's title was that of "technical director".

Juan José Tramutola was from January to July 1938 coach of Boca Juniors and led the team to a fifth place in the championship. 1948 he coached Ferrocarril Oeste, which played then in the Second Division. He was also coach of Vélez Sarsfield.
