= Enrique Ballestrero =

Uruguayan footballer (1905-1969)

- Enrique Ballesteros (third from the left standing) with the team of Uruguay in 1930.

Personal information
- Full name: Enrique Pedro Ballestrero Griffo
- Date of birth: 18 January 1905
- Place of birth: Montevideo, Uruguay
- Date of death: 11 October 1969 (aged 64)
- Place of death: Montevideo, Uruguay
- Height: 1.83 m (6 ft 0 in)
- Position: Goalkeeper

Senior career*
Years	Team	Apps	(Gls)
1924–1925	Miramar Misiones		
1926–1934	Rampla Juniors	445	(0)
1930 (loan)	Nacional		
1935–1937	Peñarol		

International career
1930–1937	Uruguay	19	(0)
Medal record
Men's football
Representing Uruguay
FIFA World Cup
Winner	1930 Uruguay
South American Championship
Winner	1935 Peru
Third place	1937 Argentina
- * Club domestic league appearances and goals

Enrique Pedro Ballestrero Griffo (18 January 1905 – 11 October 1969) was a Uruguayan footballer who played as a goalkeeper.

He was a member of the Uruguay squad that won the 1930 FIFA World Cup. He played in all four matches of the tournament, including the final win against Argentina.

== Honours ==
=== International ===
- FIFA World Cup: 1930
- South American Championship: 1935

=== Individual ===
- 1930 FIFA World Cup All-Star Team
