= José Della Torre =

Argentine footballer (1906–1979)

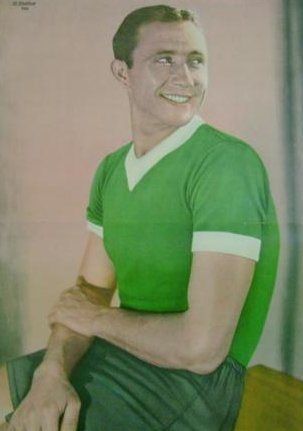
- Della Torre in 1936

Personal information
- Date of birth: 23 March 1906
- Place of birth: San Isidro, Argentina
- Date of death: 31 July 1979 (aged 73)
- Place of death: Lanús, Argentina
- Height: 1.78 m (5 ft 10 in)
- Position: Right-back

Senior career*
Years	Team	Apps	(Gls)
1925–1926	San Isidro		
1927–1933	Racing Club		
1934	América Football Club		
1935–1936	Ferro Carril Oeste	40	(0)
1937	Atlanta	2	(0)

International career
	Argentina	5	(0)

Managerial career
- 1941: Platense
- 1942–1943: Ferro Carril Oeste
- 1945: Everton
- 1947–1948: América FC
- 1949–1952: Ferro Carril Oeste
- 1958: Racing Club
- 1959: Argentina
- 1959–1960: Platense
- 1961: Ferro Carril Oeste
- 1962: Platense
- 1963: Palestino
- 1964: Platense
Medal record
Men's football
Representing Argentina (as manager)
Copa América
Winner	1959 Argentina
Representing Argentina (as player)
FIFA World Cup
Runner-up	1930 Uruguay
- * Club domestic league appearances and goals

José Della Torre (born 23 March 1906 – 31 July 1979) was an Argentine footballer. He played as a right-back for Argentina in the 1930 FIFA World Cup final in which the team lost 4–2 to Uruguay.

After retiring as a player, Della Torre went on to become a football manager. In 1958, he led Racing Club de Avellaneda to the Argentine Primera championship. He also managed Ferro Carril Oeste amongst others.

At the South American Championship of 1959 in Argentina, which was won by the hosts, he was together with Victorio Spinetto and José Barreiro joint manager of the Argentinian team.

== Career overview ==
Player

- 1925-1926: San Isidro
- 1927–1933: Racing Club
- 1934: America FC (RJ)
- 1935–1936: Ferro Carril Oeste
- 1937: CA Atlanta
- 1938–1941: America FC (RJ)

Manager

- 1941: CA Platense
- 1942–1943: Ferro Carril Oeste
- 1945: Everton de Viña del Mar
- 1947–1948: America FC (RJ)
- 1949–1952: Ferro Carril Oeste
- 1958: Racing Club
- 1959: Argentina
- 1959-1960: CA Platense
- 1961: Ferro Carril Oeste
- 1962: CA Platense
- 1963: Palestino
- 1964: CA Platense

== Honours ==
=== Player ===
Racing

- Copa de Honor: 1932
- Copa de Competencia: 1933

Argentina

- FIFA World Cup runner-up: 1930

=== Manager ===
Racing

- Argentine Primera División: 1958

Argentina

- Copa América: 1959
