= Juan Botasso =

Argentine footballer

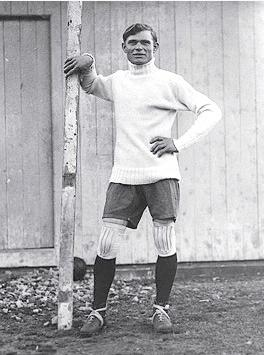
- Botasso in 1928

Personal information
- Full name: Juan Botasso
- Date of birth: 23 October 1908
- Place of birth: Quilmes, Argentina
- Date of death: 5 October 1950 (aged 41)
- Place of death: Quilmes, Argentina
- Height: 1.69 m (5 ft 7 in)
- Position: Goalkeeper

Senior career*
Years	Team	Apps	(Gls)
1927–1930	Argentino de Quilmes		
1930–1938	Racing Club		
1938–1946	Argentino de Quilmes		

International career
1929–1930	Argentina	9	(0)
Medal record
Men's Football
Representing Argentina
Copa América
Winner	1929 Argentina	Team
FIFA World Cup
Runner-up	1930 Uruguay	Team
- * Club domestic league appearances and goals

Juan Botasso (23 October 1908 – 5 October 1950) was an Argentine footballer. He played in goal for Argentina in the 1930 FIFA World Cup final on 30 July 1930, which was lost 4–2 to Uruguay.

Botasso (sometimes written Bottaso) started his career in 1927 with Argentino de Quilmes. After playing in the 1930 World Cup he moved to Racing Club de Avellaneda where he played until 1938. Botasso then returned to Argentino de Quilmes who were playing in the Argentine 2nd Division.

== Honours ==
Racing

- Copa de Honor: 1932
- Copa de Competencia: 1933

Quilmes

- Primera C Metropolitana: 1945

Argentina

- Copa América: 1929
- FIFA World Cup runner-up: 1930
