= Álvaro Gestido =

Uruguayan footballer (1907-1957)

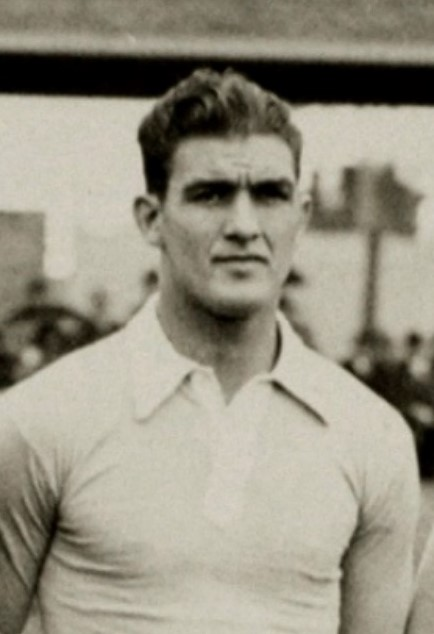
- Álvaro Gestido in 1928

Personal information
- Full name: Álvaro Antonio Gestido Pose
- Date of birth: 17 May 1907
- Place of birth: Uruguay
- Date of death: 18 January 1957 (aged 49)
- Position: Midfielder

Senior career*
Years	Team	Apps	(Gls)
1926–1940	Peñarol	445	(26)

International career
1927–1940	Uruguay	26	(0)
Medal record
Men's football
Representing Uruguay
Olympic Games
Gold medal – first place	1928 Amsterdam	Team
FIFA World Cup
Winner	1930 Uruguay
South American Championship
Third place	1929 Argentina
- * Club domestic league appearances and goals

Álvaro Antonio Gestido Pose (17 May 1907 — 18 January 1957) was a Uruguayan footballer who played as a midfielder for Uruguay national team. He played for Peñarol in club football from 1926 to 1940. He played 26 matches for the national team, winning the 1930 FIFA World Cup and the 1928 Summer Olympics. His brother Óscar Diego Gestido was President of Uruguay in 1967.
