= 1930 FIFA World Cup Group 3 =

Football tournament group stage

Group 3 of the 1930 FIFA World Cup began on 14 July 1930 and concluded on 21 July 1930. Uruguay won the group, and advanced to the semi-finals. Romania and Peru failed to advance.

Romania scored early on in their first match against Peru. The score stayed at 1–0 until Peru found an equalizer in the 75th minute. Romania scored 2 late goals to win the match 3–1. Peru were eliminated 1 match later by hosts Uruguay after 1 goal from Hector Castro was enough to win the match. Uruguay dominated the first half of their game against Romania, scoring 4 goals which was enough to send them through to the knockouts.

== Standings ==
Pos	Team	Pld	W	D	L	GF	GA	GD	Pts	Qualification
1	Uruguay (H)	2	2	0	0	5	0	+5	4	Advance to the knockout stage
2	Romania	2	1	0	1	3	5	−2	2	
3	Peru	2	0	0	2	1	4	−3	0	

Source: ESPN
(H) Hosts

== Matches ==
=== Romania vs Peru ===
14 July 1930
14:50 UYT (UTC−03:30)

Romania	3–1	Peru
Deșu 1' (Note: This is one of several goals for which the statistical details are disputed. The goalscorers and timings used here are those of FIFA, the official record. Some other sources, such as RSSSF, state a different scorer, timing, or both.); Stanciu 79'; Kovács 89'		De Souza 75'

Estadio Pocitos, Montevideo
Attendance: 2,549
Referee: Alberto Warnken (Chile)

Romania
Peru

GK	Ion Lăpușneanu
DF	Rudolf Bürger
DF	Adalbert Steiner
MF	Alfred Eisenbeisser
MF	Emerich Vogl (c)
MF	László Raffinsky
FW	Nicolae Kovács
FW	Adalbert Deșu
FW	Rudolf Wetzer
FW	Constantin Stanciu
FW	Ștefan Barbu
Manager:
Constantin Rădulescu

GK	Juan Valdivieso
DF	Mario de las Casas
DF	Alberto Soria
MF	Plácido Galindo (c)	(red card) 70'
MF	Domingo García
MF	Alberto Denegri
FW	Julio Lores
FW	Alejandro Villanueva
FW	José María Lavalle
FW	Demetrio Neyra
FW	Luis de Souza
Manager:
(Spain) Francisco Bru

Linesmen:
John Langenus (Belgium)
Francisco Mateucci (Uruguay)

=== Uruguay vs Peru ===
18 July 1930
14:30 UYT (UTC−03:30)

Uruguay	1–0	Peru
Castro 65'

Estadio Centenario, Montevideo
Attendance: 57,735
Referee: John Langenus (Belgium)

Uruguay
Peru

GK	Enrique Ballestrero
DF	Domingo Tejera
DF	José Nasazzi (c)
MF	José Leandro Andrade
MF	Lorenzo Fernández
MF	Álvaro Gestido
FW	Santos Urdinarán
FW	Héctor Castro
FW	Pedro Petrone
FW	Pedro Cea
FW	Santos Iriarte
Manager:
Alberto Suppici

GK	Jorge Pardon
DF	Mario de las Casas
DF	Antonio Maquilón (c)
MF	Plácido Galindo
MF	Alberto Denegri
MF	Eduardo Astengo
FW	Julio Lores
FW	Alejandro Villanueva
FW	José María Lavalle
FW	Demetrio Neyra
FW	Luis de Souza
Manager:
(Spain) Francisco Bru

Linesmen:
Thomas Balvay (France)
Henri Christophe (Belgium)

=== Uruguay vs Romania ===
21 July 1930
14:50 UYT (UTC−03:30)

Uruguay	4–0	Romania
Dorado 7'; Scarone 26'; Anselmo 31'; Cea 35'

Estadio Centenario, Montevideo
Attendance: 70,022
Referee: Almeida Rêgo (Brazil)

Uruguay
Romania

GK	Enrique Ballestrero
DF	Ernesto Mascheroni
DF	José Nasazzi (c)
MF	José Leandro Andrade
MF	Lorenzo Fernández
MF	Álvaro Gestido
FW	Pablo Dorado
FW	Héctor Scarone
FW	Peregrino Anselmo
FW	Pedro Cea
FW	Santos Iriarte
Manager:
Alberto Suppici

GK	Ion Lăpușneanu
DF	Rudolf Bürger
DF	Iosif Czako
MF	Alfred Eisenbeisser
MF	Emerich Vogl (c)
MF	Corneliu Robe
FW	Nicolae Kovács
FW	Adalbert Deșu
FW	Rudolf Wetzer
FW	László Raffinsky
FW	Ștefan Barbu
Manager:
Constantin Rădulescu

Linesmen:
Alberto Warnken (Chile)
Ulises Saucedo (Bolivia)

== See also ==
- Romania at the FIFA World Cup
- Peru at the FIFA World Cup
- Uruguay at the FIFA World Cup
