= National University of San Marcos =

Public university in Lima, Peru

- Universidad Nacional Mayor de San Marcos
- Coat of arms
- Latin: Academia S. Marci Vrbis Regvm in Perv
- Former names: Royal and Pontifical University of the City of the Kings of Lima, University of Lima
- Motto: Universidad del Perú, Decana de América
- Motto in English: University of Peru, Dean of the Americas
- Type: Public research university
- Established: May 12, 1551 (475 years ago)
- Founder: Charles I of Spain
- Affiliations: National Association of Public Universities of Peru, International Association of Universities, Iberoamerican Association of Postgraduate Universities, Organización Universitaria Interamericana, Association of Universities of Latin America and the Caribbean, Universia, Fudan-Latin America University Consortium
- Endowment: S/.469 million (FY 2013)
- Rector: Jeri Ramón Ruffner
- Academic staff: 3,315 (2017)
- Students: 37,468 (2020)
- Undergraduates: 30,866
- Postgraduates: 6,602
- Location: Lima, Peru; 12°03′30″S 77°05′00″W
- Campus: 170 acres (69 ha); Urban
- Colors: Gold White Metallic blue Magenta
- Mascot: Lion
- Website: unmsm.edu.pe

The National University of San Marcos (Spanish: Universidad Nacional Mayor de San Marcos, UNMSM) is a public research university located in Lima, the capital of Peru. In the Americas, it is the first officially established (privilege by Charles V, Holy Roman Emperor) and the oldest continuously operating university.

The university started in the general studies that were offered in the convent of the Rosario of the order of Santo Domingo—the current Basilica and Convent of Santo Domingo—on July 1, 1548. Its official foundation was conceived by Fray Thomas de San Martín on May 12, 1551; with the decree of Emperor Charles I of Spain and V of the Holy Roman Empire. In 1571, it acquired the degree of pontifical granted by Pope Pius V, with which it ended up being named the "Royal and Pontifical University of the City of the Kings of Lima". It is also referred to as the "University of Lima" throughout the Viceroyalty.

The University of San Marcos has passed through several locations, of which it maintains and stands out: the "Casona de San Marcos", one of the buildings in the Historic Center of Lima that were recognized as World Heritage Sites by UNESCO in 1988. The University of San Marcos has 66 professional schools, grouped into 20 faculties, and these in turn in 5 academic areas. Through its "Domingo Angulo" historical archive, the university preserves documents and writings. In 2019, the "Colonial Fund and Foundational Documents of the National University of San Marcos: 1551–1852" was incorporated into the UNESCO Memory of the World Register.

It holds a ten-year institutional licensing granted by the National Superintendency of Higher Education (SUNEDU) and an international institutional accreditation. To date, twenty-one Presidents of the Republic of Peru, seven Peruvian candidates for the Nobel Prizes in Physics, Literature, and Peace, and the only Peruvian Nobel Prize laureate have been alumni or professors of this institution.

== History ==
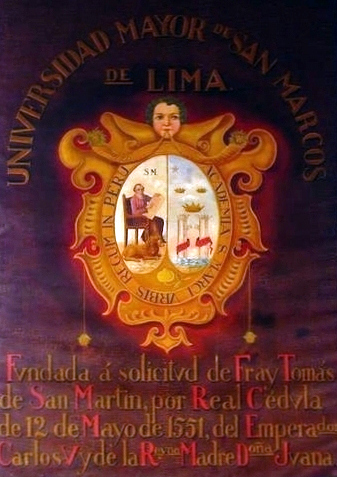
Oil referring to the founding of the University of San Marcos

=== Early history ===
During the General Studies carried out in the cloisters of the Convent of the Rosario of the Order of Santo Domingo—current Basilica and Convento de Santo Domingo—on July 1, 1548, the Cabildo of Lima would send Fray Tomás de San Martín and Captain Juan Jerónimo de Aliaga to Spain, who obtained the founding order of the university from Charles I of Spain and V of the Holy Roman Empire and Queen Juana I of Castile. The foundation of the Royal University of the City of Kings was officially carried out. The university began to function officially on January 2, 1553.

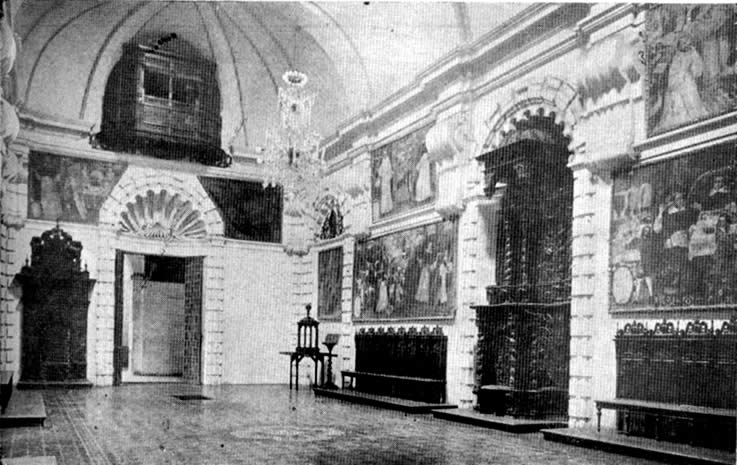
The chapter house in the Convent of the Rosario of the Dominicans

They asked the Royal Court for compliance with the Royal decree of 1570. The university moved to its second location, near the outskirts of San Marcelo, where the Convent of the Order of Saint Augustine had previously operated. The "Royal and Pontifical University of San Marcos" was chosen as its official name on September 6, 1574, with Mark the Evangelist as the patron saint of the University. In 1575, the university changed its location again to the old Plaza del Estanque.

The officially named University of San Marcos began its work in the viceregal era with the faculties of Theology and Arts, later the canons of Law and Medicine would be created. On November 27, 1579, the professors asked King Philip II for the institution of jurisdiction that governed the University of Salamanca. In 1581, Viceroy Francisco Álvarez de Toledo authorized clerics and laymen to be elected.

=== 1700s to 1900s ===
The support for the secularization of the University of San Marcos was given by Viceroy Francisco Álvarez de Toledo. It was also exercised by the rector of the Royal Convictory of San Carlos. Between 1792 and 1811, the amphitheater and medicine chairs began to develop in the Royal Hospital of San Andrés. Both the University of San Marcos and the College of Law and Letters of San Carlos and the College of Medicine of San Fernando began to be watched by the Viceroy because their house professors and students were suspected of envisioning.

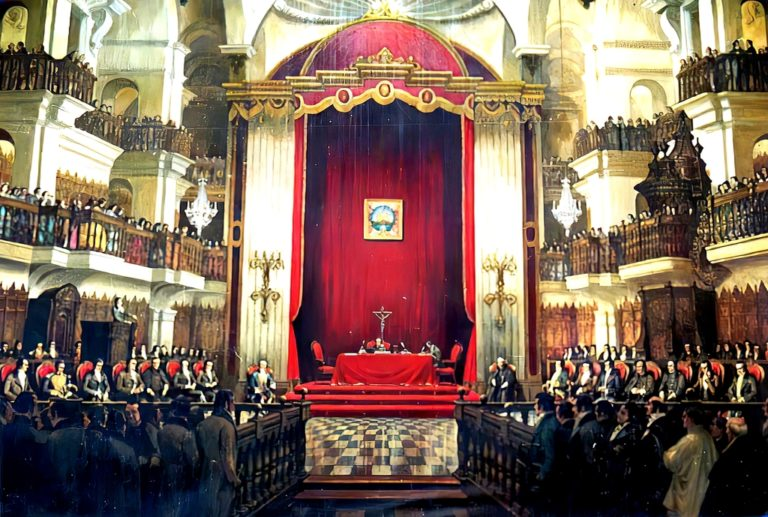
The First Constituent Congress of Peru was chaired by Toribio Rodríguez de Mendoza on September 20, 1822.

The University of San Marcos became part of the current Republic of Peru since its independence in 1821. The First Constituent Congress of Peru was initially chaired by the former rector of the University of San Marcos, Toribio Rodríguez de Mendoza; of the 64 constituent deputies, 54 were San Marcos's alumnus and Carolines's. In 1822, the university handed over its collection of 50,000 books to form the National Library of Peru. In 1840, the Colleges of San Carlos and San Fernando are taken over by the University of San Marcos. San Marcos was empowered by the then President Ramón Castilla to approve new universities and control the newly created ones.

During the 1870s, the university moved to the Casona of San Marcos. During the War of the Pacific and specifically during the occupation of Lima by Chilean troops, art and cultural objects and assets were taken from the university in order to be taken to Chile by sea. At the end of the 19th century, the San Fernando Faculty of Medicine, which was located in a building in the old Plaza de Santa Ana, moved to its current location in the Orchard of Mestas. Once the war ended, by law of 1901, it is stated that Peruvian university education corresponds to the National University of San Marcos and the minor universities of Trujillo, Cusco, and Arequipa, which were later joined by the Catholic University of Lima and technical schools.

=== Modern history ===
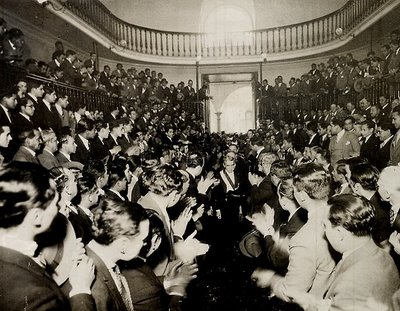
Then President Augusto Leguía after a speech at the university

At the beginning of the 20th century, university activists promoted a reform within the University of San Marcos. In 1909, the students had participated in protests against the Peruvian dictatorial governments. In 1916, the Federation of Students of Peru (FEP) was established, led mainly by students from San Marcos. The FEP's demands included university reforms such as updating curricula, removing untrained faculty, and eliminating Peruvian government interference in the university. The university educational system was later reorganized and university autonomy was granted.

In 1946, the university's name was made official as the Universidad Nacional Mayor de San Marcos. In 1951, as a commemoration of the 400th anniversary of the founding of the University of San Marcos, the university acquires a new piece of land to build the new University City, where the Stadium of the University of San Marcos was inaugurated that same year. A ceremony was also held that brought together the rectors of the main Ibero-American universities, who decided to give her the title of "Dean of America". Due to this, the university has retained the names of the University of Peru and the Dean of the Americas.

In 1958, then Vice President Richard Nixon had scheduled a conference at the University of San Marcos as part of his visit to Latin America; however, this did not take place due to the protest of San Marcos, who spoke out against US policy in the region with phrases such as "Nixon, Go Home!". The conference was transferred to the Catholic University of Lima.

In the mid-1960s, several faculties of the university began to move to the Ciudad Universitaria site, where 17 of the 20 faculties are currently located. On September 22, 1984, the current statute of the university was promulgated. It had nearly 40,000 students and more than 4,000 faculty. In 2010, a Nobel Prize was awarded to Mario Vargas Llosa, a student of the University of San Marcos. As a tribute, on March 30, 2011, the university distinguished Vargas Llosa with its highest decoration: the San Marcos Medal of Honor in the degree of Grand Cross. The ceremony was held in the Casona de San Marcos. In 2019, the university awards a doctoral degree based on a thesis written and defended entirely in Quechua.

Albert Einstein to San Marcos

Images
- Manuscript in german by Albert Einstein in gratitude to the UNMSM (courtesy: HUJI)

Audio
- Audio of Albert Einstein in gratitude to the UNMSM (courtesy: HUJI)

=== University symbols ===
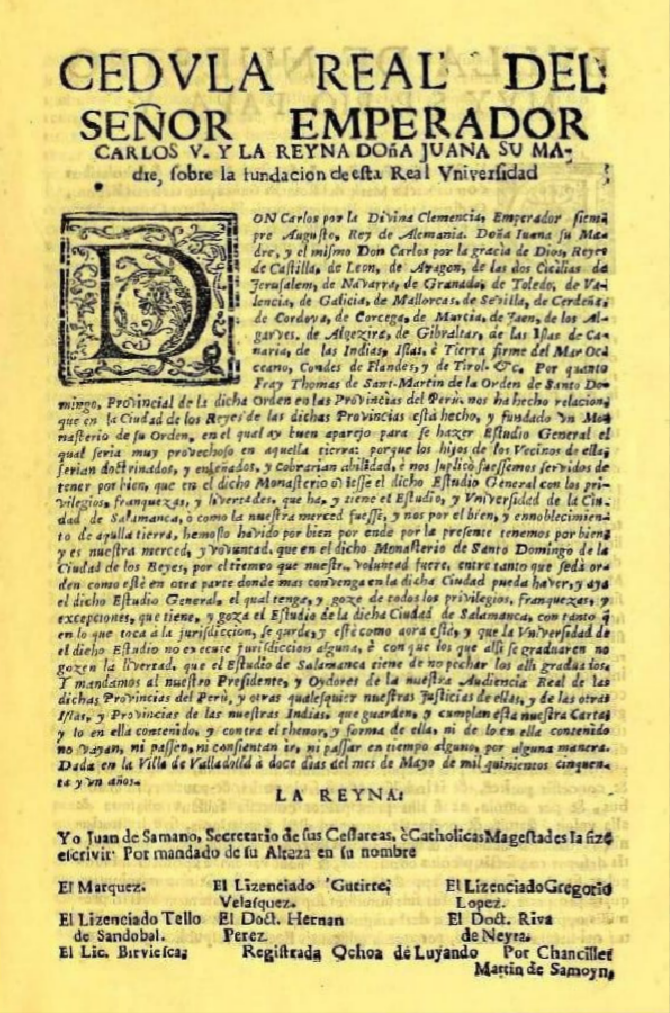
Royal Decree in which Emperor Charles V authorized the creation of the National University of San Marcos

Since its foundation until 1574, the first official shield showed an image of the Virgen del Rosario, considered the patron saint of the Dominican friars; on the right, a representation of the Pacific Ocean; and below a lime—fruit, referring to the city of Lima. The coat of arms was approved by King Charles I of Spain in 1551. By the end of 1570, after the papal bull of Pius V, the coat of arms was modified, replacing the image of the Virgen del Rosario with that of the new patron of the university, the apostle Saint Mark and the Lion. For the coat of arms, the documents about them in the century were black and white. It was not until 1929 that the colors, blue for the 'ocean', black or brown for the image of the saint, light blue for the background, and silver for the columns, became used. The second original shield with the image of San Marcos has been the longest-lasting symbol of the university. In 1929, the original colors were officially introduced: blue for the 'ocean', black or brown for the image of the saint, light blue for the background, and silver for the columns.

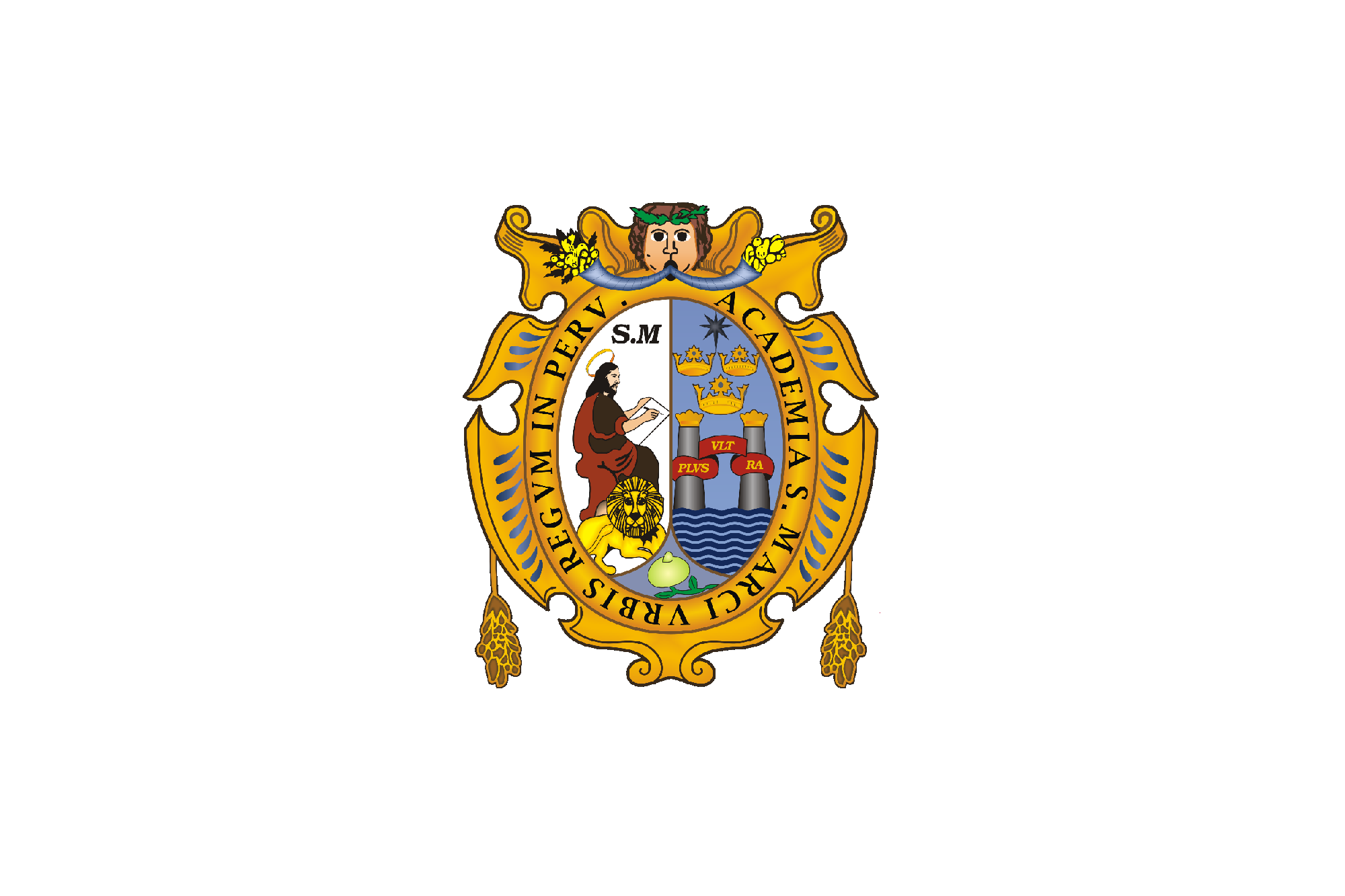
Flag of the University of San Marcos; the emblem represents the institution, and the white background represents the variety of academic colors of each faculty.

==== Flag ====
UNMSM anthem
Adelante San Marcos glorioso
adelante tú siempre estarás,
porque nadie ha podido vencerte
y jamás nadie te vencerá. (bis)

Es tu nombre un timbre de orgullo
Tradición de nobleza y de honor,
Siempre grande, siempre limpia
tu bandera muy alto estará.

Sanmarquinos unidos por siempre
en tan grande y profunda misión,
levantemos muy alto la frente
Convencidos de nuestro valor.

In ancient manuscripts, it was indicated that the university's official banner was composed of major shields centered on a white background; this description gave rise to the appearance of banners and flags of the university that followed these patterns during the 17th to 19th centuries. Although the use of a white flag with the shield of the university in the center had already been generalized, its use was recently made official through a rectoral resolution on June 14, 2010.

==== Anthem ====
The university anthem is regularly performed at special ceremonies and anniversaries of the University of San Marcos, mainly by the University Choir. The lyrics of the anthem were composed by Manuel Tarazona Camacho, and the music by Luis Craff Zevallos.

The National University of San Marcos also mentions other symbolic documents for the university. Among them are the Royal Certificate by which King Charles I of Spain authorized the foundation of the university in 1551, and the Quipu found in the Huaca San Marcos.

== Organization ==
=== Governance and administration ===
Chronological Series of the 214 Rectors of the University of San Marcos

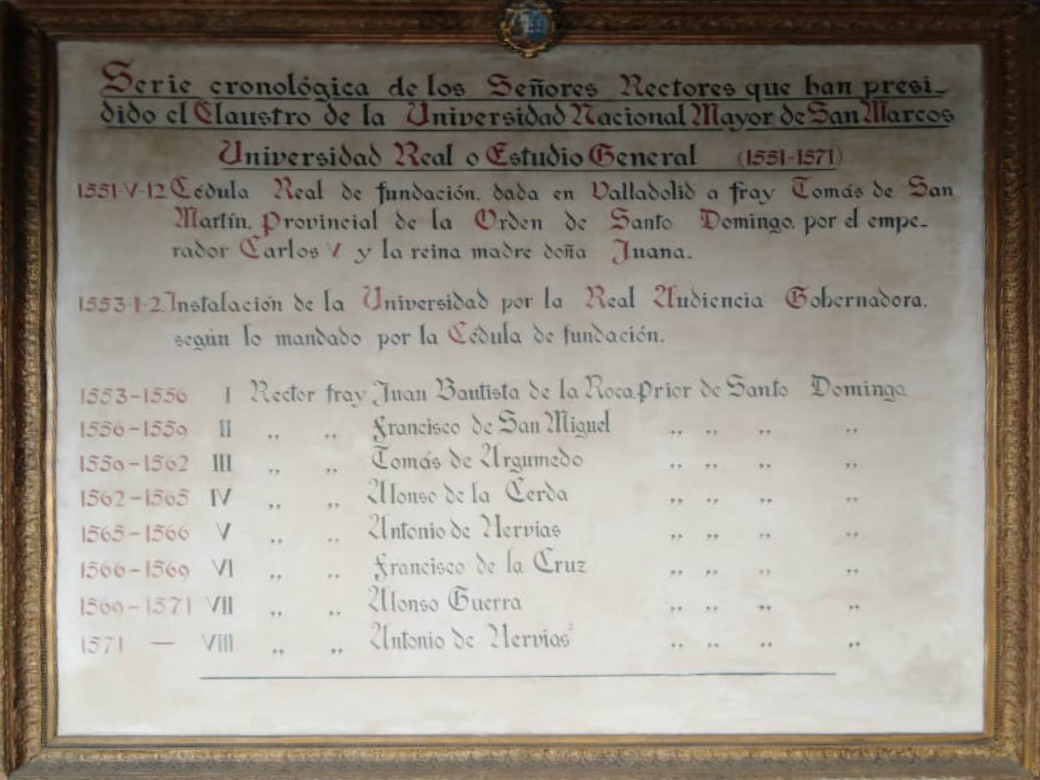
1551–1571

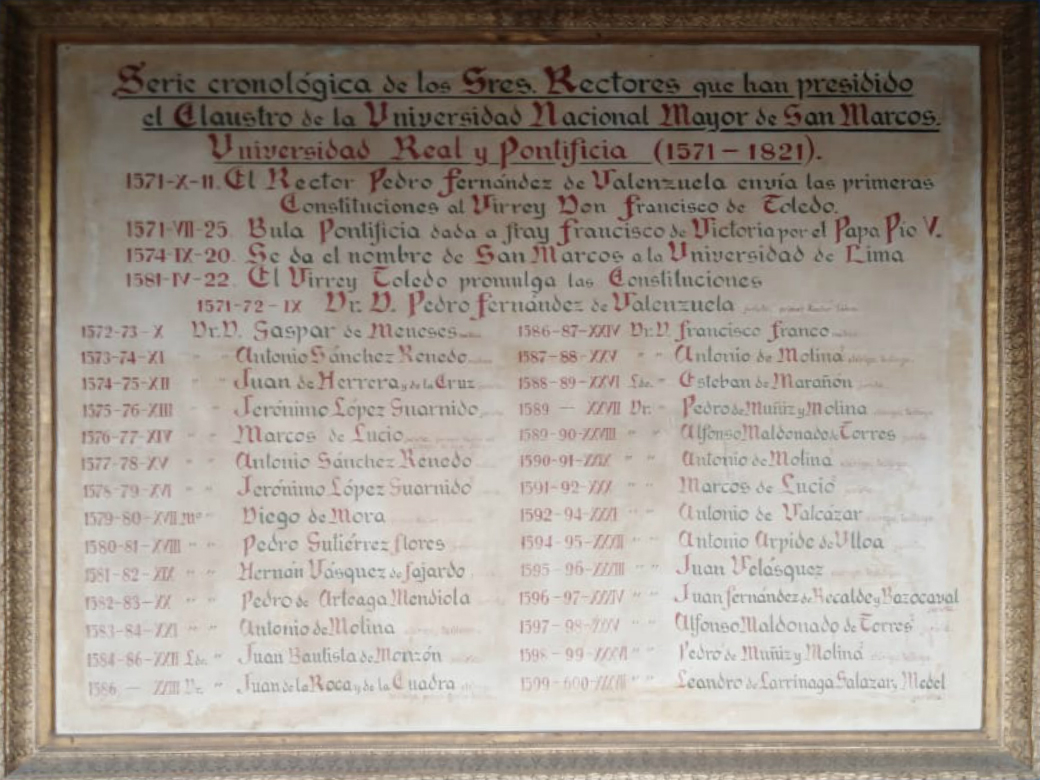
1571–1600

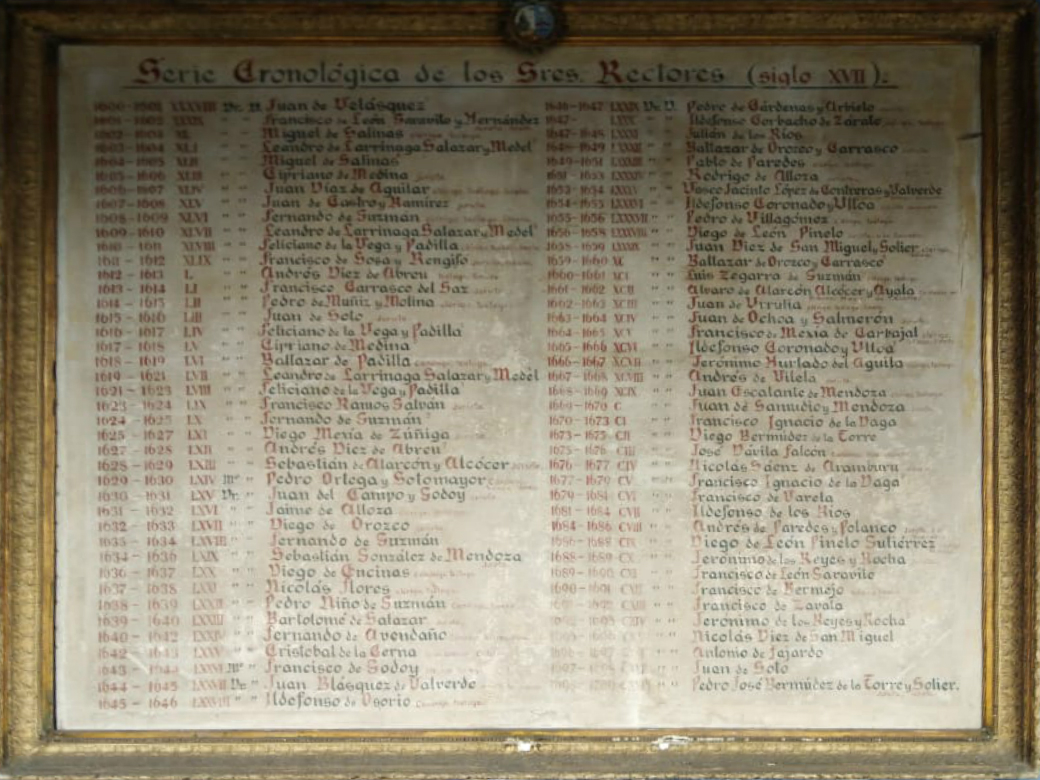
1600–1700

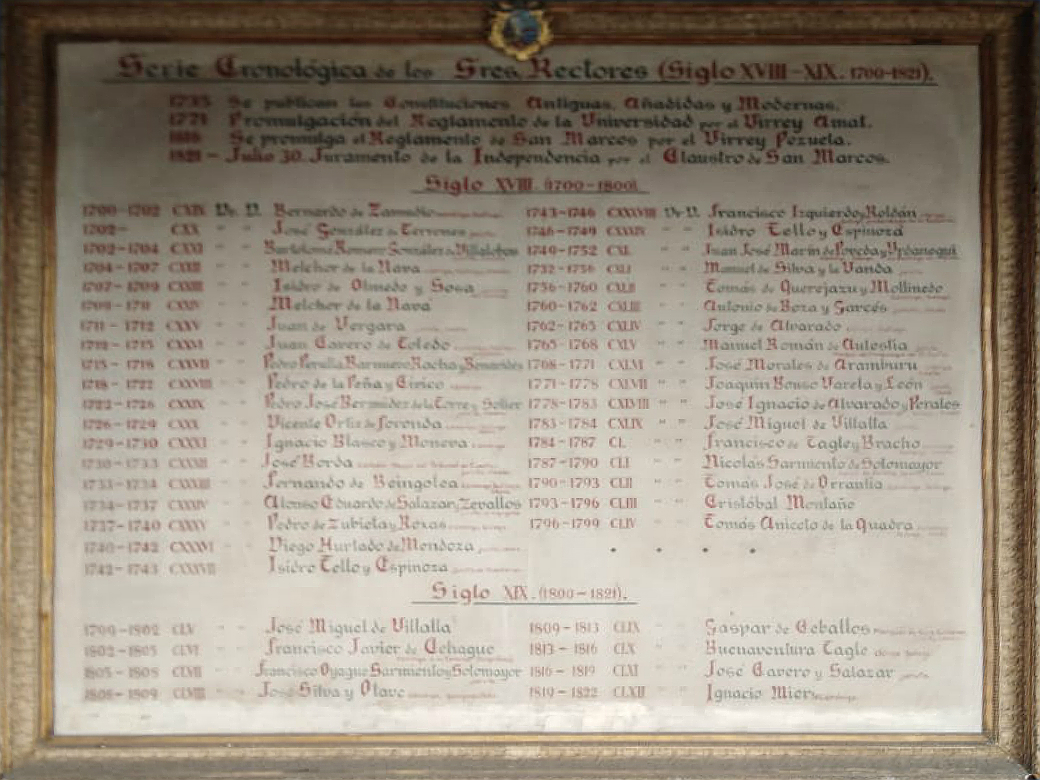
1700–1822

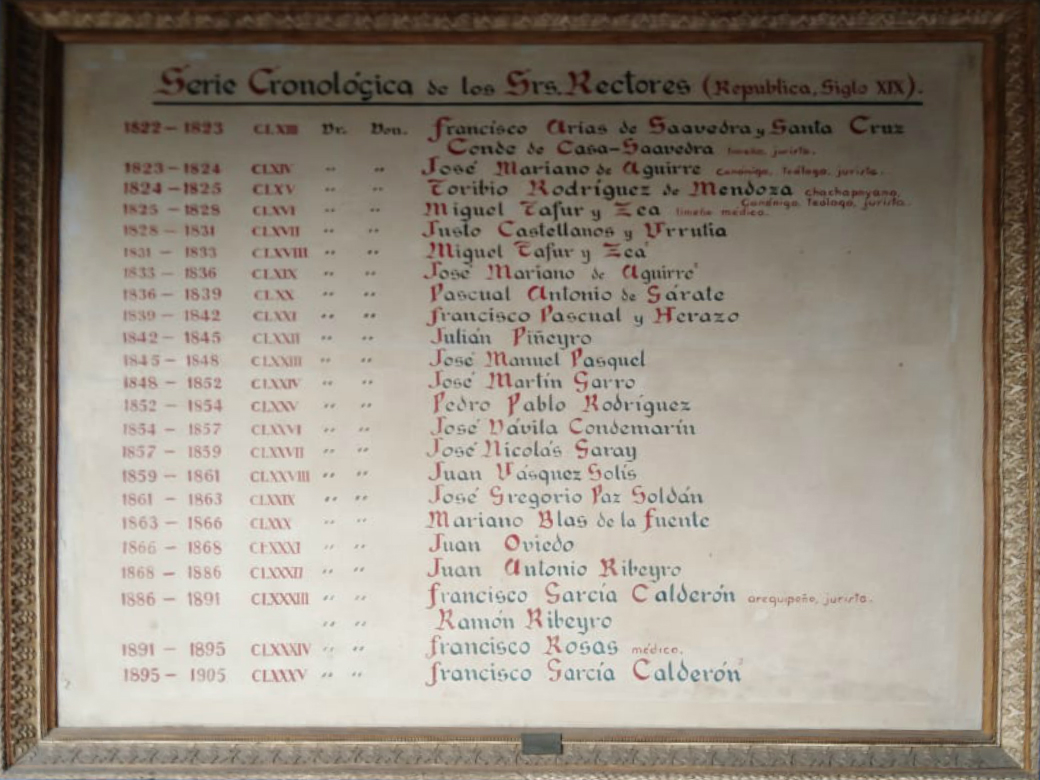
1822–1905

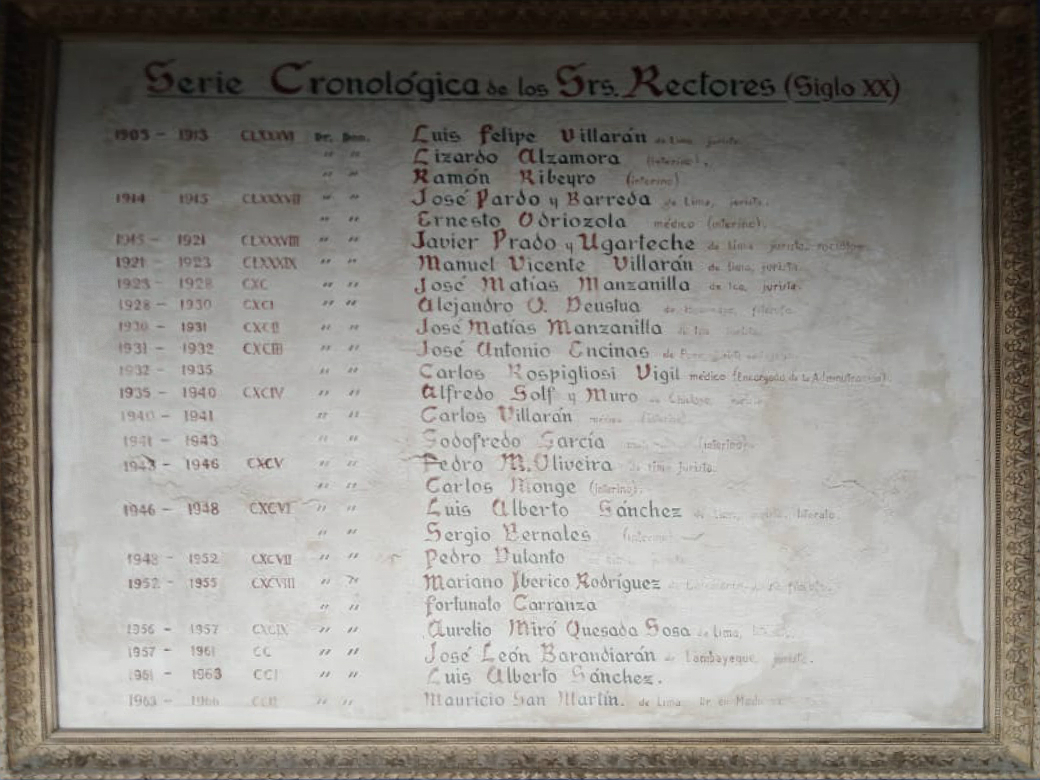
1905–1966

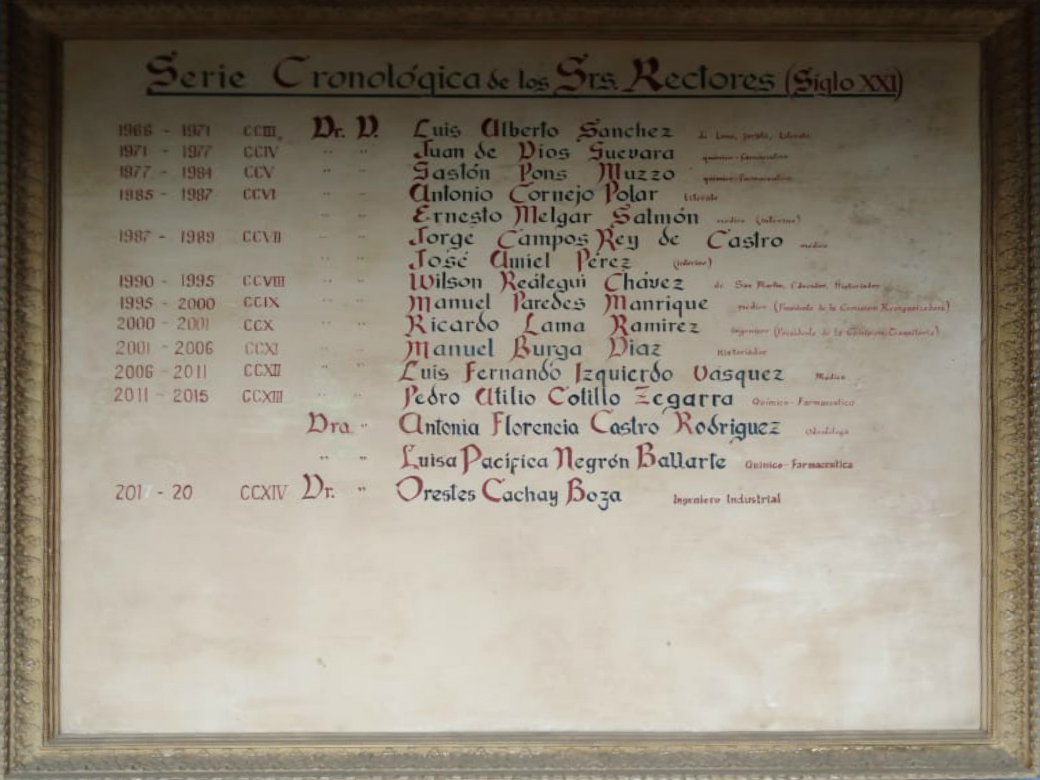
1966–2022

The University of San Marcos was originally governed by clerics of monastic orders; during the Age of Enlightenment, the Bourbon Reforms transformed it into a secular institution. The University Assembly is the highest governing body in the university. It is made up of the rector and the two vice-rectors, the deans of the faculties, the director of the graduate school, representatives of the teachers, and representatives of the students—which constitute a third of the total number of members of the assembly—representatives of the graduates, and the president of the Federation of students of the University of San Marcos with the right to speak, without a vote.

Administrative officials of the highest level can attend the assembly when they are required as advisors, without the right to vote. The main attributions of the university assembly are: the modification of the statute of the university, requiring in such a case the majority of its members; approval of the General Plan for the operation of the university and carrying out its evaluation; it is in charge of the election of the rector and vice-rectors.

The University Council is the body in charge of the direction and execution of the university. The representative of the graduates and the president of the Federation of Students have the right to speak, without a vote. Administrative officials of the highest level can attend the council when they are required as advisers, without the right to vote. The powers of the council are: to formulate the general plan for the development and operation of the university, as well as to establish its policies.

The Rectorate is the university's governing body, consisting mainly of the Rector. The rector is the first executive authority of the university, as well as its legal representative and its institutional image. The University of San Marcos has had 216 rectors since its foundation. Its Vice-Rectorate is made up of two vice-rectors: one for undergraduate academics and the other for research and postgraduate. The government and administration of the faculties and schools are in charge of the Deans and the School Directors, respectively. In addition, the postgraduate units of each faculty are in charge of their respective directors, with the Director of the Graduate School as the general director.

=== Faculties and academic structure ===
The University of San Marcos has 20 faculties grouped into 5 academic areas, in which 65 undergraduate programs, 77 master's degrees, and 27 doctorates are offered.

==== Health Sciences ====
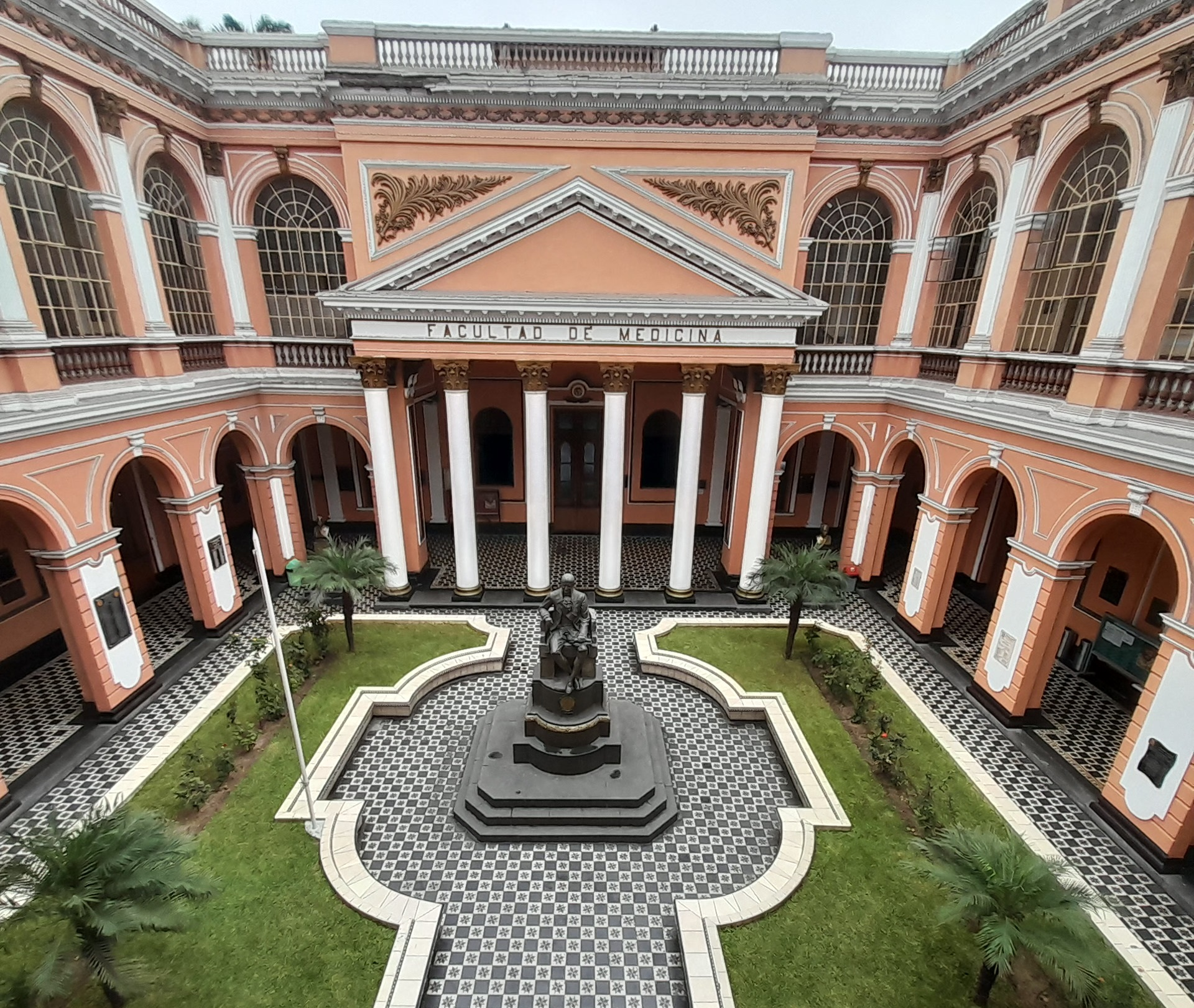
Interior of the main building of the campus of the Faculty of Medicine "San Fernando"

Faculty of Medicine San Fernando is the Faculty of Human Medicine of the University of San Marcos. It is also called the "San Fernando" Faculty of Medicine. After the creation of the Royal College of Medicine and Surgery of San Fernando in 1811, it was installed as faculty on October 6, 1856, by Cayetano Heredia. In the National Medical Exams in Peru, the "San Fernando" Faculty of Medicine has obtained first place on numerous occasions.

The Faculty of Pharmacy and Biochemistry was started in 1931. It would not be until October 29, 1943, that the law approved the creation of the Faculty of Pharmacy and Biochemistry. The faculty offers studies of undergraduate, specialization, and postgraduate. The Faculty of Dentistry was created in 1920. In the following year, this institute was incorporated. It has dental clinics.

The National School of Agronomy and the Chorrillos Military School would come together, creating the National School of Veterinary Sciences, which in 1946 would become the current Faculty of Veterinary Medicine. In 1956, the faculty moved to its current location in San Borja. The Faculty of Psychology was created in 1963.

==== Basic Sciences ====
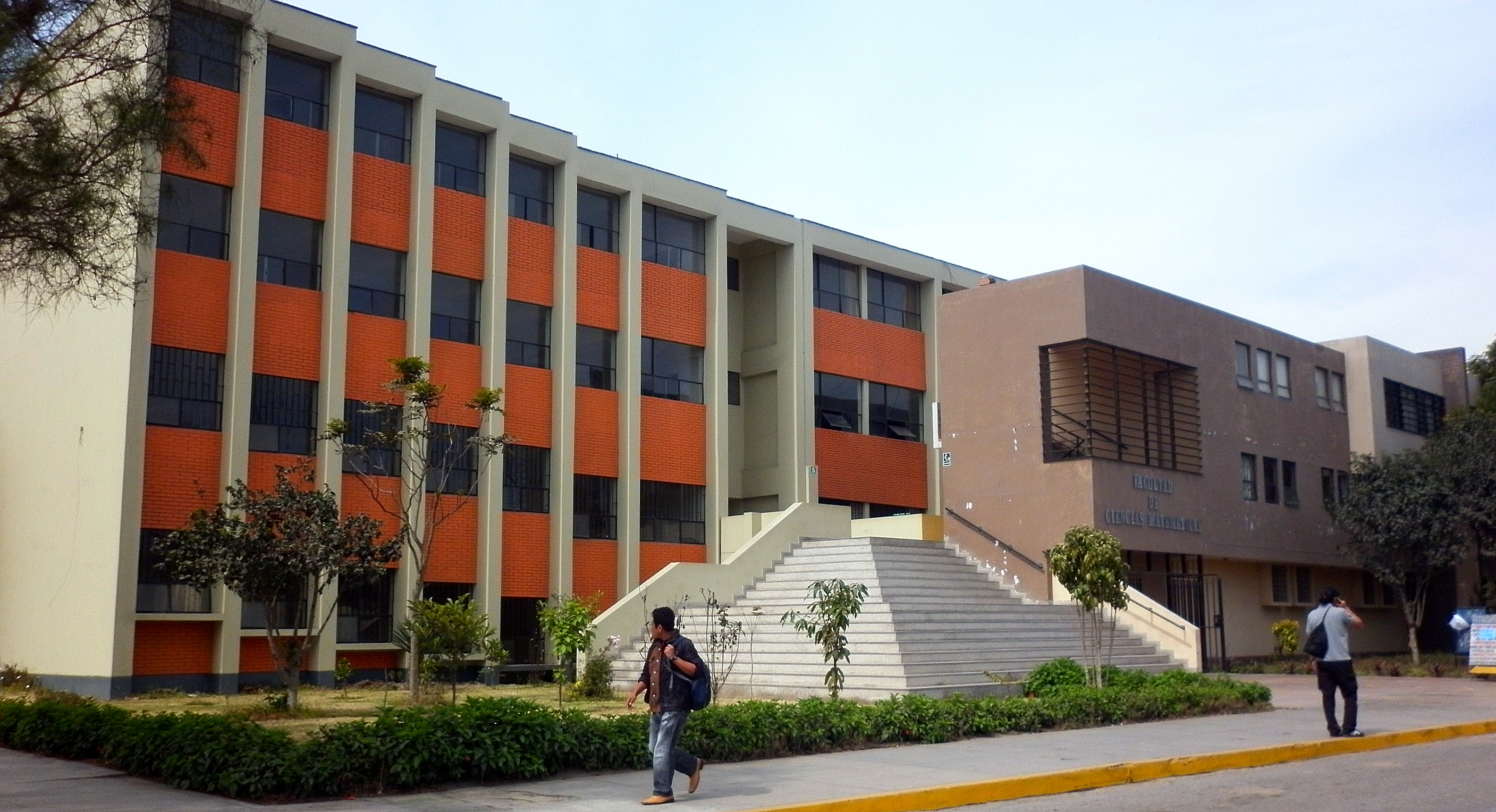
Main pavilion of the Faculty of Mathematical Sciences

The Faculty of Chemistry and Chemical Engineering was created on April 7, 1855. The faculty was started by Antonio Raimondi and José Eboli. In 1946, then President José Luis Bustamante y Rivero promulgated Law 10555, which created the Faculty of Chemistry at the University of San Marcos. On April 24, 1964, the study of chemical engineering was introduced, with which the faculty acquired the current name of Faculty of Chemistry and Chemical Engineering.

The Faculty of Biological Sciences became independent on March 15, 1866. In the 20th century, there was a reform of the biological sciences study program and the granting of the professional title of biologist was established. The Faculty of Physical Sciences was officially instituted in 1966. The Faculty of Mathematical Sciences began its operation in the year 1850. In 1862, it was called the Faculty of Natural Sciences and Mathematics; in 1876, it was named the Faculty of Sciences. It is located in Ciudad Universitaria.

==== Engineering ====
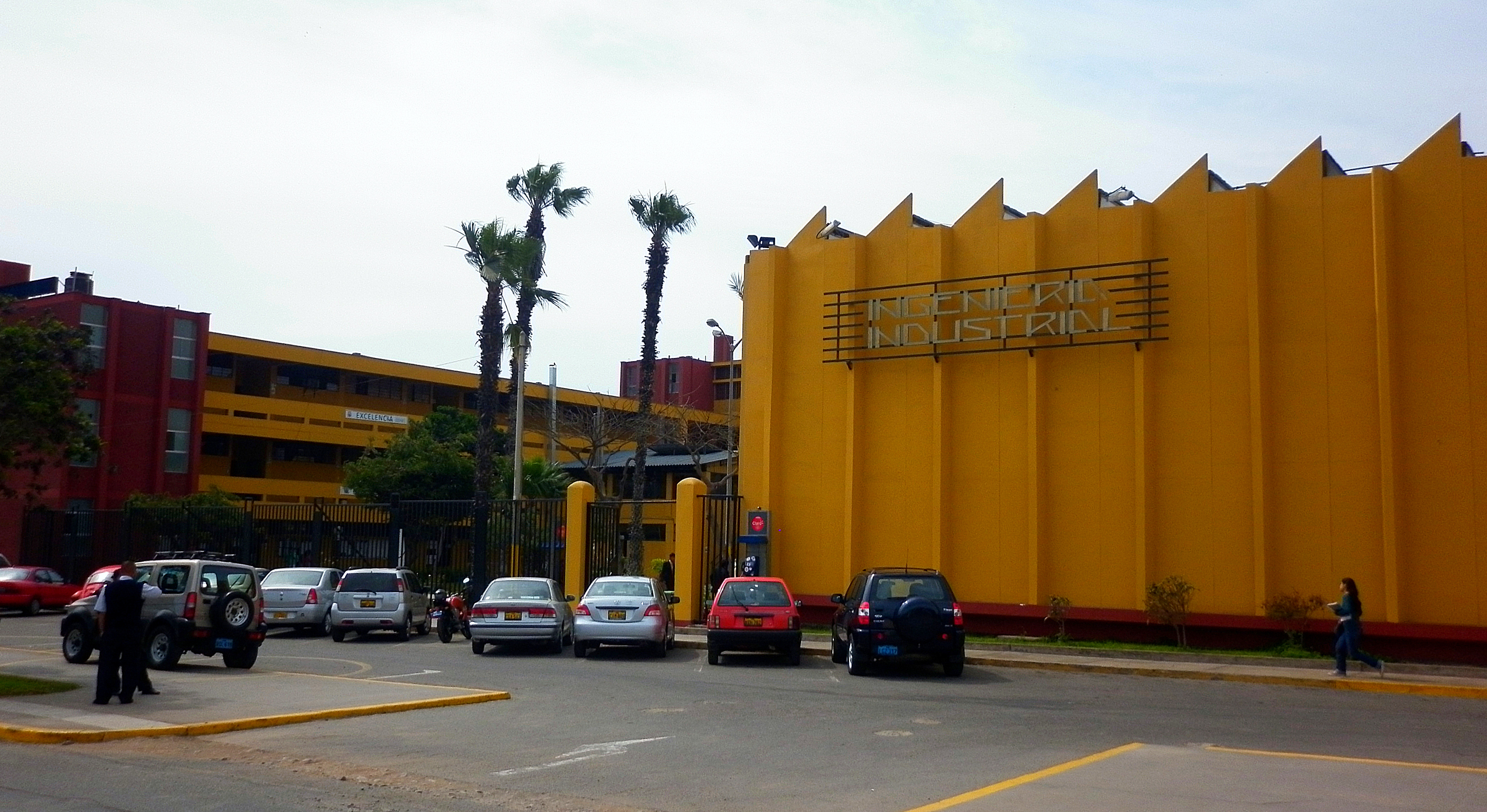
Main pavilion of the Faculty of Industrial Engineering

In 1971, the School of Metallurgical Engineering was created. The School of Mining Engineering was created on November 5, 1980. The School of Geographic Engineering was created on the next day on November 6, 1980. In 1983, the university assembly approved the creation of the Faculty of Geology, Mines, Metallurgy, Geographical Sciences, and Fluid Mechanics. In 2009 and 2014, the School of Civil Engineering and the School of Environmental Engineering were created respectively; this being the final conformation of the current Faculty of Geological, Mining, Metallurgical and Geographic Engineering.

The Faculty of Industrial Engineering was established in 1969. However, this program did not function independently until 1982. The Faculty of Electronic and Electrical Engineering was branched out from the electrical and electronic courses at the Faculty of Physical Sciences.

Faculty of Systems Engineering and Informatics's main antecedent is the School of Computing, which was founded with the French government in the Faculty of Mathematical Sciences in 1969. In 1996, the school of Systems Engineering was created. On October 30, 2000, by rectory resolution, the Faculty of Systems Engineering and Informatics of the University of San Marcos was created.

==== Economics and Management Sciences ====
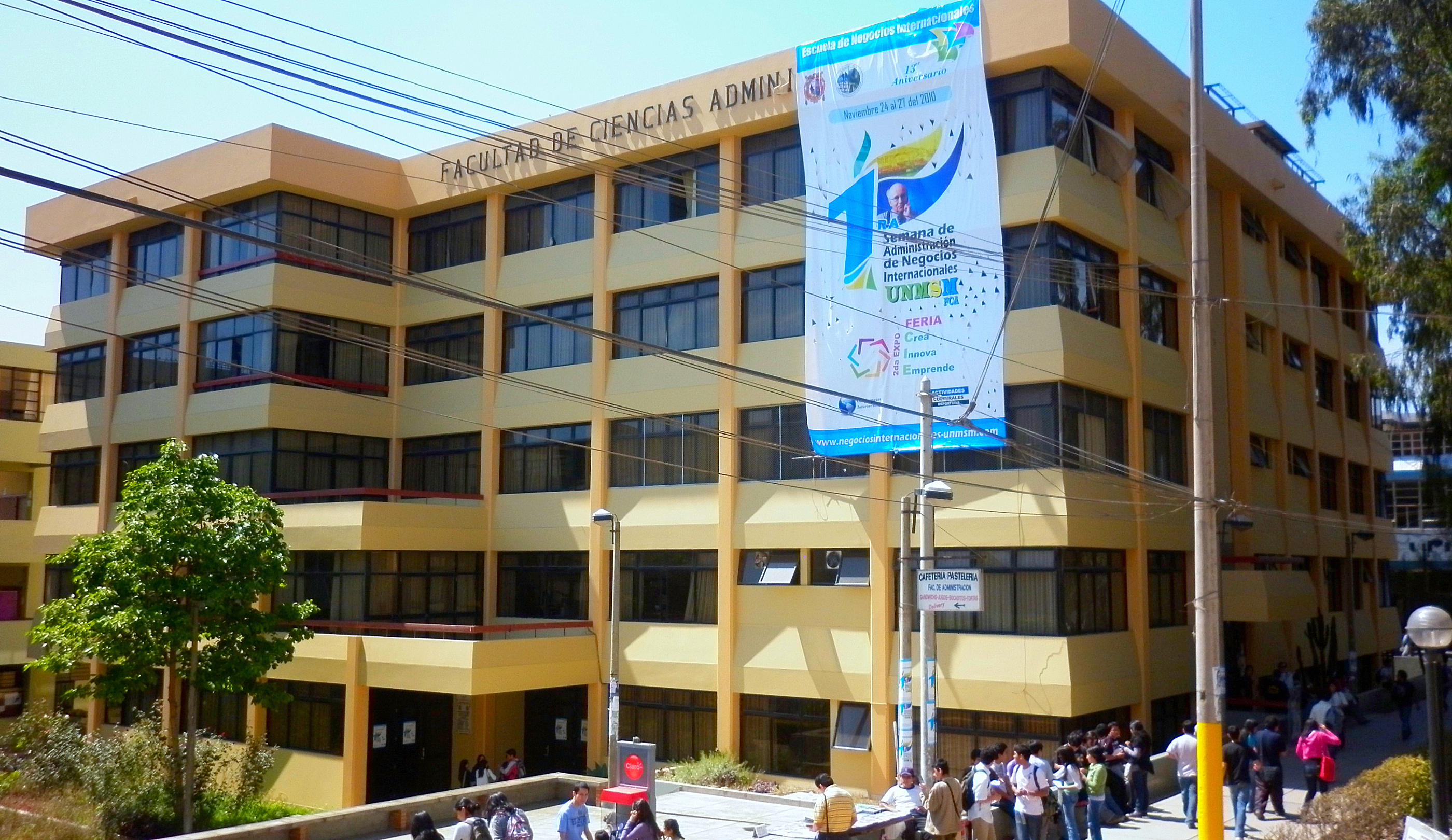
Main pavilion of the Faculty of Administrative Sciences

The Faculty of Administrative Sciences, the Faculty of Accounting Sciences, and the Faculty of Economic Sciences started as part of the studies at the Faculty of Political and Administrative Sciences. In 1920, the faculties were restructured and broken down. In 1984, the creation of an independent faculty for the study of administration was established, which is the current Faculty of Administrative Sciences.

==== Humanities, and Legal and Social Sciences ====
The Faculty of Letters and Human Sciences started from the faculties of theology and arts, which would later derive the Faculty of Letters. In 1854, under the government of Ramón Castilla, it adopted the name of Faculty of Philosophy and Humanities. In the 20th century, the faculty changed its name several times until 1965, when it was given the current name. It is currently located in the University City. The faculty is in charge of various research institutes and museums, such as the Museum of Art and the Language Center of the University of San Marcos.

The Faculty of Education started with the authorization of the then president of Peru, Manuel Pardo y Lavalle, at the Pedagogy on March 18, 1876. On December 14, 1925, the Pedagogy section was created in the Faculty of Letters. It would not be until April 24, 1946, that with the promulgation of the University Statute of 1946, the Faculty of Education was created at the University of San Marcos. It is located mainly in the University City; it also has the San Marcos Application College.

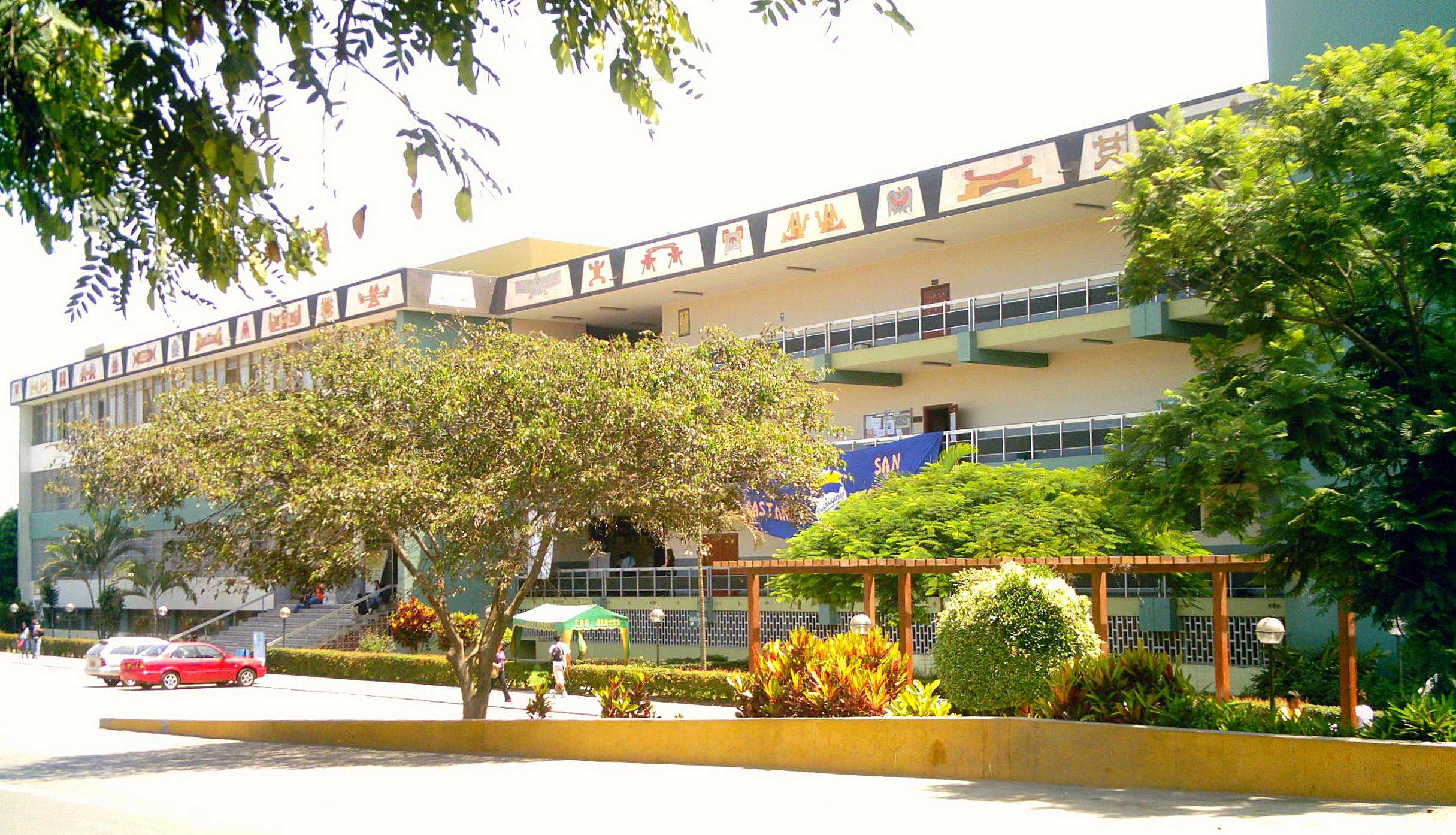
Main pavilion of the Faculty of Law and Political Science

In 1770, the historic Real Convictorio de San Carlos was founded—merging the existing San Felipe College of Law and the San Martín College of Philosophy and Law. On June 28, 1935, a new university statute was issued, in which it was called the Faculty of Law and Political Science. It has a free legal office for its service.

In 1969, with the promulgation of the Organic Law of the Peruvian University, the Department of Historical-Social Sciences is created. On September 24, 1984, in accordance with the University Law, a new administrative academic structure created the Faculty of Social Sciences. The faculty is in charge of the university's Museum of Archeology and Anthropology.

== Academics ==
=== Admissions ===
Admission for undergraduate studies is mainly through an entrance examination. Although there are ways to carry out a special exam in the case of transfers, foreigners, first places in schools, and the disabled. The most required type of exam is the one that is carried out twice a year: in March and in September.

In the case of postgraduate studies, admission is made through enrollment. As there are a limited number of vacancies, an admission exam is carried out that is prepared and graded by a special jury according to the area of study to which it is applied. In 2020, after the suspension of the first admission exam on March 12 due to the COVID-19 pandemic and after more than six months of not applying it, the University Council decided to approve the application of the online admission exam, being the first of its kind in the history of the university, on October 2 and 3 of that same year.

=== International programs ===
The University of San Marcos is actively involved in fostering international cooperation and engagement through various academic programs, research collaborations, and global partnerships. In addition, the university has counted as a main member of the Strategic Alliance of Peruvian Universities with agreements to achieve exchanges of undergraduate and postgraduate students from the three main Peruvian universities—UNMSM, UNI and UNALM—and others Peruvian universities as associated members.

=== Rankings ===
University rankings

Global – Overall
- QS World: 951-1000 (2026)
- THE World: 1501+ (2023)
- USNWR Global: =1778 (2024)

In the first national university ranking in Peru, prepared by the National Assembly of Rectors of Peru under the auspices of UNESCO in 2006, the National University of San Marcos ranked first in the country.

Together with the Cayetano Heredia University and the Pontifical Catholic University of Peru, the National University of San Marcos is one of the only three Peruvian universities—and the only public one—that has managed to rank first nationally in certain editions of different major international university rankings.

In 2021, the Webometrics Ranking of World Universities of the Spanish National Research Council (CSIC) ranked the National University of San Marcos as the best university in the country in its first ranking of the year. In 2022, the university was awarded by the National Council of Science, Technology and Technological Innovation of Peru (Concytec) and the Elsevier corporation for being the institution with the historical highest number of scientific publications in Scopus (6,907), the largest bibliographic database of abstracts and citations of articles in all the universities of Peru.

== Campuses ==
Since its foundation, the University of San Marcos has passed through five different main locations: From 16th to 19th centuries: the first location was located at the premises of the Convent of Nuestra Señora del Rosario of the Dominican Order; the second one was near the outskirts of San Marcelo, shortly before the Convent of the Order of San Agustín had functioned; the third—since 1575—was in the primitive Plaza del Estanque, the current location of the Congress of Peru.

In the second half of the 19th century, it was moved to the premises of the old Convictorio de San Carlos. At the end of the 19th century, the "San Fernando" Faculty of Medicine moved to its permanent location on the current Avenida Grau. Since the mid-1960s, during the government of Manuel Prado, the university began to occupy its main campus, the current Ciudad Universitaria, located between Avenida Universitaria and Avenida Venezuela. The rectory, the Central Library and 17 of the 20 faculties of the university are currently located there.

=== University city ===
Since 1966, the University City of the National University of San Marcos, generally known as "University City of Lima" or simply "University City", is the main campus of the National University of San Marcos. In it are located 17 of the 20 faculties of the University of San Marcos, the Central Library, the Stadium of the University of San Marcos, and one of the university residences. In addition, the City includes the archaeological complex of Huaca San Marcos. The university has two residence halls for its two main campuses.

Since 2007, road works have been carried out outside the University City. The works were imposed by the former mayor, Luis Castañeda, of the Metropolitan Municipality of Lima. In 2008, specialists from the National University of Engineering and the CDL-College of Engineers of Peru reformulated the municipal works. The works have been stopped by a precautionary measure from the National Institute of Culture (INC) after verifying that these works damaged part of the cultural heritage in the Huaca San Marcos. In January 2011, the new municipal management deemed that the operation was unnecessary.

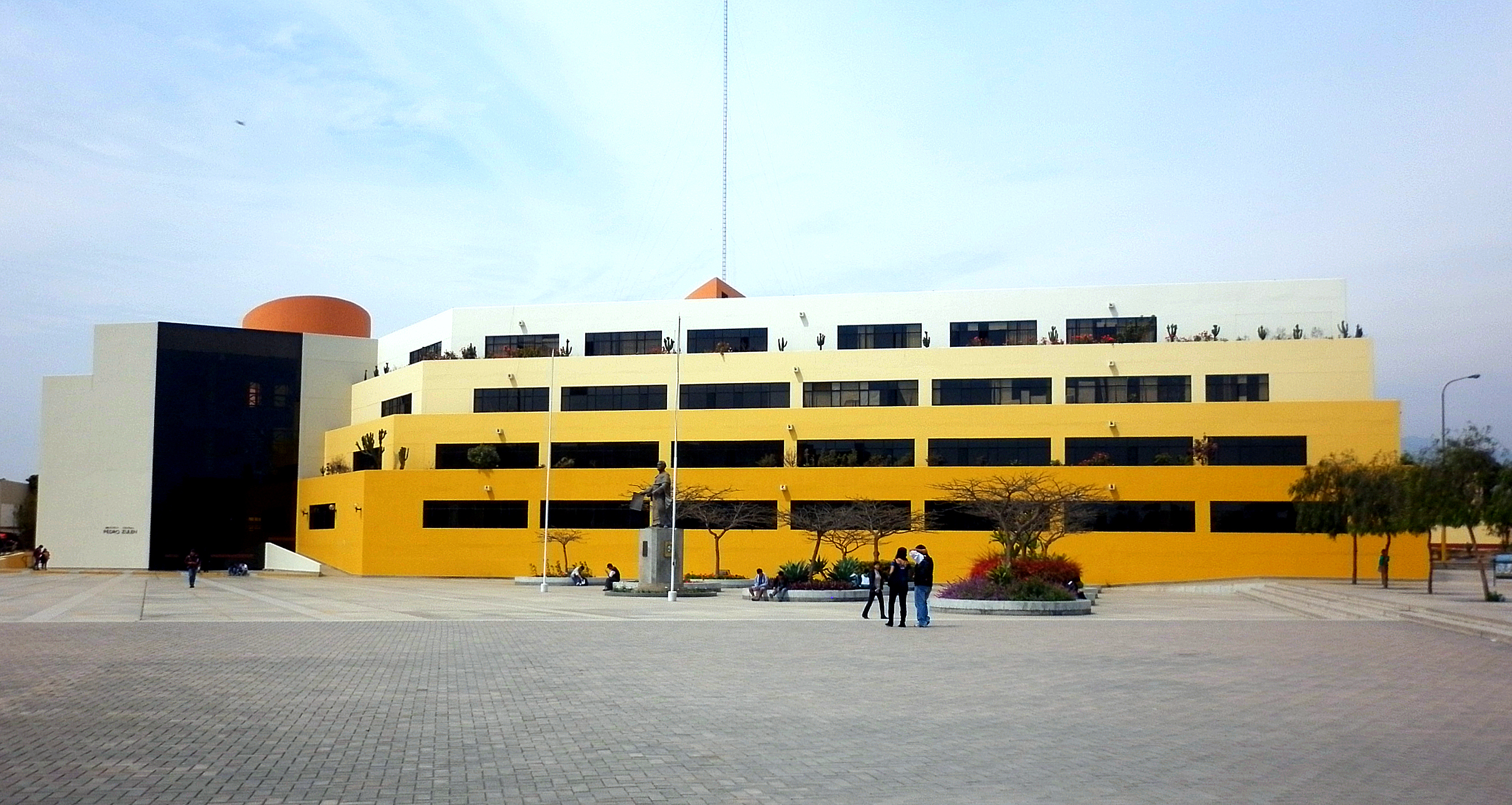
Exterior view of the Central Library

The "Pedro Zulen" Central Library of the university is a 19,800 m^{2} building. It has a multifunctional stage and 400 seats. The Central Library "Pedro Zulen", under the auspices of UNESCO, leads the initiative to develop digitalization of publications. The library directs the main activity of SISBIB. Each one of the faculties of the National University of San Marcos has its own library in the study areas of each faculty, these are connected to each other through the Library System (SISBIB) of the university.

==== Stadium of the University of San Marcos ====
The Stadium of the National University of San Marcos, officially known as the "Colossus of America", is located in the center of the University City. Its main accesses are through block 5 of Av. Amézaga and block 36 of Av. Venezuela. At the local level, it has been the official stadium of the university soccer team, Club Deportivo Universidad San Marcos, which played until 2011 in the Second Division of Peru.

It was inaugurated in 1951, commemorating the 400th anniversary of the founding of the University of San Marcos. The San Marcos stadium initially had a total capacity of 70,000 people. It has been conditioned to an official capacity of 32,000 people; the remodeled venue was for the 2019 South American U-17 Championship and the 2019 Pan American Games.

== Research ==
The University of San Marcos has 37 academic research units. They are classified mainly in the areas of: health sciences, basic sciences, engineering, economic and management sciences, and humanities and legal and social sciences. The research centers have museums and laboratories. Each institute also has its own publications. The university has around 500 research groups. Since 2015, the University of San Marcos has also had the Center for Technological, Biomedical and Environmental Research (CITBM). It is led by the University of San Marcos and is made up of three national companies and three international centers of excellence. Below is a list of the main research institutes of the University of San Marcos:

Health Sciences:
- FMSF: Clinical Research Institute
- FMSF: Center for Research in Biochemistry and Nutrition "Alberto Guzmán Barrón"
- FMSF: National Institute of Andean Biology
- FMSF: Pathology Research Institute
- FMSF: Institute of Tropical Medicine "Daniel A. Carrión"
- FMSF: Institute of Ethics in Health
- FMSF: Research Unit of the Faculty of Pharmacy and Biochemistry
- FFB: Research Institute of Pharmaceutical Sciences and Natural Resources "Juan de Dios Guevara"
- FFB: Institute for Research in Biological Chemistry, Microbiology and Biotechnology "Marco Antonio Garrido Malo"
- FFB: Latin American Center for Teaching and Research in Food Bacteriology
- FO: Stomatological Research Institute
- FMV: Veterinary Institute of Tropical and Altitude Research
- FPSI: Institute for Psychological Research
Basic Sciences:
- FCB: Research Institute of Biological Sciences
- FCF: Physics Research Institute
- FCM: Research Institute of Mathematical Sciences

Engineering:

- FQIQ: Research Unit of the Faculty of Chemistry and Chemical Engineering
- FQIQ: Institute of Chemical Sciences
- FQIQ: Institute of Chemical Engineering
- FIGMMG: Research Institute of Geological, Mining, Metallurgical, Geographical Engineering
- FII: Industrial Engineering Research Institute
- FIEE: Research Institute of Electrical and Electronic Engineering
- FISI: Research Institute of Systems Engineering and Informatics
Economics and Management Sciences:
- FCA: Research Institute of Administrative Sciences
- FCC: Research Institute of Financial and Accounting Sciences
- FCE: Research Institute of Economic Sciences

Humanities, and legal and social sciences:

- FLCH: Institute of Humanistic Research
- FLCH: Institute of Applied Linguistics
- FLCH: Research Institute of Peruvian and Latin American Thought
- FLCH: Institute for Linguistic Research
- FEDU: Educational Research Institute
- FDCP: Law and Political Science Research Unit
- FCS: Social Historical Research Institute

=== Production and scientific publications ===
According to the 2009 annual balance prepared by the National Council of Science, Technology and Technological Innovation (CONCYTEC) of Peru, 20% of Peruvian scientific production was generated by the National University of San Marcos. Several scientific publications of the University of San Marcos and its research institutes had appeared in Nature and Science. The main scientific publications of the University of San Marcos are published in academic journals Alma Máter and Theorema and in the 20 official magazines of each of the university's faculties. Each professional school also has its own academic journal.

Health Sciences:
- FMSF: Anales de la Facultad de Medicina
- FFB: Ciencia e Investigación
- FO: Odontología Sanmarquina
- FMV: Revista de Investigaciones Veterinarias del Perú
- FPSI: Revista de Investigación en Psicología

Basic Sciences:

- FQIQ: Revista Peruana de Química e Ingeniería Química
- FCB: Revista Peruana de Biología
- FCF: Revista de Investigación de Física
- FCM: Pesquimat
Engineering:
- FIGMMG: Revista del Instituto de Investigación de la Facultad de Minas, Metalurgia y Ciencias Geográficas
- FII: Industrial Data
- FIEE: Electrónica-UNMSM
- FISI: Revista de Investigación de Sistemas e Informática

Economics and management sciences:

- FCA: Gestión en el Tercer Milenio
- FCC: Quipukamayoc
- FCE: Pensamiento Crítico
Humanities and legal and social sciences:
- FLCH: Letras
- FLCH: Escritura y Pensamiento
- FEDU: Investigación Educacional
- FDCP: Docentia et Investigatio
- FCS: Investigaciones Sociales

=== University Press ===
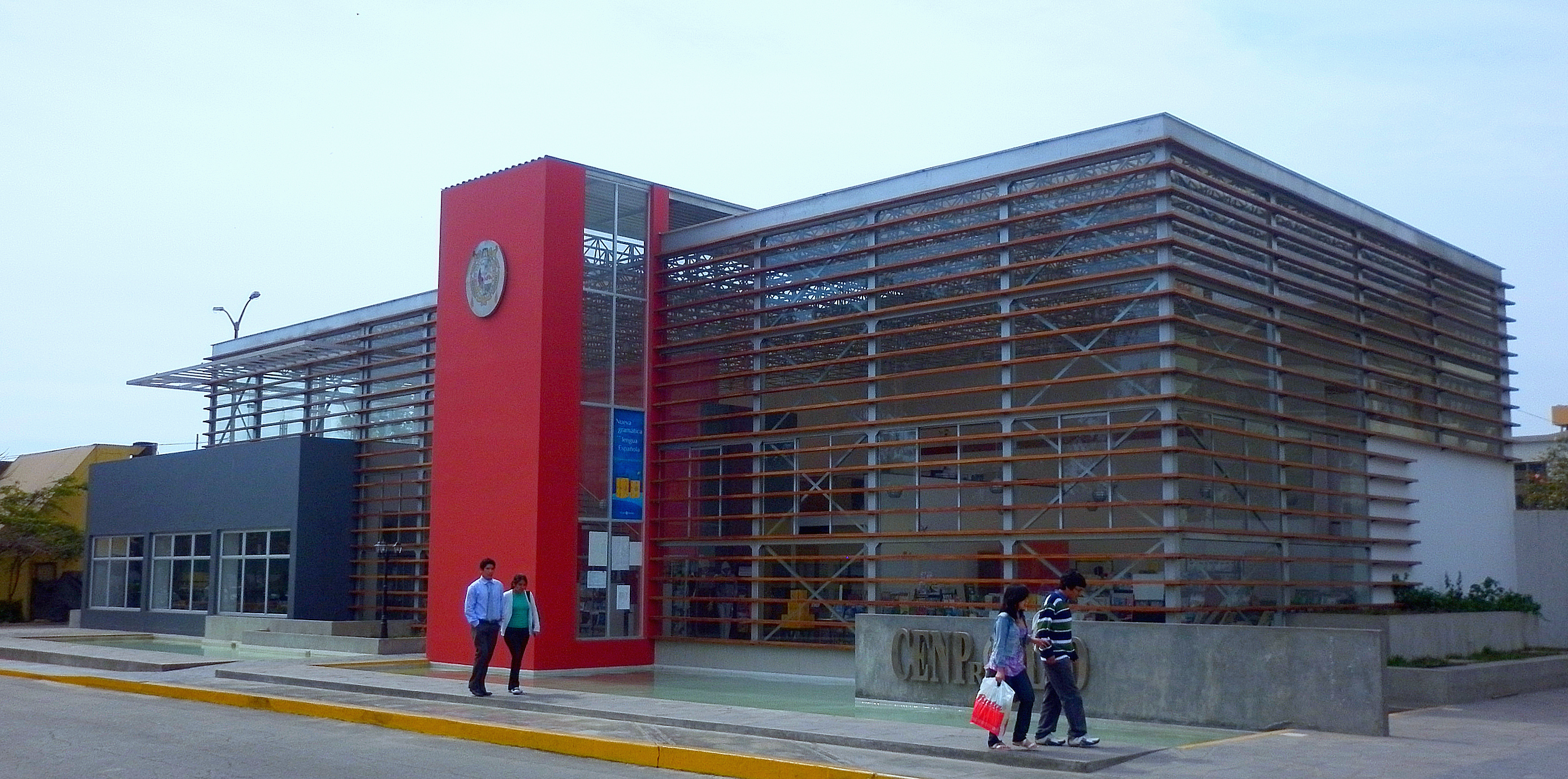
Bookstore of the university

The Editorial Fund of the University of San Marcos is the division in charge of publishing books, magazines, and newspapers. The publications are made both in the traditional printed format and via the Internet.

== Culture and heritage ==
=== Cultural centers ===
Currently, the National University of San Marcos has two cultural centers in two of its historic buildings. The Casona de San Marcos—its main cultural center—and the Colegio Real de San Marcos.

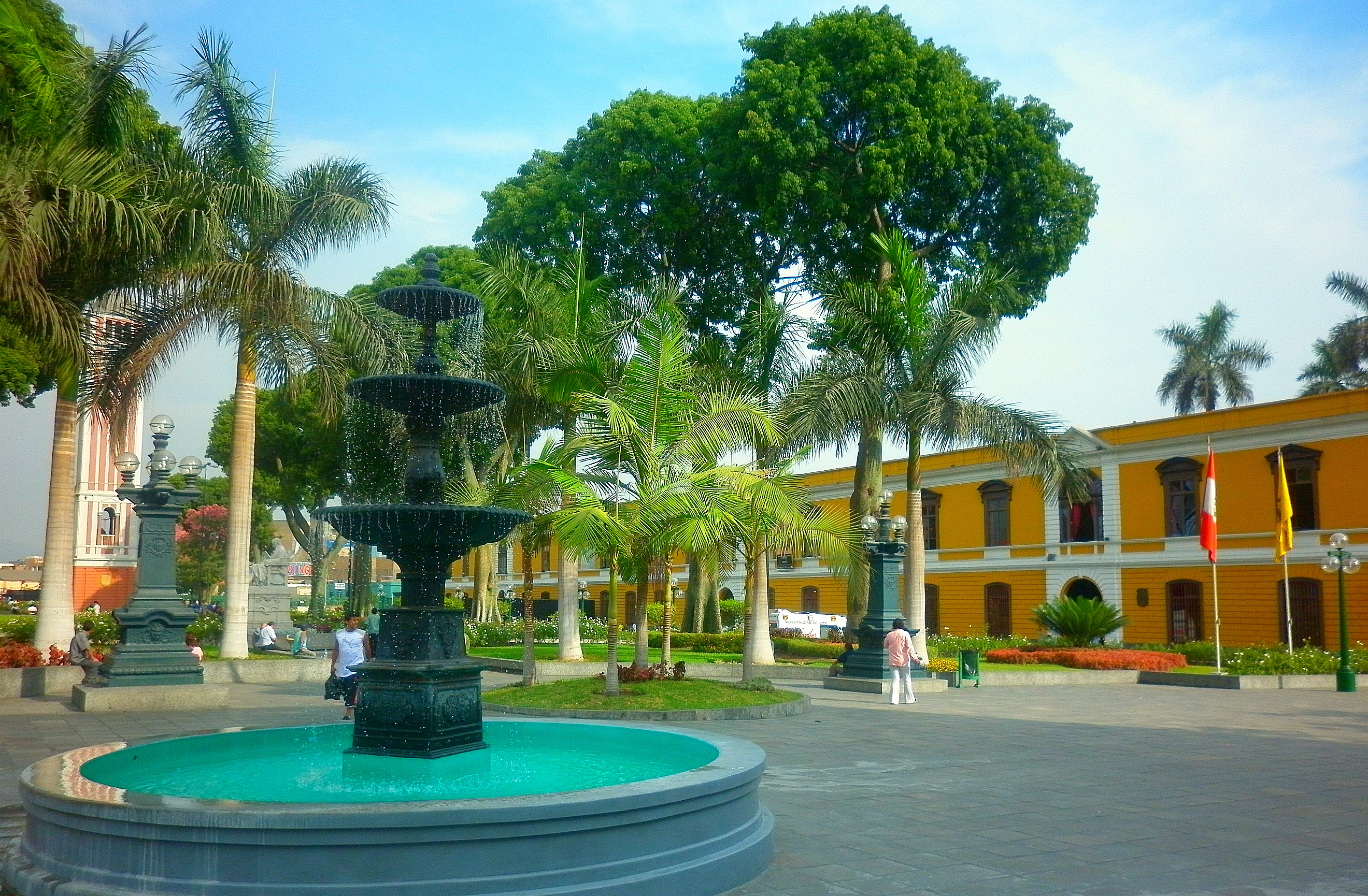
Exterior view of the Casona de San Marcos

The Cultural Center "La Casona" of San Marcos is one of the main tourist attractions of the Historic Center of Lima. The complex is part of the area and the list of buildings in the historic center of the capital that in 1988 was declared a World Heritage Site by UNESCO. In 1989, the National University of San Marcos, the Spanish Agency for International Cooperation (AECI) and the National Institute of Culture sign a Peru-Spain agreement to adapting its architectural complex for culture and artistic creation.

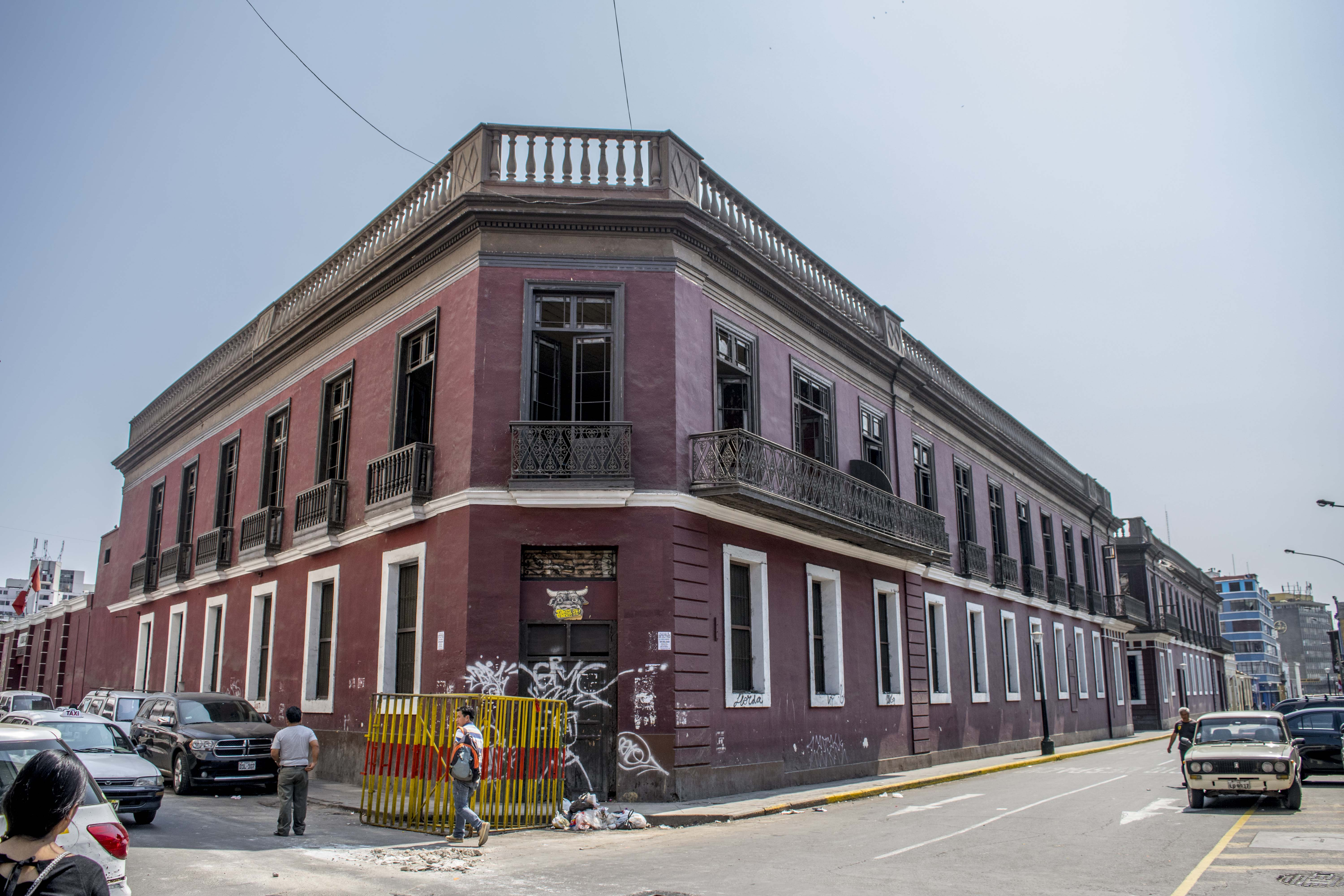
Exterior view of the Royal College

The Royal College Cultural Center of Contemporary Peruvian Cultures, established in 2006, is located in the environment of the old "Royal College" of San Marcos, next to the Congress of the Republic of Peru. It is made up of three units of the university: the Institute of Applied Linguistics CILA, the "Domingo Angulo" Historical Archive of the University of San Marcos, and the Andean Rural History Seminar. Exhibitions and shows are regularly held.

It was founded on the initiative of Viceroy Francisco Álvarez de Toledo in 1592. After the Bourbon Reforms that led to the expulsion of the Jesuits, the campus was recast as the Convictorio de San Carlos. At the end of the 18th century, the War Inspector Gabriel de Avilés y del Fierro dedicated the premises to the headquarters of the Royal Regiment of Lima. Since the end of the 20th century, the University of San Marcos has given the Royal College the functions of a Cultural Center and Historical Archive.

=== University museums ===
The University of San Marcos has institutions that function exclusively as museums, these are the Museum of Natural History of Lima, the Sacaco Paleontological Museum, the Museum of Art, the Museum of Archaeology, the Historical Museum of Physical Sciences, among others. The university also has four other specialized libraries.

=== Archaeological sites ===
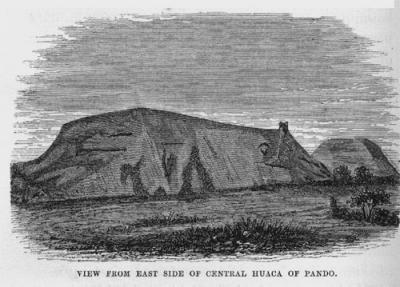
The Huaca de San Marcos. It is part of the Maranga complex

The National University of San Marcos has researched various archaeological sites and historical collections, such as the Huaca de San Marcos and others of the Maranga archaeological complex. In it, various ceramics have been found, as well as spondylus and quipus. The Ministry of Culture of Peru first declared the Huaca San Marcos and then all the minor archaeological sites on the campus, as Cultural Heritage of the Nation.

In 1966, Pablo Macera organized a trip to the Pacopampa archaeological site in Querocoto District; in 1970, he got Emilio Choy Ma to make a donation to San Marcos to acquire the Pacopampa Ceremonial Center.

== Notable people ==
Both formally and colloquially, the characters that have been part of the National University of San Marcos have received the title of sanmarquinos. The word has been in common use by the Peruvian population to refer to the close and prominent figures of this house of studies, and even to the pets and animals adopted by the university community.

== Athletics ==
On August 7, 1924, San Marcos students founded the University Sports Federation of Peru. Since 1936, this federation has organized the National University Sports Games, the Regional University Sports Games and the National University Championships. Since 1963, it has participated in the Universiade. The basketball team had participated in the Lima Basketball League.

The University of San Marcos has had various professional football teams, including the University Football Federation (Club Universitario de Deportes) that was founded in 1924 by students until it was separated from the university and became private due to problems with the authorities in 1932; and the Deportivo Universidad San Marcos that came to dispute the second division until 2012.

The first university Games were held in 1936 in the city of Lima. Since then, four years between each Games was marked, though, recently, they have been taking place every 2 years. In 1951, the Stadium of the University of San Marcos was inaugurated in the center of the main campus. For the celebration of the 2019 Pan American Games, the Organizing Committee of Lima 2019 chose various sports facilities located between the city of Lima, as well as in Callao, as Pan American venues. Among them, the National University of San Marcos had its stadium remodeled to host the event. The Stadium of the National University of San Marcos was the sole venue of the 2019 South American U-17 Championship that took place in Peru.

=== Origin of the Club Universitario de Deportes ===
José Rubio Galindo, a student at the Faculty of Letters, and Luis Málaga Arenas, a student at the Faculty of Medicine, would join Plácido Galindo, Eduardo Astengo, Rafael Quirós, Mario de las Casas, Alberto Denegri, Luis de Souza Ferreira (who scored the first Peruvian goal in a FIFA World Cup), Andrés Rotta, Carlos Galindo, Francisco Sabroso, Jorge Góngora, Pablo Pacheco, Carlos Lassus and Carlos Cillóniz, among others. On August 7, 1924, at 7:00 p.m. (UTC-5), university students met at the headquarters of the Federation of Students of Peru, at 106 Juan de la Coba street.

The National Sports Committee, the highest body of Peruvian sports at that time, recognized the Federación Universitaria as if it were a League. Hence, together with the Peruvian Football League, the Amateur Association, the Callao League, Circolo Sportivo Italiano and Lima Cricket and Football Club, they formed the Football Federation. After participating in inter-university tournaments between 1924 and 1927, the Peruvian Football Federation invited the Federación Universitaria to participate in the Selection and Competition Championship (First Division Tournament) of 1928.

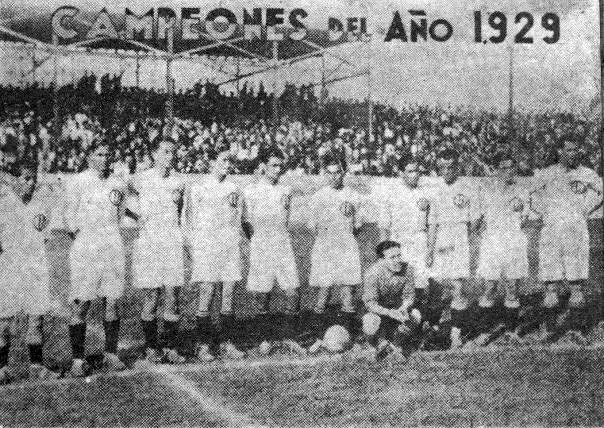
Federación Universitaria team

In the 1929 championship, the Federación Universitaria team of the University of San Marcos (today Club Universitario de Deportes) only had the participation of twelve teams due to the suspension of Alianza Lima for refusing to cede its players to the national team. The Federación Universitaria team still won the championship.

In 1930, the first FIFA World Cup was held in Montevideo, Uruguay. After the World Cup, the club traveled to the provinces by steamboat to face the Association White Star, which it defeated 1:0, then he toured Huacho and participated in the Gubbins Cup. The following year, the rector José Antonio Encinas prohibited the use of the name—Federación Universitaria de Fútbol—and this led to the change by Club Universitario de Deportes.

=== Club Deportivo San Marcos ===
In 2001, the University of San Marcos created the Club Deportivo Universidad Nacional Mayor de San Marcos, where it played until 2011. Club San Marcos played at the San Marcos stadium. The team was baptized with the name "The Lions" because the animal is the symbol of Mark the Evangelist. Later, the university created Deportivo San Marcos. The club has participated since 2013 in the first division of Cercado de Lima.

== See also ==
- Education in Peru
- List of universities in Peru
- List of colonial universities in Latin America
- Casona de la Universidad Nacional Mayor de San Marcos
- University City of the National University of San Marcos
- National School of Sciences and Arts of Cuzco, considered the oldest school in Peru
