= Romania at the FIFA World Cup =

International football delegation

This is a record of Romania's results at the FIFA World Cup. Romania has participated at 7 of 23 final tournaments of the World Cup. They were one of the few European participants at the inaugural edition held in Uruguay in 1930. The best performance of the team was in 1994 in the United States, when Romania reached quarter-finals after defeating Diego Maradona's Argentina. They eventually lost to Sweden after a penalty shoot-out. The last time Romania qualified was in 1998 in France, when they reached the round of 16, losing to Croatia. The team's top scorer at the World Cup is Florin Răducioiu, with 4 goals, all scored in 1994.

== Record at the FIFA World Cup ==
FIFA World Cup record
Year	Round	Position	Pld	W	D*	L	GF	GA
(Uruguay) 1930	Group stage	8th	2	1	0	1	3	5
(Italy) 1934	Round of 16	12th	1	0	0	1	1	2
(France) 1938	Round of 16	9th	2	0	1	1	4	5
(Brazil) 1950	Did not enter							
(Switzerland) 1954	Did not qualify							
(Sweden) 1958	Did not qualify							
(Chile) 1962	Withdrew							
(England) 1966	Did not qualify							
(Mexico) 1970	Group stage	11th	3	1	0	2	4	5
(West Germany) 1974	Did not qualify							
(Argentina) 1978	Did not qualify							
(Spain) 1982	Did not qualify							
(Mexico) 1986	Did not qualify							
(Italy) 1990	Round of 16	12th	4	1	2	1	4	3
(United States) 1994	Quarter-finals	6th	5	3	1	1	10	9
(France) 1998	Round of 16	11th	4	2	1	1	4	3
(South Korea) (Japan) 2002	Did not qualify							
(Germany) 2006	Did not qualify							
(South Africa) 2010	Did not qualify							
(Brazil) 2014	Did not qualify							
(Russia) 2018	Did not qualify							
(Qatar) 2022	Did not qualify							
(Canada) (Mexico) (United States) 2026	Did not qualify							
(Morocco) (Portugal) (Spain) 2030	To be determined							
(Saudi Arabia) 2034	To be determined							
Total	Quarter-finals	7/25	21	8	5	8	30	32

*Draws include knockout matches decided via penalty shoot-out

Romania's World Cup record
First match	Romania 3–1 Peru (14 July 1930; Montevideo, Uruguay)
Biggest win	Romania 3–1 Peru (14 July 1930; Montevideo, Uruguay); Romania 2–0 Soviet Union (9 June 1990; Bari, Italy); Romania 3–1 Colombia (18 June 1994; Pasadena, United States)
Biggest defeat	Uruguay 4–0 Romania (21 July 1930; Montevideo, Uruguay)
Best result	Quarter-finals in 1994
Worst result	Group stage in 1930, 1934, 1938 and 1970

=== By Match ===
World Cup	Round	Opponent	Score	Result	Venue	Scorers
1930	Group 3	Peru	3–1	W	Montevideo	A. Deșu, C. Stanciu, N. Kovács
1930	Group 3	Uruguay	0–4	L	Montevideo	—
1934	Round of 16	Czechoslovakia	1–2	L	Trieste	Ș. Dobay
1938	Round of 16	Cuba	3–3 (a.e.t.)	D	Toulouse	S. Bindea, I. Baratky, Ș. Dobay
1938	Round of 16	Cuba	1–2	L	Toulouse	Ș. Dobay
1970	Group 3	England	0–1	L	Guadalajara	—
1970	Group 3	Czechoslovakia	2–1	W	Guadalajara	A. Neagu, F. Dumitrache
1970	Group 3	Brazil	2–3	L	Guadalajara	F. Dumitrache, E. Dembrovschi
1990	Group B	Soviet Union	2–0	W	Bari	M. Lăcătuș (2)
1990	Group B	Cameroon	1–2	L	Bari	G. Balint
1990	Group B	Argentina	1–1	D	Naples	G. Balint
1990	Round of 16	Republic of Ireland	0–0 (a.e.t.) (4–5 pen.)	D	Genoa	—
1994	Group A	Colombia	3–1	W	Pasadena	F. Răducioiu (2), G. Hagi
1994	Group A	Switzerland	1–4	L	Pontiac	G. Hagi
1994	Group A	United States	1–0	W	Pasadena	D. Petrescu
1994	Round of 16	Argentina	3–2	W	Pasadena	I. Dumitrescu (2), G. Hagi
1994	Quarter-finals	Sweden	2–2 (a.e.t.) (4–5 pen.)	D	Stanford	F. Răducioiu (2)
1998	Group G	Colombia	1–0	W	Lyon	A. Ilie
1998	Group G	England	2–1	W	Toulouse	V. Moldovan, D. Petrescu
1998	Group G	Tunisia	1–1	D	Saint-Denis	V. Moldovan
1998	Round of 16	Croatia	0–1	L	Bordeaux	—

=== Record by Opponent ===
FIFA World Cup matches (by team)
Opponent	Wins	Draws	Losses	Total	Goals Scored	Goals Conceded
Argentina	1	1	0	2	4	3
Brazil	0	0	1	1	2	3
Cameroon	0	0	1	1	1	2
Colombia	2	0	0	2	4	1
Croatia	0	0	1	1	0	1
Cuba	0	1	1	2	4	5
Czechoslovakia	1	0	1	2	3	3
England	1	0	1	2	2	2
Peru	1	0	0	1	3	1
Republic of Ireland	0	1	0	1	0	0
Soviet Union	1	0	0	1	2	0
Sweden	0	1	0	1	2	2
Switzerland	0	0	1	1	1	4
Tunisia	0	1	0	1	1	1
United States	1	0	0	1	1	0
Uruguay	0	0	1	1	0	4

== Record players ==
Gheorghe Popescu and Gheorghe Hagi, Romania's top World Cup players, were team-mates at Steaua, Barcelona and Galatasaray. They became brothers-in-law when Hagi married Popescu's sister.

No.	Name	Matches	World Cups
1	Gheorghe Popescu	13	1990, 1994 and 1998
2	Gheorghe Hagi	12	1990, 1994 and 1998
3	Dorinel Munteanu	9	1994 and 1998
3	Dan Petrescu	9	1994 and 1998
5	Ilie Dumitrescu	8	1990, 1994 and 1998
5	Ionuţ Lupescu	8	1990 and 1994
7	Florin Răducioiu	7	1990 and 1994
8	Constantin Gâlcă	6	1994 and 1998
8	Bogdan Stelea	6	1994 and 1998
10	Marius Lăcătuș	5	1990 and 1998
10	Miodrag Belodedici	5	1994
10	Daniel Prodan	5	1994

== Top goalscorers ==
No.	Name	Goals	World Cups
1	Florin Răducioiu	4	1994
2	Ștefan Dobay	3	1934 (1) and 1938 (2)
2	Gheorghe Hagi	3	1994
4	Florea Dumitrache	2	1970
4	Gavril Balint	2	1990
4	Marius Lăcătuș	2	1990
4	Ilie Dumitrescu	2	1994
4	Dan Petrescu	2	1994 and 1998
4	Viorel Moldovan	2	1998
10	Eight players	1	

== See also ==
- Romania at the UEFA European Championship
