= Estadio Centenario =

Football stadium in Montevideo, Uruguay

Centenary Stadium
- Estadio Centenario
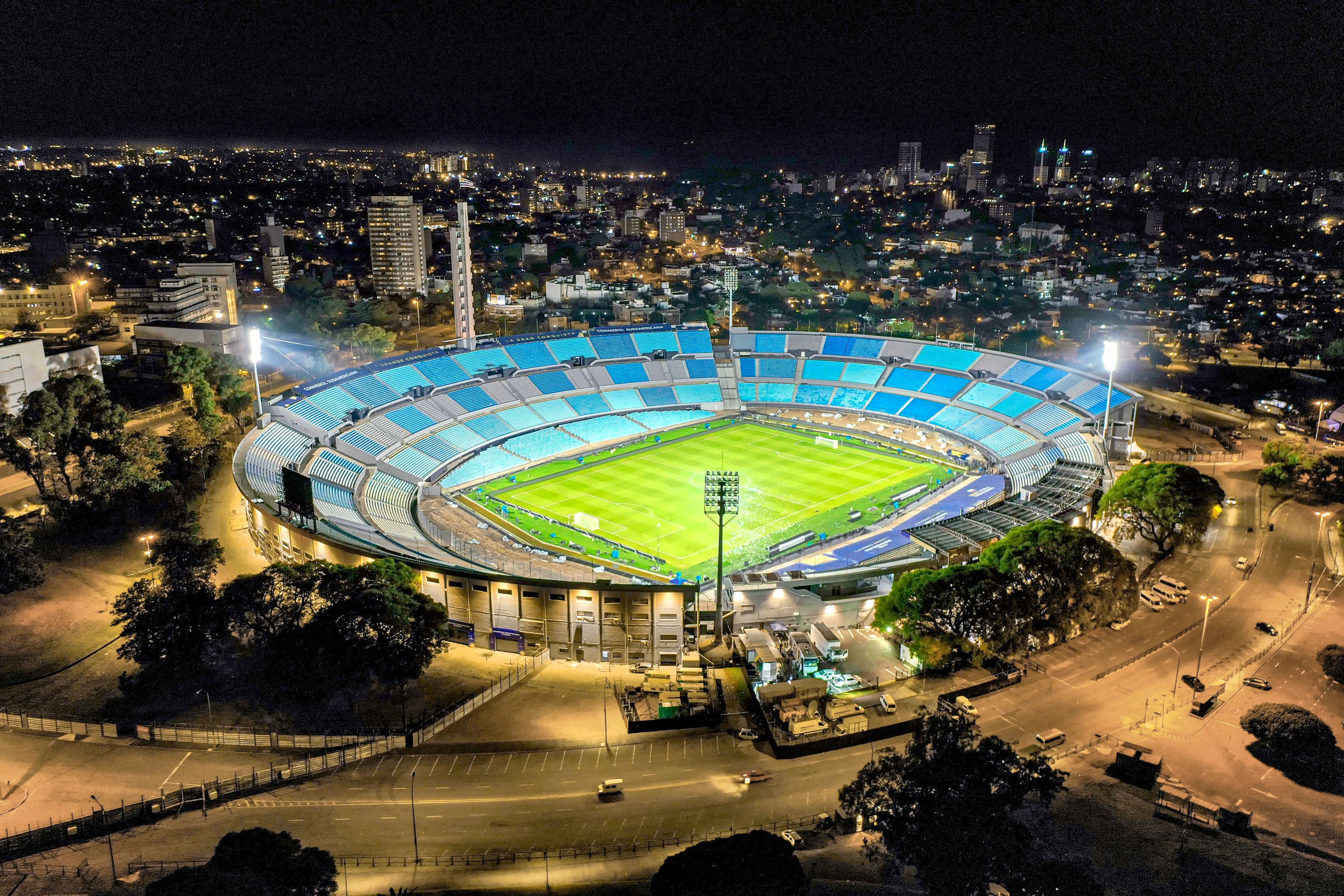
- Aerial view of the stadium in 2021
- Interactive map of Centenary Stadium
- Full name: Estadio Centenario
- Location: Avenida Dr. Américo Ricaldoni y Federico Videla, Parque Batlle, Montevideo, Uruguay
- Coordinates: 34°53′40.78″S 56°9′10.22″W
- Owner: Montevideo Department
- Operator: Comisión Administradora del Field Oficial (CAFO)
- Capacity: 60,235
- Surface: Grass
- Record attendance: 79,867; Uruguay–Yugoslavia (27 July 1930)
- Field size: 105 x 68 m

Construction
- Groundbreaking: 21 July 1929
- Built: 1929–30 (8 months)
- Opened: July 18, 1930
- Renovated: 2021
- Cost: $1,000,000
- Architect: Juan Antonio Scasso

Tenants
- Uruguay national football team (1930–present); Peñarol (1933–2016); Boston River (2026): Major sporting events hosted; 1930 FIFA World Cup; 1942 South American Championship; 1967 South American Championship; 1995 Copa América; 2021 Copa Libertadores final; 2026 Copa Libertadores final; 2030 FIFA World Cup

The Estadio Centenario (Spanish pronunciation: [estaðjo sentenaɾjo]; lit. 'Centenary Stadium', named after the centenary of Uruguay's Constitution) is an association football stadium in Montevideo, Uruguay. Located in the Parque Batlle neighbourhood, it is owned by the Montevideo Department.

The stadium was built between 1929 and 1930 to host the inaugural 1930 FIFA World Cup. It is listed by FIFA as one of the football world's classic stadiums. On 18 July 1983, it was declared by FIFA as the first Historical Monument of World Football, to this day the only building to achieve this recognition worldwide.

Estadio Centenario is the national stadium of Uruguay and the primary home of their national football team. Even the top-ranked Brazil national football team has only managed three wins in 20 attempts; two were official matches during 2010 and 2018 World Cup qualification, but one was Uruguay's heaviest defeat at the stadium when they lost 4–0 to Brazil in 2009.

== History ==
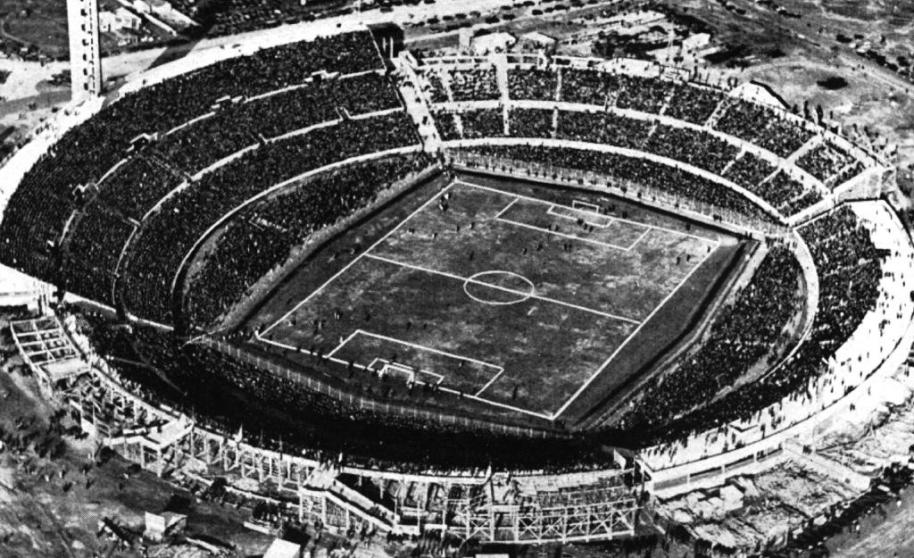
The stadium in 1930, when it was inaugurated for the first FIFA World Cup

The construction of the Centenario is one of the most important stages in the development of sports in South America and international football. It was built especially for the 1930 FIFA World Cup, by immigrant workers in a record time of nine months. Its name originates from the 100-year-celebration of the ratification of the first Constitution of Uruguay.

Initially, all World Cup matches were to be played in the Centenario. However, heavy rains in Montevideo delayed construction of the stadium, so that several matches had to be played in the Pocitos Stadium of C.A. Peñarol, and the Parque Central of Club Nacional de Football. It was inaugurated on 18 July 1930, with a match between Uruguay and Peru; the Celeste won 1–0 with a goal by Hector "Manco" Castro.

The final match of the inaugural World Cup matched Uruguay and Argentina, with Uruguay winning 4–2. Since then, the Centenario has been the scene of Copa América (1942, 1956, 1967, 1995), three South American Youth Championships (1979, 2003, 2015), a South American Under-17 Football Championship (1999) and 1980 Mundialito.

In 2021, the Centenario was selected as host of the Copa Libertadores and Copa Sudamericana finals. The stadium was renovated to prepare for those matches. The total cost of the works was $6 million and included the renovation of the grandstands, bathrooms, VIP boxes, and press boxes, along with a new illumination system and new pitch.

== Tenants ==
Aside from the Uruguay national team, any football club can rent the stadium for its home matches. Peñarol has done that often, and Nacional rents it for some international matches. Peñarol played all of its home matches at the stadium from 1933 until it moved to Estadio Campeón del Siglo in 2016.

In the case of other Uruguayan teams, they often decide to play there against both Peñarol and Nacional.

== Grandstands ==
Video of the stadium prior to a game against Brazil in June 2009

The stadium has four grandstands separated by four lanes. The main one is the Olympic Tribune (and lower Platea known as Olympic), which is named so because the team had won two Olympic championships in a row (1924 and 1928). This has a maximum capacity of 21,648 spectators located in the three rings and the audience. Then there are the "popular", so called because they are sold cheaper, these are: the Colombes, in honor of the Colombes, France in which the national team became Olympic champions 1924 and Amsterdam, because it was where the Celeste were crowned Olympic champions for the second time in 1928. The Grandstand Colombes accommodates 13,914 spectators while the Amsterdam accommodates 13,923. The America Tribune is parallel to the Olympic one. There are also "VIP" boxes and press boxes with room for 1,882 spectators, as well as the platform has room for 2,911 spectators, and additionally the grandstand has room for 5,957 people.

Under the Olympic Grandstand are located primary school "Nº 100 Héctor Fígoli"; and the Museum of Uruguayan Football. Under the Colombes Grandstand is located Police Station Nº9.

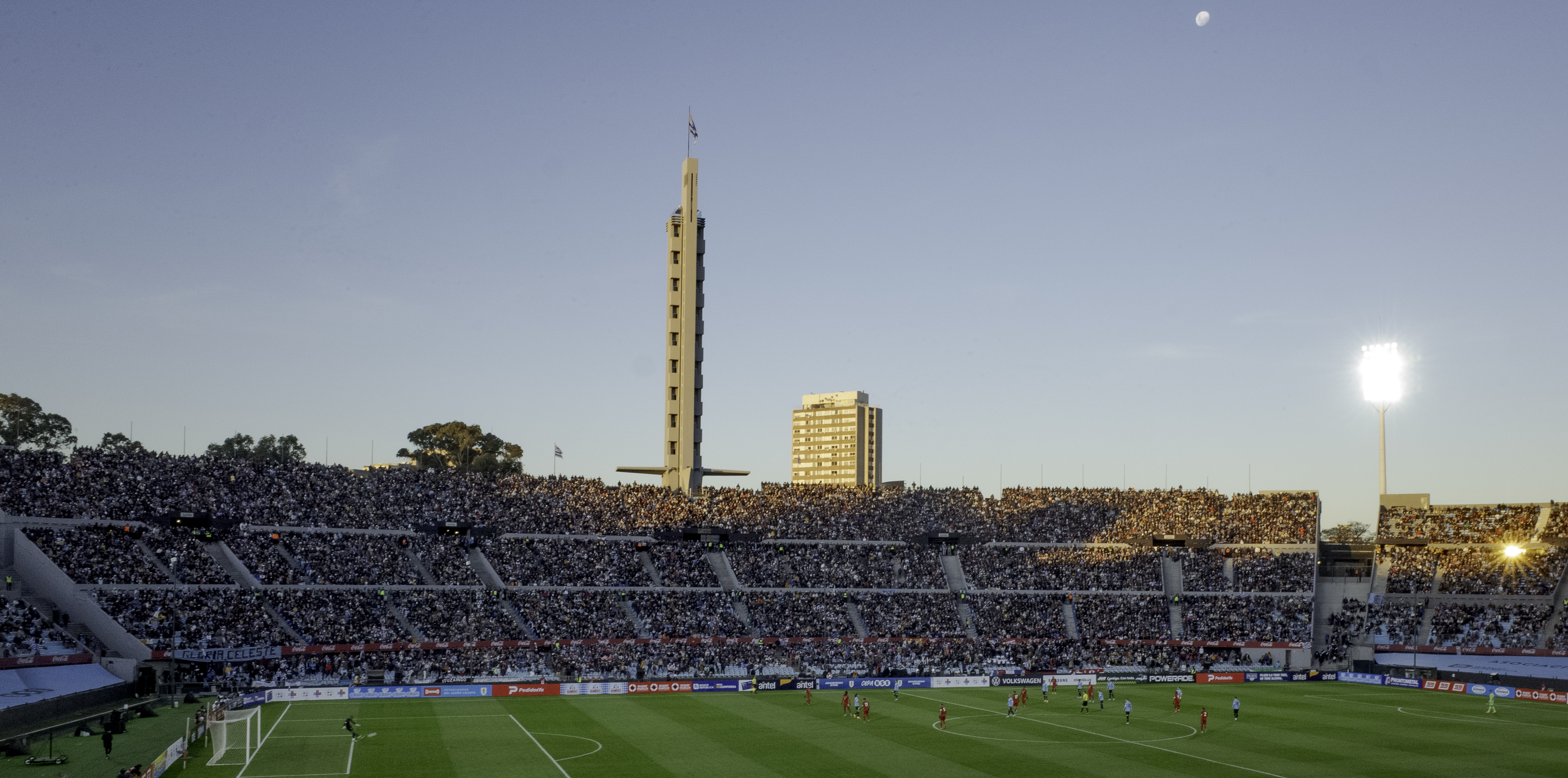
Estadio Centenario, panorama of the Olympic grandstand in 2022.

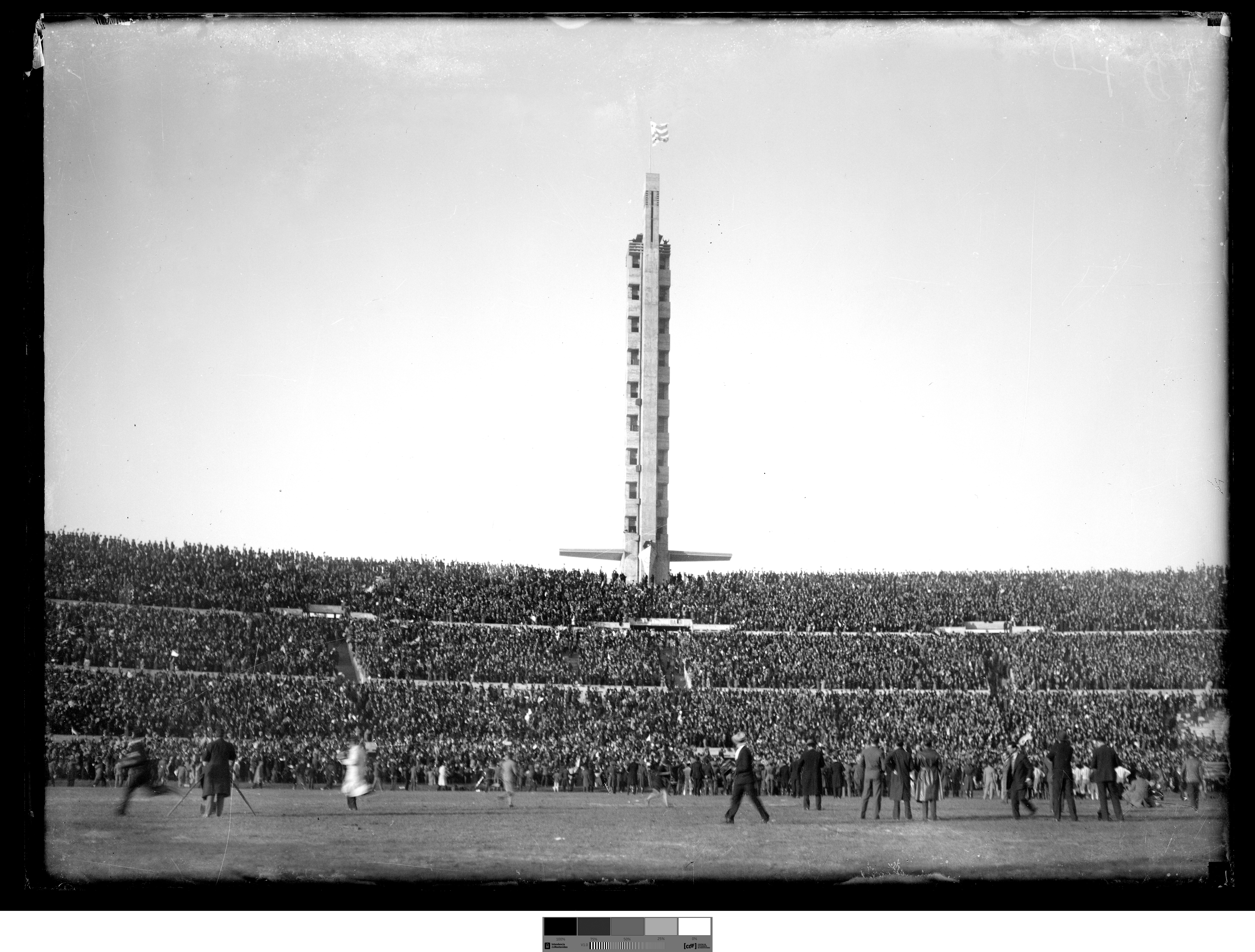
The stadium at the 1930 World Cup Final.

=== Other facilities ===
Inside the Centenario stadium, there are other facilities such as the "Uruguayan Football Museum" which highlights the sporting achievements of the Uruguayan national team. It is located under the Olympic grandstand of the Centenario stadium and was inaugurated on 15 December 1975. In 2004, it underwent a remodeling, in which a panoramic elevator was added to the Torre de los Homenajes.

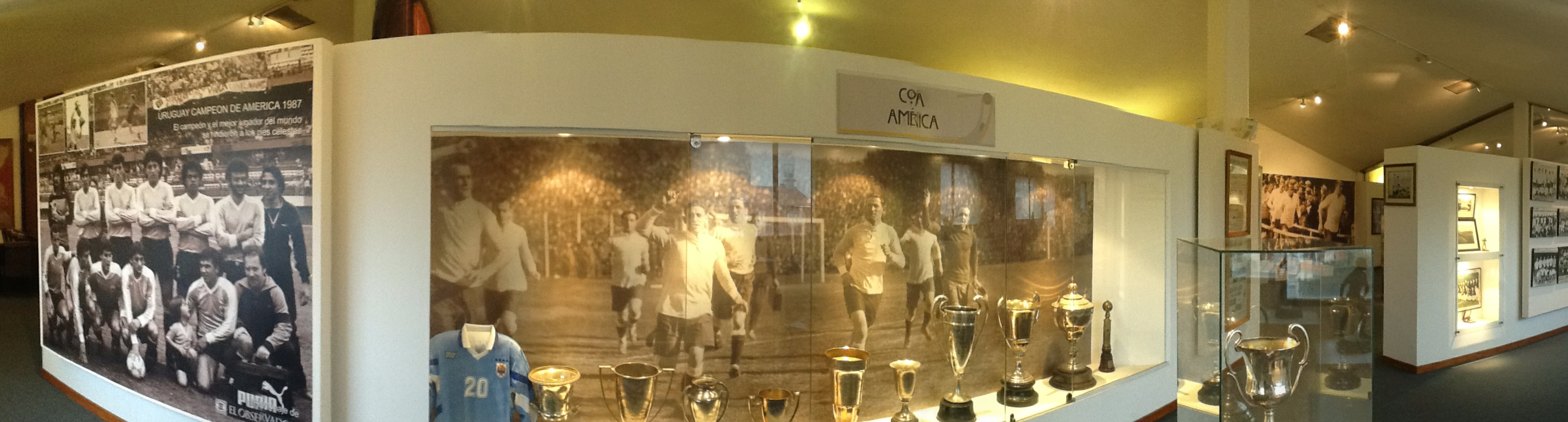
Trophies and memorabilia exhibited at the Museum

The Museum has a large collection of objects that are reminders of the most outstanding moments of Uruguayan and world football.

This is administered by the Official Field Administrative Commission (CAFO), which is made up of representatives of the AUF and the Montevideo Municipal Government. On 21 July 1929, the founding stone of the Stadium was laid, which is located under the tower and can also be visited. Estadio Centenario is equipped to accommodate visitors with Disability. The stadium features wheelchair-accessible seating areas, elevators, and ramps. Additionally, dedicated restroom facilities and amenities are available for disabled spectators.

There is also a school running under the Olympic grandstand.

== Sporting events ==
=== 1930 FIFA World Cup ===
Estadio Centenario hosted ten matches of the 1930 FIFA World Cup, including both semi-final matches and the final match.

| Date | Time | Team No. 1 | Result | Team No. 2 | Round | Attendance |
|---|---|---|---|---|---|---|
| 18 July 1930 | 14:30 | Uruguay | 1–0 | Peru | Group 3 | 57,735 |
| 19 July 1930 | 12:50 | Chile | 1–0 | France | Group 1 | 2,000 |
| 19 July 1930 | 15:00 | Argentina | 6–3 | Mexico | Group 1 | 42,100 |
| 20 July 1930 | 13:00 | Brazil | 4–0 | Bolivia | Group 2 | 25,466 |
| 20 July 1930 | 15:00 | Paraguay | 1–0 | Belgium | Group 4 | 12,000 |
| 21 July 1930 | 14:50 | Uruguay | 4–0 | Romania | Group 3 | 70,022 |
| 22 July 1930 | 14:45 | Argentina | 3–1 | Chile | Group 1 | 41,459 |
| 26 July 1930 | 14:45 | Argentina | 6–1 | United States | Semi-final | 72,886 |
| 27 July 1930 | 14:45 | Uruguay | 6–1 | Yugoslavia | Semi-final | 79,867 |
| 30 July 1930 | 14:15 | Uruguay | 4–2 | Argentina | Final | 68,346 |

=== Copa Libertadores and Copa Sudamericana Final ===
The stadium hosted the final of the Copa Sudamericana on 20 November 2021, the Copa Libertadores on 27 November 2021, and will host the final of the 2026 Copa Libertadores.

=== 2030 FIFA World Cup ===
On 4 October 2023, Uruguay was announced as one of six host nations for the 2030 FIFA World Cup. To celebrate the centennial of the inaugural World Cup, Estadio Centenario is expected to host the opening match.

== Concerts ==
The stadium has held numerous concerts by both national and international artists such as:

- Aerosmith
- Amaral
- Árbol
- Arnaldo Antunes
- Attaque 77
- Brian May
- Bryan Adams
- Buitres Después de la Una
- Charly García
- Chayanne
- Enrique Iglesias
- Eric Clapton
- Fito Páez
- Guns N' Roses
- Joaquín Sabina
- Joe Cocker
- Joe Vasconcellos
- Jorge Drexler
- Los Olimareños
- Los Piojos
- Luciano Pavarotti
- Luis Miguel
- Maná
- No Te Va Gustar
- Nortec Collective
- One Direction
- Patricio Rey y sus Redonditos de Ricota
- Paul McCartney
- Phil Collins
- Plácido Domingo
- ReyToro
- Ricardo Arjona
- Rod Stewart
- Roger Waters
- Roxette
- Rubén Blades
- Sebastian Bach
- Serú Girán
- Shakira
- Soledad Pastorutti
- Soy Luna en Concierto
- Sting
- Sui Generis
- The Rolling Stones
- Tini
- Teen Angels
- The Cult
- Van Halen

== See also ==
- List of football stadiums in Uruguay
- Lists of stadiums

Events and tenants
| Preceded by None | FIFA World Cup; Opening Venue; 1930 | Succeeded by All 8 venues used for the 1934 FIFA World Cup, matches on the first day were all played at the same time |
| Preceded by None | FIFA World Cup; Final Venue; 1930 | Succeeded by Stadio del PNF; Rome |
| Preceded by Estadio Nacional de Chile; Santiago | South American Championship; Final Venue; 1942 | Succeeded by Estadio Nacional de Chile; Santiago |
| Preceded by Estadio Monumental Isidro Romero Carbo; Guayaquil | Copa América; Final Venue; 1995 | Succeeded by Estadio Hernando Siles; La Paz |
| Preceded by Estadio Mario Alberto Kempes; Córdoba | Copa Sudamericana; Final Venue; 2021 | Succeeded by Estádio Nacional Mané Garrincha; Brasília |
| Preceded by Maracanã; Rio de Janeiro | Copa Libertadores; Final Venue; 2021 | Succeeded by Estadio Monumental Isidro Romero Carbo; Guayaquil |
