= Alberto Soria =

Peruvian footballer (1906–1980)

Personal information
- Full name: Alberto Soria Ortega
- Date of birth: 10 March 1906
- Place of birth: Peru
- Date of death: 23 June 1980 (aged 74)
- Height: 1.68 m (5 ft 6 in)
- Position: Defender

Senior career*
Years	Team	Apps	(Gls)
–1924	Teniente Ruiz		
1924–1933	Alianza Lima		
1933–1939	Universitario		

International career
1930–1937	Peru	6	(0)
- * Club domestic league appearances and goals

Alberto Soria Ortega (10 March 1906 – 23 June 1980) was a Peruvian football defender who played for Peru in the 1930 FIFA World Cup.

== Club career ==
Nicknamed el Doctor, he was the first major player who left Alianza Lima for eternal rivals Universitario de Deportes in 1933.

== International career ==
Soria earned six caps for Peru between 1930 and 1937.
