= Adalbert Deșu =

Romanian footballer

Béla Dezső / Adalbert Deşu
Personal information
- Full name: Béla Dezső / Adalbert Deșu
- Date of birth: 24 March 1909
- Place of birth: Gátalja, Austria-Hungary (now Gătaia, Romania)
- Date of death: 6 June 1937 (aged 28)
- Place of death: Timișoara, Romania
- Height: 1.70 m (5 ft 7 in)
- Position: Inside left

Senior career*
Years	Team	Apps	(Gls)
1928–1930	UDR Reşiţa	52	(34)
1930–1933	Banatul Timișoara	77	(42)
Total		129	(76)

International career
1929–1930	Romania	6	(3)
- * Club domestic league appearances and goals

Adalbert Deșu (Hungarian: Béla Dezső, Hungarian pronunciation: [ˈbeːlɒ ˈdɛʒøː]; 24 March 1909 – 6 June 1937) was a Romanian football striker. He was a member of Romania national football team which competed at the 1930 FIFA World Cup in Uruguay. Deșu was also the first scorer for Romania at a FIFA World Cup. He scored a goal in the first minute of his team's first group game of the first football world cup.

== Career ==
Deșu, of Hungarian origin, was born in Gátalja (Gătaia) and started his football career in his hometown. After a while he moved to Reşiţa, playing for two years at UDR. In 1929, he was called up to the Romania national football team for the first time, scoring in a friendly against Bulgaria. He was also picked up for the Romanian team which competed in 1930 FIFA World Cup. The chairman of the club where he played, Wolfgang Auschnit, refused to pay him the salary in the period of the World Cup. After the World Cup, Deșu eventually left the club because of the chairman. Deșu scored Romania's first goal against Peru, and played his last match for the national team in the second match of that World Cup for Romania, against Uruguay. After the World Cup, he signed with Banatul Timișoara, but in 1933 he retired from football because of pneumonia. In 1937, he died of pneumonia, aged 28.

== International goals ==
Romania's goal tally first

#	Date	Venue	Opponent	Score	Result	Competition
1.	15 September 1929	Levski Field, Sofia, Bulgaria	Bulgaria	3–2	3–2	Friendly
2.	4 May 1930	Red Star Stadium, Belgrade, Yugoslavia	Yugoslavia	1–2	1–2	Friendly
3.	14 July 1930	Estadio Pocitos, Montevideo, Uruguay	Peru	1–0	3–1	1930 FIFA World Cup

== References and notes ==
Sporting positions
Preceded by Lucien Laurent	Fastest World Cup Goalscorer; 50 seconds 14 July 1930 – 7 June 1934	Succeeded by Ernst Lehner
