= José María Lavalle =

Peruvian footballer (1911–1984)

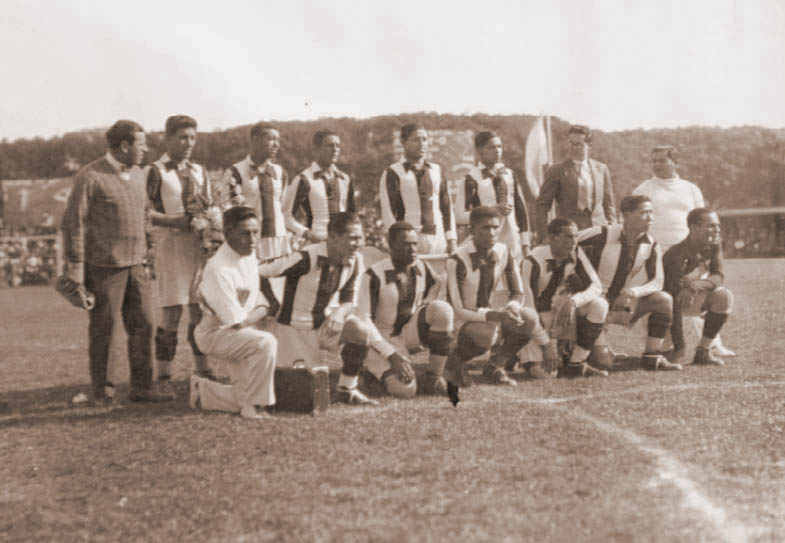
- Peru Football team 1927

Personal information
- Full name: José María Lavalle Covarrubias
- Date of birth: 21 April 1902
- Place of birth: Lima, Peru
- Date of death: 7 July 1984 (aged 82)
- Place of death: Peru
- Position: Forward

Senior career*
Years	Team	Apps	(Gls)
- Alianza Lima

International career
1927–1937	Peru	11	(0)
- * Club domestic league appearances and goals

José María Lavalle Covarrubias (21 April 1902 – 7 July 1984) was a Peruvian football forward who played for Peru in the 1930 FIFA World Cup. He also played for Alianza Lima.

== International career ==
He earned a total of 11 caps for Peru, scoring no goals.
