= Domingo García (footballer) =

Peruvian footballer (1904-1986)

Personal information
- Full name: Domingo García Heredia
- Date of birth: 30 November 1904
- Place of birth: Peru
- Date of death: 19 December 1986 (aged 82)
- Height: 1.62 m (5 ft 4 in)
- Position: Midfielder

Senior career*
Years	Team	Apps	(Gls)
- Alianza Lima

International career
- Peru
- * Club domestic league appearances and goals

Domingo García Heredia (born 30 November 1904 - 19 December 1986 ) was a Peruvian football midfielder who played for Peru in the 1930 FIFA World Cup. He also played for Alianza Lima.
