= Alberto Denegri =

Peruvian footballer (1906-1973)

Personal information
- Full name: Alberto Luis Denegri Aspauza
- Date of birth: 7 August 1906
- Place of birth: Lima, Peru
- Date of death: 18 May 1973 (aged 66)
- Position: Midfielder

Senior career*
Years	Team	Apps	(Gls)
- Universitario de Deportes

International career
- Peru
- * Club domestic league appearances and goals

Alberto Luis Denegri Aspauza (7 August 1906 – 18 May 1973) was a Peruvian footballer who played as a midfielder for Peru in the 1930 FIFA World Cup. He also played for Universitario de Deportes.
