= Luis de Souza =

Peruvian footballer (1908-2008)

Personal information
- Full name: Luis Emilio de Souza Ferreira Huby
- Date of birth: October 6, 1908
- Place of birth: Lima, Peru
- Date of death: September 29, 2008 (aged 99)
- Place of death: La Punta, Peru
- Height: 1.78 m (5 ft 10 in)
- Position: Forward

Youth career
- Universitario

Senior career*
Years	Team	Apps	(Gls)
1926–1934	Universitario		

International career
1929–1934	Peru	2	(4)
- * Club domestic league appearances and goals

Luis Emilio de Souza Ferreira Huby (October 6, 1908, in Lima – September 29, 2008, in La Punta) was a football forward player from Peru who played for Universitario de Deportes.

== Club career ==
Souza studied engineering and made his professional debut with Universitario de Deportes in 1926. He remained with the club during his 8 years as a professional footballer.

== International career ==
He played for the Peru National Team from 1929 to 1934. In 1930 he represented his country in the 1930 FIFA World Cup finals in Uruguay. In this competition he scored the first-ever Peruvian World Cup goal.

=== International goals ===
Peru's goal tally first

#	Date	Venue	Opponent	Score	Result	Competition
1.	14 July 1930	Estadio Pocitos, Montevideo, Uruguay	Romania	1–1	1–3	1930 FIFA World Cup

== Personal life ==
=== Death ===
Don Lucho died September 2008, only a few days short of his 100th birthday.

== See also ==
- One-club man
