= Mario de las Casas =

Peruvian footballer (1901–2002)

Personal information
- Full name: Mario de las Casas Ramírez
- Date of birth: 31 January 1901
- Place of birth: Lima, Peru
- Date of death: 10 October 2002 (aged 101)
- Place of death: Callao, Peru
- Position: Defender

International career
Years	Team	Apps	(Gls)
- Peru

Mario de las Casas Ramírez (31 January 1901 – 10 October 2002) was a Peruvian football defender who played for Peru in the 1930 FIFA World Cup and the 1935 Campeonato Sudamericano.
