= Arab Woman of the Year Award =

Arab Women of the Year Awards

The Arab Women of the Year Awards were created in 2015 and are organized by the London Arabia Organisation with support from the Mayor of London and Regent's University London. They are now an annual event, hosted by London Arabia Organisation as well as partners and supporters. The advisory board of the London Arabia Organisation includes Fawaz bin Mohammed Al Khalifa, Hugh Robertson, Nusrat Ghani, Jeremy Purvis, Khawla Armouti, and various Arab corporate leaders. In 2022, HRH The Countess of Wessex, now the Duchess of Edinburgh, attended.

The Awards do not have set categories, to ensure the women are selected purely on merit, rather than their background or chosen field. Multiple awards are given each year in a wide range of categories and over fifty women have now been awarded.

Year	Award	Honoree	Areas of Work	Ref
2025	Achievement in Transformational Leadership	Dr Manar Al Moneef		
2025	Achievement in Educational Development	Haifa Dia Al-Attia		
2025	Achievement in Educational Leadership	Dr Sonia Ben Jaafar		
2025	Achievement in Science	Dr Najat Mokhtar		
2025	Achievement in Social Development	Nahla Haidar El Addal		
2025	Achievement in Social Impact	Her Highness Sayyida Meyyan bint Shihab		
2025	Achievement in Preserving Cultural Heritage	Sheikha Bibi Al-Sabah		
2024	Achievement in Humanitarian Aid	Tanya Haj-Hassan		
2024	Achievement in Cyber Security Education	Dr Noora Fetais		
2024	Achievement in Social Development	Khuloud Hassan Al Nuwais		
2024	Achievement in Cultural Exchange	Farrah El Dibany		
2024	Achievement in Creativity	Shaikha Noor bint Rashid AlKhalifa		
2024	Achievement in Cultural Pioneering	Her Highness Princess Noura bint Faisal Al Saud		
2024	Achievement in Business Leadership	Shirine Khoury-Haq	CEO of the Co-Op Group	
2023	Achievement in Community Services	Her Royal Highness Shaikha Fatima bint Hazza Al Nayhan		
2023	Achievement in Education	Dr Shaikha May Al Otaibi	Founder of the Bahrain Bayan School	
2023	Achievement in Diplomacy	Her Excellency Dr Najla Mangoush		
2023	Achievement in Media Freedom	Her Excellency Dr May Chidiac		
2023	Achievement in Community Services	Her Excellency Khawla Al-Armouti		
2023	Achievement in Scientific Development	Prof Manahel Thabet		
2023	Achievement in Social Impact	Nour Arida		
2023	Achievement in Innovation	Dr Nada AlShammari		
2023	Community Spirit Award	Dima Aktaa		
2022	Achievement in Community Service	Mama Maggie		
2022	Achievement in Media	Caroline Faraj	Vice President and Editor in Chief, CNN Arabic	
2022	Achievement in Financial Services	Sheikha Alanoud Al-Thani		
2022	Achievement in Business	Areej Mohsin Darwish		
2022	Achievement in Social Leadership	HE Shaikha Rana AlKhalifa		
2022	Achievement in Social Awareness	Nada Alahdal	Activist	
2022	Youth Achievement in Environmental Impact	Fatema Al Zelzela	Founder of EcoStar	
2019	Achievement in Global Gender Equality	HE Najat Vallaud-Belkacem		
2019	Achievement in Economic Development & Leadership	H.E. Mariam AlAqeel		
2019	Achievement in Television	Raya Abirached	TV presenter	
2019	Achievement in Family Support	HE Rym Abdulla Al Falasy		
2019	Achievement in Sport	Ons Jabeur	Tennis player	
2019	Achievement in Special Needs Education	HH Dania Al Saud		
2019	Achievement in Business	Lujaina Darwish		
2019	Achievement in Journalism	Ahdeya Ahmed		
2019	Achievement in Cultural Exchange	Ayoub Sisters	Musical duo	
2019	Achievement in Social Impact	Rana Husseini		
2019	Campaign for Social Change	Abolish Article 153		
2018	Achievement in Global Leadership in Cancer Control	Dina Mired	leadership of cancer-fighting organizations	
2018	Achievement in Business	Khalida Azbane Belkady	executive for a cosmetics and perfume company	
2018	Achievement in Television	Lojain Omran	television presenter	
2018	Youth Achievement Award	Bana Al-Abed	anti-war activist and author	
2018	Achievement in Health Awareness	Dr Naeema Hassan Al-Gasseer	leadership in public health, for WHO and national ministries	
2018	Achievement in Social Development	Dr Sharifa Al-Yahyai	Women's rights advocate	
2018	Achievement in Sport	Sarah Essam	Premier league footballer	
2018	Achievement in Media	Baria Alamuddin	Political journalist	
2018	Achievement in Literature	Intisar Al-Aqeel		
2018	Lifetime Achievement Award	Souad Abdullah	Actor	
2017	Achievement in Philanthropy	Lamia Bint Majid al-Saud	Leadership of philanthropic organizations related to anti-poverty, disaster relief, and the advancement of women and children	
2017	Achievement in Community Development	Intisar Al-Sabah	Founder of the community-building organization Alnowair	
2017	Achievement in Social Leadership	Dr Hania Mursi Fadl	Founder of a regional breast cancer center	
2017	Achievement in Music	Nawal El-Kuwaitia	Performer of popular traditional music	
2017	Achievement in Culture	Dr Maha El-Khalil Chalabi	Social entrepreneur	
2017	Achievement in Promoting Women's Advancement	Yasmine Sabri	Activist, actress, athlete	
2017	Achievement in Motivation and Wellbeing	Hala Kazim	Author and motivational speaker	
2017	Achievement in Trade Development	Hind Bint Salman Al-Khalifa	Business development	
2017	Achievement in Education	Dr Karma Nabulsi	Author and academic	
2017	Achievement in Journalism	Raghida Dergham	Political journalist	
2017	Achievement in Public Awareness	Hind Al-Eryani	Anti-war, women's rights, and public health activist	
2016	Achievement in Social Leadership	Ameera al-Taweel		
2016	Lifetime Achievement Award	Souad al-Sabah		
2016	Achievement in Business	Salwa Idrissi Akhannouch		
2016	Community Awareness	Sawsan al-Sha'er		
2016	Young Education Activist	Muzoon Almellehan		
2016	Achievement in International Law	Taghreed Hikmat		
2016	Achievement in Science	Dr. Ismahane Elouafi		
2016	Achievement in Sport	Hassiba Boulmerka		
2016	TV Presenter Award	Eman Ayad		
2016	Special Award	Ameera Binkara		
2016	Achievement in Art	Jannat Aljumily		
2015	Achievement in Culture and Education	Mai al-Khalifa		
2015	Achievement in Music	Majida El Roumi		
2015	Achievement in Social Leadership	Ahlam Mosteghanemi		
2015	Achievement in Cinema	Yousra		
2015	Achievement in Business	Aisha Hussein Alfardan		
2015	Achievement in Community Service	Nouf bint Faisal al-Saud		
2015	Achievement in Science	Hissah Saad al-Sabah		
2015	Achievement in Sports	Habiba Ghribi		
2015	Achievement in Science	Merieme Chadid		
2015	Young TV Presenter Award	Ola Al-Fares		
2015	Achievement in Media	Somayya Jabarti	Reporter	

== See also ==
- List of awards honoring women
