= Streptomyces youssoufiensis =

Streptomyces youssoufiensi

Scientific classification
- Domain: Bacteria
- Kingdom: Bacillati
- Phylum: Actinomycetota
- Class: Actinomycetia
- Order: Streptomycetales
- Family: Streptomycetaceae
- Genus: Streptomyces
- Species: S. youssoufiensi

Binomial name
- Streptomyces youssoufiensi Hamdali et al. 2011

Type strain
- CCMM B709, DSM 41920, X4

Species of bacterium

Streptomyces youssoufiensi is a bacterium species from the genus of Streptomyces which has been isolated from a phosphate mine in Youssoufia in Morocco.

== See also ==
- List of Streptomyces species
