= Misr University =

Misr University may refer to:

- Misr International University, an undergraduate private university located in the suburbs of Cairo, Egypt
- Misr University for Science and Technology, a private university located in 6th of October City, Giza, Egypt
