= Alanoud bint Hamad Al Thani =

Qatari royal and business executive

Sheikha Alanoud bint Hamad Al Thani
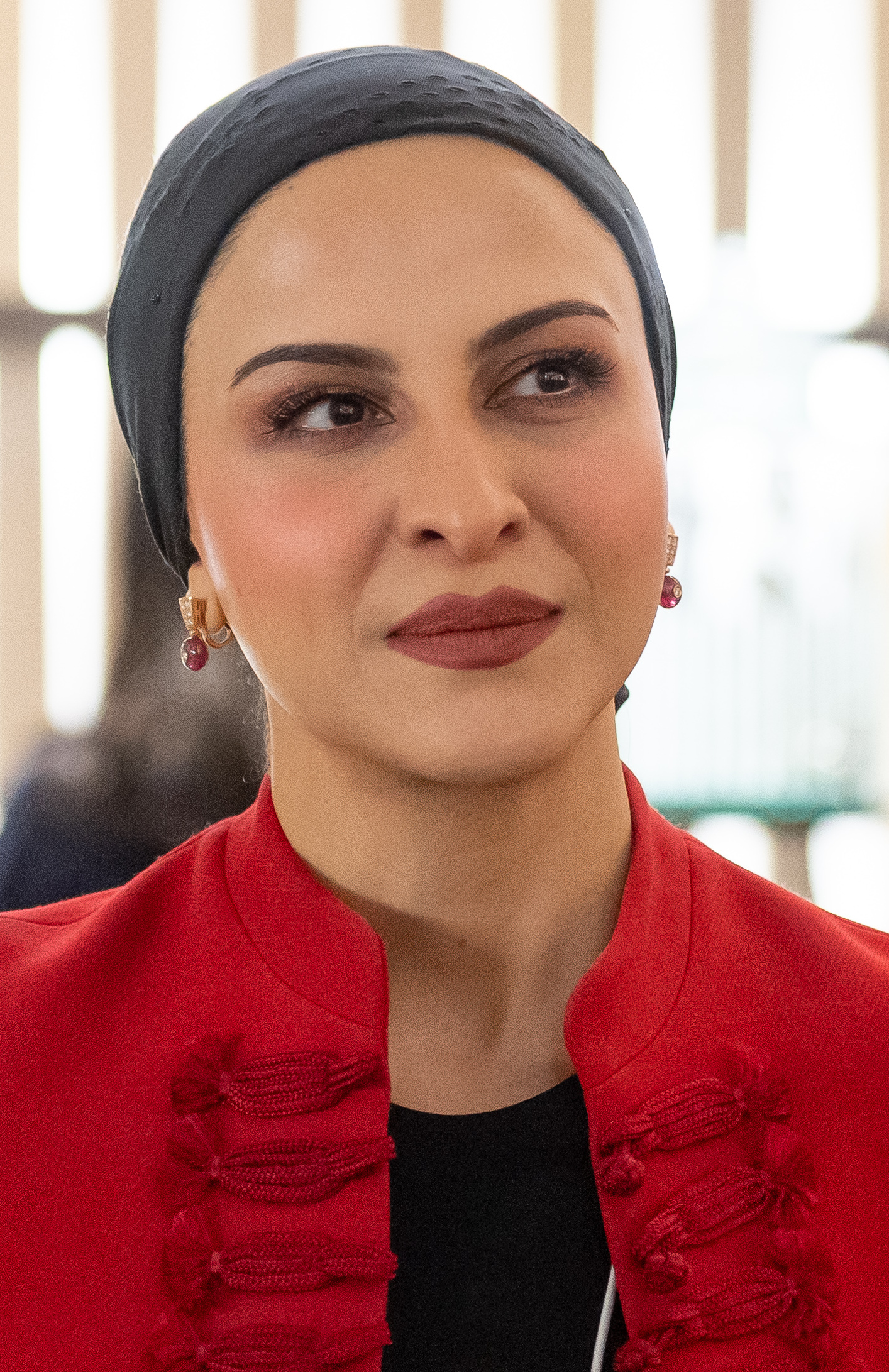
- Sheikha Alanoud at the World Economic Forum in 2023.
Names
- Alanoud bint Hamad Al Thani
- House: Thani
- Occupation: businesswoman
- Education: London School of Economics; University of Oxford

Sheikha Alanoud bint Hamad Al Thani (Arabic: العنود بنت حمد آل ثاني) is a Qatari businesswoman. She serves on the board of directors of the Qatar Financial Centre and was appointed as the centre's chief business officer and deputy chief executive officer in 2023. Prior to her appointment, she served as managing director of business development at the centre, launching initiatives to promote employment throughout the COVID-19 pandemic in Qatar. Sheikha Alanoud was the first woman and youngest person to be appointed to the centre's executive committee. In March 2021, she was named a Young Global Leader by the World Economic Forum. In 2022, she was a recipient of the Arab Woman of the Year Award and was named by Forbes as one of the 50 Most Powerful Businesswomen in the Middle East and North Africa.

== Early life and education ==
Sheikha Alanoud is a member of the House of Thani. She is a great-grandniece of Sheikh Jassim bin Mohammed Al Thani, the founder of Qatar.

She attended the London School of Economics, University of Oxford, and HEC Paris, and has an executive education degree from the Qatar Leadership Centre Rising Leaders Program.

== Career ==
Sheikha Alanoud began working at the Qatar Financial Centre in 2016. She first served as Vice President of Strategic Alliances at the chief executive officer's Office and, soon after, was appointed as associate director of Economic Affairs for the Middle East and North Africa. In 2017, she was appointed managing director of Business Development, serving in that capacity throughout the COVID-19 pandemic in Qatar. During her tenure, she worked to improve employment and job security in Qatar. In 2023, Sheikha Alanoud was appointed Chief Business Officer and Deputy Chief Executive Officer of the Qatar Financial Centre, heading the Business Development and Client Affairs departments. She is the first woman, and youngest person, to serve on the centre's executive committee.

Sheikha Alanoud formerly served as the Qatar Country Director for Silatech, a social initiative that provides employment opportunities for young people throughout the Arab World.

In March 2021, Sheikha Alanoud was selected as a Young Global Leader by the World Economic Forum, making her the youngest Young Global Leader and the only Qatari to receive the award that year. She was also named a Global Shaper by the Forum.

== Awards ==
Sheikha Alanoud is a two time recipient of His Highness Sheikh Tamim bin Hamad Al-Thani Education Excellence Award, receiving the award in 2008 and 2012. In 2011, she was a recipient of the Young Arab Achiever award. In 2022, Forbes recognized her as one of the Middle East's 50 Most Powerful Businesswomen in MENA. In 2022, she was awarded the Arab Woman of the Year Award for achievements in financial services.
