= Misr International University =

Private research institution

- جامعة مصر الدولية
- Misr International University logo
- Other name: MIU
- Type: Private
- Established: 1996
- Chairman: Mohamed El Rashidy
- President: Porf. Mahassen Farghaly (acting)
- Location: Obour City, Qalyubiyya Governorate; 30.167°N 31.492°E
- Campus: 14.4 acres (5.8 ha); Urban
- Language: English
- Colors: Red
- Website: miuegypt.edu.eg

Misr International University (MIU) (Arabic: جامعة مصر الدولية) is a private research university in Obour, Qalyubiyya Governorate, Egypt.

== History ==
Misr International University, was founded in the year 1996 in accordance with the presidential decree no. 246. It was founded with the purpose of developing an academic institution that would address the practical realities of the 21st century. The university has been a member of the Association of Arab Universities since March 1997.

== Faculties ==
- Faculty of Al-Alsun and Mass Communication
- Faculty of Business Administration and International Trade
- Faculty of Computer Science
- Faculty of Engineering Sciences & Arts
- Faculty of Oral and Dental Medicine
- Faculty of Pharmacy

== Notable alumni ==
- Lamia bint Majed Al Saud - Secretary General of Alwaleed Philanthropies

== See also ==
- List of universities in Egypt
