= Karma Nabulsi =

British professor of politics at Oxford

Karma Nabulsi is a Tutor and Fellow in Politics at St Edmund Hall at the University of Oxford, and the Library Fellow. Her research is on 18th and 19th century political thought, the laws of war, and the contemporary history and politics of Palestinian refugees and representation.

== Career ==
Nabulsi read for her master's degree and doctorate at Balliol College, Oxford. She was an Open Prize Research Fellow in Politics at Nuffield College (1998–2005). She was the Jean Monnet Fellow in History at the European University Institute (2000–2001).

Nabulsi's research spans 18th and 19th century political thought, the laws of war, and the contemporary history and politics of Palestinian refugees, representation, and democracy.

While Research Fellow at Nuffield College, Nabulsi directed a civic needs assessment for Palestinian refugees and was editor of its findings, Palestinians Register: Laying Foundations and Setting Directions (2006). From 2011 to 2016, she convened and directed a civic voter registration for Palestinian refugees to their national parliament in over 24 countries, working with the UN, the UNHCR, and UNRWA, and national and international central elections commissions. The project created a secure online voting mechanism, designed with colleagues at Oxford, which is used by international institutions who serve the needs of refugees.

She directed a digital humanities programme sponsored by the British Academy, developed with scholars, museums, research institutes, and universities across the Global South. Published in 2017, it provides a bilingual open-access research and teaching resource. The online course and research materials cover the Palestinian liberation movement during the anti-colonial era of the 1950s, 60s, and 70s.

She has written in the British press on the Palestinian experience and the British Government's 'Prevent' counter-terrorism strategy.

She was previously the director of undergraduate studies at the department of politics and international relations in Oxford. She is Equalities Officer of the UCU branch at the University of Oxford.

== Awards ==
In 2016, Nabulsi won the Oxford University Student Union ‘Special Recognition Award’. In 2017, Nabulsi won the Guardian Higher Education Inspiring Leader award, and the ‘Arab Woman of the Year’ Award in Education. In 2019, she won the Middle East Studies Association (MESA) ‘Undergraduate Education Award’.

== Selected works in English ==
- Exiled from Revolution, in Seeking Palestine: New Palestinian Writing on Exile and Home, eds. Johnson and Shehadeh, Interlink Press, 2013
- That the General Will Is Indestructible in Self-Evident Truths? Human Rights and the Enlightenment, The Oxford Amnesty Lectures, ed., Tunstall, Kate E. New York, Bloomsbury Academic. 2012
- The Role of Palestinian Intellectuals, in Waiting for the Barbarians: A Tribute to Edward Said, Sokmen and Ertur (eds.), Verso, 2008.
- Traditions of Justice in War: The Modern Debate in Historical Perspective, in Stathis N. Kalyvas, Ian Shapiro, and Tarek Masoud (eds.) Order, Conflict, and Violence, Cambridge University Press, 2008.
- Justice as the Way Forward in Where Now for Palestine? The Demise of the Two State Solution, Muwatin (the Palestinian Institute for the Study of Democracy), Zed Press, 2007.
- The Conception of Justice in War: from Grotius to Modern Times, in R. Sorabji and D. Rodin (eds), The Ethics of War: Shared Problems in Different Traditions, Aldershot: Ashgate, 2006.
- Traditions of War: Occupation, Resistance, and the Law, Oxford University Press, 2005 (paperback edition).
- The Statebuilding Process: What Went Wrong?, in M. Keating, A. Le More and R. Lowe (eds), Aid, Diplomacy and Facts on the Ground: The Case of Palestine, London: Chatham House, 2005.
- La Guerre Sainte: Debates about Just War amongst Republicans in the Nineteenth Century, in S. Hazareesingh (ed), The Jacobin Tradition in Modern France: Essays in Honour of Vincent Wright, Oxford: Oxford University Press, 2003.
- Evolving Conceptions of Civilians and Belligerents: One Hundred Years after the Hague Peace Conferences, in S. Chesterman (ed), Civilians in War, London: Lynne Rienner, 2001.
- Just War, Leve en Masse, and Jus ad Bellum Jus in Bello in Roy Gutman and David Rieff, eds., Crimes of War. New York, W.W. Norton, 1999.
