= Hind Al-Eryani =

Yemini activist and journalist

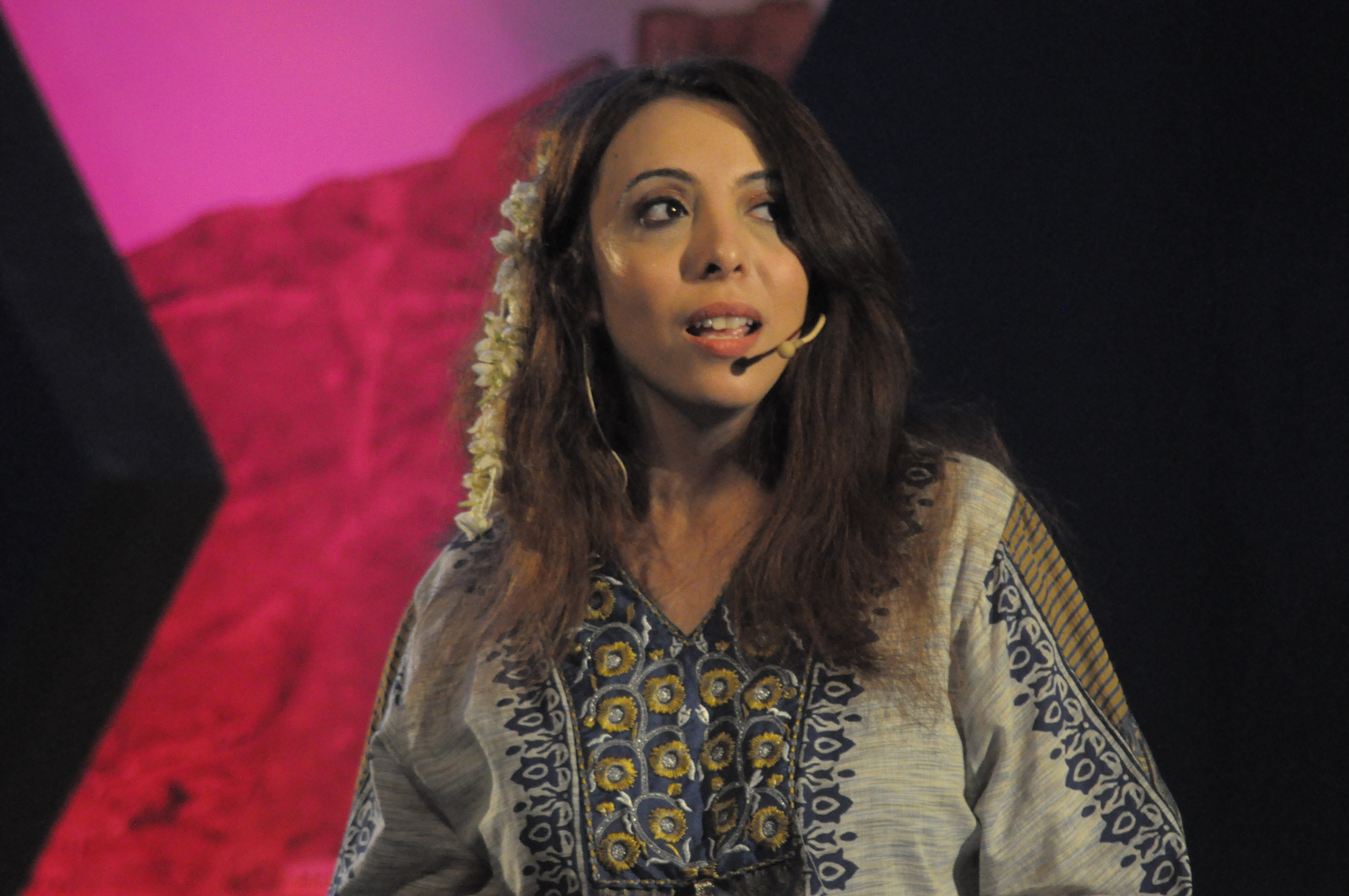
- Hind Al-Eryani at her TEDx Talk
- Born: Jibla
- Education: Computer science degree and master's in business administration
- Occupations: Activist and journalist
- Awards: Arab Woman of the Year Award

Hind Al-Eryani (Arabic: هند الإرياني) is a Yemeni activist and journalist. She advocates for women's rights, LGBTQ+ including gender minorities, and peace in Yemen, and has written many articles in support of the topics. She has also fought against khat, a drug-like substance.

Hind actively participated in multiple campaigns and fought against numerous causes. She helped for the release of the Baha'is minority in Yemen. She also confronted an eight-year-old child's rapist in Turkey. Moreover, she also opposed a Reuter's reporter urging for his removal.

In 2017, she won the Arab Woman of the Year Award for Achievement in Public Awareness.

Her journalism caused her to have to seek asylum from Turkey to Sweden. She also encountered multiple challenges with her refugee status in Sweden after she was obliged to move from Turkey due to death threats. Her advocacy ensued controversies and oppositions which endangered hers and her daughter's well-being. She also received criticism in defending the LGBTQ community in the Arab world.

Hind studied both in Yemen and Lebanon and has a degree in Computer science from Sana'a University and a master's in business administration from the American University of Science and Technology. She is also currently a member of the UN Women's Yemeni Women Pact for Peace & Security.

== Early life and education ==
Jibla was a town in Yemen that had a Muslim queen ruler and it is where Hind Al-Eryani was born. The fact that it was the only town that had a woman as ruler inspired Hind's mindset on feminism and women empowerment. Hind pursued her studies first in Yemen and then in Lebanon, where her father held the title of a diplomat at the Yemeni embassy of Beirut. In Yemen, she majored in computer science at Sana's University and then she furthered her education by completing a master's in business administration at the American University for Science and Technology.

The activist got married at twenty years old; however, her marriage ended in a divorce in 2005 because of the abuse she experienced from her husband which led to an unhappy marriage. The family parted ways after her father died, as they chose different countries to reside in. Hind decided to travel to Turkey, while her sister and mother moved to Sweden. One of the reasons she chose to live in Turkey was because of its flexibility in allowing her to participate in campaigns in which she was part of, however she then encountered problems in Turkey which obliged her to move to Sweden with her daughter.

== Campaigns and achievements ==
=== Peace in Yemen ===
In 2016, Hind advocated for peace in Yemen by leading a campaign for this matter. The talks around the campaign happened in Kuwait due to the country's endorsement for Yemeni people and it was named "Do not return without peace". Despite the campaign receiving attention from Yemeni people across the world, the politicians did not contribute to the same support. In result, the Kuwait talks fell short.

=== Release of the six individuals ===
In 2020, Hind started her attempt to liberate the six individuals who were held captive by the Houthis rebels in Yemen. In order to secure the release, she worked with UN special envoy Martin Griffiths and Houthis leaders.

=== Shame on Reuters ===
Hind led a campaign called "Shame on Reuters" in aim of a more objective news coverage. She called for the removal of the Reuter's reporter named "Mohammed Saddam" after discovering his association with the government. Therefore, she initiated the campaign after discovering that the journalist was the personal reporter and translator of former President Ali Abdullah Saleh. Moreover, the activist tried to ensure not to reveal her identity in interviews and kept a low profile while participating in the campaign due to her contribution with the UN and her obligation to keep a neutral political attitude.

=== Against Khat ===
Khat is a drug that is highly used by the people in Yemen. The drug has many negative consequences on the economy, water and agriculture. Therefore, Hind led a campaign in which effectively reached a large audience, to fight against its consumption. She confronted the Yemeni parliament in taking necessary actions and pushed them to adopt a strategy that she proposed. Despite the strategy being rejected by the parliament, since some politicians were involved in investing in lands that grew Khat, with the help of the national dialogue it was approved and included it in the draft of the new constitution 2015.

=== Defending LGBTQ in the Arab world ===
Hind wrote articles on homosexuality and defended it as she contradicts the automatic judgments associated with it. She is one of the first Arab activists to talk about the matter and managed to get the UN to write on the Yemeni LGBTQ community. She talks about the abuse and injustices that the community faces and how dangerous it is to be part of the community not only in Yemen but in Arab countries generally, defending their rights as human being and emphasizing on the fact that being part of the community is not a violation. The activist responds to the accusations on her sexuality and emphasizes on the fact that it is not a negative accusation, yet a regular claim. She questions the intentions of Arab societies in not treating the community like others and highlights the normality of being homosexual.

=== Achievements ===
In 2017, she won the Arab Woman of the Year Award for Achievement in Public Awareness. On Thursday, November 30 the activist was awarded by the Regent’s University London on behalf of the London Arabia Organization, with the collaboration of the Mayor of London during a grand ceremony.

== Challenges and criticism ==
Hind Al-Eryani's advocacy resulted into menaces from opposers in Turkey which obliged her to travel elsewhere due to the lack of safety for her. She travelled to Sweden with her daughter where they both received a residency there. The threats began when she opposed an influential sheikh for defending a child's rapist. This provoked her decision to move from Turkey, for her safety and the safety of her daughter as the threats were deteriorating. Hind encountered challenges in Sweden as she also felt unsafe there. She and her daughter encountered issues with receiving the asylum.

Hind faced cyber critiques for defending the LGBTQ community and advocating for their rights in Arab countries, especially after the release of her article on homosexuality.
