= Naeema al-Gasseer =

Bahreini former WHO official

- نعيمة القصير
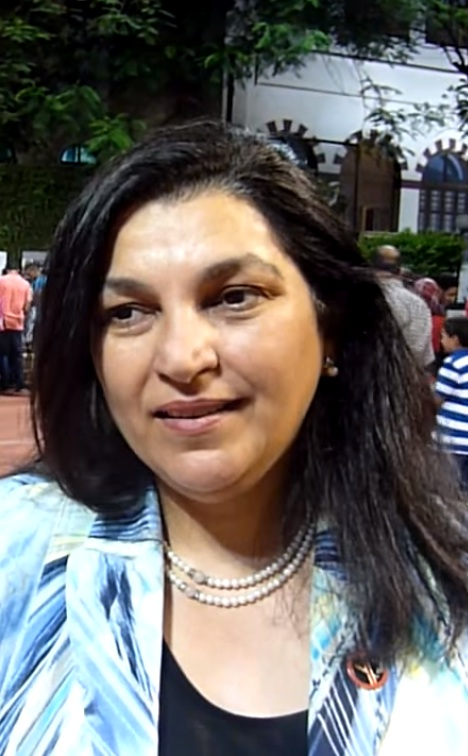
- Naeema Al-Gasseer speaking at the Science Lantern panel Cairo, 18 August 2011
- Born: Manama, Bahrain
- Education: American University of Beirut, University of Illinois at Chicago
- Occupation: World Health Organization official
- Years active: 1990-2023
- Known for: achievements in public health and women's health

Naeema al-Gasseer (Arabic: نعيمة القصير, born in Manama, Bahrain) is a nurse and midwife, retired global health manager and resident representative, who has been working for the World Health Organization in their Eastern Mediterranean region and national health programs for more than 30 years. As such, her professional career encompasses experience in national, regional and international health systems, in women's health, as well as in humanitarian and development programs.

== Early life and education ==
Born and raised in Bahrain's capital Manama, al-Gasseer was educated at a local secondary school for girls. In 1982, she earned a Bachelor's degree in Nursing Sciences from the American University of Beirut at the time of the Lebanese Civil War. In 1987, she received her MSc in Nursing Sciences (Nurse-Midwifery) from the University of Illinois at Chicago, United States, where she also earned her PhD in Nursing, with specialization in women's health, in 1990.

== Career ==
Before her assignments for the United Nations, al-Gasseer worked for the government of Bahrain, serving in both academic positions and health services, and as advisor to the Ministries of Health in the Gulf region. She is the first woman from Bahrain who started a career in the World Health Organization.

From 1999 to 2003, she worked as Senior Scientist for Nursing and Midwifery at the Health System Cluster of the WHO Headquarters in Geneva. During this time, al-Gasseer established global policies for nursing and midwifery development. This resulted in the first 'Global Strategic Directions for Nursing and Midwifery'. This strategy was based on a global survey including nine partnerships and led to resolutions of the World Health Assembly. Further, she served for UNFPA/WHO as Regional Advisor in reproductive health and family planning in Arab States and Eastern Europe in countries such as Jordan, Sudan, Lebanon, Yemen, Syria, and the occupied Palestinian territories.

In December 2003, al-Gasseer was appointed as WHO's resident representative in Iraq. Further, she served as WHO resident representative in Sudan and then as senior adviser to the regional Director of WHO in the Eastern Mediterranean Region in Cairo, Egypt. There, she was in charge of response to emergencies and humanitarian crises and for research related to public health issues in 22 countries of the Eastern Mediterranean region. Between 2019 and 2023, during her tenure as WHO representative for Egypt, she led the organization's campaign against the COVID-19 pandemic, where Egypt started to produce locally made vaccines.

As part of her responsibilities, al-Gasseer has been leading the WHO's cooperation with national public health programmes, such as fighting against diseases like cholera, hepatitis and HIV/AIDS. Further, her mandate typically encompassed support for health facilities, mental health and training of health-related personnel. She published scientific reports and studies on subjects such as professional training of midwives and nurses, women's health issues or global health policy. As a leading manager for health systems, she has been credited for successfully networking with ministries, NGOs, international donors and organizations. - In this quality, she appeared as keynote speaker on health and development for different stakeholders from civil society, local communities or business representatives.

== Awards and distinctions ==
In 2005, al-Gasseer was awarded an Honorary Doctorate from Glasgow Caledonian University in Scotland, and in 2010, the American Academy of Nursing Fellowship Award. In 2016, she was bestowed the 'First Rank for Competence' by the King of Bahrain, and in 2018, she received an Arab Woman of the Year Award from the London Arabia Organisation in recognition of her leadership role in public health in several countries.

== See also ==
- World Health Report
