= Ameera al-Taweel =

Saudi Arabian philanthropist and former princess

Ameera bint Aidan bin Nayef al-Taweel al-Otaibi
- أميرة بنت عيدان بن نايف الطويل العصيمي العتيبي
- Born: 6 November 1983 (age 42); Riyadh, Saudi Arabia
- Education: University of New Haven (BBA)
- Occupations: Philanthropist; activist
- Years active: 2008–present
- Organization: Silatech
- Spouses: Al-Waleed bin Talal al-Saud (m. 2008; div. 2013) Khalifa bin Butti al-Muhairi (m. 2018)
- Children: 1 (with Khalifa)
- Family: Tribe of Otaibah (by birth); House of Saud (by marriage)

Ameera bint Aidan bin Nayef al-Taweel al-Otaibi (Arabic: أميرة بنت عيدان بن نايف الطويل العصيمي العتيبي; born 6 November 1983) is a Saudi Arabian philanthropist and ex-princess. Born into the Tribe of Otaibah, she became affiliated with the House of Saud after marrying Al-Waleed bin Talal al-Saud in 2008. She was the vice chairwoman of the Al-Waleed bin Talal Foundation, a charity in Saudi Arabia, for the duration of her marriage, which ended in a divorce in 2013. Ameera is currently a member of the board of trustees at Silatech, a youth employment organization in Qatar. She has been a long-standing advocate for Saudi women's rights.

== Biography ==
Al-Taweel was born in Riyadh, Saudi Arabia. Her father is Aidan bin Nayef Al-Taweel Al-Otaibi. She was raised by her divorced mother and her grandparents in Riyadh. At age 18 she met Alwaleed Bin Talal, a man 28 years older than her, while conducting an interview for a school paper. Eventually, they married in 2008 and were later divorced in 2013. Al-Taweel is a magna cum laude graduate of the University of New Haven with a degree in Business Administration.

Al-Taweel married Emirati former billionaire Khalifa bin Butti Al Muhairi in September 2018 in Paris. They have a son, Zayed, born in 2019. Al-Taweel’s husband filed for bankruptcy and has since been embattled in legal proceedings and liquidations of his assets since his empire’s collapse in 2019.

== Philanthropic career ==
Prince Al-Waleed bin Talal al Saud appointed his wife Ameerah as vice-chairperson and head of the executive committee of the Alwaleed bin Talal Foundation in Saudi Arabia, the Alwaleed bin Talal Foundation - Global, (now known under the name Alwaleed Philanthropies), and chairperson of Time Entertainment.

Al-Taweel has inaugurated the Alwaleed Bin Talal Village Orphanage in Burkina Faso and traveled to Pakistan to provide aid and relief to the country's flood victims and to support education. Together with Prince Philip, Duke of Edinburgh, Ameera also formally opened the Prince Alwaleed Bin Talal Centre of Islamic Studies at the University of Cambridge, where she accepted, from Prince Philip, an 800th Anniversary Medal for Outstanding Philanthropy. Most recently she has spearheaded a relief mission to Somalia, where she and her ex-husband, Prince Alwaleed bin Talal, oversaw the distribution of Foundation-sponsored aid.

Al-Taweel has spoken out publicly in the United States on NBC's Today, CNN International and NPR, as well as in Time magazine and Foreign Policy magazine in support of both women's right to drive in her country of Saudi Arabia and the broader issue of women's overall empowerment to contribute fully to Saudi society. She has been featured in Newsweek, The Daily Beast, and The Huffington Post, and was interviewed by Piers Morgan. She spoke in a special session at 2011 Clinton Global Initiative titled "Voices for Change in the Middle East & North Africa," in which she discussed her views on the current movements for change in the region with U.S. President Bill Clinton.

Her self-described approach to reform is one of "evolution, not revolution". In her speech, she said:

"People take their voices to the streets when they are not heard by their governments. If we want stability in the region, we must build institutions of civil society so people can channel their demands through these institutions. If we want prosperity in the region we must invest in young people through encouraging enterprise."

She also says she wants to be among the first women to drive on Saudi roads. In 2012, Ameera was interviewed by Charlie Rose on Bloomberg and spoke about her work for equal rights and women's empowerment in Saudi Arabia through Alwaleed Foundations. Her former husband Prince Al Waleed was warned by his brother Prince Khalid to control Ameera's media appearances or next time they would be punished without prior warning. This tension led to their divorce.

She is a member of the board of trustees of Silatech, an international youth employment organization with a focus on youth empowerment in the Arab world through the creation of jobs and greater economic opportunities to deal with unemployment in the region. She is an honorary member of the Disabled Children's Association and an honorary board member of the Saudi Volunteering Society. She is also The founder and CEO of Times Entertainment and co-founder of Tasamy a non-profit organization that promotes social entrepreneurship.

In 2011, Al-Taweel received the ITP Special "Humanitarian Award" on behalf of the Alwaleed Bin Talal Foundation at the Arabian Business Achievement Awards ceremony. She was the most high-profile newcomer to the CEO Middle East 100 Most Powerful Arab Women 2012 list with a fourth-place ranking. She also received the Woman Personality of the Year Award from the Middle East Excellence Award Institute.
