= Ismahane Elouafi =

Moroccan scientist

Dr. Ismahane A. Elouafi
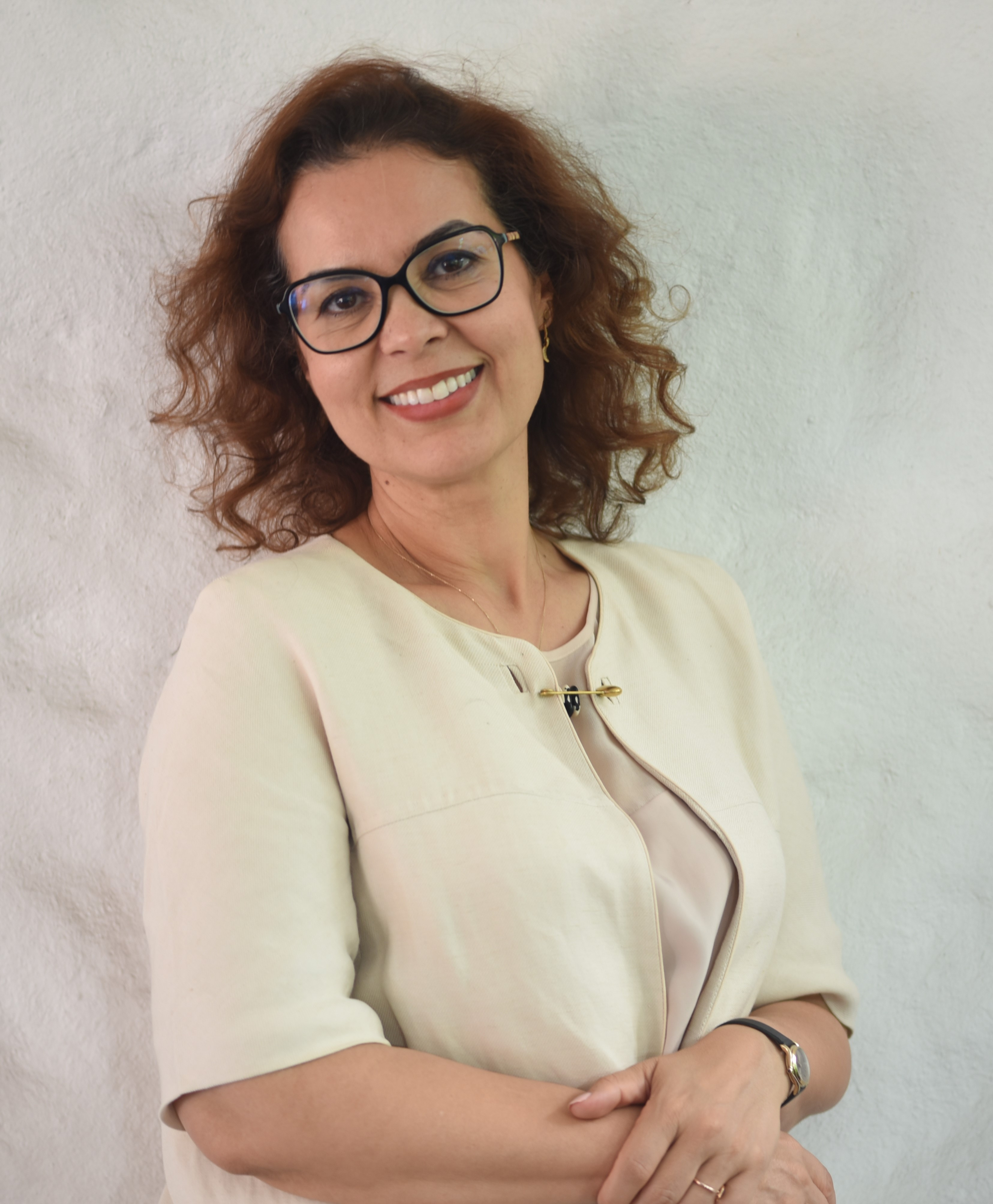
- Ismahane in 2024
- Born: 15 August 1971; Youssoufia, Morocco
- Education: Hassan II Agronomy and Veterinary Institute (Morocco), Cordoba University (Spain)
- Title: Executive Managing Director, CGIAR
- Term: 2023–present
- Board member of: International Food Policy Research Institute; CABI

Notes
- CGIAR EMD appointment: https://www.cgiar.org/news-events/news/emd-elouafi-2023

Ismahane Elouafi (Arabic: أسمهان الوافي) is a Moroccan scientist, who currently holds the position of Executive Managing Director of CGIAR. Formerly Chief Scientist of the Food and Agriculture Organization of the United Nations (FAO), she is ranked among the 20 most influential women in science in the Islamic world and is internationally known for her work on promoting neglected and underutilized crops, use of non-fresh water in agriculture, and empowerment of women in science. In 2025, Time magazine listed her as one of the world's 100 most influential people.

She has nearly two decades of experience in agricultural research and development in Asia, Africa and the Middle East. She led the International Center for Biosaline Agriculture (ICBA), based in Dubai, the United Arab Emirates, from 2012 until 2020.

== Education ==
Initially, Elouafi trained at the Aviation High School in Morocco to be one of the country's first female fighter pilots. However, the plan to have women piloting the nation's fighter planes was shelved and she had to choose on a new career.

Elouafi went on to attend the Hassan II Institute of Agronomy and Veterinary Medicine, Morocco, where she earned a B.Sc. in Agricultural Sciences in 1993 and an M.Sc. in Genetics & Plant Breeding in 1995. In 2001, she received a Ph.D. in genetics from the University of Cordoba, Spain.

== Career ==
In 2006–2007, Elouafi served as Senior Adviser to the Assistant Deputy Minister, Agriculture and Agri-Food Canada (AAFC) Research Branch in Ottawa, Canada, where she led the development of a new peer-review-based internal process for AAFC research.

In May 2007, she joined the Canadian Food Inspection Agency as the National Manager of Plant Research Section. In 2010, she was promoted to Director of Research Management and Partnerships Division at the Canadian Food Inspection Agency and developed novel partnership models with Genome Canada, scientific departments in Canada and the private sector.

In 2012, Elouafi was appointed Director General of ICBA, where she has overseen the development of the center's strategy for 2013–2023.

In her 2019 role, she initiated a flagship program to empower Arab women scientists working in agricultural research and development called Awla, which is supported by the Bill & Melinda Gates Foundation, the Islamic Development Bank and CGIAR Research Program on Wheat.

In 2020, Elouafi became Chief Scientist at the Food and Agriculture Organization of the United Nations (FAO), a new position created within FAO's core leadership structure. Her appointment was announced by FAO Director-General QU Dongyu at the 35th FAO Regional Conference for the Near East in September 2020.

Elouafi sits on the boards of the International Food Policy Research Institute and the Centre for Agriculture and Biosciences International (CABI).

She has also been a member of strategy experts panels of the Food and Agriculture Organization of the United Nations (FAO) since September 2020, and the Global Commission on Adaptation.

Previously, she had also worked as a scientist with several international research organizations, including the International Center for Agricultural Research in the Dry Areas (ICARDA), Japan International Research Center for Agricultural Sciences (JIRCAS), and the International Maize and Wheat Improvement Center (CIMMYT).

In 2023 she became the Incoming Executive Managing Director of CGIAR whose budget of billions is addressed to maintain global food security.

== Awards ==
Elouafi is a recipient of several prestigious awards and accolades, including the National Reward Medal by His Majesty Mohamed VI, the King of Morocco (2014), and the Excellence in Science Award from the Global Thinkers Forum (2014).

In 2014, Muslim Science ranked her among the 20 Most Influential Women in Science in the Islamic World under the Shapers Category.

In 2014–2016, CEO-Middle East Magazine listed Dr. Elouafi among the World's 100 Most Powerful Arab Women in Science.

In 2016, she won the prestigious Arab Women of the Year Award by the London Arabia Organisation for Achievements in Science.

The New York Times named her as one of the ten women that change the landscape of leadership, following her appointment as the first Chief Scientist of FAO.

New African Magazine named her as one of the 100 Most Influential Africans 2025

== See also ==
- CGIAR
- Qu Dongyu
