= 2022 FIFA World Cup final =

Men's World Cup final, held in Qatar

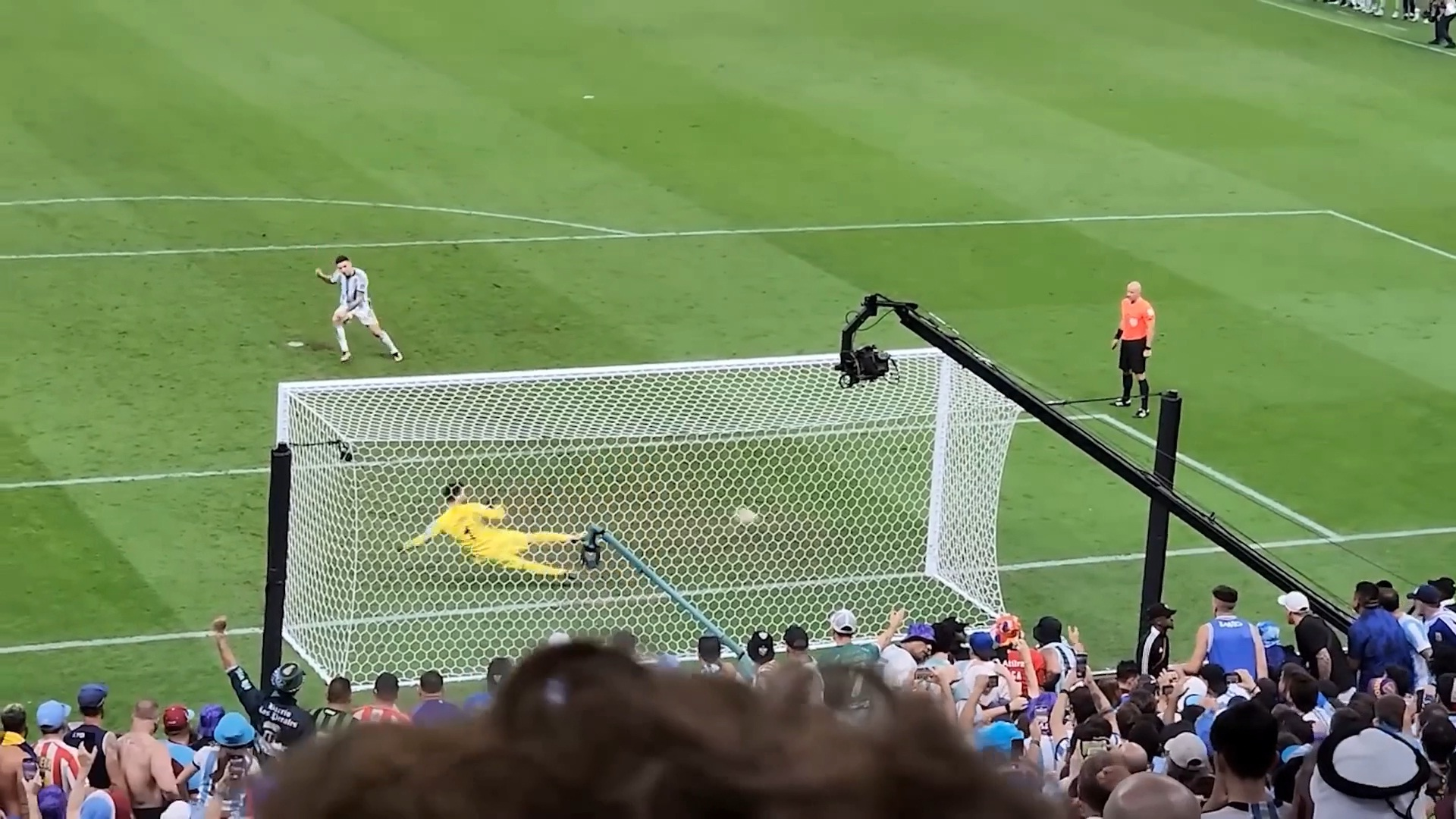
- Gonzalo Montiel's match-winning penalty kick in the penalty shoot-out
- Event: 2022 FIFA World Cup
Argentina	France
3	3
- After extra time Argentina won 4–2 on penalties
- Date: 18 December 2022
- Venue: Lusail Stadium, Lusail
- Man of the Match: Lionel Messi (Argentina)
- Referee: Szymon Marciniak (Poland)
- Attendance: 88,966
- Weather: Partly cloudy 22 °C (72 °F); 64% humidity

The final match of the 2022 FIFA World Cup, the 22nd edition of FIFA's competition for men's national football teams, was played at Lusail Stadium in Lusail, Qatar, on 18 December 2022 (Qatari National Day), and was contested by Argentina and defending champions France. With a record 1.5 billion people watching on television, the final became one of the most widely watched televised sporting events in history.

The tournament was hosted by Qatar and was contested by 31 other teams who emerged victorious from the qualification phase, which was organised by the six FIFA confederations. The 32 teams competed in a group stage, from which 16 teams qualified for the knockout stage. In their route to the final, Argentina finished first in Group C, first losing to Saudi Arabia 2–1, and then defeating both Mexico and Poland 2–0. They then defeated Australia 2–1 in the round of 16, the Netherlands in the quarter-final through a tense penalty shoot-out after a 2–2 draw in extra time, and Croatia in the semi-final 3–0. France finished first in Group D with two wins and one loss (4–1 win over Australia, 2–1 win over Denmark, and a 1–0 loss to Tunisia). They defeated Poland 3–1 in the round of 16, England 2–1 in the quarter-final, and Morocco 2–0 in the semi-final. The final took place in front of 88,966 spectators and was refereed by Szymon Marciniak.

Argentina took a 1–0 lead after Lionel Messi scored from a penalty kick in the 23rd minute. Ángel Di María made it 2–0 in the 36th minute with a low shot into the corner of the goal after a sweeping Argentina counterattack. France failed to make a shot on goal for the vast majority of the match, until Kylian Mbappé scored two goals within 97 seconds (the first of which was from a penalty kick), making the score 2–2 in the 81st minute. During extra time, Messi scored again to give Argentina a 3–2 lead. Mbappé scored a second penalty to tie the game 3–3 with just a few minutes remaining, becoming the second male player to score a hat-trick in a World Cup final after Geoff Hurst in 1966. Argentina won the ensuing penalty shoot-out 4–2 to win their third World Cup, and their first since 1986.

It was the second time that Argentina reached the World Cup final after losing their opening match, the other occasion being in 1990. It was the second time that a team won the tournament after losing their opening match, following Spain in 2010. France became the first team in history to score three goals in a World Cup final and lose. Messi was named the man of the match and won the Golden Ball as FIFA's best player of the tournament. He became the first player to win a second World Cup Golden Ball, having previously won it in 2014. The 2022 final was ranked by the football media and fans alike as one of the greatest World Cup finals, and one of the greatest matches in football history.

== Background ==
Argentina had previously won the World Cup in 1978 and 1986. They had finished as runners-up in 1930, 1990 and 2014. After the 2014 final loss, they lost two consecutive Copa América finals to Chile, in 2015 and 2016. After being eliminated from the 2018 World Cup in the first knockout round, and finishing third in the 2019 Copa América, Argentina's newly appointed coach Lionel Scaloni led them to their first international title since 1993 when they defeated defending champions Brazil 1–0 in the 2021 Copa América final, handing captain Lionel Messi his first senior international title. After defeating Italy in the 2022 Finalissima, Argentina were considered one of the favourites to win the 2022 World Cup.

France were the defending champions from the 2018 World Cup, which made this the first time since the 2002 final that a team had made consecutive appearances in the final, and the first time since 1998 that the title holders qualified for the subsequent final—both feats were achieved by Brazil. France had also previously won the World Cup in 1998. France also reached the 2006 final, but lost to Italy in a penalty shoot-out. As defending champions, France also entered the 2022 World Cup as one of the favourites to win. They aimed to become the third country to successfully defend a World Cup title, after Italy in 1938 and Brazil in 1962. France manager Didier Deschamps was seeking to become the second manager to win two men's FIFA World Cup titles, after Vittorio Pozzo with Italy in 1934 and 1938. Having won the 1998 tournament as a player, Deschamps was also seeking to become the third person to win three World Cup titles, after Pelé (all three as a player) and Mário Zagallo (two as a player, one as a manager).

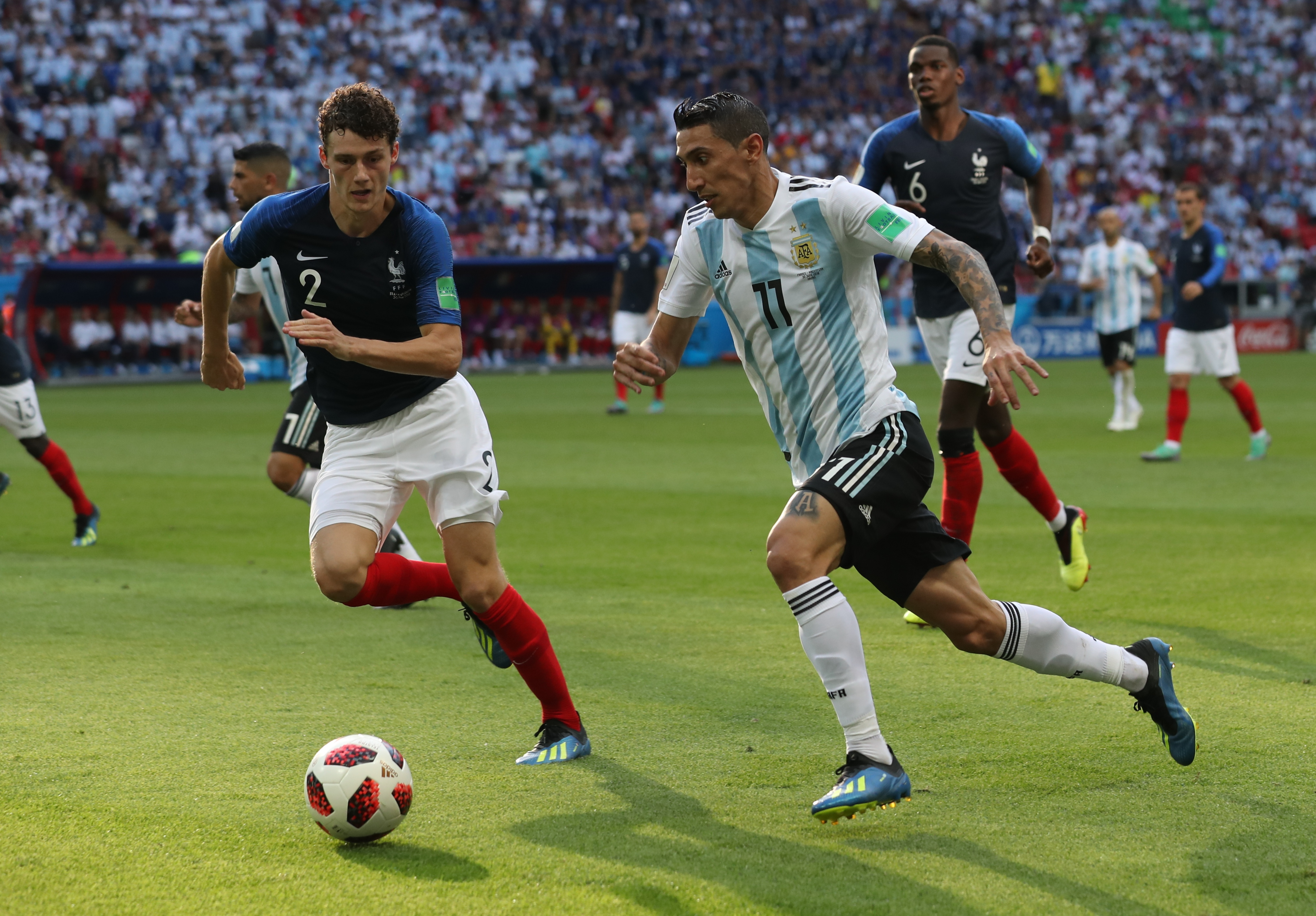
Argentina v France match in the round of 16 of the 2018 FIFA World Cup in Russia

The two nations met in the knockout stage for the second straight World Cup. In 2018 in Russia at the Kazan Arena in the round of 16, France won the encounter 4–3 in what The Independent called "one of the greatest World Cup games of all time". Antoine Griezmann opened the scoring with a penalty before Ángel Di María and Gabriel Mercado put Argentina in front, with France then scoring the next three goals courtesy of Benjamin Pavard's volley outside of the box – which was later voted as the goal of the tournament – and then Kylian Mbappé twice. Sergio Agüero reduced the deficit to one in stoppage time, but Argentina was unable to equalise and send the match to extra time.

The match ball for the 2022 FIFA World Cup semi-finals, match for third place and final was announced on 11 December 2022. It was a variation of the Adidas Al Rihla used in the rest of the tournament named the Adidas Al-Hilm, meaning "The Dream" in Arabic, a reference to every nation's dream of lifting the FIFA World Cup. Whilst the technical aspects of the ball are the same, the colour is different from the Al-Rihla balls used in the group stages and preceding knockout games, with a Gold Metallic, maroon, Collegiate Burgundy, and red design, a reference to the national colours of host nation Qatar and the golden colours shared by the final's venue Lusail Stadium and the FIFA World Cup Trophy. It is the fifth special ball for FIFA World Cup final matches, after the +Teamgeist Berlin, Jo'bulani, Brazuca Final Rio, and Telstar Mechta.

== Venue ==
The final was played at Lusail Stadium in Lusail, Qatar, located about 15 kilometres (9.3 mi) north of the city centre of Doha. The stadium was intended to host the final as part of Qatar's World Cup bid, and was confirmed as the final venue on 15 July 2020. The stadium was allocated to also host nine previous World Cup matches, with six in the group stage and three other knockout fixtures.

Lusail Stadium, owned by the Qatar Football Association, was built as part of Qatar's winning bid for the World Cup. The stadium was designed by British firm Foster and Partners and Populous, supported by MANICA Architecture. The stadium uses solar power to be cooled and is claimed to have a carbon zero footprint. Construction began in April 2017, and was planned to finish in 2020. Completion of the stadium was postponed, with construction ultimately finished in November 2021. The stadium hosted its first match, the Lusail Super Cup, on 9 September 2022, later than expected.

== Route to the final ==
=== Argentina ===
Argentina's route to the final
	Opponent	Result
1	Saudi Arabia	1–2
2	Mexico	2–0
3	Poland	2–0
R16	Australia	2–1
QF	Netherlands	2–2 (a.e.t.) (4–3 p)
SF	Croatia	3–0

Drawn in group C and coming off a three-year, 36-game-long unbeaten streak, Argentina were defeated in their opening game 2–1 by Saudi Arabia. Lionel Messi's opener from the penalty spot was followed by several disallowed Argentina goals which were ruled offside. Immediately after half-time, Saudi Arabia stunned Argentina with two goals from Saleh Al-Shehri and Salem Al-Dawsari in a span of five minutes before shutting out any further attempts by the South Americans in a disciplined defensive performance. However, the Argentines bounced back from the shock loss to overcome Mexico 2–0 after a long-range effort by Messi who then assisted Enzo Fernández for the second, reigniting their World Cup hopes. Boosted by the win, Argentina then beat Poland with the same scoreline with goals from Alexis Mac Allister and Julián Alvarez despite a first-half penalty miss from Messi, taking first place in Group C and condemning both Mexico and Saudi Arabia to World Cup elimination.

In the round of 16, the Argentines found themselves matched against group D runners-up Australia; Messi's first-ever knockout-stage goal was followed by an astute goal by Alvarez, who intercepted Australian goalkeeper Mathew Ryan to finish into an empty net as Argentina overcame Australia 2–1, despite an own goal from Fernández creating a frantic finish which required a late save from point-blank range by Emiliano Martínez. Continuing a rivalry, they proceed to square off against the Netherlands in the quarter-finals. In a controversial match noted for its dramatic nature, chaotic atmosphere, and fury between both teams, it saw Argentina lead by two goals coming from Nahuel Molina and a penalty from Messi, but succumbed to two late goals by Wout Weghorst as regulation time ended 2–2 after 90 minutes; neither could find the breakthrough in extra time and penalties were used to decide the winner. Emiliano Martínez saved the first two Dutch penalties from Virgil van Dijk and Steven Berghuis, while only Fernández missed for Argentina as Lautaro Martínez scored the decisive last kick of the game, a result reminiscent of their 2014 most recent, also knockout stage meeting and sending them through the semi-finals, as they meet 2018 runners up Croatia. In a rematch of the 2018 encounter when Croatia had won 3–0, Argentina decisively beat Croatia by the same scoreline. Lionel Messi scored a first-half penalty before Alvarez scored a solo effort five minutes later. Messi then assisted Alvarez for his double in the second half, as Argentina booked their place in the final for the second time in eight years.

=== France ===
France's route to the final
	Opponent	Result
1	Australia	4–1
2	Denmark	2–1
3	Tunisia	0–1
R16	Poland	3–1
QF	England	2–1
SF	Morocco	2–0

France started their World Cup campaign as the defending world champions, having won the most recent tournament in Russia, and was drawn in group D. Their first meeting was against AFC representative Australia. The French suffered a shock deficit after nine minutes due to a goal by Craig Goodwin, but were able to stage a comeback with a double from Olivier Giroud together with goals from Adrien Rabiot and Kylian Mbappé to win 4–1. Empowered by the win, France overcame a highly organised and threatening Denmark side with Mbappé striking twice in the second half, despite conceding an equaliser from Andreas Christensen. France won 2–1 and became the first team to progress to the knockout stage of the World Cup in Qatar and the first European world champions to do so since 1994. With progression assured, France rotated most of their team, resting their key players for the final game against a desperate Tunisia; France resultantly lost 1–0 courtesy of a goal by French-born Wahbi Khazri before having an equaliser by Antoine Griezmann disallowed. France maintained top of the group due to a superior goal difference over Australia.

In the round of 16, France overcame group C runners-up Poland 3–1 with goals from Giroud and Mbappé, despite conceding a late penalty from Robert Lewandowski. The quarter-finals saw France battling old rivals England in a tense match, with France defeating England 2–1 with goals from Aurélien Tchouaméni and Giroud; England found an equaliser for 1–1 courtesy of a penalty by Harry Kane but a second penalty to equalise the game was missed by Kane, granting France a place in the semi-finals. France then faced the biggest underdog of the tournament, Morocco, who had beaten both Iberian representatives Spain and Portugal in the process; the French were able to end the history-making run by the African nation with two goals from Théo Hernandez and Randal Kolo Muani for a 2–0 result. France reached their second consecutive World Cup final for the first time in their history.

== Pre-match ==
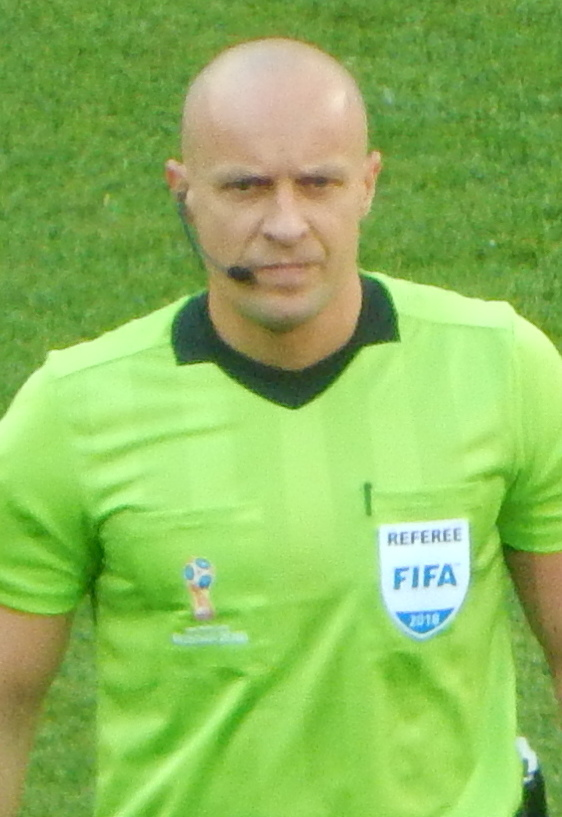
Szymon Marciniak officiated the final.

Polish referee Szymon Marciniak was named as the referee of the final on 15 December 2022, with fellow Poles Paweł Sokolnicki and Tomasz Listkiewicz appointed as assistant referees.

Marciniak became a FIFA referee in 2011 and had previously served as a referee at the UEFA Euro 2016 and 2018 FIFA World Cup, as well as during the 2018 UEFA Super Cup. Earlier in the tournament, Marciniak officiated the France–Denmark group stage game, as well as the Argentina–Australia match in the round of 16. It was the first time that a Polish referee led the team of officials at a World Cup final, and the second time that a Polish referee was included among the officials during such a match, after Michał Listkiewicz (father of Marciniak's assistant Tomasz) served as a linesman during the 1990 FIFA World Cup final.

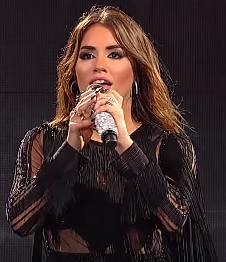
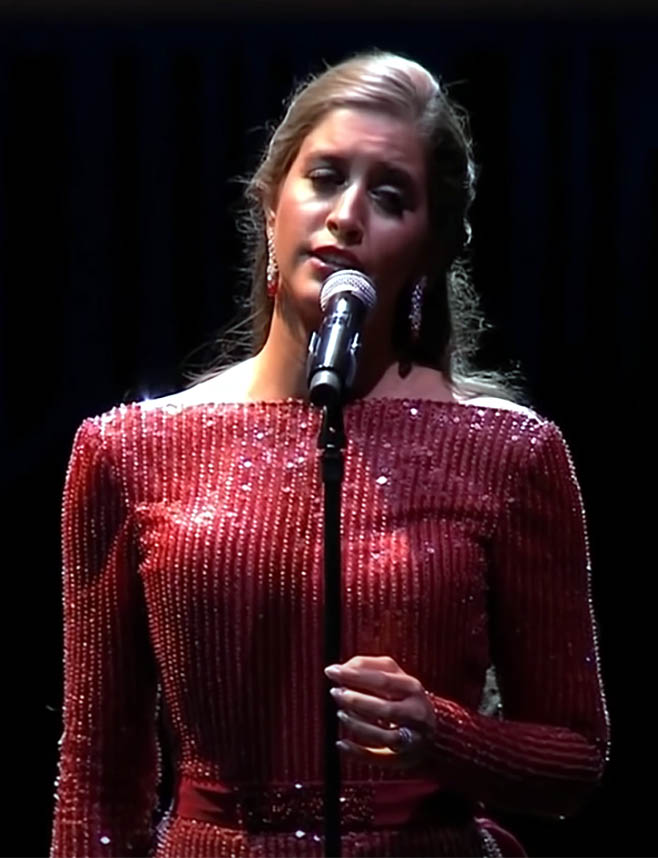
Prior to the match, Lali Espósito (left) and Farrah Eldibany sang the Argentine and French national anthems, respectively.

Ismail Elfath and Kathryn Nesbitt of the United States were appointed as fourth official and reserve assistant referee, respectively, while another Pole, Tomasz Kwiatkowski, led the video assistant referee team. Venezuelan Juan Soto served as assistant video assistant referee, American Kyle Atkins was the offside video assistant referee, and the role of support video assistant referee was assigned to Mexican Fernando Guerrero. German Bastian Dankert and American Corey Parker served as stand-by video assistant referee and stand-by assistant video assistant referee, respectively.

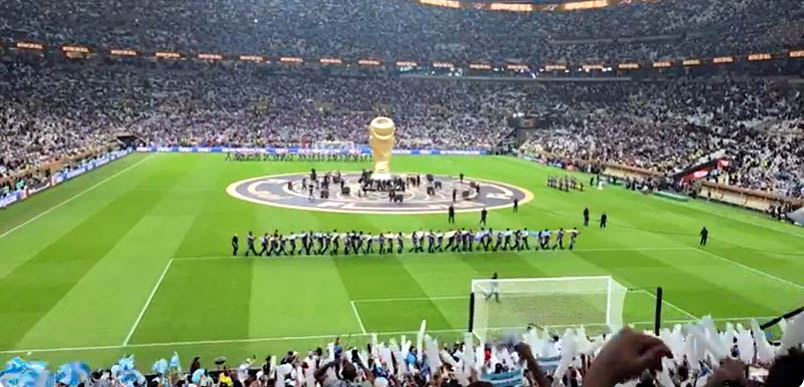
Closing ceremony prior to the match

Several heads of state were in attendance, among them Qatari Emir Tamim bin Hamad Al Thani, Turkish president Recep Tayyip Erdoğan, and French president Emmanuel Macron. Various members of the FIFA Council and FIFA president Gianni Infantino were also in attendance. Argentine head of state Alberto Fernández did not attend after having reportedly refused to travel to Qatar due to potential political backlash.

However, Claudio Tapia, the president of the Argentine Football Association was present in the final.

The tournament's closing ceremony was held prior to the start of the match; it featured a collaboration between Puerto Rican singer Ozuna and French singer Gims. Also performing were Nora Fatehi, Balqees, Rahma Riad and Manal.

The winners trophy was unveiled by World Cup winning captain Iker Casillas and Indian actress Deepika Padukone.

Argentine singer Lali Espósito sang the "Argentine National Anthem" and Egyptian mezzo-soprano Farrah Eldibany sang the French national anthem, "La Marseillaise", before the match.

== Match ==
=== Summary ===
==== First half ====
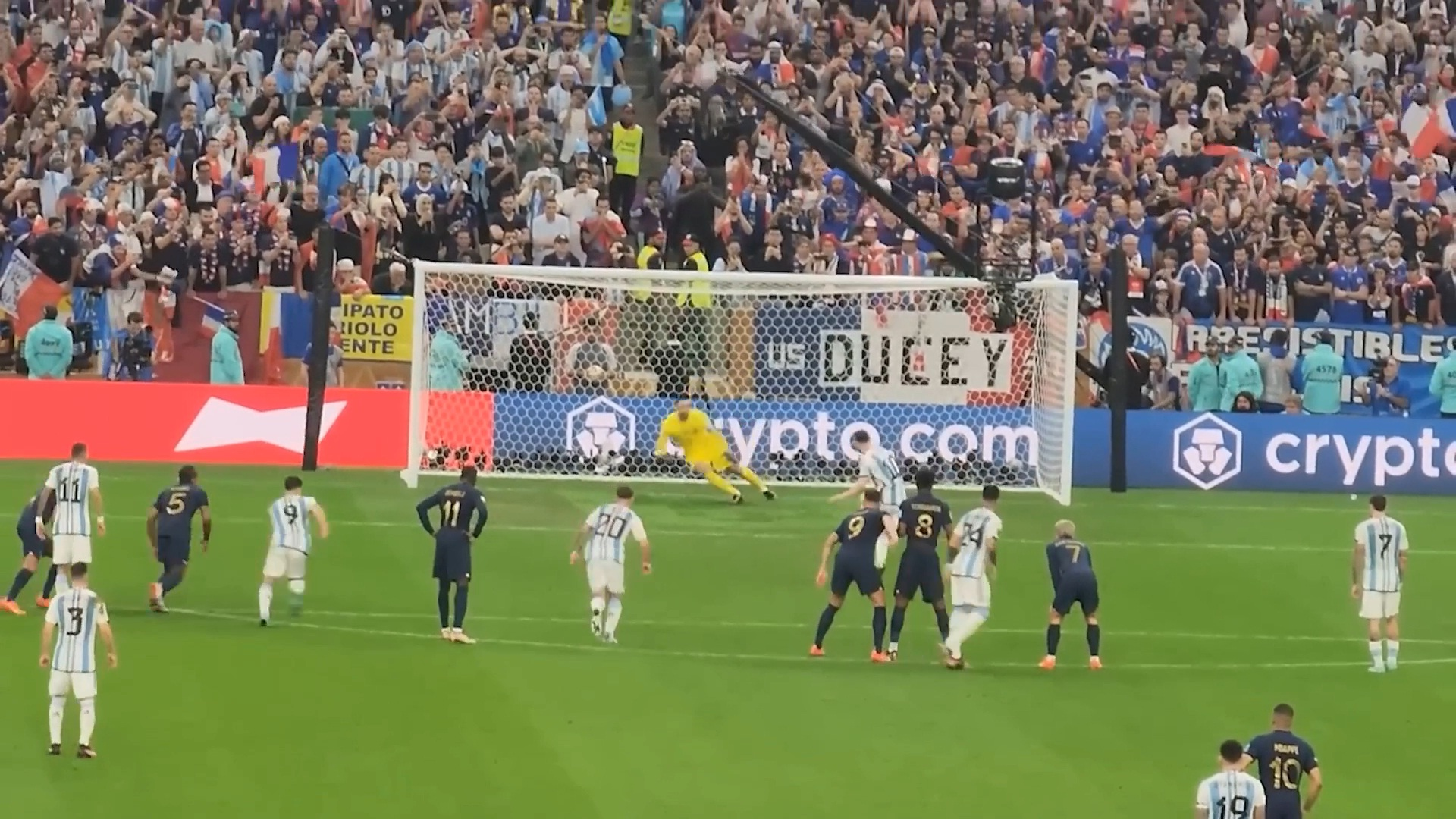
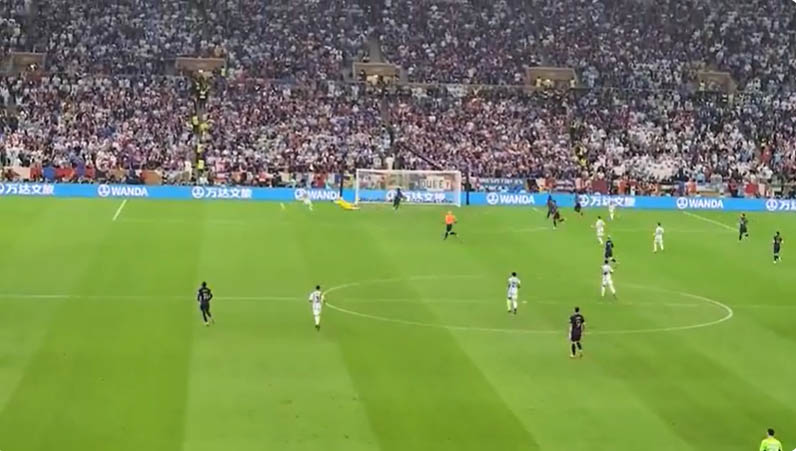
The two goals of Argentina in the first half, Lionel Messi with a penalty kick (left), and Angel Di María (right)

France kicked off the match at 18:00 local time (15:00 UTC) in front of a crowd of 88,966.

Argentina were awarded a penalty in the 21st minute when Ángel Di María was fouled in the penalty area by Ousmane Dembélé as Di María cut in from the left. Lionel Messi scored the penalty with a low shot to the right corner. In the 36th minute, Di Maria finished a sweeping Argentina counter-attack to make it 2–0, shooting with his left foot over the goalkeeper to the right corner of the net after a pass from Alexis Mac Allister from the right. France made two early substitutions near the end of the first half and went into half-time trailing 0–2.

==== Second half ====
Argentina were on course for the win, controlling possession, and defensively shutting down France, who failed to have an attempt on goal until the 80th minute, at which point France was awarded a penalty after Randal Kolo Muani was brought down in the penalty area by Nicolás Otamendi. Kylian Mbappé scored the penalty low to the left corner, despite Emiliano Martínez getting a hand on the ball, making the game 2–1. 97 seconds later, Kingsley Coman tackled Messi right as the game restarted, starting a rapid counter-attack which finished with Mbappé first-time volleying a lofted pass from Marcus Thuram with his right foot as he was falling to the ground to the bottom-right corner of the net to make the game 2–2; Martínez again attempted to parry the ball but couldn't keep it out.

Five minutes after Mbappé's equaliser, Thuram went down in the penalty box after slightly tripping on Enzo Fernández's leg, only to be booked for diving. Both teams came close to finishing the game near the end of added time as Adrien Rabiot fired a quick shot inside the box, forcing a fumbling save from Emiliano Martínez; then three minutes later Messi had a hard shot parried over the bar by Hugo Lloris. With the score tied at the end of regulation time, the match went to extra time.

==== Extra time ====
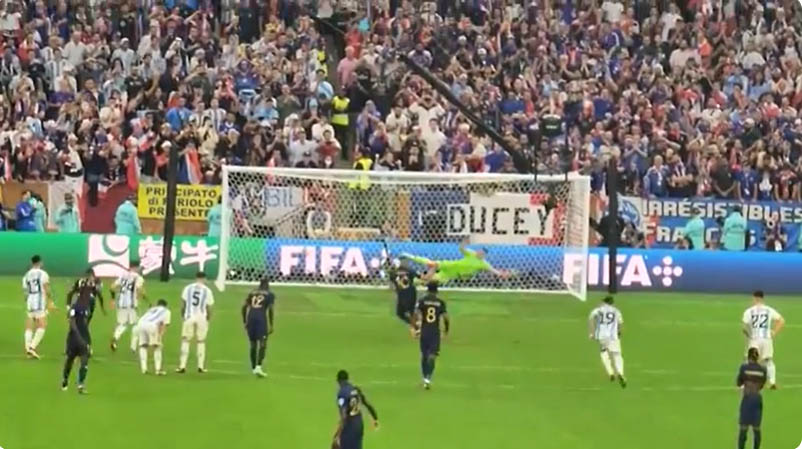
Mbappé scoring France's third goal with a penalty kick awarded in extra time

After first half of extra time finished goalless, notably highlighted by two one-on-one opportunities missed by Lautaro Martínez, Messi scored again for Argentina in the second period of extra time when he finished from close range after Lloris had parried a shot from Lautaro Martínez on the right, in what seemed to be the winning goal. However, France was awarded a second penalty in the 116th minute after a shot by Mbappé hit the arm of Gonzalo Montiel. Mbappé scored his third goal with his penalty kick to the left, sending Martínez the wrong way and becoming the second player to score a hat-trick in a men's World Cup final after Geoff Hurst for England in 1966. The referee then blew the final whistle of extra time and the match went to a penalty shoot-out.

==== Penalty shoot-out ====
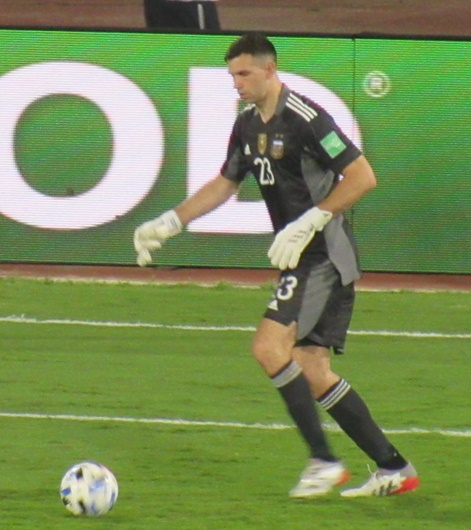
Argentina goalkeeper Emiliano Martínez made two key saves during the last minute of extra time and the decisive penalty shoot-out.

For the third time in history, the World Cup final would be decided on penalties. With Italy participating in the two previous finals that featured a shootout, this would be the first final not featuring them to go to penalties as they failed to qualify for this tournament. Mbappé and Messi successfully converted the first two attempts to begin the penalty shoot-out at 1–1. Argentina goalkeeper Martínez would continue to use the psychological tactics and means of gamesmanship that he utilised during the penalty shoot-outs in the quarter-final against the Netherlands. After delaying Kingsley Coman's attempt by arguing with the referee, Martínez then saved Coman's shot, which was down low to Martínez's right. Dybala sent a shot into the net up the middle to give Argentina a 2–1 lead.

Before Aurélien Tchouaméni's shot, Martínez picked up the ball and then threw it to the edge of the box. Tchouaméni then sent his shot wide of the goal to the left. Leandro Paredes then scored to put France on the brink of defeat at 3–1. Kolo Muani kept France alive by scoring his chance and reducing France's deficit to 3–2; Martínez attempted to use his psychological tactics on Kolo Muani but was instead shown a yellow card. Montiel was then given a chance to make up for his late handball by clinching the championship for Argentina. Montiel scored low to the left, securing the 4–2 penalty shoot-out victory for Argentina and giving them their third World Cup trophy and first since 1986.

=== Details ===
18 December 2022
18:00 AST

Argentina	3–3 (a.e.t.)	France
Messi 23' (pen.), 108'; Di María 36'		Mbappé 80' (pen.), 81', 118' (pen.)
Penalties
Messi (penalty scored); Dybala (penalty scored); Paredes (penalty scored); Montiel (penalty scored)	4–2	(penalty scored) Mbappé; (penalty missed) Coman; (penalty missed) Tchouaméni; (penalty scored) Kolo Muani

Lusail Stadium, Lusail
Attendance: 88,966
Referee: Szymon Marciniak (Poland)

Argentina	France

GK	23	Emiliano Martínez	(yellow card) PSO
RB	26	Nahuel Molina		(substituted off) 91'
CB	13	Cristian Romero
CB	19	Nicolás Otamendi
LB	3	Nicolás Tagliafico		(substituted off) 120+1'
DM	24	Enzo Fernández	(yellow card) 45+7'
CM	20	Alexis Mac Allister		(substituted off) 116'
CM	7	Rodrigo De Paul		(substituted off) 102'
RF	10	Lionel Messi (c)
CF	9	Julián Alvarez		(substituted off) 102'
LF	11	Ángel Di María		(substituted off) 64'
Substitutions:
MF	8	Marcos Acuña	(yellow card) 90+8'	(substituted on) 64'
DF	4	Gonzalo Montiel	(yellow card) 116'	(substituted on) 91'
MF	5	Leandro Paredes	(yellow card) 114'	(substituted on) 102'
FW	22	Lautaro Martínez		(substituted on) 102'
DF	6	Germán Pezzella		(substituted on) 116'
FW	21	Paulo Dybala		(substituted on) 120+1'
Manager:
Lionel Scaloni

GK	1	Hugo Lloris (c)
RB	5	Jules Koundé		(substituted off) 120+1'
CB	4	Raphaël Varane		(substituted off) 113'
CB	18	Dayot Upamecano
LB	22	Théo Hernandez		(substituted off) 71'
CM	8	Aurélien Tchouaméni
CM	14	Adrien Rabiot	(yellow card) 55'	(substituted off) 96' (Note: Rabiot suffered a knock to the head in the 94th minute. Therefore, his substitution for Fofana fell under FIFA's "concussion protocol", which allows a player at risk of a concussion to be substituted without taking account either the substitution window nor the amount of players already substituted.)
RW	11	Ousmane Dembélé		(substituted off) 41'
AM	7	Antoine Griezmann		(substituted off) 71'
LW	10	Kylian Mbappé
CF	9	Olivier Giroud	(yellow card) 90+5'	(substituted off) 41'
Substitutions:
FW	12	Randal Kolo Muani		(substituted on) 41'
FW	26	Marcus Thuram	(yellow card) 87'	(substituted on) 41'
FW	20	Kingsley Coman		(substituted on) 71'
MF	25	Eduardo Camavinga		(substituted on) 71'
MF	13	Youssouf Fofana		(substituted on) 96'
DF	24	Ibrahima Konaté		(substituted on) 113'
DF	3	Axel Disasi		(substituted on) 120+1'
Manager:
Didier Deschamps

Man of the Match:
Lionel Messi (Argentina)

Assistant referees:
Paweł Sokolnicki (Poland)
Tomasz Listkiewicz (Poland)
Fourth official:
Ismail Elfath (United States)
Reserve assistant referee:
Kathryn Nesbitt (United States)
Video assistant referee:
Tomasz Kwiatkowski (Poland)
Assistant video assistant referees:
Juan Soto (Venezuela)
Kyle Atkins (United States)
Fernando Guerrero (Mexico)
Stand-by video assistant referee:
Bastian Dankert (Germany)
Stand-by assistant video assistant referee:
Corey Parker (United States)

Match rules

- 90 minutes
- 30 minutes of extra time if necessary
- Penalty shoot-out if scores still level
- Maximum of fifteen named substitutes
- Maximum of five substitutions, with a sixth allowed in extra time
- Maximum of three substitution opportunities, with a fourth allowed in extra time
- Maximum of one concussion substitution (protocol A)

=== Statistics ===
First half
Statistic	Argentina	France
Goals scored	2	0
Total shots	6	0
Shots on target	3	0
Saves	0	1
Ball possession	59%	41%
Corner kicks	2	0
Fouls committed	10	11
Offsides	3	0
Yellow cards	1	0
Red cards	0	0

Second half
Statistic	Argentina	France
Goals scored	0	2
Total shots	6	6
Shots on target	4	3
Saves	1	4
Ball possession	45%	55%
Corner kicks	2	3
Fouls committed	9	5
Offsides	0	2
Yellow cards	1	3
Red cards	0	0

Extra time
Statistic	Argentina	France
Goals scored	1	1
Total shots	8	4
Shots on target	3	2
Saves	1	2
Ball possession	62%	38%
Corner kicks	2	2
Fouls committed	6	3
Offsides	1	2
Yellow cards	2	0
Red cards	0	0

Overall
Statistic	Argentina	France
Goals scored	3	3
Total shots	20	10
Shots on target	10	5
Saves	2	7
Ball possession	54%	46%
Corner kicks	6	5
Fouls committed	26 (Note: Emiliano Martínez did not foul a French player, but received a yellow card foul due to unsporting behaviour in the penalty shoot-out, which counts as a team foul.)	19
Offsides	4	4
Yellow cards	5	3
Red cards	0	0

== Post-match ==
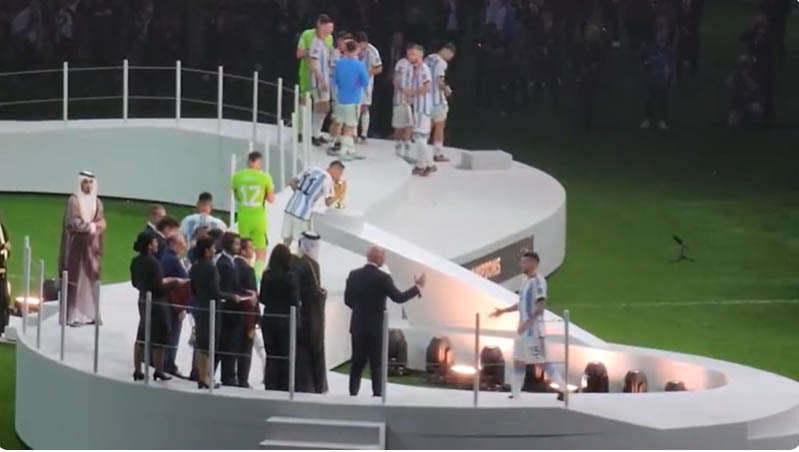
Angel Di María (11) kissing the trophy; besides him, goalkeeper Gerónimo Rulli (12)

Pundits, commentators, and audiences praised the intensity, stressful atmosphere, and thrilling back-and-forth nature of the match, highlighting the number of goals scored, and with many media outlets spotlighting it as a duel between Paris Saint-Germain teammates Messi and Mbappé. The match has since been hailed by journalists as one of the most exciting World Cup finals, and among the greatest football matches ever.

With the victory, Argentina won their third FIFA World Cup title to surpass France and Uruguay, their titles ranking behind only Brazil's five and the four of Italy and Germany. They became the first South American and first non-European side to win the World Cup since Brazil in 2002, and the first reigning champions of the Copa América to win the World Cup. Having won on penalties against the Netherlands in the quarter-finals, Argentina became the first team to have won on that method twice en route to the title.

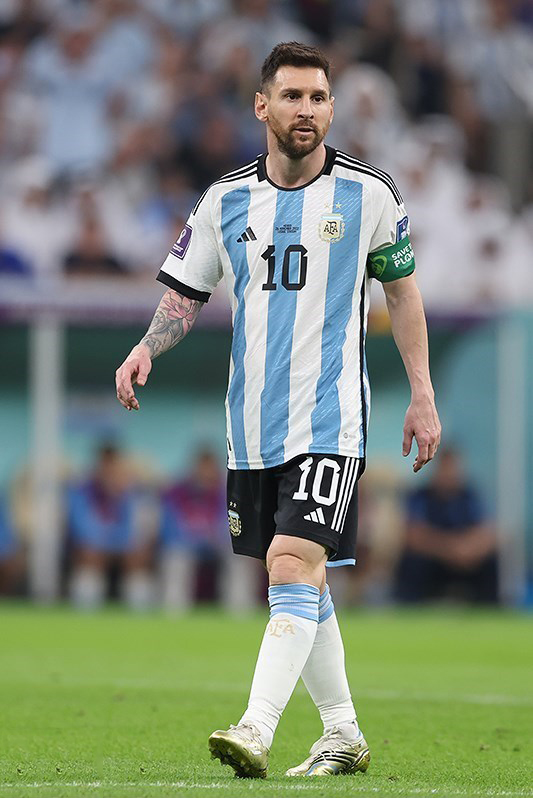
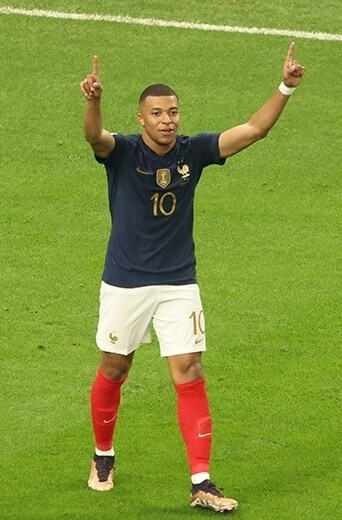
Argentina captain and forward Lionel Messi (left) was named man of the match. France forward Kylian Mbappé (right) became the second player in history to score a hat-trick in a World Cup final.

It was the tenth World Cup title for a South American side, and the eighth South American victory in eleven finals facing European opposition. France became the third defending champions to lose in the following final, after Argentina in 1990 and Brazil in 1998. The match was the third FIFA World Cup final to be decided by a penalty shoot-out, after 1994 and 2006, the latter of which France lost to Italy. The six goals in the final brought the total number of goals in the tournament to a record 172, surpassing the 171 goals scored in 1998 and 2014.

FIFA president Gianni Infantino was present on the pitch stage during the awards ceremony to hand out the medals and present the trophy to the Argentine captain Lionel Messi. He was joined by Qatari Emir Tamim bin Hamad Al Thani, French president Emmanuel Macron, Argentine Football Association president Claudio Tapia, French Football Federation president Noël Le Graët, CONMEBOL president Alejandro Domínguez and UEFA president Aleksander Čeferin. Sergio Batista and Nery Pumpido, World Cup winners with Argentina in 1986, brought the trophy onto the pitch for the ceremony. Before being presented with the trophy by the Emir and Infantino, Messi was given a bisht to wear by the Emir prior to the trophy celebration. The trophy presentation had scenery unlike previous tournaments, with confetti replaced by pyrotechnics and lights with a backdrop of some orchestral cinematic music.

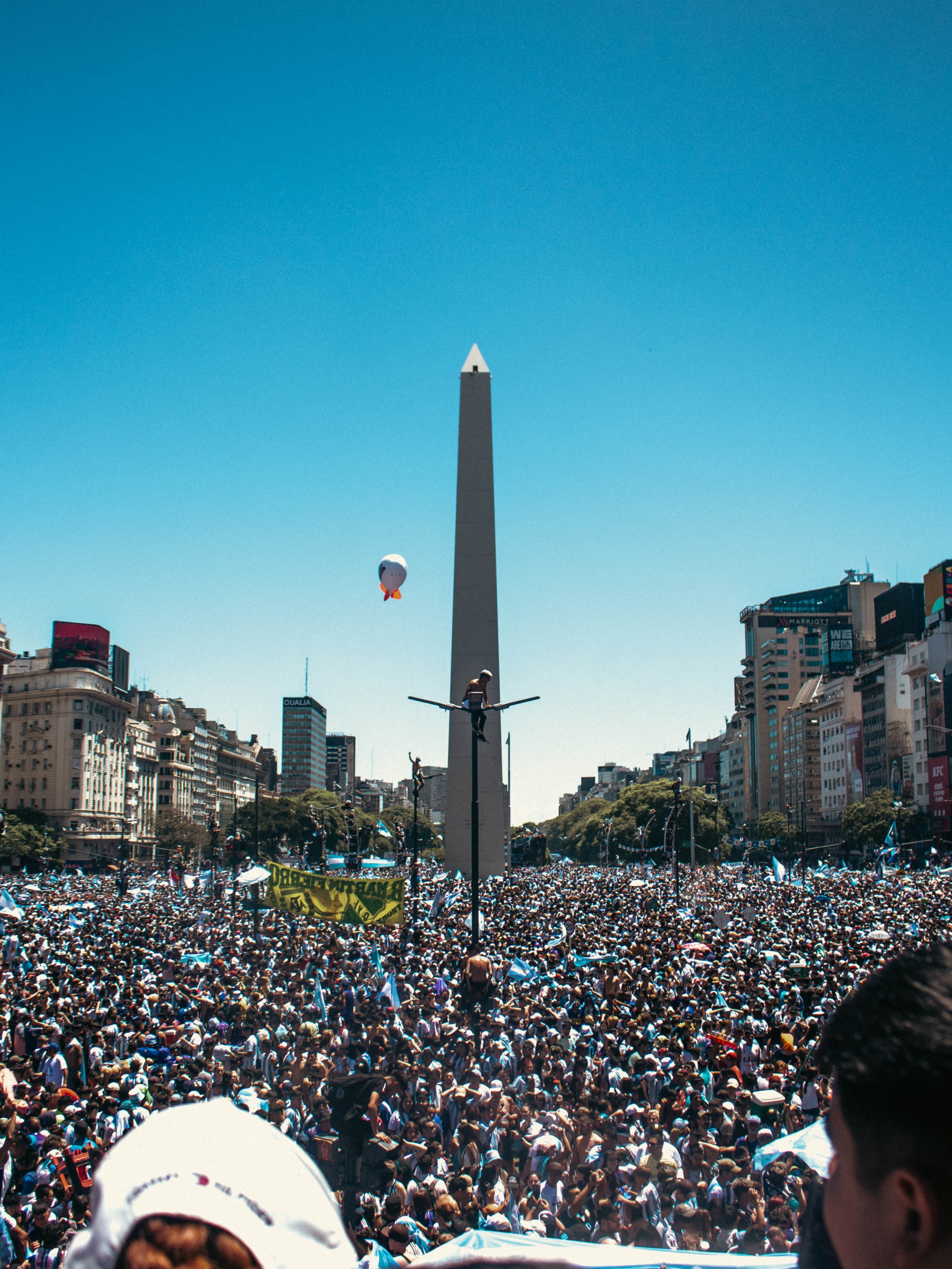
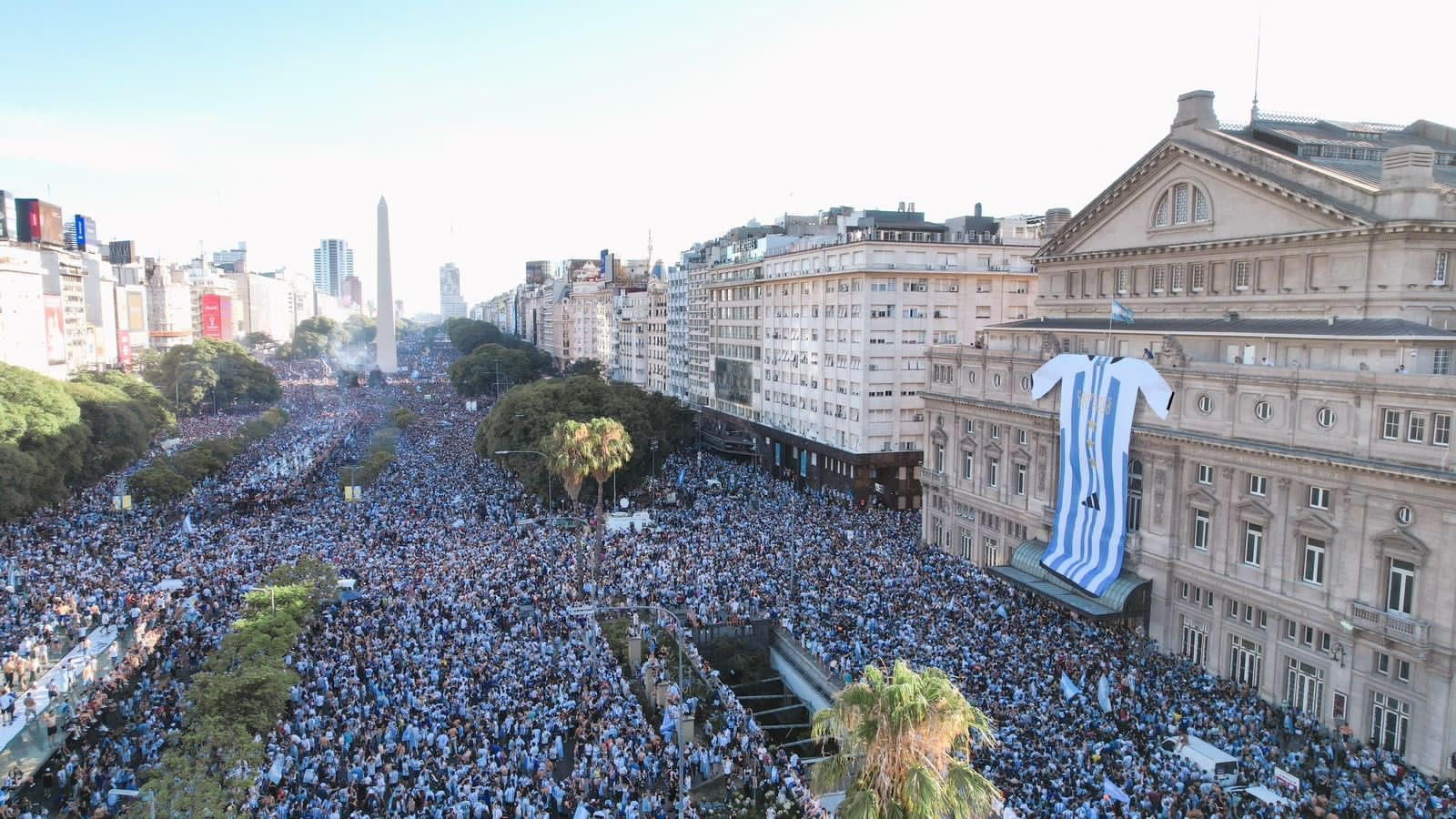
Celebrations near the Obelisco (top) and all along Avenida 9 de Julio (bottom), in the Argentine capital Buenos Aires, after the World Cup coronation

Messi was named as the player of the match and won his second Golden Ball award after 2014 as the best player of the tournament, becoming the first (and so far only) player to receive the award twice. He also won the Silver Boot award with the second-most goals at the tournament, seven. Messi's appearance in the final, his 26th World Cup game, meant he surpassed Lothar Matthäus as the player with the most appearances in the World Cup. With his goals, Messi became the second player to score in the round of 16, quarter-finals, semi-finals and final of a World Cup tournament, after Hungary's György Sárosi in 1938, and the only player to score in all of those knockout rounds as well as the group stage. Having scored once in the previous final, Mbappé's hat-trick made him the highest-scoring player in the final of the World Cup with four goals, surpassing the three of Hurst, Pelé, Vavá and Zinedine Zidane. In addition, with his three goals, he surpassed Messi to win the Golden Boot award as the top scorer of the tournament with eight goals, the most in a World Cup since Brazil's Ronaldo in 2002, and also was awarded the Silver Ball as the second-best player of the World Cup. Argentina's Emiliano Martínez won the Golden Glove award as the best goalkeeper of the tournament, while his teammate Enzo Fernández won the Young Player Award as the best player at the World Cup who is at most 21 (born on or after 1 January 2001).

In Argentina, celebrations erupted across the country, most notably in the capital Buenos Aires and in Rosario, Messi's hometown. On 20 December, the celebration in the streets of Buenos Aires after the arrival of the players of Argentina gathered a crowd estimated by local media at over four million people, forcing the team to be airlifted by helicopter out of their bus. On 22 December, the French Football Federation confirmed to have lodged a formal complaint against the Argentine goalkeeper Emiliano Martínez for unsporting behaviour which included incidents such as a sarcastic prayer for silence for French forward Kylian Mbappé in the Argentine locker room after the match, as well as being seen holding and laughing at a toy with a facial cut of Mbappé's face stuck to it during the Argentine victory parade. In France, riots erupted across the country in cities including Paris, Lyon and Nice; these were very similar to those after their victory in 2018, as well as after victories against England and Morocco earlier in the tournament. Some French players like Kingsley Coman, Randal Kolo Muani and Aurélien Tchouaméni were racially abused online due to their performances by their own fans. Within 48 hours of Messi posting, the Instagram post with the World Cup trophy had surpassed 75 million likes, and in doing so, it became the most-liked social media post ever across all social media platforms surpassing the previous most-liked Instagram post, the world record egg.

== See also ==
- Argentina at the FIFA World Cup
- France at the FIFA World Cup
- 2023 AFC Asian Cup final – held in the same venue more than a year later contested between Jordan and Qatar
- 2025 FIFA Arab Cup final – held in the same venue 3 years later contested between Jordan and Morocco
