= Lamia bint Majid Al Saud =

Saudi royal and philanthropist

Her Royal Highness Lamia bint Majid Al Saud
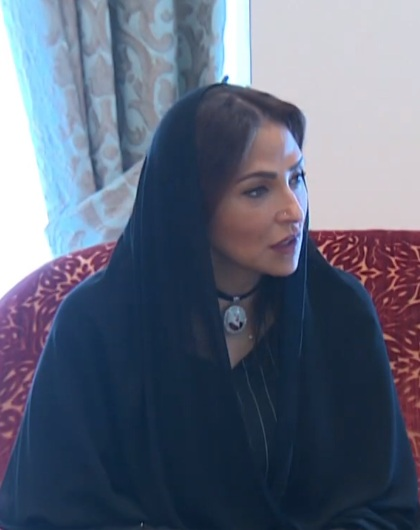
- Citizenship: Saudi Arabia
- Education: BA Public Relations, Advertising and Applied Communication. Minor in Journalism, Misr International University 1997-2002
- Occupation: Philanthropist
- Employer: Alwaleed Philanthropies
- Organization: United Nations
- Known for: Philanthropy and humanitarianism
- Title: Princess
- Family: Al Saud

Lamia bint Majid Al Saud (Arabic: لمياء بنت ماجد آل سعود) is a Saudi royal who is Secretary General of Alwaleed Philanthropies.

== Biography ==
Princess Lamia is the daughter of Prince Majed bin Saud, who is the son of King Saud bin Abdulaziz AlSaud. She graduated in 2001 with a BA in Public Relations & Marketing from Misr International University in Cairo. In 2003 she began a publishing company called Sada Al Arab, which published three magazines. In 2010 her novel, Children & Blood, was published which discussed honour killings and women's rights in the Middle East.

In 2016 she was appointed Secretary General of Alwaleed Philanthropies. She had previously held the role of Executive Manager of Media & Communications there.

In September 2019 she opened a new Islamic art department at the Louvre.

In 2020 she was appointed a UN-Habitat Goodwill Ambassador, with a brief to support "sustainable urbanisation".

== Awards ==
- Honorary medal from the Vice-President of Laos Phankham Viphavanh (2017)
- Achievement in Philanthropies Award - Arab Women of the Year (2017)
- Baden Powell Fellowship - World Scout Foundation (2018)
- Most influential figure - Arab Council for Social Responsibility (2021)
