= Samir Sarsare =

Moroccan footballer

Personal information
- Full name: Samir Sarsare
- Date of birth: June 19, 1975 (age 51)
- Place of birth: Youssoufia, Morocco
- Position: Forward

Team information
- Current team: Moghreb Tétouan

Youth career
- Kawkab Marrakech

Senior career*
| Years | Team | Apps | (Gls) |
| 1995–2001 | Kawkab Marrakech | | |
| 2001–2002 | Stade Tunisien | | |
| 2002–2003 | Kawkab Marrakech | | |
| 2003–2004 | Dibba Al-Hisn | | |
| 2004–2006 | Wydad Casablanca | | |
| 2006–2007 | Hassania Agadir | | |
| 2007– | Moghreb Tétouan | | |

International career^{‡}
| 2003–2004 | Morocco | 1 | (1) |
- * Club domestic league appearances and goals as of April 16, 2009 ‡ National team caps and goals as of October 17, 2008

Samir Sarsare is a Moroccan footballer. He usually plays as forward. Sarsare is currently attached to Moghreb Tétouan.
