= Merieme Chadid =

Moroccan astronomer and researcher (born 1969)

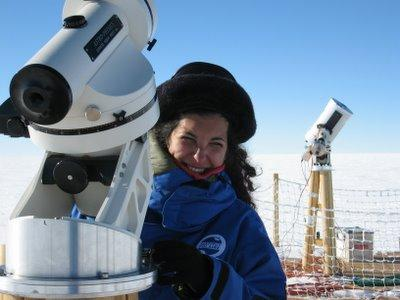
- Merieme Chadid in 2008
- Born: Merieme Chadid; 11 October 1969 (age 56); Casablanca, Morocco
- Education: University of Hassan II Casablanca; University of Nice; Paul Sabatier University; University of Nice Sophia Antipolis
- Known for: Installed astronomical observatory in Antarctica
- Awards: Young Global Leader at the World Economic Forum, 2008; Officer of the Order of Ouissam Alaouite, 2013; Young Leader of the France-China Foundation, 2014; Arab Woman of the Year Award, 2015; Woman of the Antarctic Wikibomb by Scientific Committee on Antarctic Research SCAR, 2016
- Scientific career
- Fields: Astronomy and Exploration
- Workplaces: Dome Charlie, Antarctica

Merieme Chadid (Arabic: مريم شديد; born 11 October 1969 in Casablanca) is a Moroccan-French astronomer, explorer and astrophysicist. She leads international polar scientific programs and has been committed to installing a major astronomical observatory at the heart of Antarctica.

== Education and early life ==
Chadid was born October 11, 1969, in Casablanca to a Moroccan family. Her father and mother were a blacksmith and a housewife respectively. She was one of seven children. At 12 years old, she discovered her love of astronomy from a Johannes Kepler book gifted to her by her brother. In 1992, Chadid graduated from the University of Hassan II Casablanca with a master's degree in Physics and Mathematics. In 1993, she graduated from the University of Nice Sophia Antipolis with a Master of Advanced Studies and three years later earned her PhD in Astronomy and Space from the Paul Sabatier University from her research detecting hypersonic shock waves in pulsating stars and explaining their origin. She also obtained the highest university qualification degree Habilitation HDR, a second PhD, at the University of Nice Sophia-Antipolis. Chadid completed several executive education programs at John F. Kennedy School of Government, Harvard University as well.

== Career ==
Merieme Chadid joined the Centre national de la recherche scientifique and then the European Southern Observatory soon after earning her PhD. She worked on European Southern Observatory for the installation of The Very Large Telescope, the largest telescope in the world at the time, in the Atacama Desert in northern Chile. She works as an astronomer in the French public university system.

Chadid is President of the International Astronomical Union Division G, Stars and Stellar Physics, having previously served as its Vice-President from 2021 to 2024 and as a steering committee member from 2018 to 2021.

Chadid became the first Moroccan as well as the first female French astronomer to reach the heart of Antarctica, and the first to plant an Arab and an African flag (the Moroccan flag) in Antarctica in 2005 when she achieved her first polar expedition to set up a new observatory. Of her many achievements, her most treasured accomplishment has been her work under extreme conditions in the heart of Antarctica. She is considered the world's first astronomer to be committed to installing the large astronomical observatory in Antarctica, where she carried out pioneering work. In interviews, she has compared the installation of the observatory to a space mission, an area characterized by only a thin layer of turbulence, making it easier to observe faraway objects than observatories in other parts of the world. As night continues for several months of the year, researchers at the Antarctica stations are able to study the stars 24/7.

Chadid promotes education by giving lectures, attending conferences, supervising students, and her documentary on astronomy, Tarik Annujah, has played on the Al Jazeera Children's Channel. Her most published research aims to understand and decipher early star formation and the stellar evolution and pulsation towards of understanding of the Universe.

She was listed by Forbes magazine as one of the thirty most interesting and fascinating workers in the world.

== Personal life ==
Merieme Chadid has been married to Jean Vernin, Director of Research of Centre National de Recherche Scientifique, since 31 March 2001; they have two children.

== Major achievements ==
- Young Global Leader at the World Economic Forum (2008)
- Arab Woman of the Year Award for Achievement in Science by Regent's University London (2015) (first group to be recognized)
- Officer of the Order of Ouissam Alaouite bestowed by His Majesty The King of Morocco in 2013

== See also ==
- Timeline of women in science
- Women astronomers
