= Farrah Eldibany =

Farrah El Dibany فرح الديباني
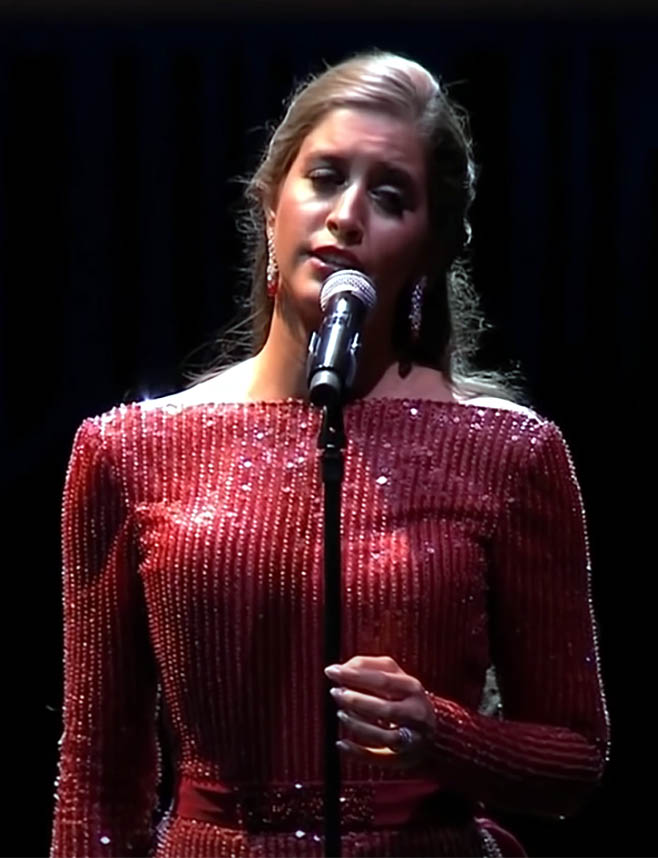
- El-Dibany in 2020

Background information
- Born: 12 February 1989 (age 37); Alexandria, Egypt
- Genres: mezzo soprano
- Years active: 2014–present

Farrah El-Dibany (Arabic: فرح الديباني) (born 12 February 1989) is an Egyptian mezzo-soprano. She is the first Egyptian and African singer to join the Paris Opera Academy in 2016.

In 2013, she was awarded 3rd Prize at the International Giulio Perotti Singing Competition and she sang the role of Cornelia in Handel's Giulio Cesare at the Cairo Opera House, and in 2022 she sang La Marseillaise, the French national anthem, as large crowds celebrated the re-election of President Emmanuel Macron at the Champ-de-Mars.

== Education ==
El-Dibany was born in Alexandria on 12 February 1989, into a family of music lovers, in which her grandfather, a physician, his hobby was playing the piano. She studied at Deutsche Schule der Borromäerinnen Alexandria from 1993 to 2007. In the meantime, she started voice lessons with Névine Allouba (fr) in 2003. In 2005, she entered the Arts Center of the Bibliotheca Alexandrina. Between 2007 and 2012, El-Dibany pursued the study of architecture at the Arab Academy for Science, Technology and Maritime Transport and Technische Universität Berlin, graduating with a Bachelor of Science. She then continued her music education and joined Júlia Várady's class at the Hochschule für Musik Hanns Eisler Berlin, where she obtained her Bachelor of Arts in Opera in 2014. She obtained her Master of Arts from the Berlin University of the Arts in 2016.

== Career ==
In 2015, she played an excerpt from Carmen at Neuköllner Oper in Berlin, which earned her a nickname, the "Egyptian Carmen". In September 2016, she joined the Paris Opera Academy to be the first Egyptian to do so.

In 2021, El-Dibany has been honored at the World Youth Forum by Egyptian president Abdel-Fattah El-Sisi and was the first ever to receive the prestigious Hassan Kamy Award at the Manial Palace Festival, presented by prince Abbas Helmy and renowned pianist Ramzy Yassa. In the same year, she was invited by the Institut du Monde Arabe to perform masterpieces by singers Asmahan, Fairuz and Dalida. On 12 November 2021, she performed Wehyat Albi by Abdel Halim Hafez during the 75th anniversary of UNESCO.

On 24 April 2022, she performed alone on stage the first verse and the chorus of La Marseillaise at the Champ de Mars, on the occasion of the re-election of Emmanuel Macron as president of the republic. On 18 December 2022, she sang La Marseillaise at the Lusail Stadium before the 2022 FIFA World Cup Final match between France and Argentina.

== Prizes ==
She won top awards from competitions in Athens, Rome, Thessaloniki, Istanbul and Berlin, most notably:

- 2007: First prize in the singing competition of the Egyptian Supreme Council of Culture
- 2008: Second prize in the Jugend musiziert competition
- 2013: Third prize in the Giulio-Perotti International Singing Competition
- 2017: Prize from Kammeroper Schloss Rheinsberg
- 2018: Prize from Wagner Foundation
- 2019: Prix Lyrique de l'AROP from the Paris Opera

== Awards ==
- Chevaliers of the Ordre des Arts et des Lettres, awarded by Marc Baréty, French Ambassador to Egypt in April 2022.

== See also ==
- EgyptAir Flight 181, a flight that Eldibany was on that was hijacked in 2016
