= Ola Al-Fares =

Jordanian journalist and TV presenter (born 1985)

Ola Al-Fares علا الفارس
- Born: November 6, 1985 (age 40); Amman, Jordan
- Education: Al-Ahliyya Amman University
- Occupations: Journalist, TV presenter
- Years active: 2004–present
- Employer: Al Jazeera
- Website: Ola Al-Fares's Twitter account

Ola Al-Fares (Arabic: علا الفارس, born November 6, 1985) is a Jordanian lawyer, journalist and television presenter who works at Al Jazeera. She is currently the second most followed Jordanian woman on Twitter after Queen Rania. Most known for presenting a TV show called MBC in a week by Middle East Broadcasting Center channel. She was also the first Arab woman to climb Burj Khalifa. She won the young TV presenter Arab woman of the year award on December 3, 2015. Ola Alfares was selected among the most 500 Influential Muslims in the world according to the Muslims 500 in 2019 edition.

Also, she won the prestigious social media award "Sheikh Mohammed Bin Rashid Award for humanitarian causes". She has used her social media to support many humanitarian initiatives to help the less fortunate people in life.

== Biography ==
Al-Fares was born in Amman, Jordan, on November 6, 1985, to a well-known political family. Her grandfather was Abdul Raouf Al Fares, a member of the Jordanian Parliament from 1954 until his death in 1984. Her father Tahsin Al-Fares was also a member of the Jordanian Parliament in 1985.

She graduated from high school at the age of 16. She later graduated from law school at Al-Ahliyya Amman University at the young age of 19. She started working as a reporter at the age of 17 and OK! British magazine described her as one of the youngest reporters in the Middle East. In 2004, she started working for Al Arabiya. Afterwards, she worked for MBC from 2007 until 2019. On 31 May 2019, Al-Fares declared that she was moving to Al Jazeera.

== Endorsements ==
Since 2016, she has been working as the brand ambassador for L'Oréal in the Middle East. Al Fares has been working as the brand ambassador for the Jordanian utility company Zain Jordan.

== Awards ==
- Young Arab Media Professionals Award (2009)
- Best Jordanian Media Award (2009)
- Creative Youth Shield (2010)
- Jordanian Model for Successful Youth (2011)
- Arab Woman of the Year (2015)
