= Youssoufia, Morocco =

Town in Marrakesh-Safi, Morocco

Coordinates: 32°15′N 8°32′W

Youssoufia: اليوسفية (Arabic); ⵢⵓⵙⵓⴼⵉⵢⴰ (Standard Moroccan Tamazight)
- Town
- Interactive map of Youssoufia
- Country: Morocco
- Region: Marrakesh-Safi
- Province: Youssoufia

Population (2014)
  - Total: 67,628
- Time zone: UTC+0 (GMT)

Youssoufia (Arabic: اليوسفية, romanized: al-Yūsufiyya; Standard Moroccan Tamazight: ⵢⵓⵙⵓⴼⵉⵢⴰ, romanized: Yusufiya) is the capital of Youssoufia Province in Marrakesh-Safi, Morocco. In the 2014 Moroccan census it recorded a population of 67,628, up from 64,518 ten years ago.

It is known for its phosphate production. The city was founded in 1931 by the French when they began to exploit the phosphate deposits of the Gantour basin.

== Notable people ==
- Ismahane Elouafi, Geneticist.
- Samir Sarsare, Football player.
