= Silatech =

Qatari youth employment organization

- Formation: 2008
- Type: Private
- Headquarters: Doha, Qatar
- Key people: Moza bint Nasser, founder Hassan Al Mulla, CEO
- Website: http://www.silatech.org

Silatech (Arabic: صلتك) is an organization based in Qatar, founded by Mozah bint Nasser. The current CEO of this organization is Mr. Hassan Al Mulla. Silatech means "your connection" in Arabic. The initiative seeks to create jobs and economic opportunities for young people in the Arab world, targeting 18- to 30-year-olds. By 2016 Silatech claimed to have helped 200,000 young Arabs to obtain jobs. The initiative’s model involves building partnerships with governments, private companies and NGOs.

== History ==
Silatech was launched at the United Nations Alliance of Civilizations Forum in January 2008 by Sheikha Mozah bint Nasser Al Missned, initially targeting six pilot countries: Bahrain, Morocco, Qatar, Syria, Tunisia and Yemen. The initiative’s $100 million seed capital was donated from the personal funds of Sheikha Mozah bint Nasser Al Missned and the former emir of Qatar, Sheikh Hamad bin Khalifa Al Thani. Operations began in 2009.

Founding partners of Silatech include Cisco, Gallup, and ImagineNations. Silatech seeks to harness the "youth bulge" in the Arab world and tackle youth unemployment - which is as high as 35% in some Arab countries - by promoting the economic empowerment of Arab youth.

Board of Trustees of Silatech are Her Highness Sheikha Moza bint Nasser (Chairperson of the Board of Trustees), Ms. Amal Bahwan, and Abdulla Mubarak Al Khalifa.

== Activities ==
In 2016, Silatech was active in 16 countries, running projects with partners in the areas of microfinance, career advice and employability, small and medium enterprises (SME) development, civic engagement and research and policy advocacy.

=== Employability ===
One of Silatech’s first partnerships was with Cisco to create a technology platform for ICT education and youth interaction with prospective employers. Together with Microsoft, Silatech has developed Ta3meel, a set of online training programs and curricula and an online portal that provides skills and employer connections, with the aim of reaching two million young people.

Meanwhile, another initiative, Tamheed, in collaboration with Mindmill, has created an online career guidance platform with psychometric testing, which has been used by young people in Qatar, Morocco, Palestine, Syria, Egypt, and the United Arab Emirates (UAE).

Partnering with Tunisiana, the main private telecommunications operator in Tunisia, Silatech launched e-mobile employment platform MobiWorks in 2013, reaching 300,000 Tunisians in less than a month, and offering mobile learning for entrepreneurship, career guidance and financial literacy.

Offline, Silatech has supported career counseling, for instance, partnering with the International Youth Foundation in 2012 to provide four days of career guidance training in the West Bank for participants from nine NGOs, universities and colleges in Palestine. Collaborating with Pearson Education’s Edexcel brand, Silatech developed an accredited course and new qualification (Silaqual) for construction industry training in Yemen. The project started in 2009 and at least 1,024 construction workers were trained in 2010.

=== Financial inclusion ===
The Consultative Group to Assist the Poor and Silatech hosted a workshop in Rabat on 12–13 March 2013 on youth financial inclusion in the region.

In June 2013, Silatech launched a youth savings initiative in Morocco with Al Barid Bank and GIZ called "Tawfir al-Ghad" (Saving for Tomorrow), with the aim of providing saving accounts and financial literacy training to 30,000 young people. This project was the expansion of a youth micro-savings pilot with Al Amal Microfinance Bank in Yemen, where 11,000 young people opened savings accounts for the first time between 2010 and 2013. The micro-savings project has also expanded to Egypt.

=== Microfinance ===
In August 2011, Silatech signed a Memorandum of Understanding to create a fund to support small and medium-sized enterprises, investing $10 million in the fund, with the General Authority for Investment in Egypt. Silatech and UNWRA announced ‘Mubaderati’ (Initiatives) in February 2012, providing a select group of entrepreneurs with financing to help begin their businesses. Silatech guarantees part of the loan, which reduces the risk for UNWRA and young Palestinian borrowers, thereby freeing up millions of dollars' worth of additional loans from UNWRA. A partnership with Attawfiq Microfinance in 2012 introduced "Boudour" (Seed), the first loan product specifically for youths in Morocco, which over 7,000 entrepreneurs had received by June 2013.

In 2012, Silatech and the micro-lending platform Kiva partnered to create Kiva Arab Youth, allowing people to make online loans of at least $25 to help fund microentrepreneurs under 30. Silatech matches loans made by the community - initially, this was up to $175,000, but has since been raised to $375,000. Through the Kiva Arab Youth project, $3 million was raised for 2,500 young people by April 2013.

In June 2013, Silatech announced it would collaborate with the international payments firm Dahabshiil and the American Red Cross to promote crowdfunding in Somalia using remittance payments.

In September 2013, Grameen-Jameel (a joint venture with the Grameen Foundation) joined with Silatech to enable new access to microfinance for young people in countries such as Libya.

By 2012, Silatech had raised $35 million of co-funding for microfinance initiatives, had 12 financial institution partners in five countries, and had helped to start or grow 15,000 youth-run businesses, making it the largest supporter of youth microfinance services in the Arab region.

=== SME investment ===
Silatech launched SILA, a network of angel investors to invest in early-stage businesses in Qatar, in partnership with Qatar Development Bank, Wamda, Oasis500 and the MIT Enterprise Forum in October 2012.

=== Competitions ===
The winners of the third annual Al Fikra Business Plan Competition were announced in April 2013, with winners receiving unspecified cash prizes, incubation, professional development and managerial and technical advice from Enterprise Qatar. The Al Fikra Business Plan Competition is managed by Enterprise Qatar, with Silatech and the SILA early-stage investment network as co-organizers. Silatech also supported the regional MIT Enterprise Forum Arab Business Plan competition held in April 2013.

In 2014, Silatech held the first Arab Mobile App Challenge in partnership with the Applied Innovation Institute and Ooredoo. Workshops were held in Jordan, Qatar, Saudi Arabia, Tunisia and the UAE in late 2013, followed by competitions in these countries in January 2014, with the top three entries from each country sent to the finals in Doha. The winners, who were announced on 2 February 2014, earned prizes of $50,000, $30,000 and $20,000, and one team from each country was selected to compete at the Mobile World Congress in Barcelona.

=== Conferences ===
Silatech has been active in organising conferences at national and regional levels. On 11–12 January 2012, Silatech brought 300 Libyan youth and government officials together in Benghazi to discuss youth empowerment, which resulted in the creation of the National Youth Leadership Council. On 16–18 February 2013, Silatech organized the Arab Youth and Entrepreneurship Conference in Qatar with The Arab Urban Development Institute and in partnership with the World Bank. The conference brought 300 people together to discuss the challenges facing young entrepreneurs and the ways in which local governments, NGOs and the private sector could come together to support young entrepreneurs. Silatech organized a conference on 16–17 October 2013 at UC Berkeley’s Fung Institute to bring figures from the Arab world together with scholars, venture capitalists, and Silicon Valley innovators. Silatech has also supported Global Entrepreneurship Week; in Qatar in November 2013, and the first ever such event in Libya also held in November 2013.

=== Research ===
In 2008, a collaboration between Silatech, FTSE Group and the Qatar Financial Markets Authority (QFMA) created a new index project, supporting individual exchanges across the Arab World to launch small and medium enterprises markets. Joining with the Wolfensohn Center for Development at the Brookings Institution, the Dubai School of Government and the Issam Fares Institute at the American University of Beirut, Silatech launched "Taqeem" in June 2009, a project to assess the impact of current policy and investment in the areas of employment and entrepreneurship, and to identify, scale and promote best practices.

Silatech collaborates with Gallup to investigate youth attitudes to employment and entrepreneurship across the region in the ‘Silatech Index.’ Since 2008, twice-yearly reports have sought to measure and quantify youth opinions in three areas: job creation and availability, access to resources required to find jobs, and policies blocking their success.

In 2012, Silatech collaborated with the Consultative Group to Assist the Poor and Sanabel to survey regional microfinance institutions, identifying gaps in youth financial inclusion and seeking to use the information to improve policy.

=== Civic engagement ===
In January 2014, Silatech and Innovations in Civic Partnership launched a program allowing universities in Egypt, Morocco, Palestine, Tunisia and Yemen to apply for grants assisting institutional change and improving civic engagement. In February 2014, Silatech and Innovations in Civic Partnership convened a forum in Amman, Jordan, for more than 40 university presidents and senior administrators to discuss integrating civic engagement into higher education.

== Organizational governance ==
Rick Little was CEO of Silatech from its founding in 2008, until July 2011. Tarik Yousef subsequently took over as CEO of Silatech.

Silatech’s current members of the board of trustees are Martti Ahtisaari, David Bell, Rick Little, Hessa Al Jaber, Nemir Kirdar, Ahmad Mohamed Ali Al-Madani and Mohammed Al Naimi, with Sheikha Mozah as chair.

In 2012, the Cisco CEO John Chambers was also a board member. In 2011, Mary Robinson, Nabil Kuzbari and Khaled Bin Mohammed Al-Attiyah were board members (along with the current board members Martti Ahtisaari, David Bell and Rick Little), when Ameera al-Taweel joined the board in April 2011. In 2009, John Chambers and Wim Elfrink of Cisco and Ratan Tata were also board members.

Board meetings have been held in Tunis on 17 January 2012, and in Rabat on 9 June 2013. The extent to which the board of directors is involved in decision-making and the governance of Silatech is unclear.

== Programmes ==
=== Youth Employment Initiative in Qatar, Al Amal Bil Amaal ===
The Youth Employment Initiative in Qatar, Al Amal Bil Amaal, was started by Silatech to help young men and women in Qatar get jobs. This project is based on the Qatar National Vision 2030, which tries to balance economic and social growth for all Qataris by investing in them and making sure that everyone gets care, attention, and justice. The goal of the program is to help residents of Qatar, especially those who are unemployed because of COVID-19 or don't have the skills they need to get a job in Qatar, learn new skills and become more financially independent.

=== Bedaya Center ===
Bedaya Center for Entrepreneurship and Career Development, a Silatech-Qatar Development Bank partnership, offers youth career guidance, self-assessment, employability skills development in employability and entrepreneurship, mentoring, volunteering, practical training, networking, and lecturers programs. Silatech's Employment and Enterprise Development programs collaborate with Bedaya to serve Qatari adolescents through the Bedaya Center.

=== Qatar Ta3mal Youth Employability Portal ===
Qatar Ta3mal is an online employment marketplace for Qatari youth and job seekers. Ta3mal, a Silatech-Microsoft initiative, offers career guidance tools like "Tamheed," e-learning courses, employability and entrepreneurship training, and entry-level job opportunities in the country. Silatech's career counseling product, Tamheed, incorporates online psychometric and linguistic evaluations, a career advising framework, and career advisor training and capacity building. In less than a week, youth workers can become Tamheed consultants, providing tailored scientific advice. Over 80% of Qatari college students have access to Tamheed through university and college partnerships.

=== TAMM Volunteer Network ===
"Tamm," meaning "consider it done" in Qatari Arabic, promotes youth volunteerism and civic involvement by linking volunteers with organizations that need them online. Silatech, Social Development Center, Reach Out to Asia, and Qatar Center for Voluntary Activities founded Tamm in early 2015.

=== Challenge 22 ===
Challenge 22 is a 2015 innovation award from the Supreme Committee for Delivery & Legacy, Silatech, and Qatar National Research Fund. Challenge 22 brings together, encourages, and challenges Middle Eastern and North African entrepreneurs, inventors, and scientists to exhibit their ideas to billions in 2022 and beyond.

=== GEM Report ===
Silatech, in collaboration with Qatar University's Social and Economic Survey Research Institute, conducted the inaugural Global Entrepreneurship Monitor (GEM) survey in Qatar. The survey aimed to gather data on the entrepreneurial attitudes, aspirations, and activities of both Qatari nationals and non-Qatari residents, ensuring a nationally representative sample.
