= Noura bint Faisal Al Saud =

Saudi royal and fashion designer (born 1988)

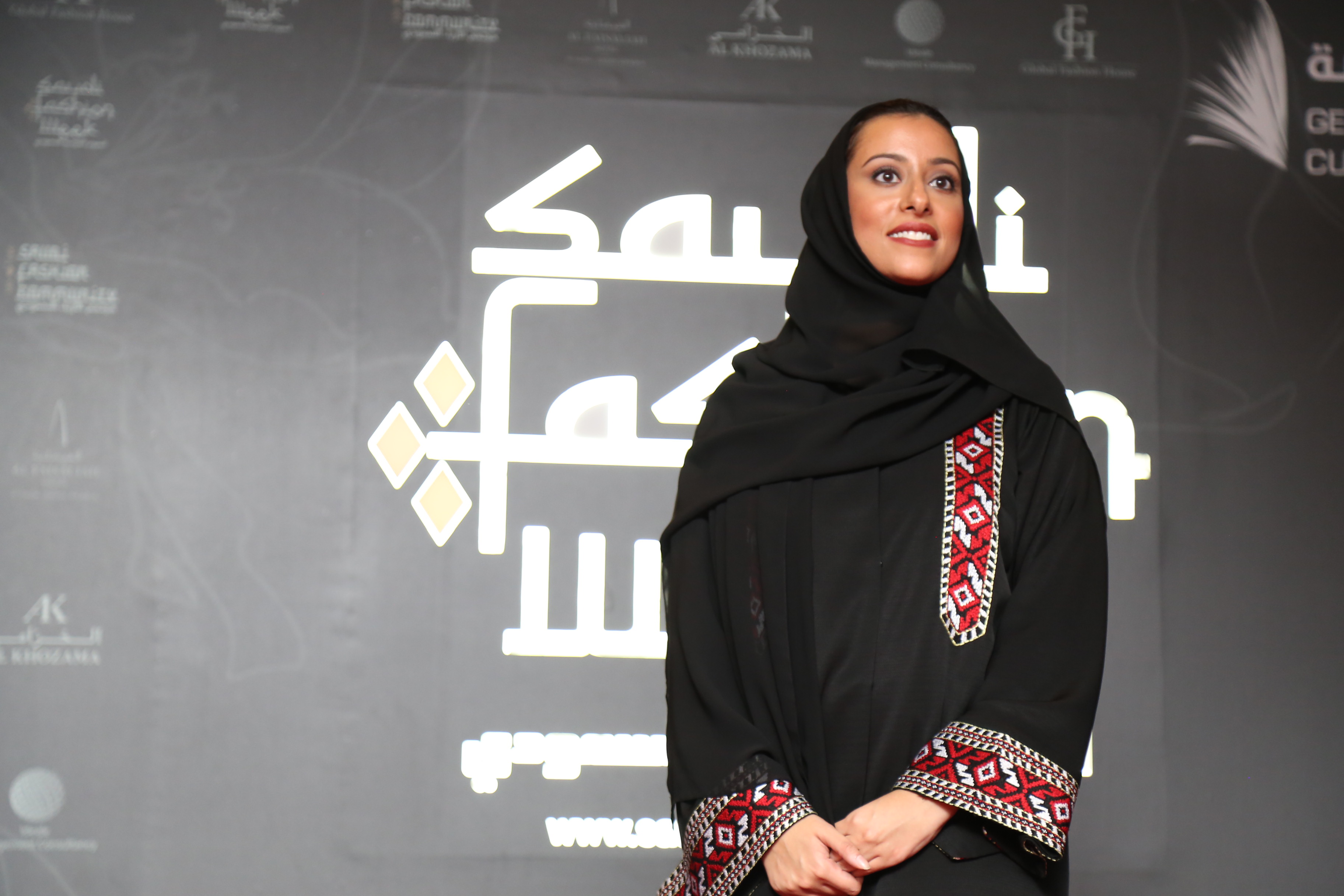
- Princess Noura bint Faisal bin Saud bin Mohammad Al Saud announcing the official 2018 Saudi Fashion Week in Riyadh
- Born: 1988 (age 37–38)
- House: House of Saud
- Education: Rikkyo University

Princess Noura bint Faisal Al Saud (born in 1988) is a Saudi Princess, businesswoman and member of the Saudi royal family. She is the founder of the Saudi Fashion Week.

== Biography ==
Noura bint Faisal is the great-granddaughter of King Abdulaziz, the founder of Saudi Arabia. She received a master's degree from Rikkyo University in Tokyo in international business. She announced the launch of the first official Saudi Fashion Week under the patronage of the General Culture Authority.
