= Alwaleed Philanthropies =

Saudi Arabian philanthropic organization

- Founded: 1980
- Founder: Al Waleed bin Talal Al Saud
- Type: Charitable and humanitarian foundation
- Purpose: Education, humanitarian, orphanage, poverty
- Location(s): Saudi Arabia and Middle East
- Region served: Global
- Method: Donations and grants
- Secretary General: Lamia bint Majed Al Saud
- Website: Official website
- Formerly called: Al Waleed bin Talal Humanitarian Foundation

Alwaleed Philanthropies (formerly "The Al Waleed bin Talal Foundation") is a charitable and philanthropic organization founded by Al-Waleed bin Talal, a Saudi billionaire businessman, and of the ruling House of Saud. The foundation has established centers and programs in higher education institutions around the world.

== History ==
Alwaleed Philanthropies was founded as the Al Waleed bin Talal Humanitarian Foundation in 1980.

The organization has funded academic centers and Islamic culture educational initiatives at universities such as Georgetown University, the University of Edinburgh, the University of Cambridge, and the American University in Cairo.

== Leadership ==
In 2016, Princess Lamia bint Majed Al Saud was appointed Secretary General of Alwaleed Philanthropies. She is also a member of the board of trustees and previously served as the organization's Executive Manager of Media and Communication.
