= FieldTurf =

Brand of artificial turf used for athletic playing fields

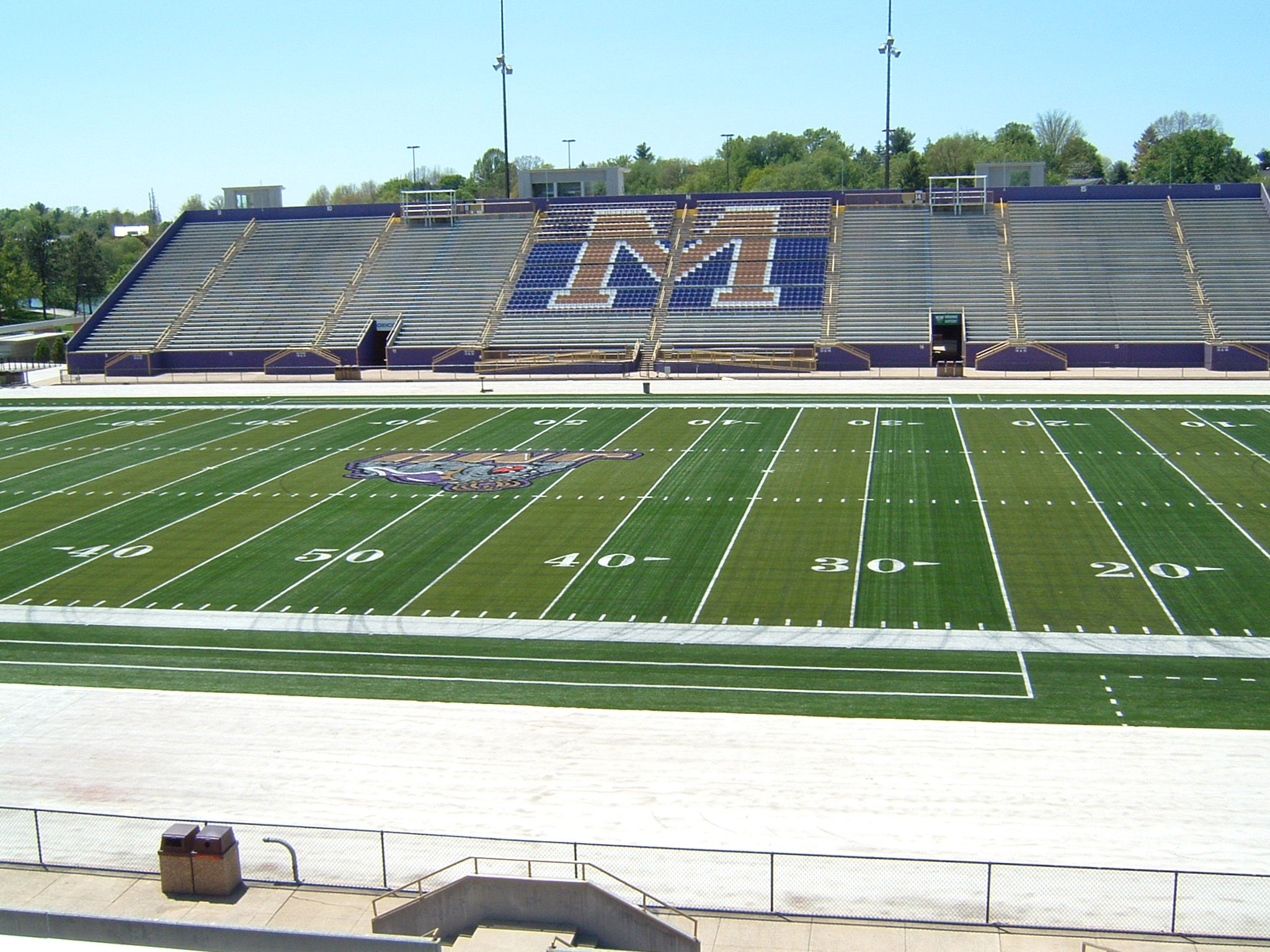
- FieldTurf at Bridgeforth Stadium at James Madison University on May 7, 2007
- Product type: Artificial turf
- Current owner: Tarkett
- Introduced: 1988; 38 years ago
- Related brands: AstroTurf; Poly-Turf
- Website: fieldturf.com

FieldTurf is a Canadian brand of artificial turf playing surface. It is manufactured and installed by FieldTurf Tarkett, a division of French company Tarkett. FieldTurf is headquartered in Montreal, Quebec, Canada, and its primary manufacturing facility is located in Calhoun, Georgia, United States. With a design intended to more accurately replicate real grass, the new product rapidly gained popularity in the late 1990s.

== History ==
Jean Prévost bought the patent of the FieldTurf product in 1988, and originally named his Montreal-based company SynTenni Co., a name which would eventually be dropped in favour of FieldTurf Inc. In 1995, John Gilman, a former Canadian Football League player and coach, joined FieldTurf as CEO.

In 1997, FieldTurf made its first major installation for a professional team, at the training facility for the English Premiership's Middlesbrough F.C. As of 2012, FieldTurf has installed over 7000 athletic fields.

In 2005, French flooring manufacturer and minority shareholder Tarkett increased its share in FieldTurf, which led to the integration of the two companies. FieldTurf is a part of the Tarkett Sports division of the holding company Tarkett SA.

In May 2010, FieldTurf acquired the American company EasyTurf of San Diego, California, as a way to gain entry into the rapidly growing residential and commercial synthetic grass markets in the United States.

== Product details ==
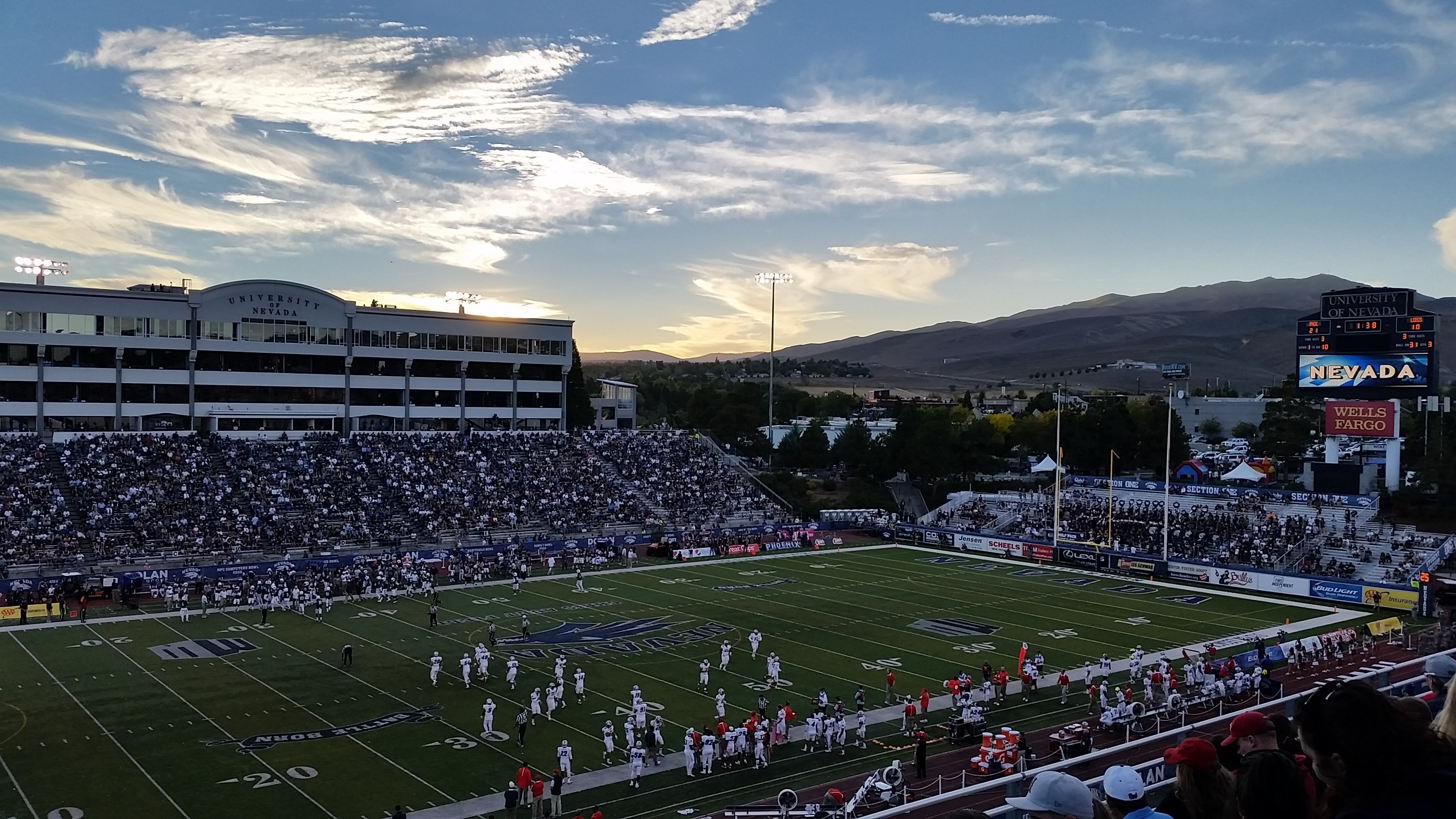
FieldTurf at Mackay Stadium the University of Nevada, Reno, at a view from the upper southeast corner during the game vs. New Mexico on October 10, 2015

The surface is composed of monofilament polyethylene-blend fibres tufted into a polypropylene backing. The infill is composed of a bottom layer of silica sand, a middle layer which is a mixture of sand and cryogenic rubber, and a top layer of only rubber. The fibres are meant to replicate blades of grass, while the infill acts as a cushion. This cushion is intended to improve safety when compared to earlier artificial surfaces and allows players to plant and pivot as if they were playing on a grass field.

Each square foot of turf contains about 3 kg (7 lb) of sand and 1.5 kg (3 lb) of cryogenic rubber. FieldTurf does not use shock-absorbency pads below its infill. The backing of the turf is a combination of woven and nonwoven polypropylene. These materials are permeable and allow water to drain through the backing itself.

== Safety ==
Some evidence shows higher player injury on artificial turf. In a study performed by the National Football League Injury and Safety Panel, published in the October 2012 issue of the American Journal of Sports Medicine, Elliott B. Hershman et al. reviewed injury data from NFL games played between 2000 and 2009. They wrote, "...the injury rate of knee sprains as a whole was 22% higher on FieldTurf than on natural grass. While MCL sprains did not occur at a rate significantly higher than on grass, rates of ACL sprains were 67% higher on FieldTurf."

Studies of the safety of FieldTurf are conflicting. A five-year study funded by FieldTurf and published in the American Journal of Sports Medicine found that injury rates for high-school sports were similar on natural grass and synthetic turf. However, notable differences in the types of injuries were found. Athletes playing on synthetic turf sustained more skin injuries and muscle strains, while those who played on natural grass were more susceptible to concussions and ligament tears. In 2010, another FieldTurf-funded but peer-reviewed study was published in the American Journal of Sports Medicine, this time on NCAA Division I-A football, concluding that in many cases, games played on FieldTurf-branded products led to fewer injuries than those played on natural grass. However, the NFL's Injury and Safety Panel presented a study finding that anterior cruciate ligament (ACL) injuries happened 88% more often in games played on FieldTurf than in games played on grass. In 2012, the Injury and Safety Panel published an independently funded analysis of actual game data over the 2000–2009 seasons. Their statistically significant findings showed a 67% higher rate of ACL sprains and 31% higher rate of eversion ankle sprains.

== Uses ==
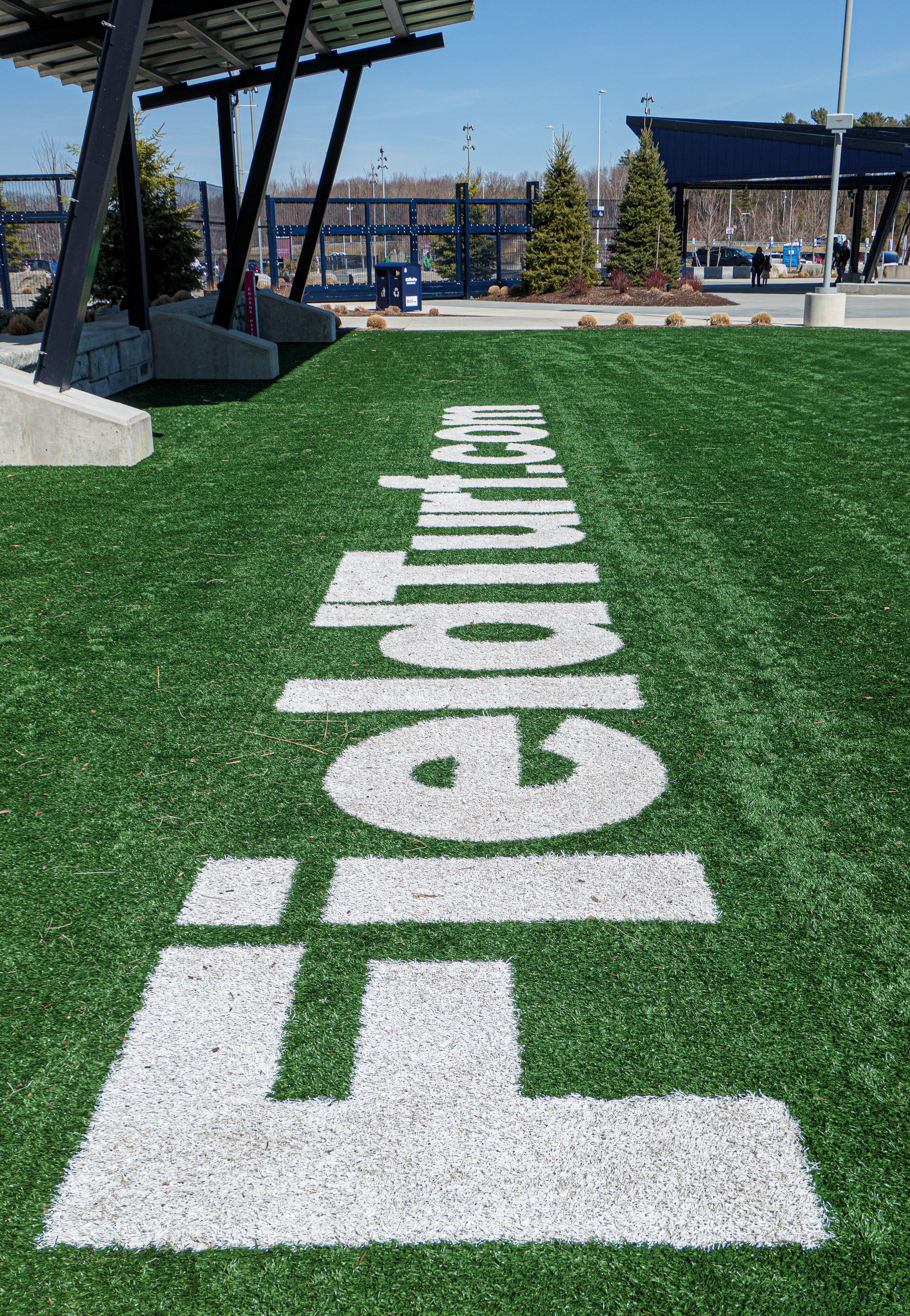
FieldTurf promotion at Patriot Place

=== Gridiron football ===
The first installation of FieldTurf in the United States took place at Dick Bivins Stadium in Amarillo, Texas (which was the home field for the Amarillo Independent School District's football teams) in 1998. The first major college football installation was at Nebraska's Memorial Stadium in 1999. The following year, it was installed at the two Pac-10 stadiums: Martin Stadium in Pullman, Washington and Husky Stadium in Seattle. The first installation in an NFL (and by extension, professional) stadium was in 2002, at the Seattle Seahawks' new stadium, known as Lumen Field. Originally planned to have a natural grass field, the Seahawks instead decided to install FieldTurf after they had played the two previous seasons in Husky Stadium on that surface, and to ease conversion and footing concerns for a future Major League Soccer team in the venue, which has been shared with Seattle Sounders FC since 2009 (natural grass is brought in and installed over the FieldTurf for FIFA-sanctioned events).

=== Association football ===
FieldTurf's first high-profile installation came in January 1997 as English club Middlesbrough chose FieldTurf for its new training field. Only artificial fields with FIFA-recommended 2-star status can be used in FIFA and UEFA Finals competitions. Other FIFA and UEFA competitions require at least 1-star status.

In 2001, Boston University's FieldTurf soccer field became FieldTurf's first to obtain FIFA 1-star status. In 2005, Saprissa Stadium in San José, Costa Rica became the first stadium to host a FIFA World Cup qualifying match on FieldTurf. The Dundalk F.C. Stadium, Oriel Park, received FieldTurf's first FIFA 2-star rating. FieldTurf has 29 FIFA-recommended 1-Star installations and 31 FIFA Recommended 2-Star installations as of 2009. In 2007, the FIFA U-20 World Cup Canada had almost 50% of its games played on FieldTurf.

==== Major League Soccer ====
The use of FieldTurf in Major League Soccer (MLS) has received criticism, especially from the league's international roster players used to playing on natural grass overseas in their home domestic leagues and FIFA competitions.

The installation of the surface at CenturyLink Field in Seattle was approved as mentioned above when the state stadium authority which operates the venue agreed to bring in a natural grass surface for FIFA-sanctioned events.

In September 2006, several top Canadian soccer players appealed to the Canadian Soccer Association to install a natural grass surface at BMO Field in Toronto. The club removed the FieldTurf playing surface and switched to a traditional grass surface starting in 2010.

Following David Beckham's move to Major League Soccer in 2007, he voiced his opinion that the league should convert to grass for all pitches. In an apology, he stated that the surface is fine at lower levels, but that his feelings had not changed about the MLS use because of the toll the harder surface takes on the body. Thierry Henry opted out of road matches in Seattle when he played for the New York Red Bulls specifically because of the Sounders' use of FieldTurf in that venue.

=== Public works ===
A specialized version of FieldTurf called Air FieldTurf has been installed to cover the edges of runways at several airports.

== See also ==
- AstroTurf
- Poly-Turf
