= List of FIFA World Cup final stadiums =

There have been 22 editions of the FIFA World Cup which is an international association football tournament established in 1930. It is contested by the men's national teams which are members of FIFA, the sport's global governing body. The tournament has taken place every four years since its inauguration, apart from 1942 and 1946 due to World War II. The last tournament was hosted in United, Mexico and Canada which was won by Spain in 2026.

The World Cup final match is the last of the competition, and the result determines which country is declared world champions. If after 90 minutes of regular play the score is a draw, an additional 30-minute period of play, called extra time, is added. If such a game is still tied after extra time, it is then decided by a penalty shoot-out. The team winning the penalty shoot-out are then declared champions. The tournament has been decided by a one-off match on every occasion except 1950, when the tournament winner was decided by a final round-robin group contested by four teams (Uruguay, Brazil, Sweden, and Spain). Uruguay's 2–1 victory over Brazil was the decisive match (and one of the last two matches of the tournament) that put them ahead on points and ensured that they finished top of the group as world champions. Therefore, this match is regarded by FIFA as the de facto final of the 1950 World Cup.

Each final is hosted at usually the host nation's largest stadium, as the final attracts the largest crowds and the most attention. Two stadiums have hosted multiple finals, these being the Estadio Azteca in Mexico City, Mexico and the Maracanã Stadium in Rio de Janeiro, Brazil. Alongside those two cities, Rome, Italy has also hosted multiple finals. These were held at the Stadio Nazionale PNF and the Stadio Olimpico. Île-de-France has also hosted two finals, them being at the Stade Olympique de Colombes in Colombes and the Stade de France in Saint-Denis.

== List of stadiums ==
Locations of FIFA World Cup finals

Past venues
Image	Stadium	Location	Final(s) hosted
	Estadio Centenario	Montevideo, Uruguay	1930 FIFA World Cup final (Uruguay 4–2 Argentina)
	Stadio Nazionale PNF	Rome, Italy	1934 FIFA World Cup final (Italy 2–1 Czechoslovakia)
	Stade Yves-du-Manoir	Colombes (Paris), France	1938 FIFA World Cup final (Italy 4–2 Hungary)
	Maracanã Stadium	Rio de Janeiro, Brazil	1950 FIFA World Cup decisive match (Uruguay 2–1 Brazil) 2014 FIFA World Cup final (Germany 1–0 Argentina)
	Wankdorf Stadium	Bern, Switzerland	1954 FIFA World Cup final (West Germany 3–2 Hungary)
	Råsunda Stadium	Solna (Stockholm), Sweden	1958 FIFA World Cup final (Brazil 5–2 Sweden)
	Estadio Nacional	Santiago, Chile	1962 FIFA World Cup final (Brazil 3–1 Czechoslovakia)
	Wembley Stadium	London, England	1966 FIFA World Cup final (England 4–2 West Germany)
	Estadio Azteca	Mexico City, Mexico	1970 FIFA World Cup final (Brazil 4–1 Italy) 1986 FIFA World Cup final (Argentina 3–2 West Germany)
	Olympiastadion	Munich, West Germany	1974 FIFA World Cup final (West Germany 2–1 Netherlands)
	Estadio Monumental	Buenos Aires, Argentina	1978 FIFA World Cup final (Argentina 3–1 Netherlands)
	Santiago Bernabéu Stadium	Madrid, Spain	1982 FIFA World Cup final (Italy 3–1 West Germany)
	Stadio Olimpico	Rome, Italy	1990 FIFA World Cup final (West Germany 1–0 Argentina)
	Rose Bowl	Pasadena (Los Angeles), California, United States	1994 FIFA World Cup final (Brazil 0–0 [3–2 pso] Italy)
	Stade de France	Saint-Denis (Paris), France	1998 FIFA World Cup final (France 3–0 Brazil)
	International Stadium	Yokohama, Japan	2002 FIFA World Cup final (Brazil 2–0 Germany)
	Olympiastadion	Berlin, Germany	2006 FIFA World Cup final (Italy 1–1 [5–3 pso] France)
	Soccer City	Johannesburg, South Africa	2010 FIFA World Cup final (Spain 1–0 Netherlands)
	Luzhniki Stadium	Moscow, Russia	2018 FIFA World Cup final (France 4–2 Croatia)
	Lusail Stadium	Lusail, Qatar	2022 FIFA World Cup final (Argentina 3–3 [4–2 pso] France)
	New York/New Jersey Stadium	East Rutherford (New York/New Jersey), New Jersey, United States	2026 FIFA World Cup final (Spain 1–0 Argentina)

== See also ==
- List of FIFA World Cup stadiums
- List of FIFA World Cup finals
