= Tarkett d.o.o. =

Serbian manufacture company

Tarkett
- Native name: Таркет
- Company type: d.o.o.
- Industry: Manufacturing
- Predecessor: Tarkett-Sintelon
- Founded: 26 April 2002; 24 years ago
- Headquarters: Industrijska zona bb, Bačka Palanka, Serbia
- Area served: Worldwide
- Key people: Miroslav Okuka (Director)
- Products: Floor coverings, flooring
- Revenue: ▲€534.99 million (2017)
- Net income: ▲€31.95 million (2017)
- Total assets: ▲€296.13 million (2017)
- Total equity: ▲€160.67 million (2017)
- Owner: Tarkett (100%)
- Number of employees: 3,363 (2017)
- Subsidiaries: Subsidiaries
- Website: tarkett.rs

Tarkett (full name: Tarkett d.o.o. Bačka Palanka) is a Serbian manufacture company with the headquarters in Bačka Palanka, Serbia. It is owned by the French company Tarkett, and it is specialized in floor coverings and flooring production. It is one of the most profitable companies and biggest exporter companies of Serbia.

== History ==
On 26 April 2002, one month after the signing of the agreement between the Swedish-French joint venture Tarkett Sommer and domestic company Sintelon, a joint-venture company Tarkett-Sintelon was founded. In November 2005, the company opened a new flooring factory worth 15 million euros.

In November 2006, Tarkett bought 21.1 percent of shares for 44.9 million euros, becoming majority owner with 64.3 percent of shares. In 2007, Tarkett invested to open a new plant worth 10 million euros which would eventually double the production from 2008.

In July 2009, Tarkett bought 34.99 percent of shares in the company for 117 million euros. By 2009, Tarkett has increased the stake in ownership structure up to more than 99 percent, forcing purchase of the remaining shares from minor shareholders.

As of January 2018, apart from Serbia, Tarkett d.o.o. has its representative offices in Hungary, Russia, Belarus and Kazakhstan.

== Activities ==
The company produces laminate flooring, vinyl, linoleum and flooring. In addition to flooring for households, it produces the floors for professionally and sporting purposes.

== Market and financial data ==
According to the 2016 consolidated annual financial report submitted to the Serbian Economic Registry Agency, the company has 3,242 employees and posted an annual profit of €30.97 million for the calendar year of 2016.

Since 2004, Tarkett is one of the biggest exporters in Serbia. It was the biggest Serbian exporter for the calendar year 2011.

== Subsidiaries ==
This is a list of Tarkett d.o.o. subsidiary companies:

- Sintelon RS d.o.o.
- Sintelon d.o.o.
- Tarkett SEE
- Tarkett UA Ukraine
- Tarkett Vinisin Ukraine
- Tarkett Kaz Kazakhstan
- Tarkett a.o. Russia
- Tarkett Rus Zao Russia
- Tarkett Sommer Russia
- Tarkett Bel Belarus
- Tarkett KFT Hungary
