= List of FIFA World Cup finals =

FIFA World Cup final
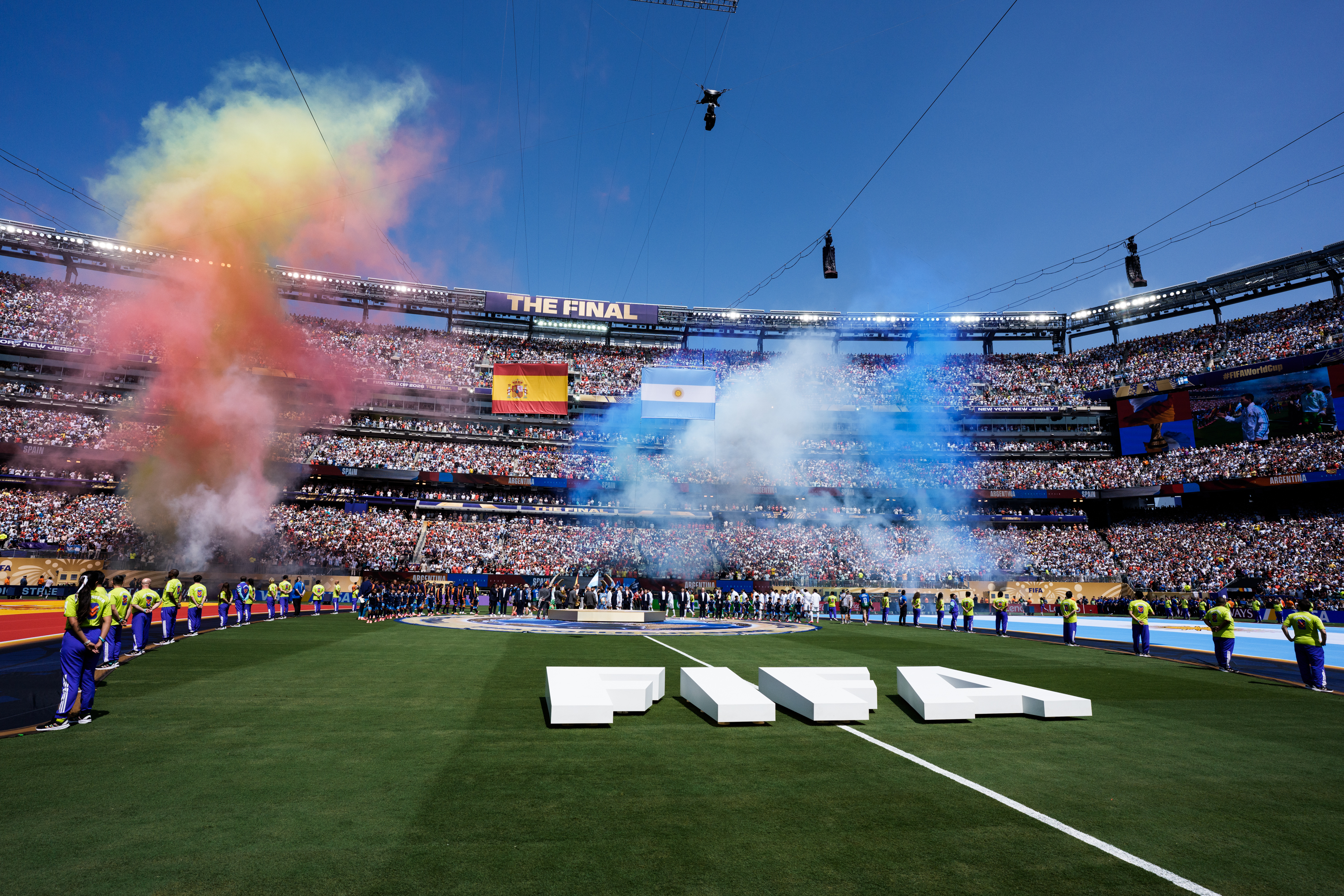
- The pre-match ceremonies of the 2026 final in the United States
- Founded: 1930; 96 years ago
- Current champions: Spain (2nd title)
- Most championships: Brazil (5 titles)

The FIFA World Cup is an international association football competition contested by the senior men's national teams of the Fédération Internationale de Football Association (FIFA), the sport's global governing body. The championship has been awarded every four years since 1930, except in 1942 and 1946, when it was not held because of World War II.

The World Cup final is the last match of the competition, played by the only two teams remaining in contention, and the result determines which country is declared the world champion. It is a one-off match decided in regulation time. In case of a draw, extra time is used. If scores are then still level, a penalty shoot-out determines the winner, under the rules in force since 1986; prior to that, finals still tied after extra time would have been replayed, (Note: The 1962 and 1966 finals had provisions for only a single replay, and then a drawing of lots. For knockout matches other than the finals, penalty shoot-outs had been adopted from 1978, while lots would have been drawn between 1962 and 1974.) though this never proved necessary. The golden goal rule would have applied during extra time in 1998 and 2002, but was not put in practice either. The only exception to this type of format was the 1950 World Cup, which featured a final round-robin group of four teams; the decisive match of that group is often regarded as the de facto final of that tournament, including by FIFA itself.

The team that wins the final receives the FIFA World Cup Trophy, and its name is engraved on the bottom side of the trophy. Of 84 nations that have appeared in the tournament, 13 have made it to the final, and 8 have won. Brazil, the only team that has participated in every World Cup, is also the most successful team in the competition, having won five titles and finished second twice. Italy and Germany (Note: The team's totals include the records of West Germany (1954–1990).) have four titles each, with Germany having reached more finals than any other team, eight. Argentina has won three titles, Uruguay, France and Spain have two each, and England has one. Czechoslovakia, Hungary, Sweden, the Netherlands and Croatia have played in the final without winning. Only teams from Europe (UEFA) and South America (CONMEBOL) have ever competed in the final. Spain defeated Argentina in the latest final, staged at the United States' MetLife Stadium in 2026.

== List of final matches ==
Locations of finals held in Europe	Locations of finals held in the rest of the world

Key to the list
†	Match went to extra time
*	Match was won on a penalty shoot-out

List of FIFA World Cup finals
Year	Winners	Score	Runners-up	Venue	Location	Attendance	Ref.
1930	Uruguay	4–2	Argentina	Estadio Centenario	Montevideo, Uruguay	68,346	
1934	Italy	2–1†	Czechoslovakia	Stadio Nazionale PNF	Rome, Italy	55,000	
1938	Italy	4–2	Hungary	Stade Olympique de Colombes	Colombes, France	45,000	
1950	Uruguay	2–1 (Note: Decisive match of a final stage; technically not a final but often regarded as such.)	Brazil	Maracanã Stadium	Rio de Janeiro, Brazil	173,850	
1954	West Germany	3–2	Hungary	Wankdorf Stadium	Bern, Switzerland	62,500	
1958	Brazil	5–2	Sweden	Råsunda Stadium	Solna, Sweden	49,737	
1962	Brazil	3–1	Czechoslovakia	Estadio Nacional	Santiago, Chile	68,679	
1966	England	4–2†	West Germany	Wembley Stadium	London, England	96,924	
1970	Brazil	4–1	Italy	Estadio Azteca	Mexico City, Mexico	107,412	
1974	West Germany	2–1	Netherlands	Olympiastadion	Munich, West Germany	78,200	
1978	Argentina	3–1†	Netherlands	Estadio Monumental	Buenos Aires, Argentina	71,483	
1982	Italy	3–1	West Germany	Santiago Bernabéu	Madrid, Spain	90,000	
1986	Argentina	3–2	West Germany	Estadio Azteca	Mexico City, Mexico	114,600	
1990	West Germany	1–0	Argentina	Stadio Olimpico	Rome, Italy	73,603	
1994	Brazil	0–0* (Note: Brazil won 3–2 on penalties after extra time.)	Italy	Rose Bowl	Pasadena, California, United States	94,194	
1998	France	3–0	Brazil	Stade de France	Saint-Denis, Seine-Saint-Denis, France	80,000	
2002	Brazil	2–0	Germany	International Stadium	Yokohama, Japan	69,029	
2006	Italy	1–1* (Note: Italy won 5–3 on penalties after extra time.)	France	Olympiastadion	Berlin, Germany	69,000	
2010	Spain	1–0†	Netherlands	Soccer City	Johannesburg, South Africa	84,490	
2014	Germany	1–0†	Argentina	Maracanã Stadium	Rio de Janeiro, Brazil	74,738	
2018	France	4–2	Croatia	Luzhniki Stadium	Moscow, Russia	78,011	
2022	Argentina	3–3* (Note: Argentina won 4–2 on penalties after extra time.)	France	Lusail Stadium	Lusail, Qatar	88,966	
2026	Spain	1–0†	Argentina	MetLife Stadium	East Rutherford, New Jersey, United States	80,663	

== Results ==
Map of winning countries

Results by nation
Team	Winners	Runners-up	Total finals	Years won	Years runners-up
Brazil	5	2	7	1958, 1962, 1970, 1994, 2002	1950, 1998
Germany	4	4	8	1954, 1974, 1990, 2014	1966, 1982, 1986, 2002
Italy	4	2	6	1934, 1938, 1982, 2006	1970, 1994
Argentina	3	4	7	1978, 1986, 2022	1930, 1990, 2014, 2026
France	2	2	4	1998, 2018	2006, 2022
Uruguay	2	0	2	1930, 1950	—
Spain	2	0	2	2010, 2026	—
England	1	0	1	1966	—
Netherlands	0	3	3	—	1974, 1978, 2010
Czechoslovakia	0	2	2	—	1934, 1962
Hungary	0	2	2	—	1938, 1954
Sweden	0	1	1	—	1958
Croatia	0	1	1	—	2018

Results by confederation
Confederation	Appearances	Winners	Runners-up
UEFA	30	13	17
CONMEBOL	16	10	6

== See also ==
- List of FIFA World Cup final goalscorers
- List of FIFA Confederations Cup finals
- List of FIFA World Cup final stadiums
- List of FIFA Club World Cup finals
