= Tarkett =

French multinational corporation

Tarkett S.A.
- Type: Public
- Traded as: Euronext Paris: TKTT; CAC All-Share
- Industry: Building and surface coverings manufacturing
- Predecessors: Sommer-Allibert; Tarkett AG
- Founded: October 3, 1997; 29 years ago
- Headquarters: La Défense, France
- Key people: Eric de la Bonnardière (chairman); Fabrice Barthélemy (CEO)
- Revenue: ▲€3.332 billion (2024)
- Operating income: ▲€36.2 million (2024)
- Net income: ▼€−62.6 million (2024)
- Total assets: ▲€2,484.9 billion (2024)
- Total equity: ▲€820.9 million (2024)
- Number of employees: 12,000
- Parent: Société Investissement Deconinck
- Website: www.tarkett-group.com/en/

Tarkett S.A., known until 2008 as Sommer-Allibert S.A., is a French multinational corporation specialising in the production of floor and wall coverings. Headquartered in La Défense, near Paris, the present company was formed in October 1997 by the merging of two others: French Sommer-Allibert and German Tarkett AG. These companies were in turn formed by the combination of various smaller companies in Sweden, Germany and France. The name Tarkett came from a product developed by a Swedish predecessor.

== History ==
=== Sommer-Allibert ===
In 1972 Allibert, a company established in 1913 which had developed into plastic products for the automotive and housing industries, and Sommer, a company established in 1880 which specialised in floor and wall coverings, were merged to form Sommer-Allibert. The merging was designed by then-Allibert CEO Bernard Deconinck, which became the leader of Sommer-Allibert. The Nanterre-based company was expanded on the next years, mostly through the acquisition of smaller rivals. The group's automotive business, while a core revenue generator, was mainly centred on France. The floor and wall covering business (especially PVC coverings) expanded through Europe, North America and Asia, including a joint venture with American manufacturer Rubbermaid between 1989 and 1992. In 1989, Deconinck became the chief of a holding (owned by the Deconinck family) with a significant share of Sommer-Allibert and the day-to-day management was transferred to Mark Assa.

In the 1990s the company tried to strengthen its automotive division, increasing its business volume with manufacturers like Volkswagen, BMW, Ford, Nissan, Peugeot, and Saab. It also expanded its automotive parts manufacturing facilities in Europe and the United States.

=== Tarkett AG ===
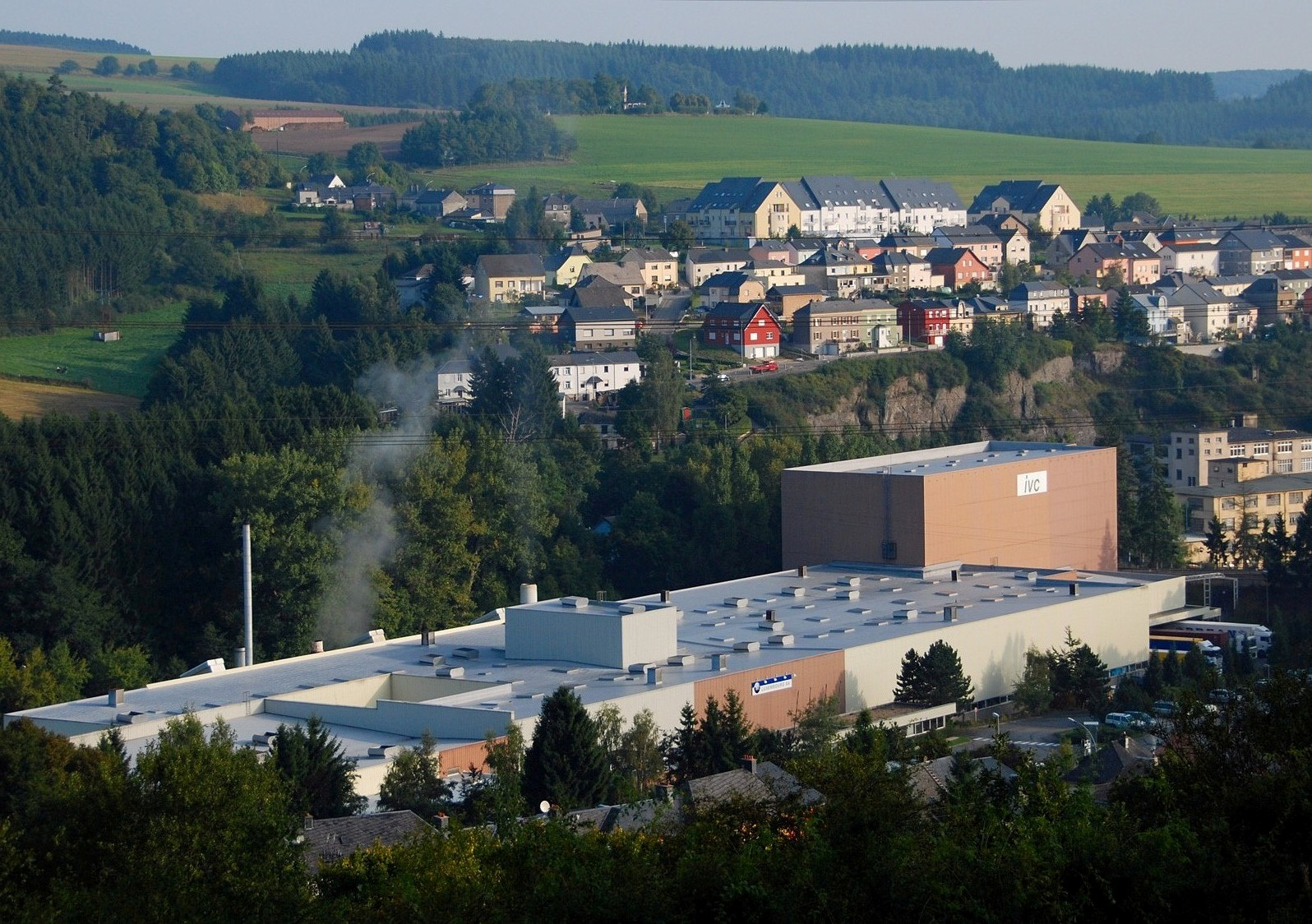
Former Tarkett AG factory in Luxembourg.

In 1885, Anders Martensson opened a woodworking facility for furniture in Malmö, Sweden. In 1886, it became a company known as Malmö Woodworking Factory (AB Malmö Snickerifabrik). In 1889, investor R.F. Berg took control and introduced wood flooring production, especially parquetry, opening a second facility in Limhamn. In 1907, Berg died and was replaced by Ernst Wehtje. After various setbacks, Wehtje sold off most minor operations of the company and, by the 1920s, refocused it almost exclusively on the wood flooring industry, renaming it as Limhamns Snickerifabrik. In 1925, the company was renamed again as Limhamns Golvindustri AB, under the leadership of Hugo Wehtje. Production was moved from Limhamn to Liljeholmen. In 1938, the company introduced the Lindemann board (a ready-to-use parquet board), which was larger and therefore cheaper to install than parquet's previous small boards. During the following years, the company acquired rivals on the Swedish market, entered into the laminated floorboards business and, in 1946, introduced a plastic replacement for wood covering, known as Tarkett, which became a sales success. Under the next leader, Urban Wehtje, the company started to develop an international network and diversified its production of wood and plastic coverings for building interiors. By the 1960s, the Wehtjes sold a significant percentage of the company's stake and, in 1967, it was listed on the Swedish stock exchange as Tarkett.

In 1970, Tarkett was acquired by Svenska Tändsticks AB (in turn acquired by Stora in the 1980s) and in 1978 it was merged with carpeting manufacturer Aneplas. The company continued its expansion in Europe and North America. In the late 1980s, then-CEO Lars Wisén decided to merge it with German rival Pegulan, and the headquarters were moved from Sweden to Frankenthal, Germany. The new company resulting from the merger was named Tarkett-Pegulan (later Tarkett AG) and Wisén became the CEO of the combined operations. In 1994, Stora sold the company to the investment firms CWB Capital Partners and Goldman Sachs Investment Bank.

Tarkett former headquarters in Nanterre, France

=== Merging of Sommer-Allibert and Tarkett AG ===
In the late 1990s, Wisén met Assa and convinced him of transferring the interior covering division of Sommer-Allibert to Tarkett AG. In exchange, Wisén would secure Sommer-Allibert taking control of at least 50% of Tarkett AG shares from the stockholders. The two parts agreed on the deal and it was announced by June 1997. Sommer-Allibert secured over 60% of Tarkett AG (owned since then by Tarkett Sommer AG) in October of that year. The combined operation was listed on both the Paris (through Sommer-Allibert S.A.) and Frankfurt (through Tarkett AG) stock exchanges. Wisén continued managing Tarkett Sommer AG–Sommer-Allibert interior coverings business from Germany, but he was fired in 1998 and the control was passed to the French headquarters. In 2000, Sommer-Allibert divested its automotive division, selling it to Faurecia. Faurecia also acquired the remaining listed shares of Sommer-Allibert, which was delisted. In April 2002, Tarkett-Sommer founded a joint-venture company with the Serbian manufacture company Sintelon, named Takett-Sintelon.

In 2003, all company operations started to use the trading name Tarkett. In 2004, the company's Tarkett Sports division formed an alliance with the Canada-based synthetic turf manufacturer FieldTurf before taking control of it in 2005. In 2006, Tarkett AG was wholly acquired by Sommer-Allibert and also delisted from the stock exchange. In 2007, the investment firm KKR became co-owner together with the Deconinck family. In 2008, Sommer-Allibert renamed itself as Tarkett S.A. In 2013, the company was relisted through an IPO, with KKR selling a 25% of its stake while the Deconincks kept over a half of the shares. In 2015, the headquarters were moved from Nanterre to the Tour Initiale in La Défense.

Tour Initiale Paris La Défense, Tarkett Headquarters

In June 2013, Fiberfloor products achieved Asthma and Allergy Friendly Certification.

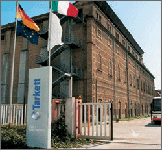
Tarkett facilities in Narni, Italy.

== Activities ==
Tarkett's main activity is producing flooring coverings for houses, schools, healthcare facilities, retail and hospitality facilities, and sports venues. The company has 35 industrial sites and a market presence in over 100 countries. Brands used by the company include the namesake Tarkett, Sommer, and others.

== Ownership ==
The company's shareholder structure at 31/12/2024 is as follows:

Concert Tarkett Participation*: 90.4%

Free float: 9.6%

*Tarkett participation, Société Investissement Deconinck, Expansion 17 S.C.A. and Global Performance 17 S.CA. (the latter two being part of the Wendel group) and the members of the company's supervisory board linked to the Deconinck family have been acting in concert since the simplified tender offer for Tarkett shares implemented in 2021.
