= List of FIFA World Cup stadiums =

Football stadiums

This article is regarding the stadiums used for FIFA World Cup.

== Stadium requirements ==
FIFA has had strict stadium guideline requirements since at least 2001. Stadiums must have a capacity of at least 40,000, stadiums hosting quarter-finals or semi-finals must have a minimum of 60,000 and those hosting the opening ceremony or final must have a capacity of at least 80,000. In addition, stadiums must have a minimum number of television camera stands and media areas and also be free of advertising throughout the World Cup. This includes stadium names – for instance, during the 2006 World Cup, German stadiums such as Allianz Arena were renamed "FIFA World Cup Stadium – Munich" for licensing reasons.

== Statistics ==
- Most matches hosted: Estadio Azteca (24 – 10 matches in 1970, 9 matches in 1986 and 5 matches in 2026)
- Most opening matches hosted: Estadio Azteca (3 – 1970, 1986 and 2026)
- Most finals hosted: Estadio Azteca (2 – 1970 and 1986), Maracanã Stadium (2 – 1950 (final match of final group stage) and 2014)
- Highest attendance: Maracanã Stadium (173,850 – final match in 1950)

Year	Host	Cities	Stadiums
1930	Uruguay	1	3
1934	Italy	8	8
1938	France	10	10 (Note: 11 stadiums in 11 cities were planned, but the only match in Lyon was cancelled after Austria withdrew.)
1950	Brazil	6	6
1954	Switzerland	6	6
1958	Sweden	12	12
1962	Chile	4	4
1966	England	7	8
1970	Mexico	5	5
1974	West Germany	9	9
1978	Argentina	5	6
1982	Spain	14	17
1986	Mexico	11	12
1990	Italy	12	12
1994	United States	9	9
1998	France	10	10
2002	South Korea; Japan	20	20 (Note: 10 stadiums in 10 cities in South Korea, 10 stadiums in 10 cities in Japan.)
2006	Germany	12	12
2010	South Africa	9	10
2014	Brazil	12	12
2018	Russia	11	12
2022	Qatar	5	8
2026	United States; Mexico; Canada	16	16 (Note: 11 stadiums in 11 cities in the United States, 3 stadiums in 3 cities in Mexico, 2 stadiums in 2 cities in Canada.)
2030 (Note: Future event, changes may occur.)	Morocco; Portugal; Spain	20	23 (Note: 6 stadiums in 6 cities in Morocco, 3 stadiums in 2 cities in Portugal, 11 stadiums in 9 cities in Spain, plus 3 "centenary matches", 1 each in Uruguay, Argentina and Paraguay.)

== Stadiums by tournament ==
=== 1930 ===
All 1930 FIFA World Cup matches took place in Montevideo. Three stadiums were used: Estadio Centenario, Estadio Pocitos, and Estadio Parque Central. The Estadio Centenario was built both for the tournament and as a celebration of the centenary of Uruguayan independence. Designed by Juan Scasso, it was the primary stadium for the tournament, referred to by Rimet as a "temple of football". With a capacity of 90,000, it was the largest football stadium outside the British Isles. The stadium hosted 10 of the 18 matches, including both semi-finals and the final. However, a rushed construction schedule and delays caused by the rainy season meant the Centenario was not ready for use until five days into the tournament. Early matches were played at smaller stadiums usually used by Montevideo football clubs Nacional and Peñarol, the 20,000 capacity Parque Central and the Pocitos.

List of FIFA World Cup stadiums (Uruguay)	Montevideo		
List of FIFA World Cup stadiums (Uruguay)	Estadio Centenario	Estadio Gran Parque Central	Estadio Pocitos
List of FIFA World Cup stadiums (Uruguay)	34°53′40.38″S 56°9′10.08″W	34°54′4″S 56°9′32″W	34°54′18.378″S 56°9′22.42″W
List of FIFA World Cup stadiums (Uruguay)	Capacity: 90,000	Capacity: 20,000	Capacity: 1,000

=== 1934 ===
During the 1934 FIFA World Cup the number of supporters travelling from other countries was higher than at any previous football tournament, including 7,000 from the Netherlands and 10,000 each from Austria and Switzerland.

List of FIFA World Cup stadiums is located in Italy	Milan	Bologna	Rome	Florence
List of FIFA World Cup stadiums is located in Italy	Stadio San Siro	Stadio Littoriale	Stadio Nazionale PNF	Stadio Giovanni Berta
List of FIFA World Cup stadiums is located in Italy	Capacity: 55,000	Capacity: 50,100	Capacity: 47,300	Capacity: 47,290
List of FIFA World Cup stadiums is located in Italy	Naples	Genoa	Turin	Trieste
List of FIFA World Cup stadiums is located in Italy	Stadio Giorgio Ascarelli	Stadio Luigi Ferraris	Stadio Benito Mussolini	Stadio Littorio
List of FIFA World Cup stadiums is located in Italy	Capacity: 40,000	Capacity: 36,703	Capacity: 28,140	Capacity: 8,000

=== 1938 ===
Ten cities were planned to host the 1938 FIFA World Cup tournament; of these, all hosted matches except Lyon, which did not due to Austria's withdrawal.

List of FIFA World Cup stadiums (France)	Colombes (suburbs of Paris)		Paris	Marseille
List of FIFA World Cup stadiums (France)	Stade Olympique de Colombes		Parc des Princes	Stade Vélodrome
List of FIFA World Cup stadiums (France)	Capacity: 60,000		Capacity: 48,712	Capacity: 48,000
List of FIFA World Cup stadiums (France)	Lyon	Toulouse	Bordeaux	Strasbourg
List of FIFA World Cup stadiums (France)	Stade Gerland (only match cancelled)	Stade du T.O.E.C. (in the old Parc des Sports), initially planned to the new stadium again in building (in the new Parc des Sports)	Parc Lescure	Stade de la Meinau
List of FIFA World Cup stadiums (France)	Capacity: 40,500	Capacity: 15,000	Capacity: 34,694	Capacity: 30,000
List of FIFA World Cup stadiums (France)	Le Havre	Reims	Lille	Antibes
List of FIFA World Cup stadiums (France)	Stade Municipal	Vélodrome Municipal	Stade Victor Boucquey	Stade du Fort Carré
List of FIFA World Cup stadiums (France)	Capacity: 22,000	Capacity: 21,684	Capacity: 15,000	Capacity: 7,000

=== 1950 ===
Six venues in six cities around Brazil hosted the 22 matches played for the 1950 FIFA World Cup. The Maracanã in the then-capital of Rio de Janeiro hosted eight matches, including all but one of the host's matches, including the Maracanazo match in the second round robin group that decided the winners of the tournament. The Pacaembu stadium in São Paulo hosted six matches; these two stadiums in São Paulo and Rio were the only venues that hosted the second round robin matches. The Estádio Sete de Setembro in Belo Horizonte hosted three matches, the Durival de Britto stadium in Curitiba and the Eucaliptos stadium in Porto Alegre each hosted two matches, and the Ilha do Retiro stadium in far-away Recife only hosted one match.

List of FIFA World Cup stadiums (Brazil)	Rio de Janeiro	São Paulo	Belo Horizonte
List of FIFA World Cup stadiums (Brazil)	Estádio do Maracanã	Estádio do Pacaembu	Estádio Sete de Setembro
List of FIFA World Cup stadiums (Brazil)	22°54′43.8″S 43°13′48.59″W	23°32′55.1″S 46°39′54.4″W	19°54′30″S 43°55′4″W
List of FIFA World Cup stadiums (Brazil)	Capacity: 96,000	Capacity: 60,000	Capacity: 30,000
List of FIFA World Cup stadiums (Brazil)	Curitiba	Porto Alegre	Recife
List of FIFA World Cup stadiums (Brazil)	Estádio Durival de Britto	Estádio dos Eucaliptos	Estádio Ilha do Retiro
List of FIFA World Cup stadiums (Brazil)	25°26′22″S 49°15′21″W	30°3′42″S 51°13′38″W	8°3′46.63″S 34°54′10.73″W
List of FIFA World Cup stadiums (Brazil)	Capacity: 10,000	Capacity: 20,000	Capacity: 20,000

=== 1954 ===
Six venues in six cities (1 venue in each city) hosted the 1954 FIFA World Cup tournament's 26 matches. The most used stadium was the St. Jakob stadium in Basel, which hosted 6 matches. The venues in Bern, Zurich and Lausanne each hosted 5 matches, the venue in Geneva hosted 4 matches and the venue in Lugano only hosted 1 match.

Bern	Basel	Lausanne
Wankdorf Stadium (upgraded)	St. Jakob Stadium	Stade Olympique de la Pontaise (upgraded)
46°57′46″N 7°27′54″E	47°32′29″N 7°37′12″E	46°32′00″N 006°37′27″E
Capacity: 64,600	Capacity: 54,800	Capacity: 50,300
Geneva	Lugano	Zürich
Charmilles Stadium	Cornaredo Stadium	Hardturm Stadium
46.2091°N 6.1182°E	46°01′25″N 8°57′42″E	47°23′35″N 8°30′17″E
Capacity: 35,997	Capacity: 35,800	Capacity: 34,800

=== 1958 ===
A total of twelve cities throughout the central and southern parts of Sweden hosted the 1958 FIFA World Cup tournament. FIFA regulations required at least six stadiums to have a capacity of at least 20,000. If Denmark had qualified, the organisers had planned to use the Idrætsparken in Copenhagen for Denmark's group matches. The Idrætsparken was renovated in 1956 with this in mind, but Denmark lost out to England in qualification. When doubts arose about whether funding would be forthcoming for rebuilding the Ullevi and Malmö Stadion, the organisers considered stadiums in Copenhagen and Oslo as contingency measures.

The Råsunda Stadium was expanded from 38,000 for the World Cup by building end stands. Organising committee chairman Holger Bergérus mortgaged his house to pay for this. The new Malmö Stadion was built for the World Cup, replacing the 1896 Malmö Stadion at a new site The Idrottsparken had 4,709 seats added for the World Cup. The Social Democratic municipal government refused to pay for this until the organisers threatened to select Folkungavallen in Linköping instead. At the Rimnersvallen, a stand from the smaller Oddevallen stadium was moved to Rimnersvallen for the World Cup. The crowd at Brazil v. Austria was estimated at 21,000, with more looking in from the adjoining hillside. The most used stadium was the Råsunda Stadium in Stockholm, which hosted 8 matches including the final, followed by the Ullevi Stadium in Gothenburg (the biggest stadium used during the tournament), which hosted 7 matches.

List of FIFA World Cup stadiums is located in Southern Sweden	Solna (Stockholm)	Gothenburg	Malmö	Helsingborg
List of FIFA World Cup stadiums is located in Southern Sweden	Råsunda Stadium	Ullevi Stadium	Malmö Stadion	Olympia
List of FIFA World Cup stadiums is located in Southern Sweden	Capacity: 52,400	Capacity: 53,500	Capacity: 30,000	Capacity: 27,000
List of FIFA World Cup stadiums is located in Southern Sweden	Eskilstuna	Norrköping	Sandviken	Uddevalla
List of FIFA World Cup stadiums is located in Southern Sweden	Tunavallen	Idrottsparken	Jernvallen	Rimnersvallen
List of FIFA World Cup stadiums is located in Southern Sweden	Capacity: 20,000	Capacity: 20,000	Capacity: 20,000	Capacity: 17,778
List of FIFA World Cup stadiums is located in Southern Sweden	Borås	Halmstad	Örebro	Västerås
List of FIFA World Cup stadiums is located in Southern Sweden	Ryavallen	Örjans Vall	Eyravallen	Arosvallen
List of FIFA World Cup stadiums is located in Southern Sweden	Capacity: 15,000	Capacity: 15,000	Capacity: 13,000	Capacity: 10,000

=== 1962 ===
Originally, eight stadiums were selected to host the World Cup matches in eight cities: Santiago, Viña del Mar, Rancagua, Arica, Talca, Concepción, Talcahuano and Valdivia.

The Valdivia earthquake, the most powerful earthquake ever recorded, occurred on 22 May 1960. With over 50,000 casualties and more than 2 million people affected, the earthquake forced the organising committee to completely modify the World Cup's calendar. Talca, Concepción, Talcahuano and Valdivia were severely damaged and discarded as venues. Antofagasta and Valparaíso declined to host any matches as their venues were not financially self-sustainable. Viña del Mar and Arica managed to rebuild their stadiums while Braden Copper Company, then an American company that controlled the El Teniente copper mine, allowed the use of its stadium in Rancagua. The most used stadium was the Estadio Nacional in Santiago, with 10 matches; the Estadio Sausalito in Viña del Mar hosted 8 matches, and the stadiums in Rancagua and far-away Arica (the only location that was not close to the other cities) both hosted 7 matches.

Being largely concerned with the build-up of the country after the 1960 earthquake, government support for the tournament was minimal.

List of FIFA World Cup stadiums (Chile)	Santiago	Viña del Mar
List of FIFA World Cup stadiums (Chile)	Estadio Nacional	Estadio Sausalito
List of FIFA World Cup stadiums (Chile)	33°27′52″S 70°36′38″W	33°00′51.83″S 71°32′6.84″W
List of FIFA World Cup stadiums (Chile)	Capacity: 66,660	Capacity: 18,037
List of FIFA World Cup stadiums (Chile)	Rancagua	Arica
List of FIFA World Cup stadiums (Chile)	Estadio Braden Copper Co.	Estadio Carlos Dittborn
List of FIFA World Cup stadiums (Chile)	34°10′39.95″S 70°44′15.79″W	18°29′15.47″S 70°17′56.96″W
List of FIFA World Cup stadiums (Chile)	Capacity: 18,000	Capacity: 17,786

=== 1966 ===
Eight venues were used for this World Cup. The newest and biggest venue used was Wembley Stadium in west London, which was 43 years old in 1966. As was often the case in the World Cup, group matches were played in two venues in close proximity to each other. Group 1 matches (which included the hosts) were all played in London: five at Wembley, which was England's national stadium and was considered to be the most important football venue in the world; and one at White City Stadium in west London, which was used as a temporary replacement for nearby Wembley. The group stage match between Uruguay and France played at White City Stadium (originally built for the 1908 Summer Olympics) was scheduled for a Friday, the same day as regularly scheduled greyhound racing at Wembley. Because Wembley's owner refused to cancel this, the game had to be moved to the alternative venue in London. Group 2's matches were played at Hillsborough Stadium in Sheffield and Villa Park in Birmingham; Group 3's matches were played at Old Trafford in Manchester and Goodison Park in Liverpool; and Group 4's matches were played at Ayresome Park in Middlesbrough and Roker Park in Sunderland.

The most used venue was Wembley, which was used for nine matches, including all six featuring England, the final and the match for third place. Goodison Park was used for five matches, Roker Park and Hillsborough both hosted four, while Old Trafford, Villa Park and Ayresome Park each hosted three matches and did not host any knockout round matches.

List of FIFA World Cup stadiums is located in England	London		Manchester	Birmingham
List of FIFA World Cup stadiums is located in England	Wembley Stadium	White City Stadium	Old Trafford	Villa Park
List of FIFA World Cup stadiums is located in England	Capacity: 98,600	Capacity: 76,567	Capacity: 58,000	Capacity: 52,000
List of FIFA World Cup stadiums is located in England	Sheffield	Sunderland	Middlesbrough	Liverpool
List of FIFA World Cup stadiums is located in England	Hillsborough Stadium	Roker Park	Ayresome Park	Goodison Park
List of FIFA World Cup stadiums is located in England	Capacity: 42,730	Capacity: 40,310	Capacity: 40,000	Capacity: 50,151

=== 1970 ===
Five stadiums in five cities were selected to host the World Cup matches. Alternative venues in Hidalgo state and the port city of Veracruz were also considered. Each group was based solely in one city with exception of Group 2, which was staged in both Puebla and Toluca. Aside from the Estadio Luis Dosal, all the stadiums had only been constructed during the 1960s, as Mexico prepared to host both the World Cup and the 1968 Summer Olympics.

The altitude of the venues varied and the importance of acclimatisation was strongly considered by all the participating teams. As a result, in contrast to the previous tournament staged in England, most teams arrived in the region well in advance of their opening fixtures to prepare for this factor. Some teams had already experienced the local conditions when competing in the football competition at 1968 Summer Olympics. At an elevation in excess of 2,660 metres (8,730 ft) above sea level, Toluca was the highest of the venues; Guadalajara was the lowest at 1,500 m (4,920 ft).

Of the five stadiums used for the 32 matches played, the largest and most used venue was the Azteca Stadium in Mexico City; which hosted ten total matches including the final and match for third place, and all of Group 1's matches (which included all of host Mexico's matches). The Jalisco Stadium in Guadalajara hosted eight matches including all of Group 3's matches and a semi-final. The Nou Camp Stadium in Leon hosted seven matches, which consisted of all of Group 4's matches and a quarter-final match. The Luis Dosal stadium in Toluca hosted four matches, and Cuauhtémoc stadium in Puebla hosted three matches and was the only stadium of the five used for this tournament not to host any knockout rounds.

List of FIFA World Cup stadiums (Mexico)	Mexico City		Guadalajara
List of FIFA World Cup stadiums (Mexico)	Estadio Azteca		Estadio Jalisco
List of FIFA World Cup stadiums (Mexico)	Capacity: 107,247		Capacity: 71,100
List of FIFA World Cup stadiums (Mexico)	Puebla	Toluca	León
List of FIFA World Cup stadiums (Mexico)	Estadio Cuauhtémoc	Estadio Luis Dosal	Estadio Nou Camp
List of FIFA World Cup stadiums (Mexico)	Capacity: 35,563	Capacity: 26,900	Capacity: 23,609

=== 1974 ===
List of FIFA World Cup stadiums is located in FRG and West Berlin	Munich	West Berlin	Stuttgart	Gelsenkirchen	Düsseldorf
List of FIFA World Cup stadiums is located in FRG and West Berlin	Olympiastadion	Olympiastadion	Neckarstadion	Parkstadion	Rheinstadion
List of FIFA World Cup stadiums is located in FRG and West Berlin	Capacity: 77,573	Capacity: 86,000	Capacity: 72,200	Capacity: 72,000	Capacity: 70,100
List of FIFA World Cup stadiums is located in FRG and West Berlin	Frankfurt	Hamburg		Hanover	Dortmund
List of FIFA World Cup stadiums is located in FRG and West Berlin	Waldstadion	Volksparkstadion		Niedersachsenstadion	Westfalenstadion
List of FIFA World Cup stadiums is located in FRG and West Berlin	Capacity: 62,200	Capacity: 61,300		Capacity: 60,400	Capacity: 53,600

=== 1978 ===
Of the 6 venues used, the Argentine national stadium, the Estadio Monumental in Buenos Aires was the largest and most used venue, hosting 9 total matches, including the final match. The Carreras Stadium in Córdoba hosted 8 matches, the stadiums in Mendoza, Rosario and Mar del Plata each hosted 6 matches and the José Amalfitani Stadium in Buenos Aires hosted 3 matches. The Minella stadium in Mar del Plata was heavily criticized due to its terrible pitch, which was deemed "nearly unplayable"; whereas the Amalfitani stadium in Buenos Aires, the least used stadium for this tournament, was praised for its very good pitch.

Brazil was forced by tournament organizers to play all three of its first group matches in Mar del Plata.

List of FIFA World Cup stadiums is located in Argentina	Buenos Aires		Córdoba
List of FIFA World Cup stadiums is located in Argentina	Estadio Monumental	José Amalfitani Stadium	Estadio Córdoba
List of FIFA World Cup stadiums is located in Argentina	Capacity: 74,624	Capacity: 49,318	Capacity: 46,986
List of FIFA World Cup stadiums is located in Argentina	Mar del Plata	Rosario	Mendoza
List of FIFA World Cup stadiums is located in Argentina	Estadio José María Minella	Estadio Gigante de Arroyito	Estadio Ciudad de Mendoza
List of FIFA World Cup stadiums is located in Argentina	Capacity: 43,542	Capacity: 41,654	Capacity: 34,954

=== 1982 ===
17 stadiums in 14 cities hosted the tournament, a record until the 2002 tournament which was hosted by 20 stadiums. The most used stadium was FC Barcelona's Camp Nou stadium which hosted 5 matches including a semi-final match; it was the largest stadium used for this tournament. In addition to Barcelona's Sarria Stadium hosting 3 total matches, Barcelona was the Spanish city with the most matches in Espana '82 with 8; the Spanish capital of Madrid followed with 7.

This particular World Cup was organised in such a way where all of the matches of each of the six groups of four were assigned stadiums in cities close in proximity to each other; reducing the stress of travel on the players and fans. For example: Group 1 only played in Vigo and A Coruña, Group 2 only played in Gijón and Oviedo, Group 3 only played in Elche and Alicante (except for the first match, which was the opening match of the tournament, which was played at the Camp Nou), Group 4 played only in Bilbao and Valladolid (England played all their first round group matches in Bilbao), Group 5 (which included hosts Spain) was played exclusively in Valencia and Zaragoza, and Group 6 played exclusively in Seville and Málaga (of the 3 1st round matches in Seville, the first match between Brazil and the USSR was played in the Ramón Sánchez Pizjuán Stadium, and the other two were played in the Villamarin Stadium).

When the tournament went into the round-robin second round matches, all the aforementioned cities excluding Barcelona, Alicante and Seville did not host any more matches in Espana '82. Both the Santiago Bernabéu and Vicente Calderón stadiums in Madrid and the Sarria Stadium in Barcelona were used for the first time for this tournament for the second round matches. Madrid and Barcelona hosted the four second round group matches; Barcelona hosted Groups A and C (Camp Nou hosted all 3 of Group A's matches, and Sarria did the same with Group C's matches) and Madrid hosted Groups B and D (Real Madrid's Bernabeu Stadium hosted all 3 of Group B's matches, and Atlético Madrid's Calderon Stadium did the same with the Group D matches)

The two semi final matches were held at Camp Nou and the Pizjuan Stadium in Seville, the third largest stadium used for the tournament (one of only 2 Espana '82 matches it hosted), the match for third place was held in Alicante and the final was held at the Bernabeu, the second largest stadium used for this tournament.

Spain's hot summer climate was avoided by playing most matches in the late afternoon or at night; for instance Seville- which is one of the hottest cities in Europe, with June and July average temperatures going past the 90s Fahrenheit (32 Celsius)- could only play its matches at 21:00. During the group stages, all the southern coastal cities with their hot summer weather saw all their matches start at 21:00 local time; and the northern cities with their cooler weather had their matches start at 17:15 local time.

List of FIFA World Cup stadiums (Spain)		Madrid		Barcelona		Elche
List of FIFA World Cup stadiums (Spain)		Santiago Bernabéu	Vicente Calderón	Camp Nou	Sarrià	Martínez Valero
List of FIFA World Cup stadiums (Spain)		Capacity: 90,800	Capacity: 65,695	Capacity: 97,679	Capacity: 40,400	Capacity: 53,290
List of FIFA World Cup stadiums (Spain)		Sevilla		Valencia	Bilbao	Gijón
List of FIFA World Cup stadiums (Spain)		Ramón Sánchez Pizjuán	Benito Villamarín	Luis Casanova	San Mamés	El Molinón
List of FIFA World Cup stadiums (Spain)		Capacity: 68,110	Capacity: 50,253	Capacity: 47,542	Capacity: 46,223	Capacity: 45,153
Zaragoza	Málaga	A Coruña	Vigo	Valladolid	Alicante	Oviedo
La Romareda	La Rosaleda	Riazor	Balaídos	José Zorrilla	José Rico Pérez	Carlos Tartiere
Capacity: 41,806	Capacity: 34,411	Capacity: 34,190	Capacity: 33,000	Capacity: 29,990	Capacity: 28,421	Capacity: 23,500

=== 1986 ===
Eleven cities hosted the tournament. The Estadio Azteca in Mexico City, the largest stadium used for the tournament, hosted 9 matches (including the final), more than any other stadium used. Mexico City hosted 13 total matches; the Olimpico Universitario Stadium hosted 4 matches (if the Mexico City suburban town Nezahualcoyotl's matches are included, this brings the total up to 16 matches). The Estadio Jalisco in Guadalajara hosted 7 matches, and the Estiado Cuauhtémoc in Puebla hosted 5 matches.

The hot and rainy summer weather in Mexico varied from desert locations like Monterrey to tropical locations such as Guadalajara; but perhaps the greatest hardship the players had to contend with was the high altitude of the Mexican locations. With the exception of Monterrey (still 2,000 feet above sea level), all of the stadiums were located in cities that varied anywhere from Guadalajara being 5,138 feet (1,566 meters) above sea level to Toluca being 8,730 feet (2,660 m) above sea level- making conditions very difficult for the players running around in these stadiums. Mexico City, the location of the final match and the location where the most matches were played was 7,380 feet (2,250 m) above sea level.

1. Mexico City, 2. Guadalajara, 3. Puebla, 4. San Nicolás, 5. Querétaro, 6. Monterrey, 7. León, 8. Nezahualcóyotl, 9. Irapuato, 10. Zapopan, 11. Toluca.	Mexico City		Guadalajara	Puebla
1. Mexico City, 2. Guadalajara, 3. Puebla, 4. San Nicolás, 5. Querétaro, 6. Monterrey, 7. León, 8. Nezahualcóyotl, 9. Irapuato, 10. Zapopan, 11. Toluca.	Estadio Azteca	Estadio Olímpico Universitario	Estadio Jalisco	Estadio Cuauhtémoc
1. Mexico City, 2. Guadalajara, 3. Puebla, 4. San Nicolás, 5. Querétaro, 6. Monterrey, 7. León, 8. Nezahualcóyotl, 9. Irapuato, 10. Zapopan, 11. Toluca.	Capacity: 110,574	Capacity: 72,212	Capacity: 66,193	Capacity: 46,416
1. Mexico City, 2. Guadalajara, 3. Puebla, 4. San Nicolás, 5. Querétaro, 6. Monterrey, 7. León, 8. Nezahualcóyotl, 9. Irapuato, 10. Zapopan, 11. Toluca.	San Nicolás de los Garza	Querétaro	Nezahualcoyotl	Monterrey
1. Mexico City, 2. Guadalajara, 3. Puebla, 4. San Nicolás, 5. Querétaro, 6. Monterrey, 7. León, 8. Nezahualcóyotl, 9. Irapuato, 10. Zapopan, 11. Toluca.	Estadio Universitario	Estadio La Corregidora	Estadio Neza 86	Estadio Tecnológico
1. Mexico City, 2. Guadalajara, 3. Puebla, 4. San Nicolás, 5. Querétaro, 6. Monterrey, 7. León, 8. Nezahualcóyotl, 9. Irapuato, 10. Zapopan, 11. Toluca.	Capacity: 43,780	Capacity: 38,576	Capacity: 34,536	Capacity: 33,805
1. Mexico City, 2. Guadalajara, 3. Puebla, 4. San Nicolás, 5. Querétaro, 6. Monterrey, 7. León, 8. Nezahualcóyotl, 9. Irapuato, 10. Zapopan, 11. Toluca.	Toluca	Irapuato	León	Zapopan
1. Mexico City, 2. Guadalajara, 3. Puebla, 4. San Nicolás, 5. Querétaro, 6. Monterrey, 7. León, 8. Nezahualcóyotl, 9. Irapuato, 10. Zapopan, 11. Toluca.	Estadio Nemesio Díez	Estadio Sergio León Chávez	Estadio Nou Camp	Estadio Tres de Marzo
1. Mexico City, 2. Guadalajara, 3. Puebla, 4. San Nicolás, 5. Querétaro, 6. Monterrey, 7. León, 8. Nezahualcóyotl, 9. Irapuato, 10. Zapopan, 11. Toluca.	Capacity: 32,612	Capacity: 31,336	Capacity: 30,531	Capacity: 30,015

All of these venues except Monterrey were located in central Mexico, as this tournament was organised with the then-standard way of keeping teams playing in locations in close proximity to each other. Group A only played at the Olimpico and in Puebla (except for the Bulgaria-Italy opening tournament match, which was played in the Azteca), Group B only played at the Azteca and in Toluca (hosts Mexico were drawn in this group; they played all their group stage matches at the Azteca), Group C played in León and Irapuato, Group D only played in Guadalajara (including the Guadalajara area town of Zapopan; the last match of this group was played in Monterrey), Group E exclusively played in Querétaro and Nezahualcóyotl, and Group F played in the northern city of Monterrey (including the Monterrey area town of San Nicolas de los Garza; the last match of this group was played in Guadalajara). All of the venues listed hosted knockout round matches except the ones in Nezahualcoyotl, Irapuato, Zapopan, Toluca and the Estadio Tecnológico in Monterrey.

=== 1990 ===
Twelve stadiums were selected to host the World Cup matches in twelve cities. The Stadio San Nicola in Bari and Turin's Stadio delle Alpi were completely new venues opened for the World Cup.

The remaining ten venues all underwent extensive programmes of improvements in preparation for the tournament, forcing many of the club tenants of the stadiums to move to temporary homes. Additional seating and roofs were added to most stadiums, with further redevelopments seeing running tracks removed and new pitches laid. Due to structural constraints, several of the existing stadiums had to be virtually rebuilt to implement the changes required.

Like Espana '82, the group stage of this tournament was organized in such a way where specific groups only played in two cities close in proximity to each other. Group A only played in Rome and Florence (Hosts Italy played all their competitive matches in Rome, except for their semi-final and match for third place fixtures, which were played in Naples and Bari, respectively), Group B played their matches in Naples and Bari (except for Argentina vs. Cameroon, which was the opening match of the tournament, played in Milan), Group C played their matches in Turin and Genoa, Group D played all their matches in Milan and Bologna, Group E played only in Udine and Verona, and Group F played on the island cities of Cagliari and Palermo. The cities that hosted the most World Cup matches were the two biggest cities in Italy: Rome and Milan, each hosting six matches, and Bari, Naples and Turin each hosted five matches. Cagliari, Udine, and Palermo were the only cities of the 12 selected that did not host any knockout round matches. All matches, typical of a World Cup in Europe were played in the late afternoon or the evening to avoid the intense heat of an Italian summer.

The England national team, at the British government's request, were forced to play all their matches at Stadio Sant'Elia in Cagliari on the island of Sardinia. Hooliganism, rife in English football in the 1980s, had followed the national team while they played friendlies on the European continent – the distrust of English fans was so high that the English FA's reputation and even diplomatic relations between the U.K. and Italy were seen to be at risk if England played any group stage matches on the Italian mainland. Thanks largely to British Sports Minister Colin Moynihan's negative remarks about English fans weeks before the match, security around Cagliari during England's three matches there was extremely heavy – in addition to 7,000 local police and Carabineri, highly trained Italian military special forces were also there patrolling the premises. The Italian authorities' heavy presence proved to be justified as there were several riots during the time England were playing their matches in Cagliari, leading to a number of injuries, arrests and even deportations.

Most of the construction cost in excess of their original estimates and total costs ended up being over £550 million (approximately $935 million). Rome's Stadio Olimpico which would host the final was the most expensive project overall, while Udine's Stadio Friuli, the newest of the existing stadiums (opened 14 years prior), cost the least to redevelop.

List of FIFA World Cup stadiums is located in Italy		Rome	Milan	Naples	Turin	Bari
List of FIFA World Cup stadiums is located in Italy		Stadio Olimpico	San Siro	Stadio San Paolo	Stadio delle Alpi	Stadio San Nicola
List of FIFA World Cup stadiums is located in Italy		41°56′1.99″N 12°27′17.23″E	45°28′40.89″N 9°7′27.14″E	40°49′40.68″N 14°11′34.83″E	45°06′34.42″N 7°38′28.54″E	41°5′5.05″N 16°50′24.26″E
List of FIFA World Cup stadiums is located in Italy		Capacity: 84,800	Capacity: 83,407	Capacity: 83,311	Capacity: 71,362	Capacity: 58,270
Florence	Genoa	Cagliari	Verona	Udine	Bologna	Palermo
Stadio Comunale	Stadio Luigi Ferraris	Stadio Sant'Elia	Stadio Marc'Antonio Bentegodi	Stadio Friuli	Stadio Renato Dall'Ara	Stadio La Favorita
43°46′50.96″N 11°16′56.13″E	44°24′59.15″N 8°57′8.74″E	39°11′57.82″N 9°8′5.83″E	45°26′7.28″N 10°58′7.13″E	46°4′53.77″N 13°12′0.49″E	44°29′32.33″N 11°18′34.80″E	38°9′9.96″N 13°20′32.19″E
Capacity: 49,000	Capacity: 44,800	Capacity: 44,200	Capacity: 43,216	Capacity: 42,311	Capacity: 41,200	Capacity: 40,632

=== 1994 ===
The games were played in nine cities across the country. All stadiums had a capacity of at least 53,000, and their usual tenants were professional or college American football teams. The venue used most was the Rose Bowl in Pasadena, with eight games, among them one round of 16 match, a semi-final, the third-place game, and the final. The least used was the Pontiac Silverdome near Detroit, the first indoor stadium used in a World Cup, with four group stage games. The Pontiac Silverdome was also the only venue of the 9 used that did not host any knockout round matches.

Because of the large area of the continental United States, the match locations were often far apart. Some teams in Groups A and B had to travel from Los Angeles or San Francisco all the way to Detroit and back again, covering 2,300 mi (3,700 km) and three time zones one way. The teams in Groups C and D only played in Foxborough (Boston), Chicago and Dallas – a trip from Boston to Dallas is 2,000 miles (3,200 km), but only covers one time zone; Chicago is in the same time zone as Dallas but is still 1,000 miles (1,600 km) away from both Dallas and Boston. The teams in Groups E and F's travel was a bit easier – they played exclusively in East Rutherford (New York City), Washington and Orlando. A few teams such as Cameroon and Italy did not have to travel great distances to cities to play matches.

The variety of climate in cities all over the United States made playing conditions challenging; aside from the oceanic coolness of Boston (Foxborough), the Mediterranean climate of San Francisco (Stanford) and occasionally the coolness of Chicago, most matches were played in very hot and/or humid conditions. Although playing in the sometimes triple-digit dry heat and smoggy conditions of Los Angeles (Pasadena) and the intense mixture of heat and humidity of Washington and New York City (East Rutherford) proved to be difficult, the cities with the most oppressive conditions were the southern cities of Orlando and Dallas because of the combination of triple-digit heat and extreme humidity. The Floridian tropical climate of Orlando meant all matches there were played in temperatures of 95 °F (35 °C) or above with humidity at 70% or more (the temperature there during the group stage match between Mexico and Ireland was 105 °F (41 °C)) thanks to the mid-day start times. Dallas was not much different: in the semi-arid heat of a Texas summer, temperatures exceeded 100 °F (38 °C) during mid-day, when matches there were staged in the open-type Cotton Bowl meant that conditions were just as oppressive there as they were in Orlando. Detroit also proved to be difficult: the Pontiac Silverdome did not have a working cooling system and because it was an interior dome-shaped stadium, the air could not escape through circulation, so temperatures inside the stadium would climb past 90 °F (32 °C) with 40% humidity. United States midfielder Thomas Dooley described the Silverdome as "the worst place I have ever played at".

List of FIFA World Cup stadiums (the United States)			Pasadena, California (Los Angeles area)	Stanford, California (San Francisco Bay Area)	Pontiac, Michigan (Detroit area)
List of FIFA World Cup stadiums (the United States)			Rose Bowl	Stanford Stadium	Pontiac Silverdome
List of FIFA World Cup stadiums (the United States)			Capacity: 91,794	Capacity: 80,906	Capacity: 77,557
East Rutherford, New Jersey (New York City area)	Dallas, Texas	Chicago, Illinois	Orlando, Florida	Foxborough, Massachusetts (Boston area)	Washington, D.C.
Giants Stadium	Cotton Bowl	Soldier Field	Citrus Bowl	Foxboro Stadium	Robert F. Kennedy Memorial Stadium
Capacity: 75,338	Capacity: 63,998	Capacity: 63,117	Capacity: 61,219	Capacity: 53,644	Capacity: 53,142

=== 1998 ===
France's bid to host the World Cup centered on a national stadium with 80,000 seats and nine other stadiums located across the country. When the finals were originally awarded in July 1992, none of the regional club grounds were of a capacity meeting FIFA's requirements – namely being able to safely seat 40,000. The proposed national stadium, colloquially referred to as the 'Grand stade' met with controversy at every stage of planning; the stadium's location was determined by politics, finance and national symbolism. As Mayor of Paris, Jacques Chirac successfully negotiated a deal with Prime Minister Édouard Balladur to bring the Stade de France – as it was named now, to the commune of Saint-Denis just north of the capital city. Construction on the stadium started in December 1995 and was completed after 26 months of work in November 1997 at a cost of ₣2.67 billion.

The choice of stadium locations was drafted from an original list of 14 cities. FIFA and CFO monitored the progress and quality of preparations, culminating in the former providing final checks of the grounds weeks before the tournament commenced. Montpellier was the surprise inclusion from the final list of cities because of its low urban hierarchy in comparison to Strasbourg, who boasted a better hierarchy and success from its local football team, having been taken over by a consortium. Montpellier however was considered ambitious by the selecting panel to host World Cup matches. The local city and regional authorities in particular had invested heavily into football the previous two decades and were able to measure economic effects, in terms of jobs as early as in 1997. Some of the venues used for this tournament were also used for the previous World Cup in France in 1938. The Stade Vélodrome in Marseille, the Parc Lescure in Bordeaux and the Parc des Princes in Paris received the honour of hosting World Cup matches once again in 1998 as they had all done in 1938.

10 stadiums in total were used for the finals; in addition to nine matches being played at the Stade de France (the most used stadium in the tournament), a further six matches took place in Paris Saint-Germain's Parc des Princes, bringing Paris's total matches hosted to 15. France played four of their seven matches in the national stadium; they also played in the country's second and third largest cities, Marseille (hosting 7 total matches) and Lyon (hosting 6 total matches), as well as a Round of 16 knockout match in the northern city of Lens (also hosting 6 total matches). Nantes, Toulouse, Bordeaux, Montpellier and Saint-Étienne also hosted 6 matches in total; all of the stadiums used also hosted knockout round matches.

List of FIFA World Cup stadiums is located in France		Saint-Denis	Marseille	Paris	Lyon
List of FIFA World Cup stadiums is located in France		Stade de France	Stade Vélodrome	Parc des Princes	Stade de Gerland
List of FIFA World Cup stadiums is located in France		48°55′28″N 2°21′36″E	43°16′11″N 5°23′45″E	48°50′29″N 2°15′11″E	45°43′26″N 4°49′56″E
List of FIFA World Cup stadiums is located in France		Capacity: 80,000	Capacity: 60,000	Capacity: 48,875	Capacity: 44,000
Lens	Nantes	Toulouse	Saint-Étienne	Bordeaux	Montpellier
Stade Félix-Bollaert	Stade de la Beaujoire	Stadium de Toulouse	Stade Geoffroy-Guichard	Parc Lescure	Stade de la Mosson
50°25′58.26″N 2°48′53.47″E	47°15′20.27″N 1°31′31.35″W	43°34′59.93″N 1°26′2.57″E	45°27′38.76″N 4°23′24.42″E	44°49′45″N 0°35′52″W	43°37′19.85″N 3°48′43.28″E
Capacity: 41,300	Capacity: 39,500	Capacity: 37,000	Capacity: 36,000	Capacity: 35,200	Capacity: 34,000

=== 2002 ===
South Korea and Japan each provided 10 venues, the vast majority of them newly built for the tournament. Groups A-D played all their matches in South Korea, and Groups E-H played all their matches in Japan. The stadiums in Daegu, Suwon, Yokohama and Saitama all hosted 4 matches each, while the other 16 stadiums hosted 3 matches each. Notably, no matches were played in Tokyo, making it the second capital of a host country not to have a World Cup venue.

South Korea
List of FIFA World Cup stadiums is located in South Korea	Daegu	Seoul	Busan	Incheon	Ulsan
List of FIFA World Cup stadiums is located in South Korea	Daegu World Cup Stadium; Capacity: 68,014; Group/third place	Seoul World Cup Stadium; Capacity: 63,961; Group/Knock-out	Busan Asiad Stadium; Capacity: 55,982; Group	Incheon Munhak Stadium; Capacity: 52,179; Group	Ulsan Munsu Football Stadium; Capacity: 43,550; Group/Knock-out
List of FIFA World Cup stadiums is located in South Korea	Suwon	Gwangju	Jeonju	Seogwipo	Daejeon
List of FIFA World Cup stadiums is located in South Korea	Suwon World Cup Stadium; Capacity: 43,188; Group/Knock-out	Gwangju World Cup Stadium; Capacity: 42,880; Group/Knock-out	Jeonju World Cup Stadium; Capacity: 42,391; Group/Knock-out	Jeju World Cup Stadium; Capacity: 42,256; Group/Knock-out	Daejeon World Cup Stadium; Capacity: 40,407; Group/Knock-out
Japan
List of FIFA World Cup stadiums is located in Japan	Yokohama	Saitama	Fukuroi	Osaka	Rifu
List of FIFA World Cup stadiums is located in Japan	International Stadium Yokohama; Capacity: 72,327; Group/Final	Saitama Stadium 2002; Capacity: 63,000; Group/Knock-out	Shizuoka "Ecopa" Stadium; Capacity: 50,600; Group/Knock-out	Nagai Stadium; Capacity: 50,000; Group/Knock-out	Miyagi Stadium; Capacity: 49,000; Group/Knock-out
List of FIFA World Cup stadiums is located in Japan	Ōita	Niigata	Kashima	Kobe	Sapporo
List of FIFA World Cup stadiums is located in Japan	Ōita Stadium; Capacity: 43,000; Group/Knock-out	Niigata Stadium; Capacity: 42,300; Group/Knock-out	Kashima Soccer Stadium; Capacity: 42,000; Group	Kobe Wing Stadium; Capacity: 42,000; Group/Knock-out	Sapporo Dome; Capacity: 42,000; Group

=== 2006 ===
In 2006, Germany had a plethora of football stadiums that satisfied FIFA's minimum capacity of 40,000 seats for World Cup matches. The still-standing Olympiastadion in Munich (69,250) was not used for the tournament, even though FIFA's regulations allow one city to use two stadiums. Düsseldorf's LTU Arena (51,500), Bremen's Weserstadion (43,000) and Mönchengladbach's Borussia-Park (46,249) were also not used.

Twelve stadiums were selected to host the World Cup matches. During the tournament, many of them were known by different names, as FIFA prohibits sponsorship of stadiums unless the stadium sponsors are also official FIFA sponsors. For example, the Allianz Arena in Munich was known during the competition as FIFA World Cup Stadium, Munich (German: FIFA WM-Stadion München), and even the letters of the company Allianz were removed or covered. Some of the stadiums also had a lower capacity for the World Cup, as FIFA regulations ban standing room; nonetheless, this was accommodated as several stadiums had a UEFA five-star ranking. The stadiums in Berlin, Munich, Dortmund and Stuttgart hosted six matches each, while the other eight stadiums hosted five matches each.

List of FIFA World Cup stadiums (Germany)		Berlin	Dortmund	Munich	Stuttgart	Gelsenkirchen
List of FIFA World Cup stadiums (Germany)		Olympiastadion	Westfalenstadion	Allianz Arena	Gottlieb-Daimler-Stadion	Arena AufSchalke
List of FIFA World Cup stadiums (Germany)		Olympiastadion	FIFA World Cup Stadium, Dortmund	FIFA World Cup Stadium, Munich	Gottlieb-Daimler-Stadion	FIFA World Cup Stadium, Gelsenkirchen
List of FIFA World Cup stadiums (Germany)		52°30′53″N 13°14′22″E	51°29′33.25″N 7°27′6.63″E	48°13′7.59″N 11°37′29.11″E	48°47′32.17″N 9°13′55.31″E	51°33′16.21″N 7°4′3.32″E
List of FIFA World Cup stadiums (Germany)		Capacity: 72,000	Capacity: 65,000	Capacity: 66,000	Capacity: 52,000	Capacity: 52,000
Hamburg	Frankfurt	Cologne	Hanover	Leipzig	Kaiserslautern	Nuremberg
Volksparkstadion	Commerzbank-Arena	RheinEnergieStadion	Niedersachsenstadion	Zentralstadion	Fritz-Walter-Stadion	Max-Morlock-Stadion
FIFA World Cup Stadium, Hamburg	FIFA World Cup Stadium, Frankfurt	FIFA World Cup Stadium, Cologne	FIFA World Cup Stadium, Hanover	Zentralstadion	Fritz-Walter-Stadion	Frankenstadion
53°35′13.77″N 9°53′55.02″E	50°4′6.86″N 8°38′43.65″E	50°56′0.59″N 6°52′29.99″E	52°21′36.24″N 9°43′52.31″E	51°20′44.86″N 12°20′53.59″E	49°26′4.96″N 7°46′35.24″E	49°25′34″N 11°7′33″E
Capacity: 50,000	Capacity: 48,000	Capacity: 45,000	Capacity: 43,000	Capacity: 43,000	Capacity: 46,000	Capacity: 41,000

=== 2010 ===
In 2005, the organisers released a provisional list of 13 venues to be used for the World Cup: Bloemfontein, Cape Town, Durban, Johannesburg (two venues), Kimberley, Klerksdorp, Nelspruit, Orkney, Polokwane, Port Elizabeth, Pretoria, and Rustenburg. This was narrowed down to the ten venues that were officially announced by FIFA on 17 March 2006.

The altitude of several venues affected the motion of the ball and player performance, although FIFA's medical chief downplayed this consideration. Six of the ten venues were over 1,200 m (3,900 ft) above sea level, with the two Johannesburg venues – the FNB Stadium (also known as Soccer City) and Ellis Park Stadium – the highest at approximately 1,750 m (5,740 ft).

The FNB Stadium, the Cape Town Stadium and the Nelson Mandela Bay Stadium in Port Elizabeth were the most-used venues, each hosting eight matches. Ellis Park Stadium and the Moses Mabhida Stadium in Durban hosted seven matches each, while the Loftus Versfeld Stadium in Pretoria, the Free State Stadium in Bloemfontein and the Royal Bafokeng Stadium in Rustenburg hosted six matches each. The Peter Mokaba Stadium in Polokwane and the Mbombela Stadium in Nelspruit hosted four matches each, but did not host any knockout-stage matches.

List of FIFA World Cup stadiums (South Africa)		Johannesburg		Cape Town	Durban
List of FIFA World Cup stadiums (South Africa)		FNB Stadium (Soccer City)	Ellis Park Stadium	Cape Town Stadium (Green Point Stadium)	Moses Mabhida Stadium (Durban Stadium)
List of FIFA World Cup stadiums (South Africa)		26°14′5.27″S 27°58′56.47″E	26°11′51.07″S 28°3′38.76″E	33°54′12.46″S 18°24′40.15″E	29°49′46″S 31°01′49″E
List of FIFA World Cup stadiums (South Africa)		Capacity: 84,490	Capacity: 55,686	Capacity: 64,100	Capacity: 62,760
Pretoria	Port Elizabeth	Polokwane	Nelspruit	Bloemfontein	Rustenburg
Loftus Versfeld Stadium	Nelson Mandela Bay Stadium	Peter Mokaba Stadium	Mbombela Stadium	Free State Stadium	Royal Bafokeng Stadium
25°45′12″S 28°13′22″E	33°56′16″S 25°35′56″E	23°55′29″S 29°28′08″E	25°27′42″S 30°55′47″E	29°07′02.25″S 26°12′31.85″E	25°34′43″S 27°09′39″E
Capacity: 42,858	Capacity: 42,486	Capacity: 41,733	Capacity: 40,929	Capacity: 40,911	Capacity: 38,646

=== 2014 ===
12 venues (seven new and five renovated) in twelve cities were selected for the tournament. The venues covered all the main regions of Brazil and created more evenly distributed hosting than the 1950 finals in Brazil. Consequently, the tournament required long-distance travel for teams. During the World Cup, Brazilian cities were also home to the participating teams at 32 separate base camps, as well as staging official fan fests where supporters could view the games.

The most-used stadiums were the Maracana and Brasília, which hosted 7 matches each. São Paulo, Fortaleza, Belo Horizonte and Salvador hosted 6 matches each, Porto Alegre and Recife hosted 5 matches each, and Cuiaba, Manaus, Natal and Curitiba hosted 4 matches each and being the 4 smallest stadiums used, the 4 aforementioned cities did not host any knockout rounds.

List of FIFA World Cup stadiums is located in Brazil		Rio de Janeiro	Brasília	São Paulo	Fortaleza	Belo Horizonte
List of FIFA World Cup stadiums is located in Brazil		Estádio do Maracanã	Estádio Nacional	Arena de São Paulo	Estádio Castelão	Estádio Mineirão
List of FIFA World Cup stadiums is located in Brazil		Capacity: 74,738	Capacity: 69,432	Capacity: 63,321	Capacity: 60,348	Capacity: 58,259
Salvador	Porto Alegre	Recife (Note: The Itaipava Arena Pernambuco is located in São Lourenço da Mata, Recife metropolitan area.)	Cuiabá	Manaus	Natal	Curitiba
Arena Fonte Nova	Estádio Beira-Rio	Arena Pernambuco	Arena Pantanal	Arena da Amazônia	Arena das Dunas	Arena da Baixada
Capacity: 51,708	Capacity: 43,394	Capacity: 42,583	Capacity: 41,112	Capacity: 40,549	Capacity: 39,971	Capacity: 39,631

=== 2018 ===
A total of twelve stadiums in eleven Russian cities were built and renovated for the FIFA World Cup.

- Kaliningrad: Kaliningrad Stadium. The first piles were driven into the ground in September 2015. On 11 April 2018, the new stadium hosted its first match.
- Kazan: Kazan Arena. The stadium was built for the 2013 Summer Universiade. It has since hosted the 2015 World Aquatics Championship and the 2017 FIFA Confederations Cup. The stadium serves as a home arena to FC Rubin Kazan.
- Moscow: Luzhniki Stadium. The largest stadium in the country was closed for renovation in 2013. The stadium was commissioned in November 2017.
- Moscow: Spartak Stadium. The stadium is a home arena to its namesake FC Spartak Moscow. In accordance with the FIFA requirements, during the 2018 World Cup it is called Spartak Stadium instead of its usual name Otkritie Arena. The stadium hosted its first match on 5 September 2014.
- Nizhny Novgorod: Nizhny Novgorod Stadium. The construction of the Nizhny Novgorod Stadium commenced in 2015. The project was completed in December 2017.
- Rostov-on-Don: Rostov Arena. The stadium is located on the left bank of the Don River. The stadium construction was completed on 22 December 2017.
- Saint Petersburg: Saint Petersburg Stadium. The construction of the stadium commenced in 2007. The project was officially completed on 29 December 2016. The stadium has hosted games of the 2017 FIFA Confederations Cup and served as a venue for UEFA Euro 2020.
- Samara: Samara Arena. The construction officially started on 21 July 2014. The project was completed on 21 April 2018.
- Saransk: Mordovia Arena. The stadium in Saransk was scheduled to be commissioned in 2012 in time for the opening of the all-Russian Spartakiad, but the plan was revised. The opening was rescheduled to 2017. The arena hosted its first match on 21 April 2018.
- Sochi: Fisht Stadium. The stadium hosted the opening and closing ceremonies of the 2014 Winter Olympics. It was later renovated in preparation for the 2017 FIFA Confederations Cup and 2018 World Cup.
- Volgograd: Volgograd Arena. The main arena of Volgograd was built on the demolished Central Stadium site, at the foot of the Mamayev Kurgan memorial complex. The stadium was commissioned on 3 April 2018.
- Yekaterinburg: Ekaterinburg Arena. The Central Stadium of Yekaterinburg has been renovated for the FIFA World Cup. The arena's stands have a capacity of 35,000 spectators. The renovation project was completed in December 2017.

List of FIFA World Cup stadiums is located in European Russia	Moscow		Saint Petersburg	Sochi	Samara	Kazan
List of FIFA World Cup stadiums is located in European Russia	Luzhniki Stadium	Otkritie Arena (Spartak Stadium)	Krestovsky Stadium (Saint Petersburg Stadium)	Fisht Olympic Stadium (Fisht Stadium)	Cosmos Arena (Samara Arena)	Kazan Arena
List of FIFA World Cup stadiums is located in European Russia	Capacity: 78,011	Capacity: 44,190	Capacity: 64,468	Capacity: 44,287	Capacity: 41,970	Capacity: 42,873
List of FIFA World Cup stadiums is located in European Russia	Rostov-on-Don	Volgograd	Nizhny Novgorod	Yekaterinburg	Saransk	Kaliningrad
List of FIFA World Cup stadiums is located in European Russia	Rostov Arena	Volgograd Arena	Nizhny Novgorod; Stadium	Central Stadium (Ekaterinburg Arena)	Mordovia Arena	Kaliningrad Stadium
List of FIFA World Cup stadiums is located in European Russia	Capacity: 43,472	Capacity: 43,713	Capacity: 43,319	Capacity: 33,061	Capacity: 41,685	Capacity: 33,973

=== 2022 ===
The first five proposed venues for the World Cup were unveiled at the beginning of March 2010. The stadiums aimed to employ cooling technology capable of reducing temperatures within the stadium by up to 20 °C (36 °F), and the upper tiers of the stadiums were disassembled after the World Cup and donated to countries with less developed sports infrastructure. The country intended for the stadiums to reflect the historical and cultural aspects of Qatar. Each stadium incorporated four priorities, which were legacy, comfort, accessibility and sustainability. Qatar aimed to build the stadiums with the highest sustainability and environmental standards. The stadiums were equipped with cooling systems that were environmentally friendly overcoming the challenging environmental nature of the country. The plan was to build Zero Waste stadiums using environmentally friendly materials, harmless equipment, and ecologically sustainable solutions through the implementation of renewable and low energy solutions. Qatar aspired to be compliant and certified by the Global Sustainability Assessment System (GSAS) for all the World Cup stadiums. All of the five stadium projects launched were designed by German architect Albert Speer & Partners. Leading football clubs in Europe wanted the World Cup to take place from 28 April to 29 May rather than the typical June and July staging, due to concerns about the heat.

A report released on 9 December 2010 quoted FIFA President Sepp Blatter as stating that other nations could host some matches during the World Cup. However, no specific countries were named in the report. Blatter added that any such decision must be taken by Qatar first and then endorsed by FIFA's executive committee. Prince Ali bin Al Hussein of Jordan told the Australian Associated Press that holding games in Bahrain, United Arab Emirates, and possibly Saudi Arabia would help to incorporate the people of the region during the tournament.

According to a report released in April 2013 by Merrill Lynch, the investment banking division of Bank of America, the organisers in Qatar requested FIFA to approve a smaller number of stadiums due to the growing costs. Bloomberg.com said that Qatar wished to cut the number of venues to eight or nine from the twelve originally planned.

In April 2017, FIFA had yet to finalise the number of stadiums Qatar must have ready in five years' time, however Qatar's Supreme Committee for Delivery & Legacy said it expected there would be eight.

In January 2019, Infantino said that FIFA was exploring the possibility of having neighbouring countries host matches during the tournament, in order to reduce political tensions.

Lusail	Al Khor	Doha	
Lusail Iconic Stadium	Al Bayt Stadium	Stadium 974	Al Thumama Stadium
Capacity: 88,966	Capacity: 68,895	Capacity: 44,089	Capacity: 44,400
Host cities in Qatar		Stadiums in Doha area	
Al Rayyan			Al Wakrah
Khalifa International Stadium	Education City Stadium	Ahmad bin Ali Stadium (Note: Ahmad bin Ali Stadium is in Al Rayyan but outside the area of the Doha area map.)	Al Janoub Stadium
Capacity: 45,857	Capacity: 44,667	Capacity: 45,032	Capacity: 44,325

=== 2026 ===
On 16 June 2022, FIFA selected 16 venues to host the 2026 FIFA World Cup (two in Canada, three in Mexico and 11 in the United States). The venues were separated by three geographical divisions: Vancouver, Seattle, San Francisco, Los Angeles and Guadalajara in the Western Division, Kansas City, Dallas, Houston, Atlanta, Monterrey and Mexico City in the Central Division and Toronto, Boston, New York City, Philadelphia and Miami in the Eastern Division

Boston, Dallas, Los Angeles, New York and San Francisco, which hosted the 1994 FIFA World Cup, were chosen, though all with different stadiums. Atlanta, Houston, Kansas City, Miami, Philadelphia and Seattle were hosting for the first time. The Estadio Azteca will host the FIFA World Cup for the third time in its history.

Mexico City	(United States) New York/New Jersey	(United States) Dallas	(United States) Kansas City	(United States) Houston
Estadio Azteca	MetLife Stadium (East Rutherford, New Jersey)	AT&T Stadium (Arlington, Texas)	Arrowhead Stadium	NRG Stadium
Capacity: 87,523	Capacity: 82,500 (Bid book capacity: 87,157)	Capacity: 80,000 (Bid book capacity: 92,967) (expandable to 105,000)	Capacity: 76,416 (Bid book capacity: 76,640)	Capacity: 72,220 (expandable to 80,000)
(United States) Atlanta	Host cities			(United States) Los Angeles
Mercedes-Benz Stadium	Host cities			SoFi Stadium (Inglewood, California)
Capacity: 71,000 (Bid book capacity: 75,000) (expandable to 83,000)	Host cities			Capacity: 70,240 (expandable to 100,240)
(United States) Philadelphia	Host cities			(United States) Seattle
Lincoln Financial Field	Host cities			Lumen Field
Capacity: 69,796 (Bid book capacity: 69,328)	Host cities			Capacity: 69,000 (expandable to 72,000)
(United States) San Francisco Bay Area	Host cities			(United States) Boston
Levi's Stadium (Santa Clara, California)	Host cities			Gillette Stadium (Foxborough, Massachusetts)
Capacity: 68,500 (Bid book capacity: 70,909) (expandable to 75,000)	Host cities			Capacity: 65,878 (Bid book capacity: 70,000)
(United States) Miami	(Canada) Vancouver	(Mexico) Monterrey	(Mexico) Guadalajara	(Canada) Toronto
Hard Rock Stadium (Miami Gardens, Florida)	BC Place	Estadio BBVA (Guadalupe, Nuevo León)	Estadio Akron (Zapopan, Jalisco)	BMO Field
Capacity: 64,767 (Bid book capacity: 67,518)	Capacity: 54,500	Capacity: 53,500 (Bid book capacity: 53,460)	Capacity: 49,850 (Bid book capacity: 48,071)	Capacity: 30,000 (Expanding to 45,736 for tournament)

== See also ==
- Lists of stadiums
