= Frederic H. Smith Jr. =

United States Air Force general

Frederic H. Smith Jr. CBE
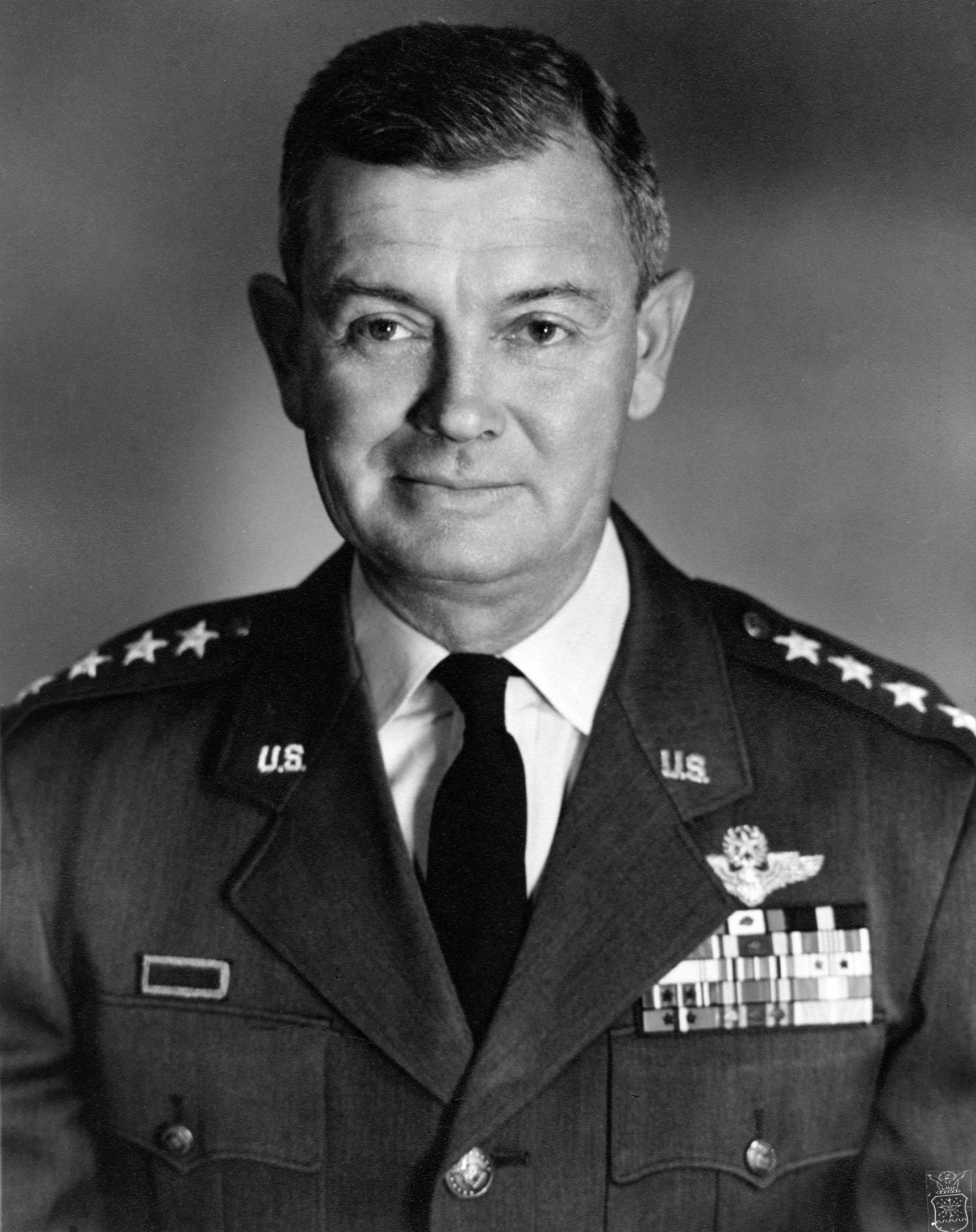
- General Frederic H. Smith Jr. as Vice Chief of Staff of the United States Air Force
- Born: 30 June 1908; Fort Monroe, Virginia, US
- Died: 28 May 1980 (aged 71); San Antonio, Texas, US
- Burial place: Arlington National Cemetery
- Relatives: Ernest J. King (father in law)
- Military career
- Allegiance: United States
- Branch: United States Air Force
- Service years: 1929–1962
- Rank: General
- Commands: Vice Chief of Staff, U.S. Air Force; United States Air Forces in Europe; Air Training Command; United States Forces, Japan; Fifth Air Force
- Conflicts: World War II
- Awards: Army Distinguished Service Medal (2); Navy Distinguished Service Medal; Legion of Merit

Frederic Harrison Smith Jr. CBE (30 June 1908 – 28 May 1980) was a United States Air Force four-star general who served as Commander in Chief, U.S. Air Forces in Europe (CINCUSAFE) from 1959 to 1961; and Vice Chief of Staff, U.S. Air Force (VCSAF) from 1961 to 1962.

== Biography ==
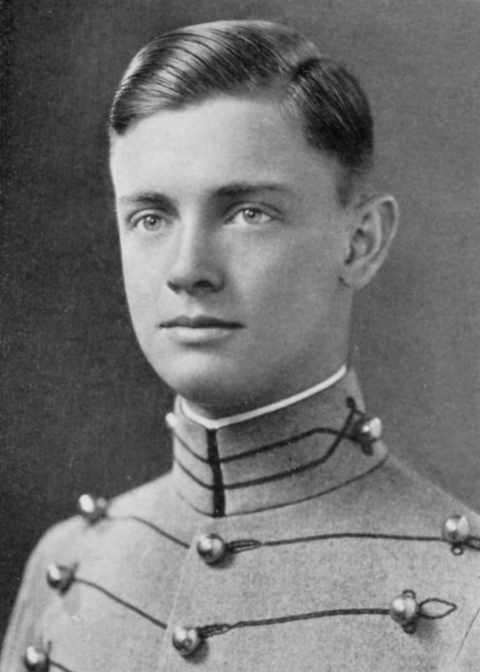
As a West Point cadet

Smith was born at Fort Monroe, Virginia, in 1908. He attended the United States Military Academy at West Point and graduated a second lieutenant of Field Artillery, 13 June 1929.

Smith's first assignment was that of student officer at the Air Corps Primary and Advanced Flying Schools at Brooks and Kelly Fields, Texas. After receiving his wings, he was transferred to the Army Air Corps in December 1930.

His first Air Corps assignment was at France Field, Panama Canal Zone, where he served with the 63rd Service Squadron and the 24th Pursuit Squadron until December 1932. Smith then returned to the U.S. for assignment to the 41st School Squadron at Kelly Field, Texas, in January 1933.

From 1936 to 1939, following three years as flying instructor at Kelly Field, Captain Smith served as senior aeronautical inspector for the Panama Canal, Balboa Heights, Canal Zone. He also acted as advisor on aviation matters to the governor of the Panama Canal.

In late 1939, Captain Smith returned to the States as operations officer of the 36th Pursuit Squadron. A few months later he became its commander at Langley Field, Virginia.

Within a year after Captain Smith assumed his first command, he was appointed commanding officer of the Eighth Pursuit Group, Seventh Pursuit Wing, at Mitchel Field, New York.

In January 1942, Lieutenant Colonel Smith took his Eighth Pursuit Group to the Southwest Pacific. Later in the year he left the pursuit group to become chief of staff of the advanced echelon of the newly activated Fifth Air Force.

Following two years of combat service in the Pacific, Brigadier General Smith was transferred to the European Theater of Operations, where he served as deputy senior Air Staff officer and chief of operations of the Allied Expeditionary Air Forces, based in England.

During the fall of 1944, Brigadier General Smith returned to the U.S to become deputy chief of Air Staff at Headquarters, Army Air Force, Washington, D.C. He returned to the Southwest Pacific in February 1945 to direct the Fifth Fighter Command.

At the end of the war Smith was ordered to Washington for duty in the Office of the Assistant Chief of Air Staff, Plans, at Army Air Force Headquarters. He served there in the Special Organizational Planning Group until March 1946.

In April 1946, he was appointed chief of staff of the Strategic Air Command at Andrews Field, Maryland, and in February 1947 became national commander of the Civil Air Patrol.

On 10 October 1947, following establishment of United States Air Force Headquarters, General Smith was appointed chief of the Requirements Division under the director of Training and Requirements Division in the Office of the Deputy Chief of Staff for Operations.

Major General Smith was appointed assistant for programming in that office in February 1948, a position he held until 14 August 1950. He was then named commanding general of the Eastern Air Defense Force, Stewart Air Force Base, New York.

Smith became vice commander of the Air Defense Command, Ent Air Force Base, Colorado Springs, Colorado, on 1 March 1952. He served there until 20 June 1956, when he was promoted to the rank of lieutenant general and again joined the Fifth Air Force, this time as its commander.

On 1 July 1957, concurrently with a reorganization of the United States Forces in the Pacific Area, General Smith, as commander of the Fifth Air Force, was also appointed commander of the United States Forces, Japan.

In September 1958, General Smith returned to the U.S. to assume command of the Air Training Command, with headquarters at Randolph Air Force Base, Texas. He arrived in Germany in August 1959 to take command of the 4th Allied Tactical Air Force and the United States Air Forces in Europe.

On 1 July 1961, Smith assumed duties as vice chief of staff, United States Air Force, Washington, D.C. He retired from the Air Force on 1 September 1962, and died at his home in San Antonio on 28 May 1980.

General Smith's father-in-law was Fleet Admiral Ernest J. King.

== Awards and decorations ==
Army Distinguished Service Medal with one bronze oak leaf cluster
Navy Distinguished Service Medal
Legion of Merit
Air Medal with oak leaf cluster
Army Commendation Medal
Air Force Presidential Unit Citation
American Defense Service Medal
American Campaign Medal
Asiatic-Pacific Campaign Medal with six service stars
European-African-Middle Eastern Campaign Medal with two service stars
World War II Victory Medal
National Defense Service Medal
Air Force Longevity Service Award with seven oak leaf clusters
Philippine Liberation Medal with two service stars
Order of the British Empire, Commander (Military)

== See also ==
- List of commanders of USAFE

Military offices
Preceded by Frank F. Everest	Commander, United States Air Forces in Europe; 1959 - 1961	Succeeded by Truman H. Landon
Preceded by Curtis E. LeMay	Vice Chief of Staff of the United States Air Force; 1961 - 1962	Succeeded by William F. McKee
