= General Landon =

General Landon may Refer to

- General Truman H Landon a four star US Air Force General World War II and the Cold War
- Major General Herman Landon a British general in the second boer war
- A fictional Character in the game Tales of Zestiria
