= United States Air Forces in Europe – Air Forces Africa =

Major command of the US Air Force

U.S. Air Forces in Europe – Air Forces Africa
- Shield of United States Air Forces in Europe Shield of United States Air Forces Africa
- Active: 19 January 1942 – present (84 years, 7 months) Detailed: 7 August 1945 – present (as United States Air Forces in Europe) 22 February 1942 – 7 August 1945 (as United States Strategic Air Forces in Europe) 18 September 1942 - 22 February 1944 (as Eighth Air Force) 19 January 1942 – 18 September 1942 (as 8 Air Force)
- Country: United States of America
- Branch: United States Air Force (26 September 1947 – present); United States Army ( Army Air Forces; 19 January 1942 – 26 September 1947)
- Type: Major Command
- Role: "Protect the U.S. homeland with our Allies and partners; Project combat-ready airpower in Europe, Africa and beyond; Deter aggression and win decisively should deterrence fail."
- Size: 23,805 airmen 203 aircraft
- Part of: U.S. European Command; U.S. Africa Command
- Headquarters: Ramstein Air Base, Rhineland-Palatinate, Germany
- Motto: "Vigilance for Freedom"
- Engagements: World War II European-African-Middle Eastern Theaters; Berlin airlift

- Decorations: Air Force Organization Excellence Award
- Website: www.usafe.af.mil

Commanders
- Commander: Lt Gen Jason T. Hinds
- Deputy Commander: Brig Gen Stephen P. Snelson
- Command Chief: CCM Randy Kwiatkowski

Aircraft flown
- Attack: MQ-9
- Fighter: F-15E, F-16C/D, F-35A
- Multirole helicopter: HH-60G
- Transport: C-21A, C-37A, C-130J
- Tanker: KC-135R

The United States Air Forces in Europe – Air Forces Africa (USAFE-AFAFRICA) is a major command (MAJCOM) of the United States Air Force (USAF) and a component command of both United States European Command (USEUCOM) and United States Africa Command (USAFRICOM). As part of its mission, USAFE-AFAFRICA commands U.S. Air Force units pledged to NATO, maintaining combat-ready wings based from the United Kingdom to Turkey. USAFE-AFAFRICA plans, conducts, controls, coordinates and supports air and space operations in Europe, parts of Asia and all of Africa with the exception of Egypt to achieve U.S. national and NATO objectives based on taskings by the two combatant commanders.

USAFE-AFAFRICA is headquartered at Ramstein Air Base, Germany. It is the oldest continuously active USAF major command, originally activated on 1 February 1942 at Langley Field, Virginia, as the Eighth Air Force of the United States Army Air Forces (USAAF). Two years later, it was designated as United States Strategic Air Forces in Europe (USSTAF) and on 7 August 1945 it was designated as United States Air Forces in Europe (USAFE). On 20 April 2012 it formally assumed its current designation when the Seventeenth Air Force inactivated.

The command has more than 35,000 active duty personnel, Air Reserve Component personnel, and civilian employees assigned.

== Origins ==
The origins of USAFE can be traced to 19 January 1942, with the establishment of Eighth Air Force. Eighth Air Force was activated on 28 January at Savannah Army Air Base, Georgia. On 5 May, Major General Carl Spaatz assumed command of HQ Eighth Air Force. On 8 January, the order activating the "U.S. Air Forces in the British Isles" (USAFBI) was announced. On 12 May, the first contingent of USAAF personnel arrived in England to join the Eighth Air Force. On 15 June, Spaatz arrived in England to establish Headquarters, Eighth Air Force at Bushy Park, 15 miles (24 km) west-south-west of London.

Eighth Air Force controlled:

- VIII Bomber Command (Established 19 January 1942)

Strategic bombardment using heavy, four-engined bombers.

- VIII Fighter Command (Established 19 January 1942)

Provide fighter escort of heavy bombers

- VIII Air Support Command (Established 24 April 1942)

Provide reconnaissance, troop transport, and tactical bombardment using twin-engine medium bombers.

- VIII Air Service Command (Established 1942, name changed to VIII Air Force Service Command by 1943)

Service and logistical support.

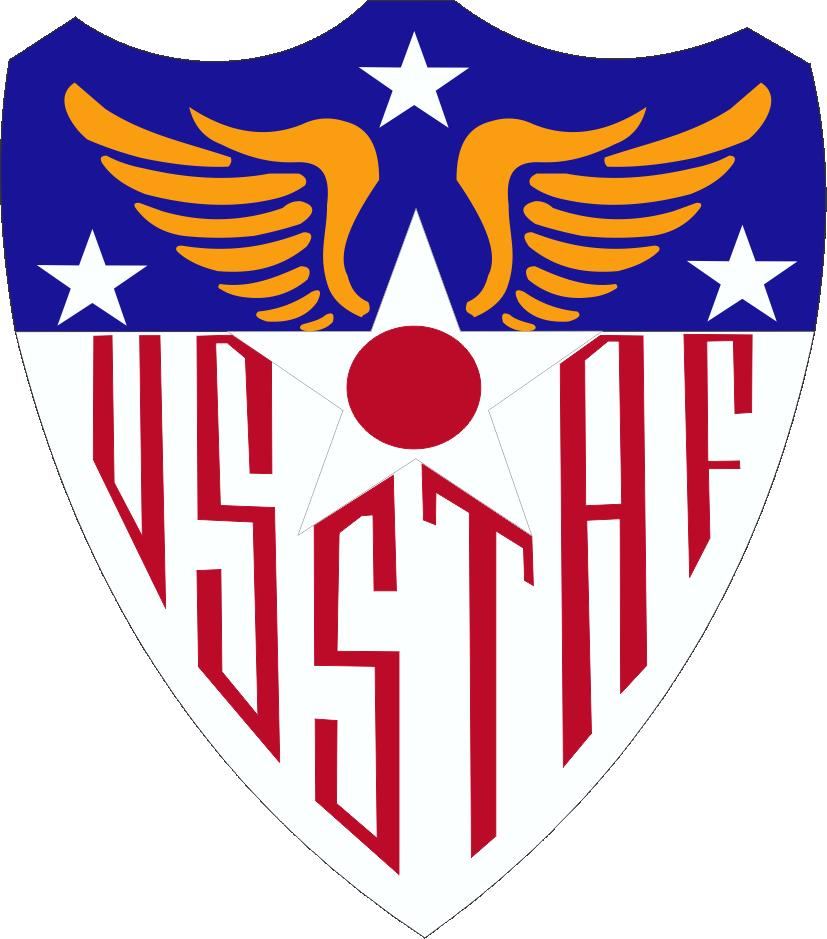
Strategic Air Forces Europe SSI

On 22 February 1944, the Army Air Forces reorganized its commands in Europe. Eighth Air Force was redesignated as United States Strategic Air Forces in Europe (USSTAF) and VIII Bomber Command was redesignated as Eighth Air Force.

On 7 August 1945, USSTAF was redesignated as United States Air Forces in Europe (USAFE). Its headquarters was relocated from Saint Germain-en-Laye, France, to Lindsey Air Station, Wiesbaden, Germany, on 28 September 1945. Within 18 months of VE-Day, virtually all U.S. armed forces personnel had left Europe except for the Occupation Forces in Germany, Austria, and a small number of U.S. Army troops in Trieste. USAFE had been reduced from a force of 17,000 aircraft and about 500,000 personnel to about 2,000 aircraft and 75,000 personnel. USAFE's four wartime Air Forces were demobilized or reassigned between August and December 1945. In March 1946 USAFE was given the status of a Major Command (MAJCOM).

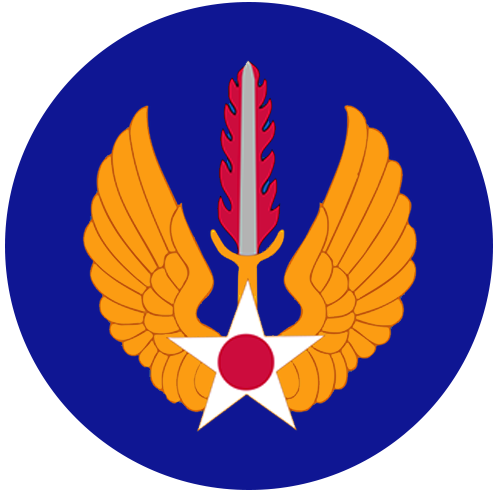
USAAF Europe SSI

A major postwar mission for USAFE was Operation Lusty, in which former Luftwaffe jet aircraft, such as the Messerschmitt Me 262A and Heinkel He 162A were located on various airfields around Munich and shipped to the United States for inspection and evaluation. At Lechfeld Air Base near Augsburg, large numbers of Me 262s were discovered, and valuable German air-to-air rockets. At the Oberpfaffenhofen air base near Munich – the former Dornier factory airfield, and today the home of Germany's DLR aerospace research facility – USAFE found a high-speed Dornier Do 335. This propeller-driven aircraft could reach a speed of 760 km/h, about 100 km slower than the Me 262 jet fighter. Other former Luftwaffe aircraft were collected and simply sent to blast furnaces for metal recycling.

In March 1947, General Joseph T. McNarney, Commanding General, U.S. Forces, European Theatre, told the War Department all he needed was "an Air Force of about 7,500 [men] to provide air transport and communications." He had no need for combat units, which he described as an "administrative burden," and he wanted them withdrawn. Nobody in Washington objected. Thus, the XII Tactical Air Command, the now USAFE combat organization after the inactivation of the four Air Forces, was inactivated on 10 May 1947. By this time, USAFE's fighting force appears to have dropped to a single unit, the 86th Fighter Group, which was shuffled around three separate stations in Germany in 1946–47 as it absorbed the inactivating personnel and equipment of first the 406th Fighter Group and then the 33rd Fighter Group.

In 1945, IX Air Force Service Command was reassigned from Ninth Air Force to USSTAF (about the date IX ASC moved to Erlangen). On 7 October 1946, IX ASC was redesignated European Air Materiel Command. This command administered USAFE's supply and maintenance depots. EAMC was headquartered at Erlangen Air Depot. At Erding Air Depot, it had Detachment B, 4th Air Vehicle Repair Squadron, and the 43d Air Depot. The 10th Air Depot was located at Oberpfaffenhofen Air Depot. The 862d Engineer Aviation Battalion and 837th Engineer Aviation Battalion were located at Landsberg. At Industriehafen Air Depot was Detachment A, 42d Air Repair Squadron. Minor EAMC facilities were located at Bad Wiesse, Wolfgang, Munich, Bruck, Oberwiesenfeld and Bremerhaven. EAMC also controlled ammunition depots at Landesberg, Roth and Zepplenheim. EAMC remained assigned to USAFE until it was inactivated on 15 September 1947.

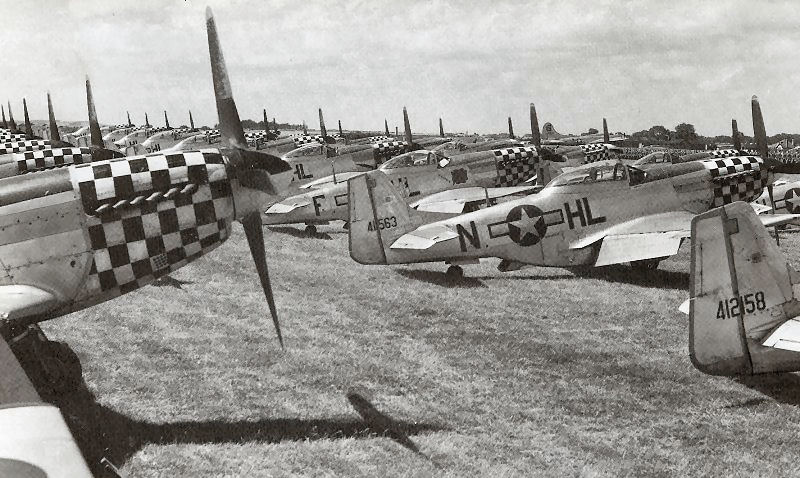
P-51D Mustangs, mostly from the 78th Fighter Group, in storage at RAF Duxford, England, Summer 1945. Most of these aircraft were returned to the United States or used by USAFE units in Germany.

=== European Air Transport Service ===
The European Air Transport Service (EATS), built around the 51st Troop Carrier Wing, controlled C-46, Douglas C-47 Skytrain and C-54 transport aircraft and provided passenger and cargo transport within Western Europe. Its headquarters was at Wiesbaden. It initially controlled the former IX Troop Carrier Command squadrons which remained after the war. EATS operated both cargo and personnel transport routes in non-Communist controlled areas to support the American, British and French occupation forces, along with units in Greece (Athens Airport) and Italy. Known EATS facilities were:

- Bremen Airfield

Flight D, 47th Air Logistics Squadron
371st Air Service Group

- Capodichino Air Base, Naples

2618th HHQ Squadron

- Eschborn Airfield

446th Air Service Group

- Munich-Riem Airfield

464th Air Service Group
60th Troop Carrier Group

- Pisa Air Base, Italy

29th Troop Carrier Squadron

- Rhein-Main Airfield

61st Troop Carrier Squadron

- Tulln Airfield, Austria

313th Troop Carrier Group
91st Airdrome Squadron

- Wiesbaden Airfield

Detachment A, 15th Troop Carrier Squadron

There were also EATS terminals and detachments at Tempelhof Airport, West Berlin, RAF Bovingdon, Hertfordshire, UK, and Paris-Orly Airfield, France.

== Beginning of the Cold War ==
=== Uneasy peace ===
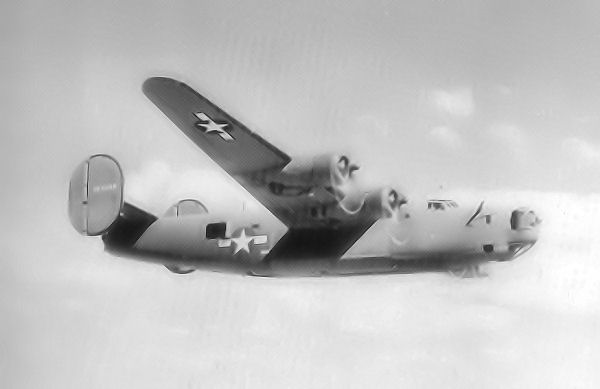
RB-24 reconnaissance aircraft used to carry out "Casey Jones" recon missions. Cameras were mounted in the nose and bomb bay.

Concerned about the massive drawdown of USAFE and the United States Army Europe (USAREUR), the U.S. member of the Allied High Commission for Germany, John J. McCloy, had grave concerns that the troops available would be insufficient to ensure a peaceful transition in the American Zone. The United States' European wartime allies, Britain and France, had also rapidly demobilized.

In preparation for the future, the British Royal Air Force (RAF) and USAFE began a series of mapping flights over Soviet-controlled territory in Germany that led to numerous skirmishes and high tensions. Between the autumn of 1945 and 1947, mapped areas in west and central Europe, North Africa and the Atlantic Islands on a large scale in Operation Casey Jones. Casey Jones flights were made by reconnaissance variant RB-24 Liberators (the former "F-7" variant) and RB-17 Flying Fortresses (formerly called the "F-9"). These flights were only supposed to be flown over the Western Allies occupation zones, but there is a strong suspicion that these aircraft also operated over the Soviet zone. Soviet fighters regularly opened fire on U.S. aircraft operating over their occupation zone. On 22 April 1946, a Douglas C-47 near the Tulln Air Base near Vienna over the Soviet zone of Austria was attacked by Soviet Bell P-39 Airacobra fighters. On 9 August, Yugoslavian fighters opened fire on another USAAF C-47 and forced it to land.

=== Rotation of strategic bombers through Europe ===
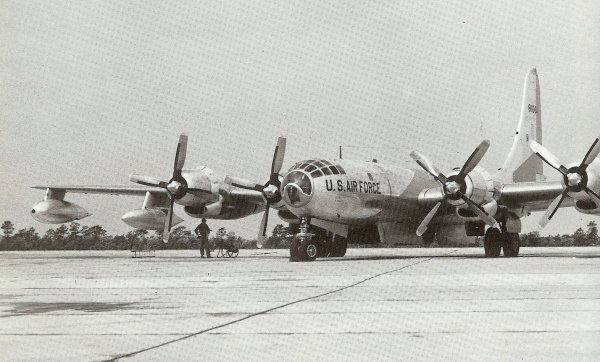
Arrival of SAC KB-50s in Germany, 1946

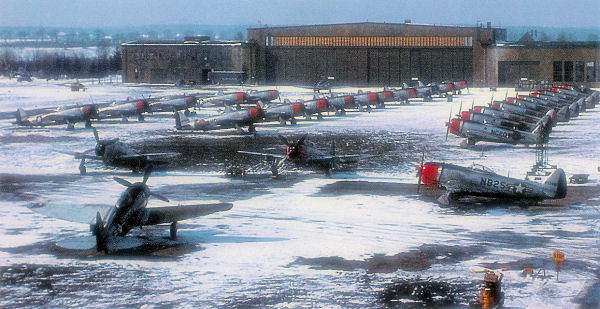
F-47Ds of the 86th Fighter Wing, Neubiberg Air Base, Germany (ca. 1949)

Soviet activity in Eastern Europe unsettled the western allies. President Harry S. Truman decided to take a hard line with Russia, lest the situation evolve into a new war. In Germany, Fürstenfeldbruck Air Base near Munich, Giebelstadt near Würzburg, and Rhein-Main near Frankfurt were rebuilt to accommodate Boeing B-29 Superfortress bombers. Strategic Air Command (SAC) wanted its B-29 fleet as close to the Soviet Union as possible because of their limited range and it was decided to rotate a portion of SAC's B-29 fleet through Europe. In November 1946, six B-29 bombers from SAC's 43d Bombardment Group at Davis-Monthan Air Force Base, Arizona were deployed to RAF Burtonwood, and from there to various bases in Germany as a "training deployment." The B-29s were flown to bases in France, Turkey, Greece and were flown along the borders of Bulgaria and Russia over the Black Sea as part of "show the flag" operations. In May 1947, SAC began additional "training deployments" that stationed a number of B-29s in Germany at Giebelstadt and Fürstenfeldbruck. These B-29 squadrons were constantly rotated back to the United States. being replaced with new squadrons in rotation. SAC also deployed B-29s to the United Kingdom where they were rotated through RAF Marham, RAF Waddington, RAF Scampton and RAF Lakenheath.

The United States also provided military aid to the Greek Air Force to help the postwar Greek government during the Greek Civil War. AT-6 Texan trainers and C-47 Skytrain transport aircraft, along with armored vehicles, small arms weapons, munitions and radar were provided. In Turkey, various intelligence gathering aircraft were deployed along the northern Black Sea coast, providing the United States intelligence about the Soviet Republics of Armenia and Georgia. Overflights of the Soviet Union were also performed.

=== Berlin Airlift ===
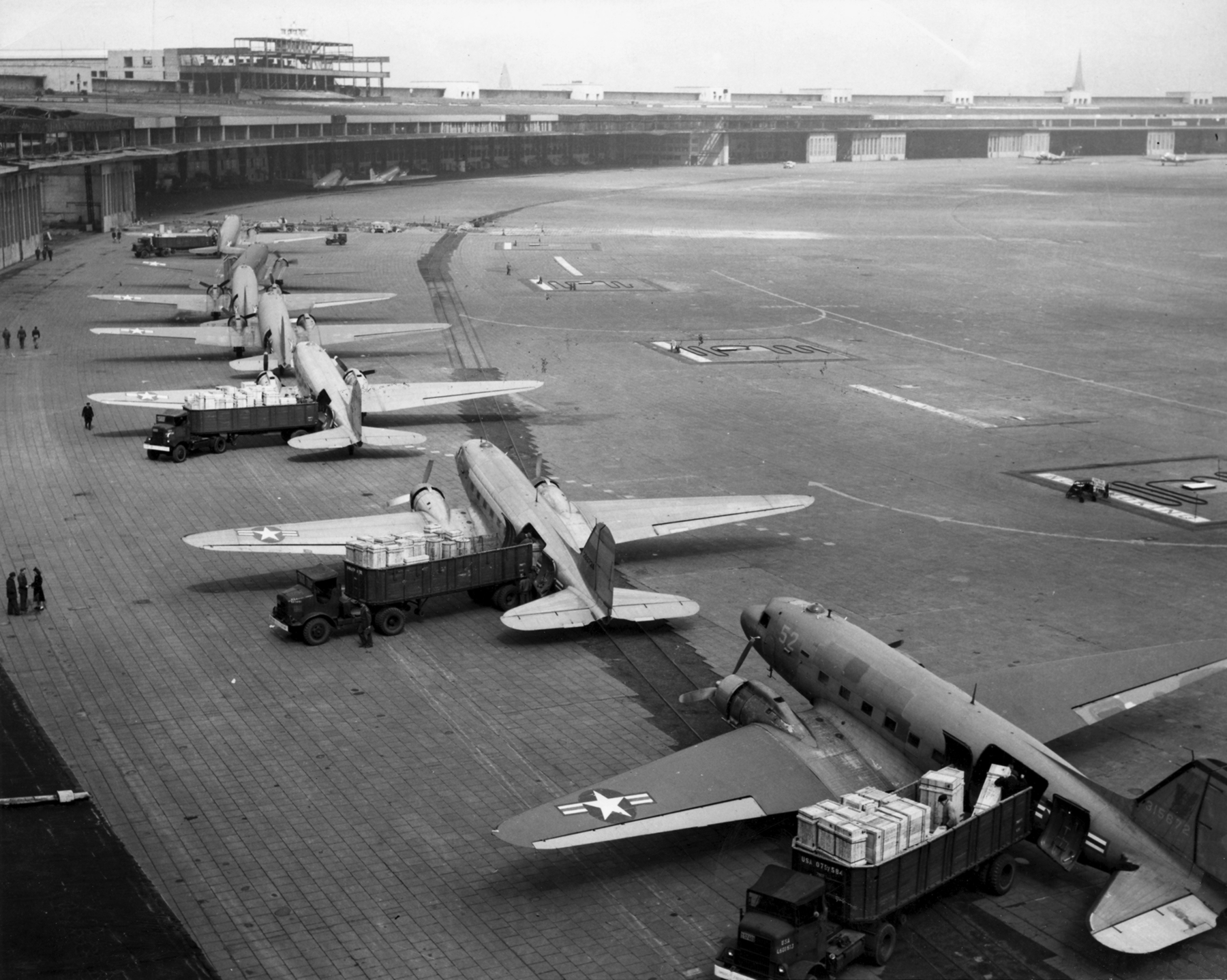
C-47s unloading at Tempelhof Airport during the Berlin Airlift.

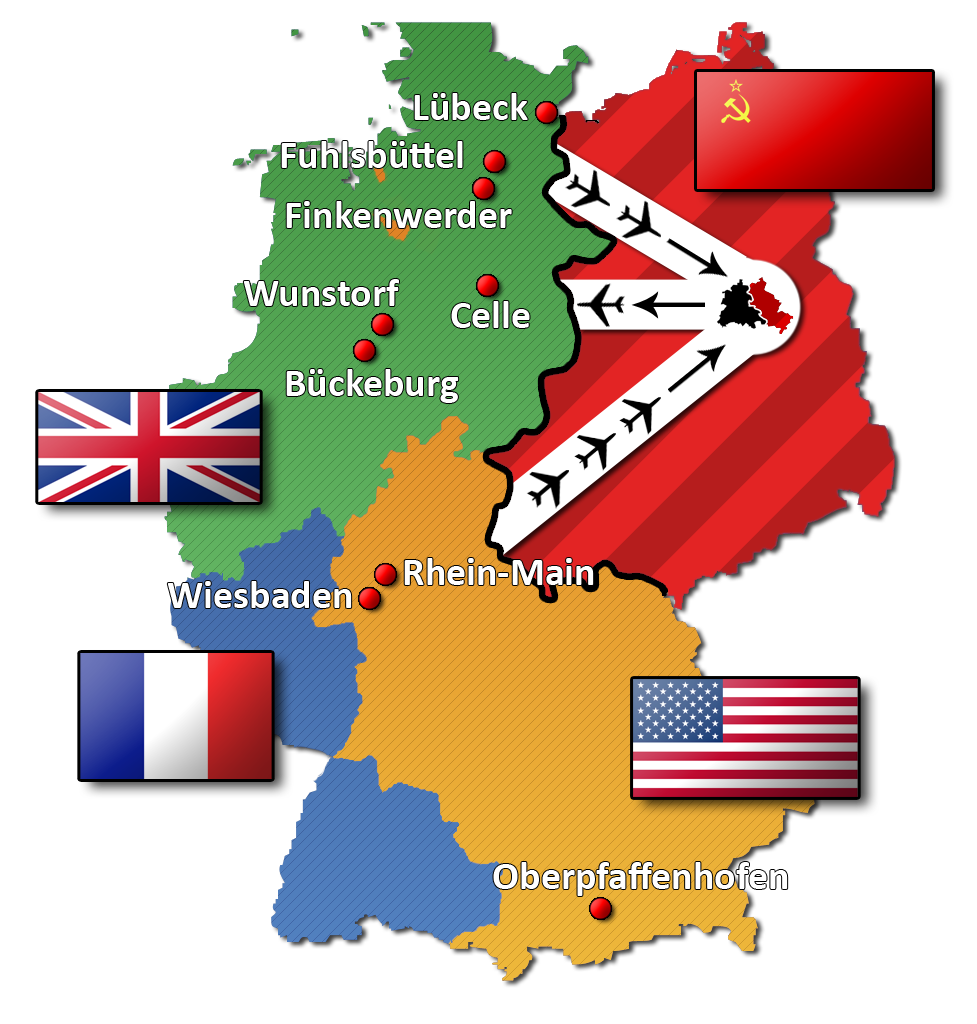
Air corridors to Berlin.

The Berlin Airlift was one of the defining events of and marked the beginning of the Cold War. The 464-day effort to supply a city's needs solely through the air demonstrated the resolve of Western nations to maintain influence in Berlin. The massive humanitarian effort was an early triumph for allied air forces, and symbolized Western commitment to anti-Communist efforts in Europe after World War II.

In 1945 the Soviets, Americans, British and French divided Germany into occupation zones. Berlin, although in the Soviet zone, also was divided among the four powers. On 18 June 1948, the three Western sectors agreed on a new common German currency, coming into force on 20 June, that ended the use of occupation currency and introduced the Deutsche Mark. The Soviets considered this move a breach of agreements reached at the 1945 Potsdam Conference, which stated that Germany would be treated as one economic unit. In response to the currency reform action by the West, on 23 June the Soviets cut off electrical power to a large part of the western sectors of Berlin. The next day, 24 June the Soviet Union blocked western all road, rail and barge access through the Soviet occupation zone of Germany to the three Western-held sectors of Berlin, beginning the Berlin Blockade. The Soviets also now rejected western arguments of their occupation rights in Berlin, and legal claims to unimpeded use of the highways and railroads to the city.

==== USAF mobilization ====
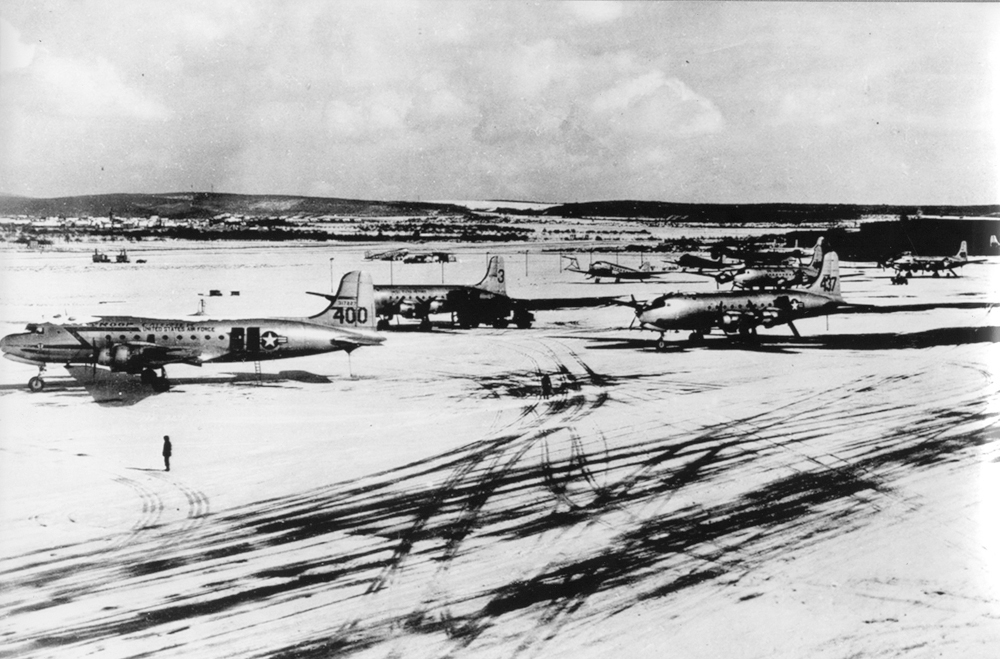
C-54s stand out against the snow at Wiesbaden Air Base during the Berlin Airlift in the Winter of 1948–49

After discussion of military options, the priority was given to supplying Berlin by air, as the Soviet blockade had little effect on the three Berlin air corridors. The Soviet Union did not initially interfere with the cargo aircraft flying the Berlin Airlift, as they were convinced that supplying two million Berliners by air was an impossible task. In 1948, USAFE strength was limited. The command consisted of 485 aircraft, with the 60th and 61st Troop Carrier Groups at Rhein-Main and Wiesbaden Air Bases near Frankfurt, both flying C-47s. The only other flying unit was the 86th Fighter Group at Neubiberg Air Base near Munich, with P-47s, which had been activated on 1 July 1948.

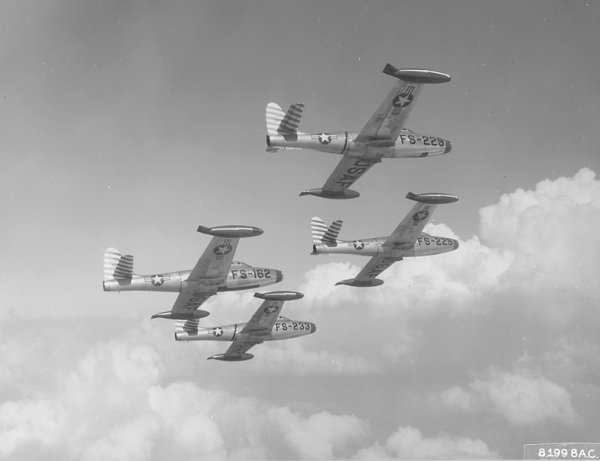
USAAF Republic P-84 Thunderjet jets arriving in Germany 1947 with the 31st Fighter Group

On the morning of 26 June, two days after the blockade began, the first C-47 loaded with milk and medicine took off from Wiesbaden Air Base for Tempelhof Air Base in Berlin. A total of 32 flights were made on that first day. Yet it would take many hundreds of cargo flights each day to provide the 12,000 tons of food, fuel, clothing and medicine estimated to be necessary to sustain the two million people of western Berlin. There were simply not enough C-47s available, as it was estimated that over 900 would be needed to fly the necessary tonnage to Berlin each day. However, if the larger C-54 Skymaster was used, about 180 could supply the cargo necessary. However, there simply weren't that many aircraft available. The Military Air Transport Service (MATS) was ordered to mobilize all available C-54s and C-82 Packets wherever they could in the world to support the airlift, and to refurbish as many as possible of the C-47s in storage at Davis-Monthan AFB for airlift duty. The C-74 Globemaster was also considered for use, as its massive cargo carrying capacity would drastically reduce the number of flights and aircraft necessary. However, the aircraft's landing requirements far exceeded what was available in Berlin, and it was unsafe to land on the short runways. The C-74, however did fly cargo from the United States to staging bases in Europe.

To increase USAFE's tactical air strength, in July 1948 75 Lockheed F-80s were transferred to Germany with the 36th Fighter Group, being assigned to Fürstenfeldbruck Air Base, near Munich. This move considerably increased USAFE's tactical airpower, but also was considered as having great psychological value.

In August 1948, 10 C-54s arrived in Germany to begin airlift service. In addition, civilian Douglas DC-4s were loaned to the USAF for airlift duty. The United States Navy provided 21 R-5Ds, their version of the C-54 as well. The airfields at Rhein-Main and Wiesbaden began to fill to capacity with planes, and the decision was made to also use Royal Air Force airfields at Celle and Faßberg. The USAF, the U.S. Navy, and the RAF together airlifted more than 2.3 million tons of food, fuel and medical supplies. Most of the tonnage was carried by the USAF. The Berlin Airlift taxed existing USAF resources of cargo aircraft, aircraft engines, skilled aircrews, and maintenance personnel.

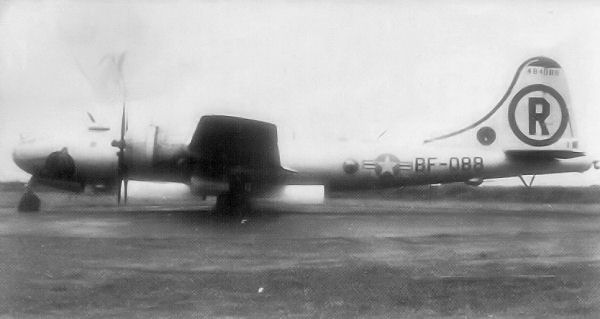
Bell-Atlanta B-29-60-BA Superfortress, AF Ser. No. 44-84088, assigned to the 718th Bomb Squadron (28th BW) at RAF Scampton, 1948

Strategic Air Command reassessed its B-29 forward deployments after the Berlin crisis arose. After initial forward deployments to Goose Bay Air Base in Newfoundland, and consideration of basing the bombers in Germany, it was decided to send them to RAF bases in Britain where they would be less vulnerable. The 28th and 307th Bombardment Groups were deployed to the newly activated station at RAF Marham.

===== Soviet reaction =====
After a few months it was clear to the Soviets that the Americans were succeeding in supplying the western sectors of Berlin with the minimal amount of supplies necessary to sustain it. Mock attacks by Soviet Air Force fighters begun in the air corridors to scare the American pilots caused great confusion and considerably increased the danger of air collisions. Also as many Yakovlev and Lavochkin fighters as possible were assembled around Berlin and then flown en masse in a westerly direction though the corridors. Near the western border of the Soviet occupation zone, they peeled off and flew along the zone border to the next corridor so they could fly back to Berlin along it, against the traffic, to their airfields around Berlin. Western radio frequencies were jammed and chaff was released to confuse radar operators. Searchlights were shone on aircraft in the corridors at night. By the spring of 1949, USAFE announced that there were incidents of Soviets firing at cargo aircraft with anti-aircraft artillery, and of barrage balloons being allowed to float within the corridors. No serious aircraft accidents occurred as a result.

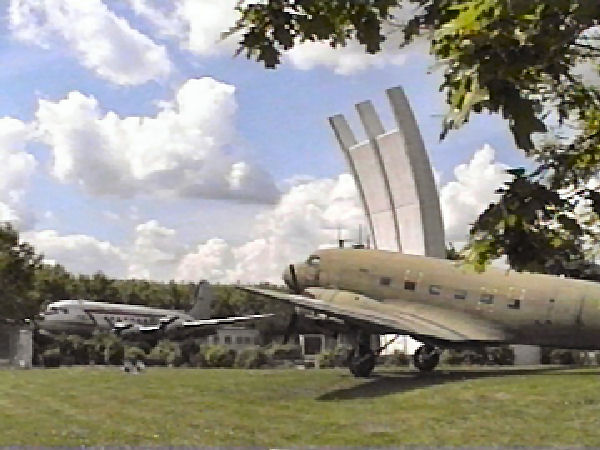
Memorial to Berlin Airlift at the former Rhein-Main Air Base, showing a C-47 and C-54, taken 1975.

The efforts of many hundreds of pilots and the many thousands of military and German civilians involved in the airlift kept the people of Berlin supplied. On one day, the Berlin Airlift delivered nearly 13,000 tons of provisions with almost 1,400 flights. So great was the stream of aircraft that an aircraft landed almost once a minute at one of the three western Berlin airfields. The continuous engine noise of the aircraft stream of heavy transports not only made an impression on the citizens of Berlin, but on the Soviet Union.

The Soviet Union came to realize that the blockade of Berlin would not achieve the desired political effect they wished. On 12 May 1949, the Soviet blockade was lifted. However the airlift operated at a reduced level until the end of September to ensure adequate supplies were available in Berlin in case of a re-imposition of the blockade.

== 1950s ==
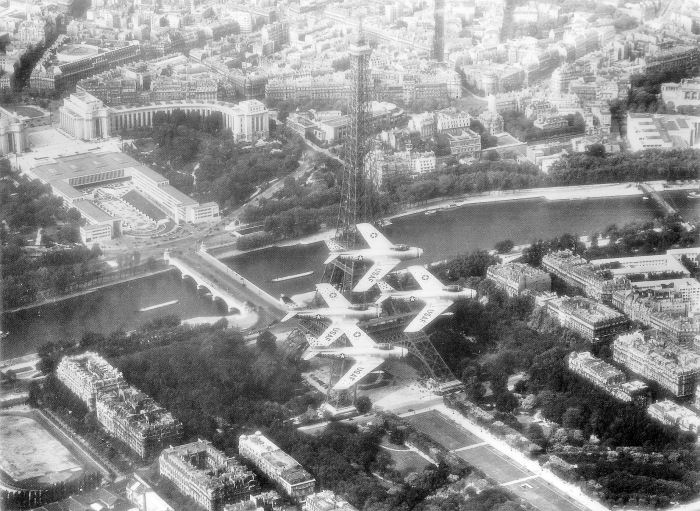
F-86Fs of the USAFE 48th Fighter-Bomber Wing Skyblazers aerobatic team at Chaumont-Semoutiers Air Base performing over Paris – 1955

Even with the Korean War raging in the early 1950s, Europe received a higher priority of air power than Korea by the Truman Administration and the Department of Defense. In September 1950, the NATO Military Committee called for an ambitious buildup of conventional forces to meet the Soviets, subsequently reaffirming this position at the February 1952 meeting of the North Atlantic Council in Lisbon. This meeting established a goal of ultimately fielding 96 divisions in the event of a conventional war in 1954. As part of this buildup USAFE was intended to expand from 16 wings totaling 2,100 aircraft, to 28 wings, 22 of them in the Allied Forces Central Europe area alone, backed by deployed Strategic Air Command units sent from the United States.

The USAF transferred thirteen combat wings from Tactical Air Command plus one air depot wing from Air Materiel Command, and relocated the units to USAFE during the period from April 1951 through December 1954. Eight wings were regular Air Force wings, four wings were federalized Air National Guard units, and one wing was a mobilized Air Force Reserve unit. Four of these wings deployed to the United Kingdom, three into West Germany, and six wings were deployed to France. These wings numbered approximately 500 fighters, 100 light bombers, 100 tactical reconnaissance aircraft, 100 tactical airlift transports, and 18,000 personnel.

Along with these new units from the United States, USAFE moved its forces in West Germany to the west of the River Rhine. Existing bases in Bavaria (Erding Air Depot, Fürstenfeldbruck, Landsberg, Kaufbeuren and Neubiberg Air Bases) were deemed too vulnerable to Soviet attack and were closed by 1960.

On 1 March 1954, Air Materiel Force, European Area was activated at Lindsey Air Station and assigned to USAFE. However, Air Materiel Command finally attained global responsibility for USAF logistics support, and AMF, European Area was transferred to it on 1 January 1956. As part of this realignment, HQ Spain Air Material Area was also reassigned to AMF, European Area. AMC moved AMF European Area to Chateauroux Air Station in May 1958.

From 1954, USAFE built up a large training organization with the primary mission of training the new West German Luftwaffe. Training squadrons were first expanded to groups and then quickly expanded into wings (3-4 groups). In June 1955, the 7330th Flying Training Wing was organized. The 7351st Flight Training Group was redesignated as a wing. The 7331st Technical Training Group was reorganized as a wing in April 1955 at Kaufbeuren Air Base. Because building the German Air Force was a high priority, a new supervisory headquarters was required. On 1 July 1955 the USAFE Training Headquarters, Provisional, was established, responsible for the three Luftwaffe training wings.

In 1955, the force structure was as follows:

Wiesbaden Air Base, FRG – HQ USAFE/7110th Air Base Group

- United Kingdom:

RAF Alconbury – 86th Bombardment Squadron
RAF Bentwaters – 81st Fighter-Interceptor Wing
RAF Burtonwood – 59th Air Depot Wing
RAF Manston – 123d Fighter-Bomber Wing
RAF Molesworth – 582d Air Resupply Group
RAF Sculthorpe – 47th Light Bomb Wing
RAF Shepherds Grove – 78th Fighter Bomber Squadron
RAF Wethersfield – 20th Fighter-Bomber Wing
RAF Woodbridge – 79th Fighter-Bomber Squadron

- West Germany:

Rhein-Main AB – 433d Troop Carrier Wing
Sembach AB – 66th Tactical Reconnaissance Wing
Hahn AB – 50th Fighter-Bomber Wing
Bitburg AB – 36th Fighter-Bomber Wing
Ramstein/Landstuhl AB – 86th Fighter-Interceptor Wing
Spangdahlem AB – 10th Tactical Reconnaissance Wing
Tempelhof AB (West Berlin) – 7350th Air Base Group
USAFE Training Headquarters, Provisional

7330th Flying Training Wing – Fürstenfeldbruck Air Base
7331st Technical Training Wing – Kaufbeuren Air Base
7351st Flying Training Wing – Landsberg-Lech Air Base

- France: (See United States Air Force in France)

Bordeaux AB – 126th Light Bomb Wing
Chambley AB – 21st Fighter-Bomber Wing
Châteauroux AB – 73d Air Depot Wing
Chaumont AB – 48th Fighter-Bomber Wing
Dreux AB – 60th Troop Carrier Wing
Etain AB – 388th Fighter-Bomber Wing
Évreux AB – 322d Air Division
Laon AB – 38th Tactical Bombardment Wing
Phalsbourg AB – 23d Helicopter Squadron
Toul AB – 465th Troop Carrier Wing

- Netherlands:

Soesterberg AB – 32d Fighter-Day Squadron

Erding, Landsberg, and Neubiberg Air Bases, although nominally under USAF control, were being used to train West German Luftwaffe pilots. When training was complete, the bases were turned over to West German control. The last of these bases were turned over by 1960. Erding Air Base was shared by USAFE interceptors briefly in the early 1970s.

2d Air Division was active at Dhahran Air Base in Saudi Arabia by 1954. By 1960, USAFE controlled additional air bases in French Morocco, Wheelus in Libya, Greece, Turkey, Italy, and Spain.

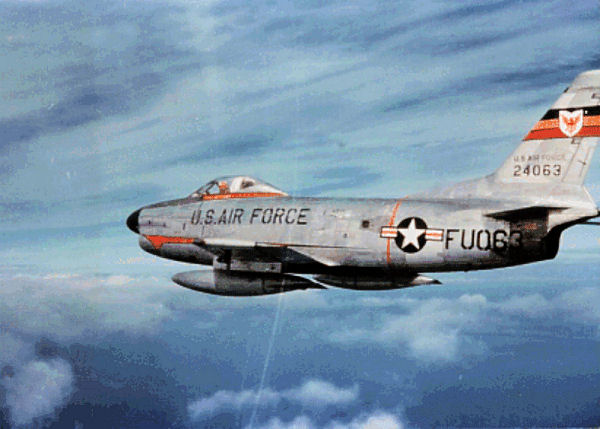
F-86D, AF Ser. No. 52-4063, of the 513th Fighter Interceptor Squadron, Phalsbourg-Bourscheid Air Base, France – 1958 performing air defense duties in Europe.

On 4 November 1956, Soviet troops invaded Hungary, after the 1956 Hungarian Revolution. In response, the United States deployed sixteen Convair B-36 Peacemaker bombers to RAF Burtonwood in the United Kingdom. It is still unknown if the B-36s were armed with nuclear weapons. Several temporary SAC Operation Reflex deployments of Boeing B-47 Stratojet bombers were also made to bases in the United Kingdom and North Africa.

== 1960s ==
=== 1961 Berlin Crisis ===
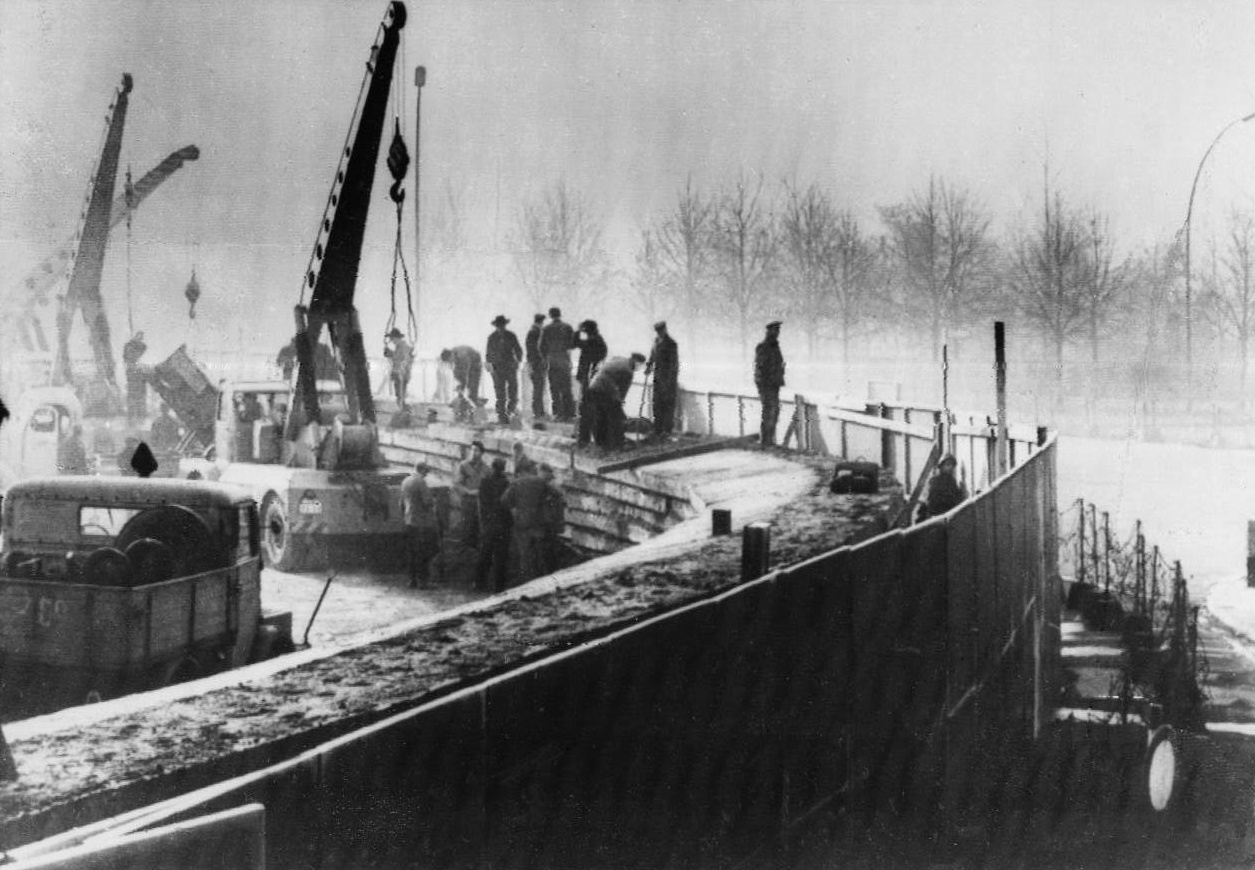
East German construction workers building the Berlin Wall, 20 November 1961.

The 1961 Berlin Crisis became USAFE's first test of what was known as a "Flexible Response" strategy. In the spring of 1961, Soviet Premier Nikita Khrushchev decided that the Soviet Union would sign a peace treaty with the East German government. In effect the German Democratic Republic would control the Russian zone of Berlin and could end joint occupation of the city. This action was a clear violation of the Potsdam Agreement of 1945.

When the Western allies objected to this proposed peace treaty, Khrushchev began speaking about restricting the West's aerial access to Berlin and preventing the entry of East Germans into the city. This possibility started an exodus of Germans from the eastern zone as they rushed to leave their sector and relocate in West Germany.

Departures snowballed from a few dozen refugees daily to a flow of 4,000 per day by August 1961. On the night of 12 August 1961 the Soviet backed East German government began erecting the Berlin Wall to prevent this flow of workers from communism, precipitating a new Cold War crisis that had been brewing for the previous twelve months. Berlin became a divided city. The response agreed to by the Kennedy Administration was to rapidly increase tactical airpower in Europe during the summer of 1961.

The USAFE responded with a two-phase deployment of reinforcements to Europe – the largest such overseas movement of aircraft since World War II. The first phase began on 5 September with Operation Tack Hammer. Tactical Air Command launched eight F-100D Super Sabre squadrons from its Composite Air Strike Force to augment USAFE strength with 144 fighters. All Tack Hammer fighters moved across the Atlantic Ocean with aerial refueling en route. The TACK HAMMER deployment was an interim measure until ANG units could relieve Tactical Air Command squadrons. The Air National Guard was tasked to supply six tactical fighter wings and one tactical reconnaissance wing to expand USAFE. Also deployed to Europe was the ANG 152d Tactical Control Group consisting of six Tactical Control Squadrons, manned by 230 officers and 1,850 airmen with mobile ground radar and radio equipment to control tactical air power on the battlefield. It was dispersed throughout West Germany.

The second phase began with the movement of eleven Air National Guard squadrons in late October and November 1961. Operation Stair Step was the code name for the rapid aerial movement of the fighters to Europe. Aircraft supplied by ANG wings totaled one hundred tour F-84Es, twenty RF-84Fs, seventy-eight F-86Hs, and seventy-two F-104As. The majority of the fighters arrived on 4 November and amazingly had no losses en route. The F-84E and F-86Fs were considered old and obsolete aircraft even though they were only seven to nine years out of the factory. The three F-104 squadrons were activated on 1 November 1961. They disassembled their Starfighters and loaded them into Military Air Transport Service C-124s which delivered them to air bases in Germany and Spain.

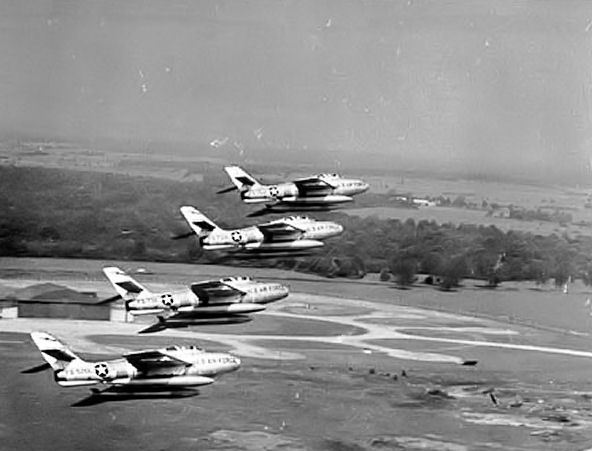
F-84Fs from the activated Air National Guard's 7108th Tactical Wing in formation over Chaumont-Semoutiers Air Base, France. With the end of the Berlin Crisis, these aircraft were reassigned to the 366th Tactical Fighter Wing.

The primary combat mission of the Stair Step units was air superiority and offensive tactical air support operations using conventional munitions to defend West Germany if a war developed over Berlin access. Upon arrival in Europe their missions consisted of command inspections, theater flying training, air-ground close support operations, gunnery training, photo missions, and air defense alert duty. Though equipped with conventional weapons, the Stair Step F-84F and F-86H squadrons maintained their proficiency to deliver nuclear weapons by practicing toss bombing. By March 1962, the Berlin Crisis was subsiding and plans were being made for departure of the ANG wings from Europe. Units were to return all personnel, equipment, and aircraft to CONUS by 1 September 1962 for early release from active duty.

However, the Berlin Wall was built and a barbed wire fence with minefields extended the entire north–south length of a divided Germany. The wall effectively isolated East Germany for the next twenty-eight years. But the American, British, and French Zones still remained in Berlin and access to the city was not challenged again. Tack Hammer and Stair Step forces had served their purpose; their rapid deployment to France had unequivocally demonstrated the United States' determination to defend Berlin.

Beginning about 1963 due to the Vietnam War, USAFE/NATO's total strength steadily declined, as the U.S. reduced forces in Europe to fight a limited war in Southeast Asia for ten years.

=== French withdrawal from NATO's military structure ===
On 7 March 1966, French President Charles de Gaulle announced that France would withdraw from NATO's integrated military structure. He gave NATO forces one year (until 1 April 1967) to depart France. The United States Department of State, Department of Defense, and Air Force carefully managed the news about the American departure from France, and the attendant problems of an integrated NATO air defense for western Europe and the decrease in tactical airpower. However, the news media were focusing on Vietnam, so the removal of NATO forces from France went virtually unreported in the US.

During 1966–67 all USAF offices and facilities in France were closed and personnel and equipment moved to other NATO countries. The last USAFE activities were the 1630th Air Base Squadron at Orly Airport and the Paris Administration Office. Both were closed in June 1967. A C-47 variant, the C-117B "Super Skytrain", was the last USAF aircraft to depart France on 31 May 1967. With the French departure, a major reorganization of USAFE was needed. The 49th TFW's three squadrons at Spangdahlem Air Base, and the 417th TFS of the 50th TFW at Hahn Air Base, were recalled to the US. Although the squadrons were relocated to the US, they were still part of USAFE's permanent force. According to the Department of Defense, these squadrons were 'dual-based'; they could return to their European bases at any given moment without lengthy preparations being necessary.

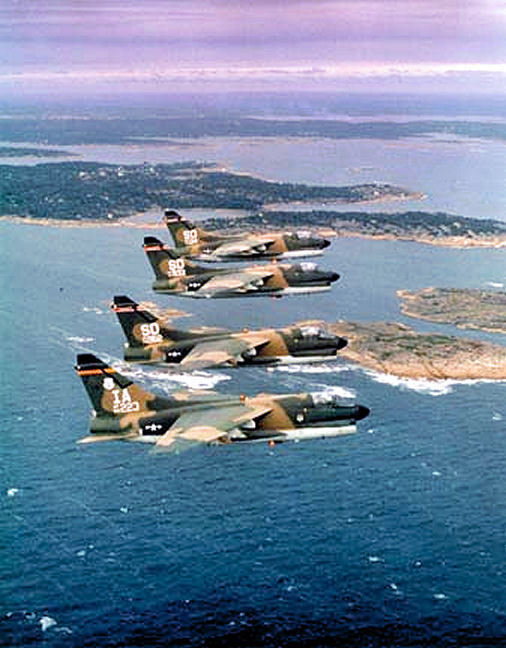
A-7 Corsair II aircraft of the Iowa Air National Guard (tail code IA) and South Dakota Air National Guard (tail code SD) during Crested Cap exercises, 1979

During 1967, the 49th TFW's three squadrons flew back to the US where they were stationed at Holloman Air Force Base, New Mexico. The 417th TFS did not return to the US until 1968, when the squadron was stationed at Mountain Home AFB, Idaho. In 1968, the four squadrons switched over completely to McDonnell Douglas F-4 Phantom IID fighter-bombers and then undertook intensive preparations for their new role within USAFE. The primary task of the four dual-based squadrons was to carry out Project Crested Cap. Crested Cap was the Air Force part of the Army's Exercise REFORGER, during which Army and Air Force units from the U.S. mainland would be deployed to Europe for Allied Forces Central Europe exercises. Most of the heavy equipment such as armoured vehicles, artillery, etc., were shipped by sea to exercise that transportation component. Troops were flown via military and contract transport aircraft.

Although the withdrawal of USAFE forces from France was completed in 1967, it took until the mid-1970s until USAFE fully realigned its forces in Europe. Zweibrücken AB in West Germany and RAF Upper Heyford in England came under USAFE control within the next several years. Older reconnaissance and fighter aircraft were redeployed from France to Southeast Asia to supplement the U.S. Pacific Air Forces engaged in the Vietnam War.

=== USAFE in Spain ===
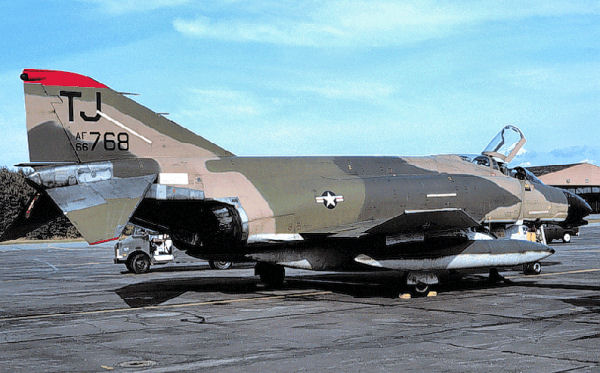
McDonnell F-4C-23-MC Phantom II, AF Ser. No. 66-0768, of the 307th TFS / 401st Tactical Fighter Wing, Torrejon Air Base, Spain. (Photo taken at Ramstein Air Base, West Germany)

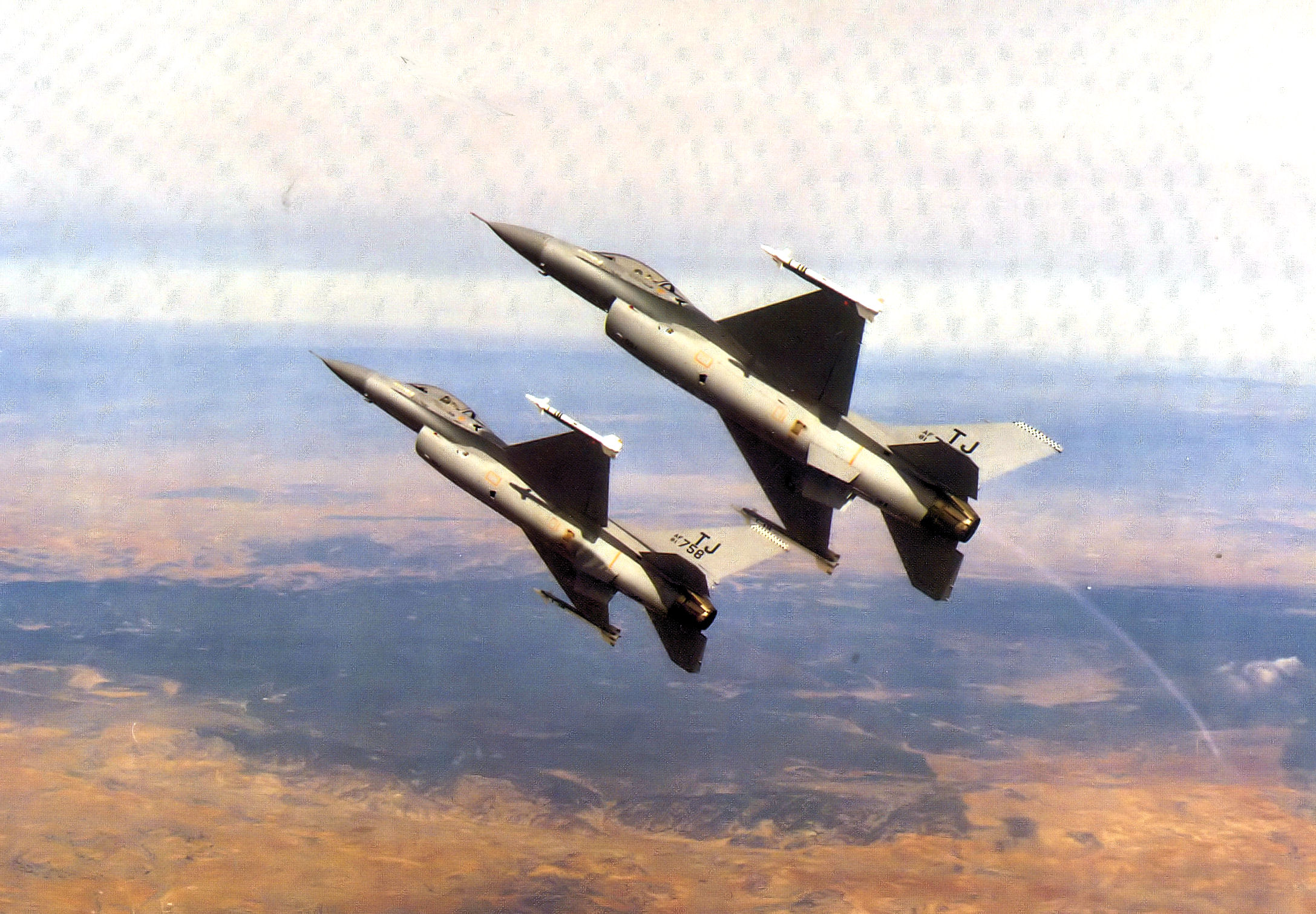
General Dynamics F-16A Block 15H Fighting Falcons of the 615th Tactical Fighter Squadron / 401st TFW Torrejon Air Base, Spain

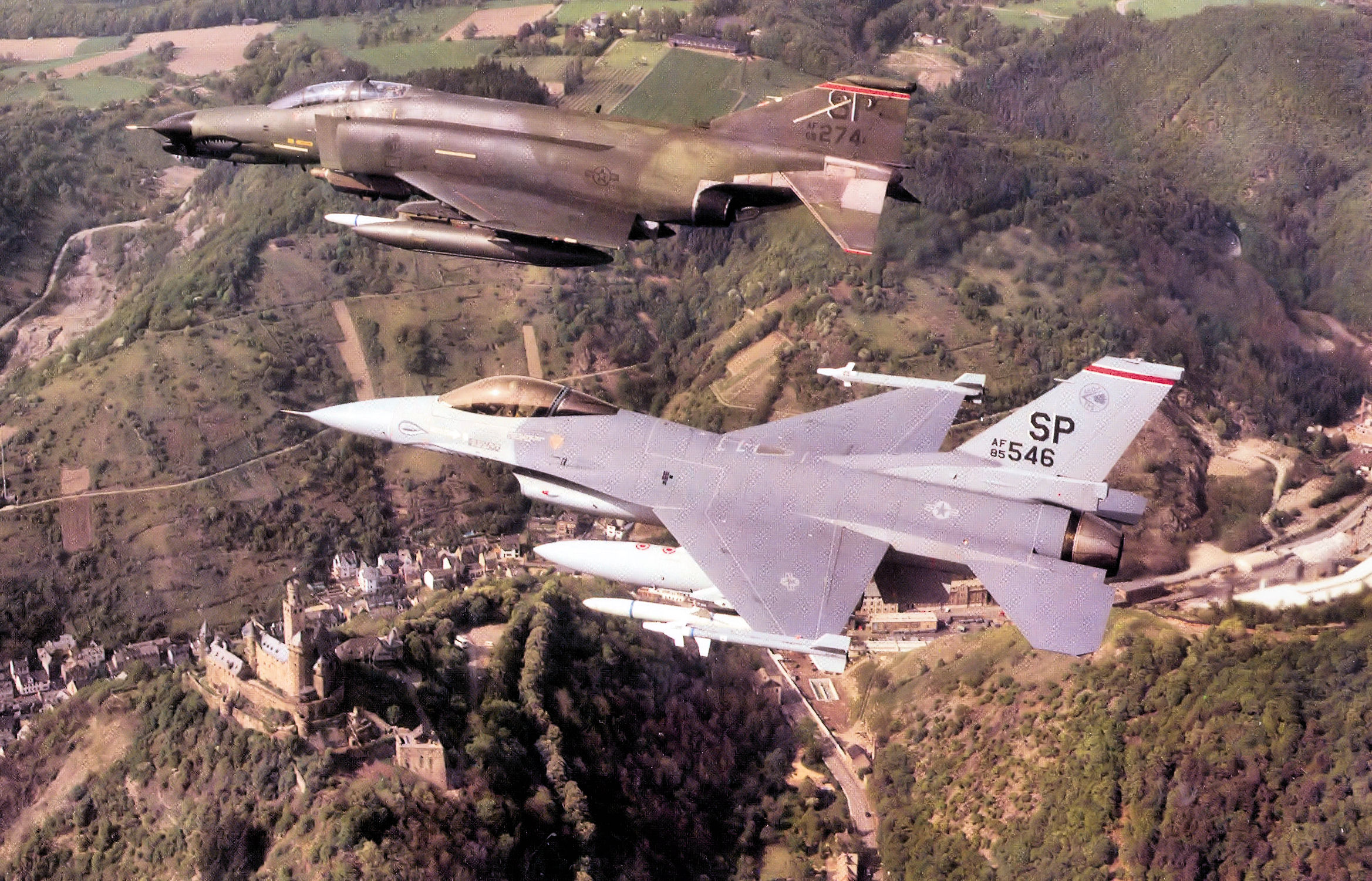
F-4G and F-16C aircraft of the 52d Tactical Fighter Wing, Spangdahlem AB, West Germany, c. 1987

Before Spain joined NATO in 1982, the USAF had for many years used Spanish air bases. Initially used primarily by the Strategic Air Command, they were Morón Air Base, at Morón near Sevilla in southern Spain, and Torrejón Air Base at Torrejón near Madrid. The Spanish air bases were important for reinforcing USAFE via the southern Atlantic route. Aircraft that flew to Europe via Lajes Field in the Azores always made a refueling stop at Morón, and later at Torrejon as well. These bases also had American facilities for carrying out aircraft maintenance and repairs. Yet it was primarily the good weather that drew USAFE to Spain for weapons training, which at that time was still mainly held in Libya utilizing the ranges at Wheelus Air Base.

After June 1960, when SAC's 65th Air Division was transferred to USAFE, the footprint of USAFE's activities in Spain increased significantly. Two interceptor squadrons equipped with F-102 Delta Daggers were formed, the 431st Fighter-Interceptor Squadron (431 FIS) being stationed at Zaragoza Air Base and the 497th FIS at Torrejon AB. As compensation for the permanent use of these Spanish bases, the CASA aircraft factory at Morón AB was brought in to maintain the F-102A air defense fighters that the USAFE had stationed in Spain, Germany and the Netherlands.

As the American-Libyan relationship worsened throughout the second half of the 1960s, a growing number of USAFE fighter-bomber squadrons in England and Germany went to Zaragoza and gunnery ranges in Spain for weapons training. Zaragoza later became an important weapons training site for the USAFE and was also visited by F-15 Eagle squadrons for "Dissimilar Air Combat Training". During these air combat training exercises, the F-15s often practiced against Spanish Air Force Dassault Mirage F-1 fighters.

In April 1966, the 16th Air Force was transferred from SAC to the USAFE, with USAFE taking control of the Spanish air bases at Zaragoza and Morón. Under USAFE, the Spanish bases became host to a growing number of deployments from CONUS. Morón received regular visits from Lockheed F-104C Starfighters of the 479th TFW from George AFB, California. During the Cuban Missile Crisis, a squadron of F-104Cs was stationed at Morón. Concern at the height of the crisis led to these aircraft being transferred to Hahn Air Base in West Germany, where they strengthened the air defense of central Europe. Some time later, when the crisis had passed, the aircraft returned to the US via Morón. On 1 April 1963, their place was taken by F-105D "Thunderchief" fighter-bombers from the 4th TFW at Seymour Johnson AFB, North Carolina.

During the mid-1960s, the 16th Air Force also gradually took over responsibility for all USAFE operations around the Mediterranean.

=== USAFE in Turkey ===
The U.S. Logistics Group (TUSLOG) was the primary USAF agency in Turkey. TUSLOG not only commanded various USAFE units, but also supported all other U.S. military organizations and government agencies in Turkey. TUSLOG was established in 1955 and was headquartered in the Turkish capital of Ankara. The 39th Air Base Wing at Incirlik Air Base near Adana supported training deployments and regional exercises; communications for National Command Authority taskings; providing support for various units and an Air Mobility Command tenant unit providing air transport of passengers and cargo. From the 1950s – 1970s, the 39th supported various SAC activities in Turkey, which used Incirlik intensively as a base for U-2 reconnaissance flights along the Soviet border and in the Middle East.

In Ankara, the 7217th Air Base Group managed the logistical support for more than 40 units and agencies, as well as the needs of the American Embassy and U.S. Defense Attaché Office. From Izmir Air Station, the 7266th Air Base Group supported the two NATO headquarters, Allied Land Forces South-Eastern Europe (LANDSOUTHEAST) and the Sixth Allied Tactical Air Force (6 ATAF). The 7241st Air Base Group was the only U.S. military unit in Turkey not located at a single site, but was scattered about İzmir in various locations.

In 1966, Senate majority leader Mike Mansfield began a campaign to unilaterally reduce U.S. troop levels in Europe. Following this, Secretary of Defense Clark Clifford initiated a program for the Reduction of Costs and Forces in Europe (REDCOSTE) in 1968. Although a change in administrations occurred in the same year, this program conformed to the Nixon Administration policy of lowering the profile of American forces abroad. Consequently, the U.S. began to eliminate or consolidate many of its operations in Turkey. Between 1969 and 1973, sites at Samsun and Trabzon were turned over to the Turkish government. In addition, Cigli Air Base, which since 1963 had been used by USAF rotational squadrons, was turned over to the Turkish Air Force in 1970. The U.S. continued, however, to fund the maintenance of numerous facilities there. Altogether, between 1967 and 1970, the number of Americans in Turkey dropped from 24,000 to 15,000.

The cutbacks in forces in Turkey naturally had a major effect on TUSLOG. The headquarters in Ankara shrank to a fraction of its former size. On 9 September, it was inactivated as the 7217th Air Division and the next day reestablished as Detachment 1 of Headquarters, Sixteen Air Force.

== 1970s and 1980s ==
Changes continued through the early 1970s. Headquarters USAFE transferred from Lindsey Air Station, Germany, to Ramstein Air Base in March 1973 and NATO's Allied Air Forces Central Europe was established at Ramstein Air Base in June 1974. The USAFE commander in chief then took command of Allied Air Forces Central Europe, in addition to commanding U.S. Air Force units in Europe.

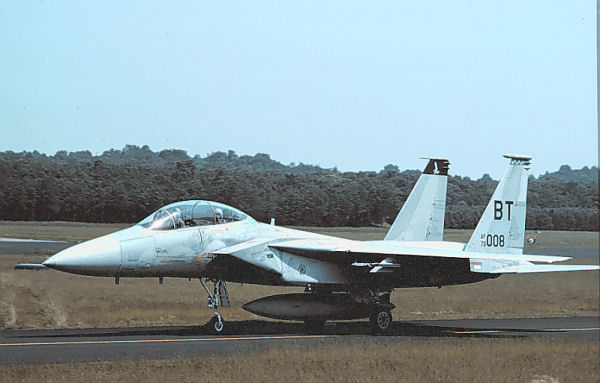
McDonnell Douglas F-15D-25-MC Eagle, AF Ser. No. 79-0008 of the 525th Tactical Fighter Squadron at Bitburg Air Base, West Germany

In 1976, the new McDonnell Douglas F-15A Eagle air superiority fighter was introduced into USAFE service. The Soviet Union's new MiG and Sukhoi fighters made the U.S. Department of Defense anxious. The Mikoyan-Gurevich MiG-25 'Foxbat' made them pull out all the stops to get the F-15A into USAFE. The F-15A was deployed to Germany in April 1977 with the 36th TFW at Bitburg Air Base West Germany. The 32nd TFS at Soesterberg AB Netherlands was also upgraded to the McDonnell-Douglas F-15A Eagle as part of Project Ready Eagle. By 1986, all USAFE F-4 wings were replaced by F-15 and F-16 fighters. The 36th TFW's existing F-4E Phantoms were incorporated into three new USAFE squadrons which were established at Hahn Air Base (313th TFS), Spangdahlem Air Base (480th TFS) and Ramstein Air Base (512th TFS). Preparations for the switch to the F-15 went ahead at full speed. Its introduction to the USAFE was given the project name Ready Eagle and, naturally, included transition training for the USAFE pilots.

This retraining was the joint responsibility of USAFE and TAC and first began in January 1976 at Langley AFB, Virginia, where the 1st TFW, was stationed. At Langley AFB, the USAFE's future F-15 pilots were given a crash course that familiarized them with the new aircraft in a relatively short time. The first F-15As arrived at Bitburg AB on 7 January 1977. These were two TF-15A (later redesignated as F-15B) trainers that had flown non-stop from Langley AFB in seven and a half hours.

These Eagles were to be used primarily for ground crew familiarization in anticipation of the arrival of the 525th TFS's first F-15As. The 23 aircraft for this first operational squadron left Langley AFB on 27 April 1977 for a mass Atlantic crossing. Over the following months, the aircraft for two other squadrons (22nd TFS and 53rd TFS) arrived. The 36th TFW's full strength of 79 fully operational F-15As was reached in December 1977. Project Ready Eagle was completed in precisely one year.

However, after flying the F15A and F-15B for just 18 months, the USAFE exchanged these models for the newer F-15C and F-15D Eagles. In May 1980, the 32d flew five of its F-15A/B Eagles to Eglin AFB, Florida to participate in the weapons systems evaluation program. While at Eglin AFB, the united swapped its aircraft for the newer models. These planes arrived at Soesterberg AB on 13 June, making the 32d the first unit in the USAFE to be equipped with the latest versions of the F-15. The 32nd completed the upgrade on 25 November 1980. At that time the squadron possessed eighteen F-15C and two twin-seat F-15D fighter aircraft.

On 8 August 1985, a terrorist car bomb attack was made against Rhein-Main Air Base. Two Americans were killed and 23 people, including Germans, were injured. The blast was powerful caused debris and damage to the base including to 30 vehicles, trees and windows.

=== SS-20s pointing at Europe ===
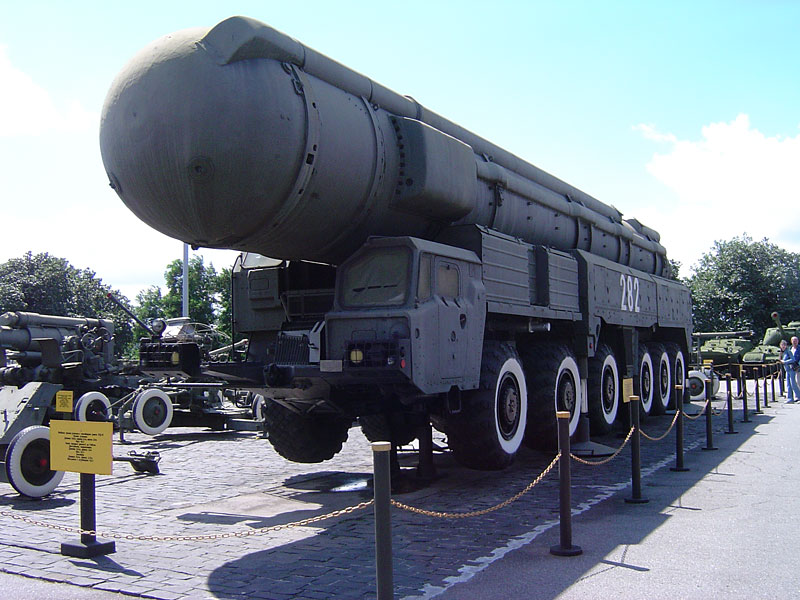
Soviet SS-20 IRBM

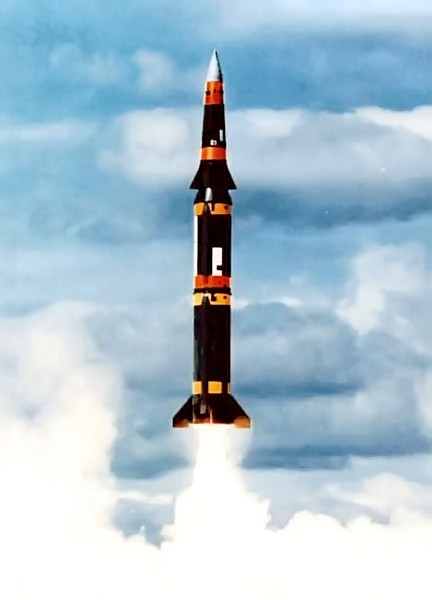
Pershing II IRBM

By 1975, NATO had lost its strategic nuclear lead over the Soviet Union and with the introduction of the Soviet RT-21M Pioneer (NATO designation SS-20 Saber) had even fallen behind. On 12 December 1979, the U.S. decided to deploy 572 new nuclear missiles in Europe: 108 Pershing II missiles to be operated by the U.S. Army and 464 BGM-109G Ground Launched Cruise Missiles, also known as the Gryphon and based on the U.S. Navy's nuclear Tomahawk Land Attack Missile (TLAM-N), to be operated by the USAF. Of the cruise missiles, 160 were stationed in England, 96 in West Germany, 112 in Italy, 48 in the Netherlands, and 48 in Belgium. All 108 Pershings were stationed in West Germany. The second significant aspect of the NATO decision was the readiness to 'horse trade' with the Soviet Union for the reduction or total elimination of these missiles against similar reductions or elimination of the Russian SS-20s.

NATO carried out its plans to station cruise missiles in Europe despite strong protests from the peace movements and heavy diplomatic pressure in the European Parliament. NATO's condition for not carrying out its plans was the Soviet Union's willingness to halt the deployment of mobile SS-20 nuclear missiles aimed at Europe and remove the missiles already deployed. In 1979, when the NATO decision was taken, the Soviet Union had 14 (1 operational) SS-20 launch sites. The eighty Soviet SS-20s located in the Soviet Union were aimed at targets in Western Europe. According to Western estimates, at the beginning of 1986, the Soviet Union already deployed 279 SS-20 launching installations with a total of 837 nuclear warheads.

The first General Dynamics BGM-109 Tomahawk Ground-Launched Cruise Missiles to arrive in Europe went to the 501st Tactical Missile Wing (TMW) at RAF Greenham Common, England. The controversial weapons were delivered by a Lockheed C-141 Starlifter on 14 November 1983. By 1986, there were 32 operational cruise missile launching installations in England (RAF Greenham Common and RAF Molesworth), Belgium (Florennes Air Base), and on Sicily (Comiso Air Base). Because each GLCM launching installation was composed of four weapons, the total number of cruise missiles stationed in Europe was 128.

Disarmament talks between East and West resulted in a disarmament treaty being signed by Soviet Communist Party General Secretary Mikhail Gorbachev and US President Ronald Reagan at the end of 1987 during Gorbachev's visit to the United States. The Soviet Union agreed to dismantle the SS-20s and the American cruise missiles were also to be withdrawn.

The historic Intermediate-Range Nuclear Forces Treaty, ratified in 1988, mandated the first-ever elimination of an entire class of weapons from U.S. and Soviet inventories. USAFE completed removal of the ground-launched cruise missiles and other weaponry on 26 March 1991, when the last 16 missiles were removed from Comiso Air Base, Italy.

== Post–Cold War era ==
USAFE never had to fight the Soviet Armed Forces and the Warsaw Pact states in Europe. The Soviet Union collapsed in 1990–91. The end of the Cold War saw a clamoring for a "peace dividend", and questions from many U.S. and Western European officials about the appropriate size and purpose of American military forces in Europe.

All U.S. and NATO allies' military forces experienced a series of changes over the next five years. USAFE shrunk from over 850 aircraft and 72,000 personnel scattered among 27 bases in 1990 to approximately 240 aircraft, 33,000 personnel, and six flying bases by the end of 1996. In July 1994, with President Clinton in attendance, the British, French, and American air and land forces in Berlin were inactivated in a ceremony on the Four Ring Parade field at Tempelhof Central Airport.

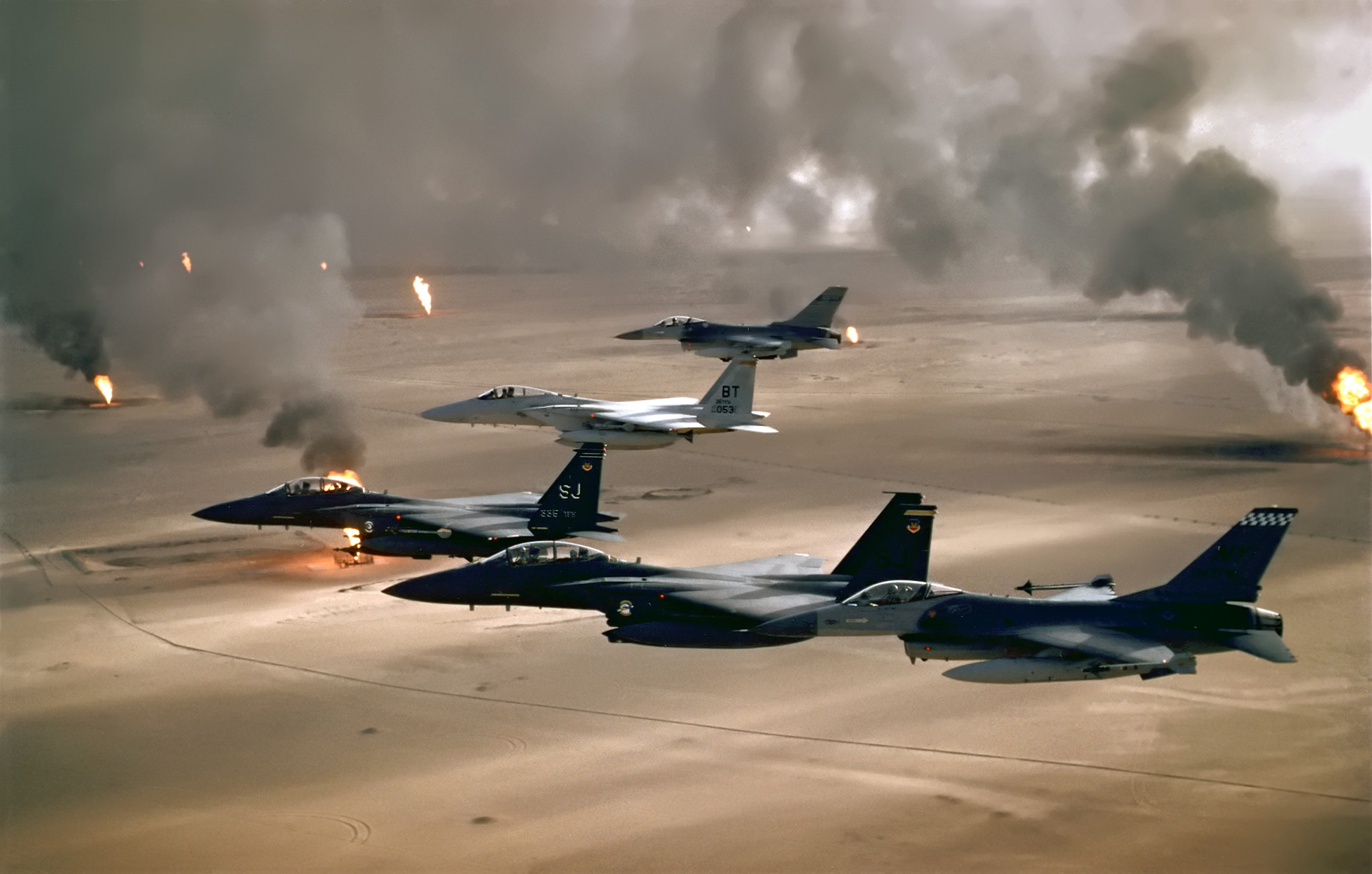
USAFE, TAC, and TAC-gained ANG F-15s and F-16s flying over the Kuwaiti desert – February 1991

=== Iraq and Kuwait in the 1990s ===
With the onset of Operations Desert Shield in August 1990 and Desert Storm in January 1991, more than 180 aircraft and 5,400 personnel assigned to USAFE units deployed to the Persian Gulf area. In conjunction, more than 100 additional aircraft and 2,600 personnel deployed to Turkey for Joint Task Force Proven Force, forming the 7440th Composite Wing (Provisional). A total of 60,000 USAFE personnel were committed to the war effort; however, fewer than 10,000 actually deployed. More than half of the command's aircraft deployed to support Desert Storm.

The command's air support was lethal. For example, USAFE accounted for only 20 percent of the air-to-air assets in Desert Storm, but claimed half of the air-to-air kills. More than 85,000 tons of munitions, including more than 35,000 bombs and 7,800 missiles, were built up in theatre. These were used in countless strike, interdiction and close air support missions.

USAFE activated aeromedical staging facilities and contingency hospitals, increasing available bed space 1,500 percent above normal peacetime operations. More than 9,000 patients, mostly suffering from noncombat-related illnesses and injuries, were evacuated to Europe. More than 3,000 were treated at USAFE medical facilities. Almost 7,600 patients were later air evacuated to the Continental United States for follow-on treatment.

After Desert Storm ended, Kurdish rebels and Iraqi forces continued fighting in northern Iraq. The Kurds began a mass exodus toward Turkey and later Iran. A multi-national effort, including U.S. forces, was slowly established to save lives during Operation Provide Comfort (OPC) and this was mainly done by establishing the Iraqi no-fly zones starting above the 36th parallel in Iraq. The operation immediately began air dropping food and supplies to the refugees. More than 2,400 USAFE personnel were deployed, along with 36 fighter aircraft to provide protection for the transports. In a relatively new role, USAFE used A-10 Thunderbolt II aircraft to spot and mark the pockets of Kurds needing humanitarian relief. As Operation Provide Comfort drew to a close, Kurdish leaders asked for continued protection from the Iraqi Army. Operation Provide Comfort II (OPC II) picked up where the first operation left off, building a multinational rapidly deployable air and ground forces in Turkey ready to defend the Kurds.

Operation Northern Watch (ONW) commenced on 1 January 1997 as the successor to Operation Provide Comfort. It was run by a Combined Task Force (CTF) charged with enforcing a no-fly zone above the 36th parallel in Iraq, with the United States, United Kingdom, and Turkey providing approximately 45 aircraft and more than 1,400 personnel. In addition to USAF airmen, the joint U.S. forces of some 1,100 U.S. personnel, included sailors, soldiers, and Marines, as well as sorties from every air arm of the U.S. armed forces. The USAF portion of ONW was primarily a USAFE operation, since all USAF assets participating operated out of Europe. The USAF portion of the mission was partially flown by rotational aircraft and units from Air Combat Command, Air Mobility Command, Pacific Air Forces, Air Force Special Operations Command, and Air Force Reserve Command, and Air National Guard units operationally-gained by them.

The original mandate from the Turkish government allowed the operation to continue for six months. Turkey subsequently approved two 6-month extensions, but indicated that it would not become a permanent mission. For the first year of the mission, northern Iraq was quiet, with no combat between Coalition aircraft and Iraqi forces.

From December 1998 to March 1999, U.S. and coalition aircraft over northern Iraq came under almost daily fire from Iraqi surface-to-air missile sites and anti-aircraft guns. These aircraft responded by bombing Iraqi air-defense sites which fired on them, utilizing laser-guided bombs as well as AGM-88 HARM missiles and AGM-130 long range air-to-surface missiles. Coalition aircraft flew patrols on an average of 18 days per month, and were usually fired upon. The most common threat was from anti-aircraft guns. Despite Saddam Hussein offering a $14,000 reward for downing a Coalition aircraft, no warplanes were ever shot down. During the first months of 1999, Coalition activity over northern Iraq was temporarily halted as aircraft were moved to Italy to take part in Operation Allied Force.

Low level conflict over Northern Iraq continued up until the 2003 invasion of Iraq, although the number of incidents declined dramatically after 1999. The final ONW combat air patrol occurred on 17 March 2003 from Incirlik Air Base. Six weeks later, the operation concluded with an official stand down on 1 May 2003. A grand total of 36,000 sorties were flown during Operation Northern Watch, and 40,000 personnel had been deployed at some point during the operation. USAFE also sent aircraft and personnel to help man Operation Southern Watch, operating from Saudi Arabia under Central Command Air Forces.

=== Balkans operations ===
USAFE also provided air protection over the skies of Bosnia-Herzegovina in Operation Deny Flight. Along with allies from NATO countries, U.S. aircrews bombed targets in Bosnia-Herzegovina during Operation Deliberate Force, which paved the way for the 1995 Dayton Peace Agreement. USAFE then helped deploy the Implementation Force (I-FOR) and its equipment to Bosnia for Operation Joint Endeavor and sustained them by airlift.

USAFE forces again mobilized in March 1999, when NATO intervened in Kosovo to halt a Yugoslav counter-insurgency targeting the Kosovo Liberation Army. USAFE forces provided air-support for Albanian fighters on the ground. Albanian refugees appeared after the beginning of hostilities. Efforts to find a diplomatic solution collapsed, resulting in Operation Allied Force–the NATO-led air war over Kosovo. The 78-day operation ended 20 June culminating in the withdrawal of Serb forces from Kosovo and the eventual return of refugees. USAFE's 3rd Air Force led Joint Task Force Shining Hope, established to assist the hundreds of thousands of refugees who left Kosovo because of war. USAFE continues to contribute to NATO-led forces promoting peace and stability in Kosovo.

=== Afghanistan and Iraq ===
During the War in Afghanistan, USAFE has supported an air bridge from Europe to Asia that delivered 3,300 tons of humanitarian daily rations to northern Afghanistan, opened the Manus base in Kyrgyzstan, and established a medical evacuation network that moved nearly 4,000 patients. USAFE deployed 24 fighter aircraft, eight KC-135 Stratotankers and nearly 2,400 people in Operation Iraqi Freedom. It opened an important airfield in northern Iraq and provided critical en route support to deploying forces, not to mention vital logistical and medical support to forward-deployed forces. USAFE subsequently supported Operation New Dawn and Operation Inherent Resolve.

USAFE airmen are engaged in a wide range of active U.S. military efforts in Europe and Africa, including realistic U.S. and NATO exercises and operations in Afghanistan, Iraq, and Somalia.

The 414th Expeditionary Reconnaissance Squadron was activated at Incirlik Air Base in Turkey in October 2011.

On 20 April 2012, USAFAF was merged with USAFE to become United States Air Forces in Europe – Air Forces Africa (USAFE-AFAFRICA). The merger was a result of Seventeenth Air Force at Ramstein Air Base inactivating in April 2012 as part of an Air Force cost savings effort. USAFE assumed the former staff functions of 17th Air Force, while the 3d Air Force and its 603rd Air and Space Operations Center assumed responsibility for U.S. military air operations in Africa (except for Egypt), with the 603 AOC absorbing the former 617th Air Operations Center.

== Operating units, 2022 ==
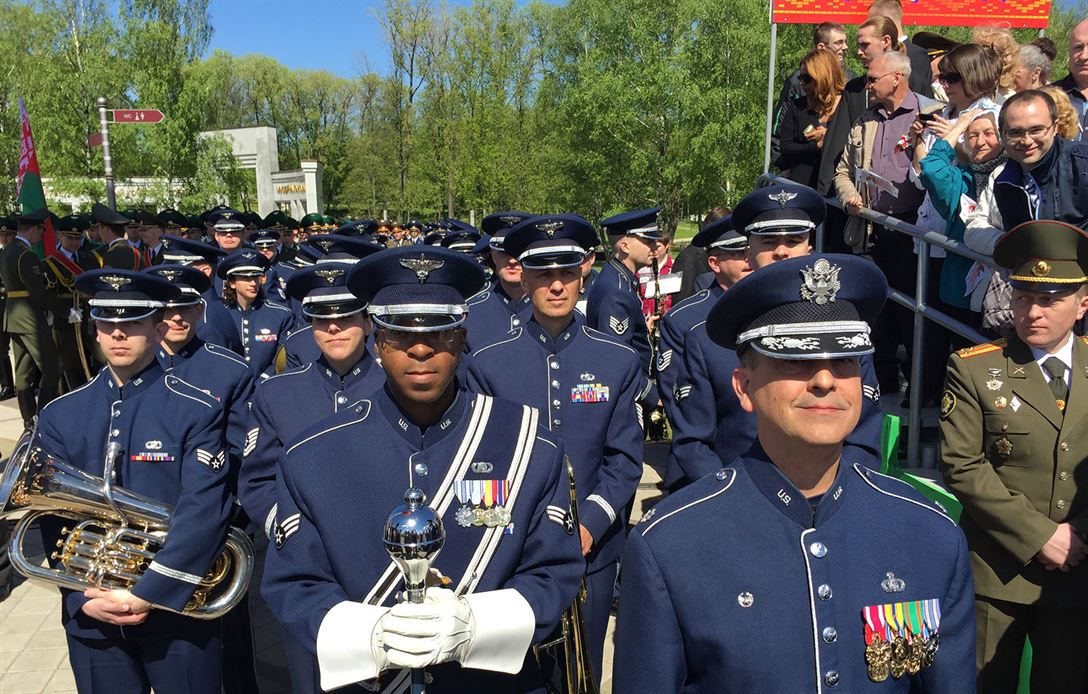
The USAFE Band.

Third Air Force (3 AF), headquartered at Ramstein Air Base, Germany, is USAFE-AFAFRICA's sole numbered air force, operating alongside Headquarters USAFE-AFAFRICA. Its mission is ensuring the combat readiness of assigned USAFE-AFAFRICA units, formulation of plans for combat operations and non-combat humanitarian operations in the USAFE and AFAFRICA areas of responsibility, and conducting day-to-day operations for both European and Africa Commands.

As of March 2022, the Third Air Force had ten wings totalling over 32,000 personnel. Some of the major units assigned to USAFE-AFAFRICA are:

United Kingdom

48th Fighter Wing (RAF Lakenheath)

492nd Fighter Squadron (F-15E Strike Eagle)
493rd Fighter Squadron (F-35A Lightning II)
494th Fighter Squadron (F-15E Strike Eagle)
495th Fighter Squadron (F-35A Lightning II)

100th Air Refueling Wing (RAF Mildenhall)

351st Air Refueling Squadron (KC-135R Stratotanker)

501st Combat Support Wing (RAF Alconbury)

422nd Air Base Group (RAF Croughton)

420th Air Base Squadron (RAF Fairford)

423rd Air Base Group (RAF Alconbury)

421st Air Base Squadron (RAF Menwith Hill)
426th Air Base Squadron (Sola Air Station, Norway)

Italy

31st Fighter Wing (Aviano Air Base)

56th Rescue Squadron (HH-60G Pave Hawk)
57th Rescue Squadron (Pararescuemen)
510th Fighter Squadron (F-16CM/DM (Block 40) Fighting Falcon)
555th Fighter Squadron (F-16CG/DG (Block 40) Fighting Falcon)

Turkey

39th Air Base Wing (Incirlik Air Base)

425th Air Base Squadron (Izmir Air Station)
717th Air Base Squadron (Ankara Air Station)

Germany

52nd Fighter Wing (Spangdahlem Air Base)

470th Air Base Squadron (NATO Air Base Geilenkirchen, Germany)
480th Fighter Squadron (F-16CJ/DJ (Block 50) Fighting Falcon)
701st Munitions Support Squadron (Kleine Brogel Air Base, Belgium)
702nd Munitions Support Squadron (Büchel Air Base)
703rd Munitions Support Squadron (Volkel Air Base, Netherlands)
704th Munitions Support Squadron (Ghedi Air Base, Italy)

86th Airlift Wing (Ramstein Air Base)

37th Airlift Squadron (C-130J Super Hercules)
76th Airlift Squadron (C-21A, C-37A Gulfstream V)
424th Air Base Squadron (Chièvres Air Base, Belgium)
65th Air Base Group (Lajes Field, Azores, Portugal)

496th Air Base Squadron (Morón Air Base, Spain)

406th Air Expeditionary Wing (Ramstein Air Base)

409th Air Expeditionary Group (Nigerien Air Base 201, Niger)

324th Expeditionary Reconnaissance Squadron (MQ-9 Reaper) (Naval Air Station Sigonella, Italy)
768th Expeditionary Air Base Squadron (Nigerien Air Base 101, Niger)

449th Air Expeditionary Group (Camp Lemonnier, Djibouti)

12th Expeditionary Special Operations Squadron (Chabelley Airfield, Djibouti)
75th Expeditionary Airlift Squadron (C-130J Super Hercules)
82nd Expeditionary Rescue Squadron (Pararescuemen)

435th Air Ground Operations Wing (Ramstein Air Base)
603rd Air and Space Operations Center (Ramstein Air Base)

Tenant Flying Units not part of USAFE-AFAFRICA:

95th Reconnaissance Squadron (RC-135V/W) (ACC) (RAF Mildenhall, United Kingdom)
352nd Special Operations Wing (AFSOC) (RAF Mildenhall, United Kingdom)

7th Special Operations Squadron (CV-22B Osprey)
67th Special Operations Squadron (MC-130J Commando II)

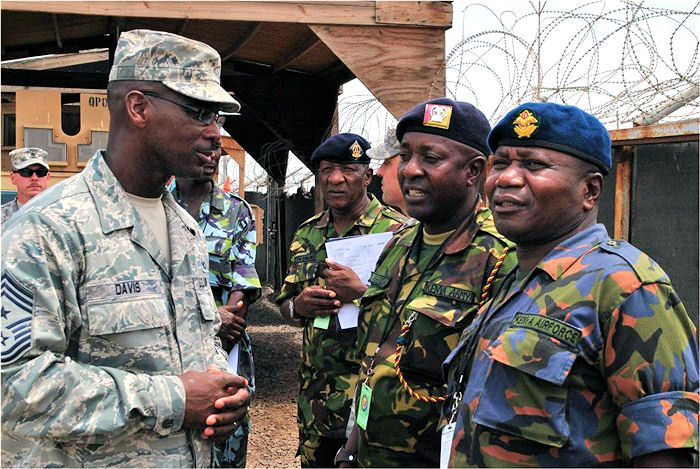
Combined Joint Task Force – Horn of Africa Command Senior Enlisted Leader, U.S. Air Force Chief Master Sgt. James E. Davis, Kenya Air Force Base Sgt. Major Maurice Atsango Matwang'a (right) and Kenya Army Weapons Training Sgt. Major David Karisa Barisa discuss a personnel inspection they just completed.

The United States Air Forces in Europe Band with its approximately 48 members is located on Ramstein Air Base, Germany. In addition to its own units, the command is routinely augmented by rotational aircraft and personnel from Air Combat Command (ACC), Air Mobility Command (AMC), Air Force Special Operations Command (AFSOC) and Air Force Global Strike Command (AFGSC) units in the United States, as well as Air Force Reserve Command (AFRC) and Air National Guard (ANG) units.

Air Forces Africa comprises two air expeditionary groups, both subordinate to the 435th Air Expeditionary Wing (435 AEW). The 449th Air Expeditionary Group (449 AEG) at Camp Lemonnier, Djibouti flies a multitude of missions for Combined Joint Task Force – Horn of Africa (CJTF-HOA). Among its subordinate units are the 75th Expeditionary Airlift Squadron (C-130) as well as pararescuemen from the 82nd Expeditionary Rescue Squadron which are rotated from rescue wings in the United States. The 60th Expeditionary Reconnaissance Squadron flew UAVs from Djibouti from after 2010 until it was inactivated in 2015.

The 409th Air Expeditionary Group (409 AEG) carries out surveillance and reconnaissance missions across the entire Africa Command area of responsibility, from multiple locations. It is equipped with unmanned aerial vehicles.

== Lineage, assignments, components ==
- Redesignated: from United States Strategic Air Forces in Europe to United States Air Forces in Europe on 7 August 1945

Was a specified command of the Joint Chiefs of Staff, 22 January 1951 – 1 July 1956

Redesignated: United States Air Forces in Europe – Air Forces Africa on 20 April 2012

=== Assignments ===
- European Theater of Operations United States Army, c. 18 June 1942
- European Command, 15 March 1947
- United States Air Force, 26 September 1947–present

=== Stations ===
- Saint-Germain-en-Laye, France, 26 September 1944
- Wiesbaden AB, Germany (Later West Germany), 28 September 1945 - 15 August 1953
- Lindsey AB (later, Lindsey AS), West Germany, 15 August 1953 - 14 March 1973
- Ramstein AB, West Germany, 14 March 1973 – present

=== Components ===
Commands

- IX Air Service Command (later European Air Materiel Command): c. 15 August 1945 – 10 November 1947
- IX Air Defense Command (1945–46)
- European Aviation Engineer (Provisional): 22 December 1945 – 20 November 1946
- Headquarters, Command, USAFE (Provisional): 12 October 1946 – 1 July 1948
- 8th Interceptor (later, 8th Fighter; VIII Fighter): 1 February 1942 – 22 February 1944; 16 July 1945 – 20 March 1946
- 8th Air Force Base Command (later, 8th Air Force Service Command; VIII Air Force Service Command; Air Service Command, USSTAF: Air Technical Service Command in Europe): c. 9 June 1942 – 30 September 1945
- XII Tactical Air: 15 November 1945 – 10 November 1947

Task Forces

- Airlift (Provisional): 29 July-4 November 1948
- 1st Airlift: 14 October 1948 – 1 October 1949
- VIII Air Force Base (later, Base): 18 October 1943 – 1 March 1944; 30 September 1945 – 25 May 1946

Air Forces

- Third Air Force (later redesignated Third Air Force (Air Forces Europe)): 1 May 1951 – 1 November 2005; 1 December 2006–present
- Ninth Air Force: June 1944 – 2 December 1945
- Twelfth Air Force

Attached 12 September-9 November 1942
Assigned 7–31 August 1945; 21 January 1951 – 1 January 1958

- Fifteenth Air Force: 22 February 1944 – 15 September 1945
- Sixteenth Air Force: 15 April 1966 – 30 April 2008
- Seventeenth Air Force: 23 April 1953 – 30 September 1996; 1 October 2008 – 20 April 2012

Air Divisions

- 2d Air Division: 1 June 1949 – 20 January 1951; 15 April 1955 – 1 April 1962
- 3d Air Division: 23 August 1948 – 2 January 1949; 21 January-1 May 1951; 25 October 1953 – 1 March 1954. 40: c. 31 October 1945 – 20 December 1946
- 42d Air Division: 26 July-13 October 1945
- 65th Air Division: 1 July 1960 – 1 January 1965
- 86th Air Division: 1 July 1948 – 10 October 1949; 1 January 1958 – 15 November 1959; 1 July-1 September 1963; 20 May 1965 – 5 October 1968.
- 302d Air Division: 18 July-c. 8 December 1945
- 306th Air Division: 15 November 1959 – 1 April 1960
- 322d Air Division: 1 March-1 April 1954
- 7217th Air Division: 15 November 1959 – 9 September 1970
- 7499th Air Division: 29 July-5 September 1948 (Berlin Airlift Force)

Services

- European Air Transport Service: 4 September 1945 – 20 December 1947

Groups

- 366th Fighter Group (only component of 71st Fighter Wing, IX Air Defense Command, which was active after redesignation to USAFE. IX ADC was assigned to USAFE 2 December 1945 – 1 February 1946). Assigned to XII TAC 4 July 1945 – 20 August 1946, whereupon inactivated at AAF Station Fritzlar, Germany, and aircraft, personnel and equipment formed 27th Fighter Group.
- others

== List of commanders ==
| No. | Commander | | Term | | |
| No. | Portrait | Name | Took office | Left office | Term length |
|---|---|---|---|---|---|
| 1 | John K. Cannon | Lieutenant General; John K. Cannon | 4 July 1945 | 14 August 1947 | 2 years, 41 days |
| - | John F. McBlain | Brigadier General; John F. McBlain; Acting | 14 August 1947 | 20 October 1947 | 67 days |
| 2 | Curtis E. LeMay | Lieutenant General; Curtis E. LeMay | 20 October 1947 | 16 October 1948 | 362 days |
| 1 | John K. Cannon | Lieutenant General; John K. Cannon | 16 October 1948 | 21 January 1951 | 2 years, 97 days |
| 3 | Lauris Norstad | General; Lauris Norstad | 21 January 1951 | 27 July 1953 | 2 years, 187 days |
| 4 | William H. Tunner | Lieutenant General; William H. Tunner | 27 July 1953 | 1 July 1957 | 3 years, 339 days |
| 5 | Frank F. Everest | General; Frank F. Everest | 1 July 1957 | 1 August 1959 | 2 years, 31 days |
| 6 | Frederic H. Smith Jr. | General; Frederic H. Smith Jr. | 1 August 1959 | 1 July 1961 | 1 year, 334 days |
| 7 | Truman H. Landon | General; Truman H. Landon | 1 July 1961 | 1 August 1963 | 2 years, 31 days |
| 8 | Gabriel P. Disosway | General; Gabriel P. Disosway | 1 August 1963 | 1 August 1965 | 2 years, 0 days |
| 9 | Bruce K. Holloway | General; Bruce K. Holloway | 1 August 1965 | 1 August 1966 | 1 year, 0 days |
| 10 | Maurice A. Preston | General; Maurice A. Preston | 1 August 1966 | 1 August 1968 | 2 years, 0 days |
| 11 | Horace M. Wade | General; Horace M. Wade | 1 August 1968 | 1 February 1969 | 184 days |
| 12 | Joseph R. Holzapple | General; Joseph R. Holzapple | 1 February 1969 | 1 September 1971 | 2 years, 212 days |
| 13 | David C. Jones | General; David C. Jones | 1 September 1971 | 1 July 1974 | 2 years, 303 days |
| 14 | John W. Vogt | General; John W. Vogt | 1 July 1974 | 1 September 1975 | 1 year, 62 days |
| 15 | Richard H. Ellis | General; Richard H. Ellis | 1 September 1975 | 1 August 1977 | 1 year, 334 days |
| 16 | William J. Evans | General; William J. Evans | 1 August 1977 | 1 August 1978 | 1 year, 0 days |
| 17 | John W. Pauly | General; John W. Pauly | 1 August 1978 | 1 August 1980 | 2 years, 0 days |
| 18 | Charles A. Gabriel | General; Charles A. Gabriel | 1 August 1980 | 1 July 1982 | 1 year, 334 days |
| 19 | Billy M. Minter | General; Billy M. Minter | 1 July 1982 | 1 November 1984 | 2 years, 123 days |
| 20 | Charles L. Donnelly Jr. | General; Charles L. Donnelly Jr. | 1 November 1984 | 1 May 1987 | 2 years, 181 days |
| 21 | William L. Kirk | General; William L. Kirk | 1 May 1987 | 12 April 1989 | 1 year, 346 days |
| 22 | Michael J. Dugan | General; Michael J. Dugan | 12 April 1989 | 26 June 1990 | 1 year, 75 days |
| 23 | Robert C. Oaks | General; Robert C. Oaks | 26 June 1990 | 29 July 1994 | 4 years, 33 days |
| 24 | James L. Jamerson | General; James L. Jamerson | 29 July 1994 | 17 July 1995 | 353 days |
| 25 | Richard E. Hawley | General; Richard E. Hawley | 17 July 1995 | 4 April 1996 | 262 days |
| 26 | Michael E. Ryan | General; Michael E. Ryan | 4 April 1996 | 6 October 1997 | 1 year, 185 days |
| - | William J. Begert | Lieutenant General; William J. Begert; Acting | 6 October 1997 | 5 December 1997 | 60 days |
| 27 | John P. Jumper | General; John P. Jumper | 5 December 1997 | 13 January 2000 | 2 years, 39 days |
| 28 | Gregory S. Martin | General; Gregory S. Martin | 13 January 2000 | 12 August 2003 | 3 years, 211 days |
| 29 | Robert H. Foglesong | General; Robert H. Foglesong | 12 August 2003 | 6 December 2005 | 2 years, 116 days |
| 30 | William T. Hobbins | General; William T. Hobbins | 6 December 2005 | 10 December 2007 | 2 years, 4 days |
| 31 | Robert D. Bishop Jr. | Lieutenant General; Robert D. Bishop Jr. | 10 December 2007 | 9 January 2008 | 30 days |
| 32 | Roger A. Brady | General; Roger A. Brady | 9 January 2008 | 13 December 2010 | 2 years, 338 days |
| 33 | Mark A. Welsh III | General; Mark A. Welsh III | 13 December 2010 | 31 July 2012 | 1 year, 231 days |
| 34 | Philip M. Breedlove | General; Philip M. Breedlove | 31 July 2012 | 10 May 2013 | 283 days |
| - | Noel T. Jones | Lieutenant General; Noel T. Jones; Acting | 10 May 2013 | 2 August 2013 | 84 days |
| 35 | Frank Gorenc | General; Frank Gorenc | 2 August 2013 | 11 August 2016 | 3 years, 9 days |
| 36 | Tod D. Wolters | General; Tod D. Wolters | 11 August 2016 | 1 May 2019 | 2 years, 263 days |
| 37 | Jeffrey L. Harrigian | General; Jeffrey L. Harrigian | 1 May 2019 | 27 June 2022 | 3 years, 57 days |
| 38 | James B. Hecker | General; James B. Hecker | 27 June 2022 | 3 May 2025 | 2 years, 310 days |
| - | Jason Hinds | Lieutenant General; Jason Hinds; Acting | 3 May 2025 | 30 October 2025 | 180 days |
| 39 | Jason Hinds | Lieutenant General; Jason Hinds | 30 October 2025 | Incumbent | 316 days |

== See also ==
- Outline of the U.S. Air Force in Europe at the end of the Cold War
- United States Air Force in France
- United States Air Force in the United Kingdom
- Strategic Air Command in the United Kingdom
- List of joint US-Bulgarian military bases
