= Balboa, Panama =

Balboa
- Locality
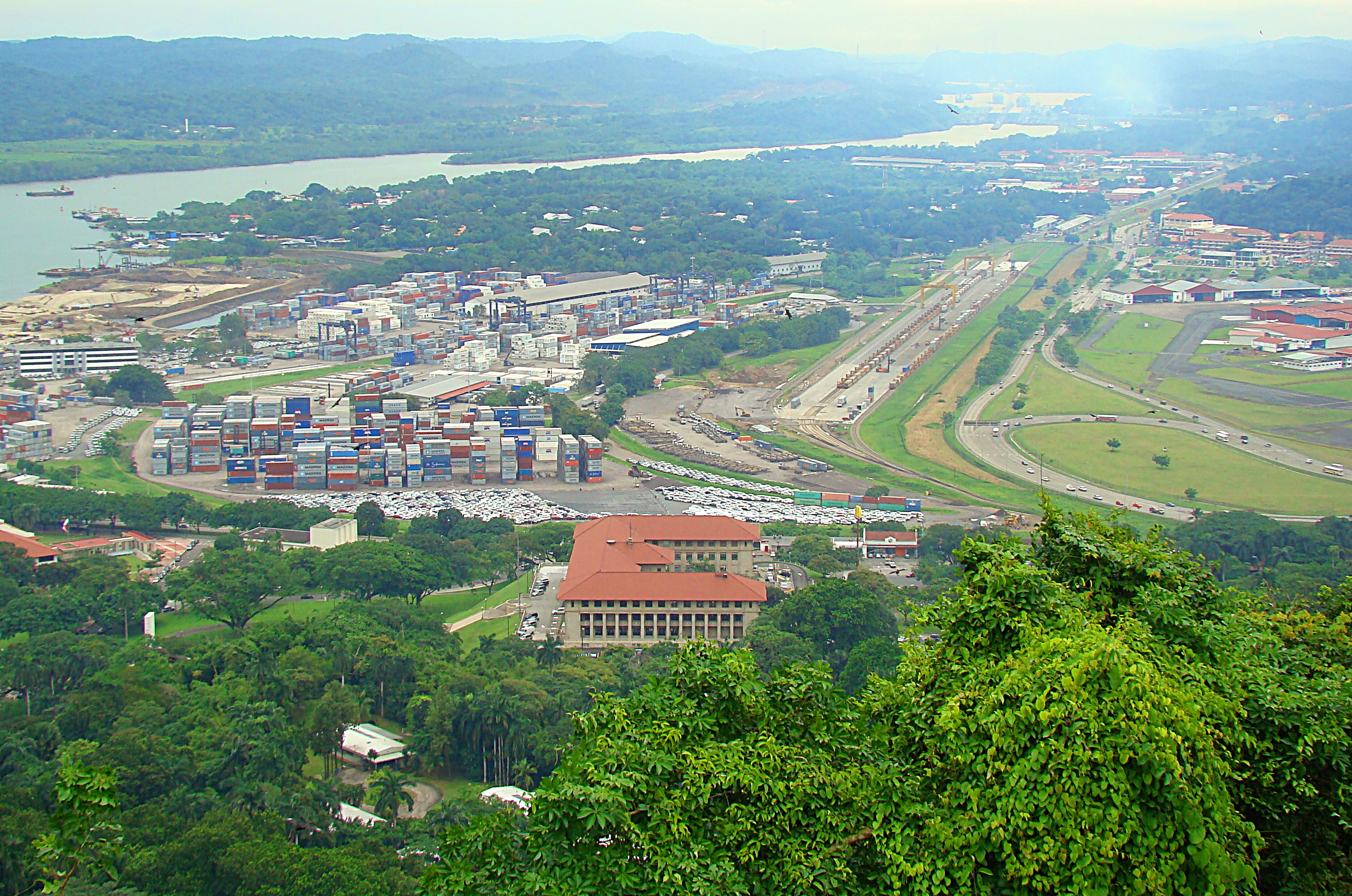
- View of the city showing the Panama Canal and the headquarters building

- Location within Panama
- Coordinates: 8°57′N 79°34′W
- Country: Panama
- Province: Panama
- District: Panama

Population
  - Total: ~10,000

Balboa is a district of Panama City, located at the Pacific entrance to the Panama Canal. It was the capital of the Panama Canal Zone under American administration. The Panama Canal Authority has its main headquarters (Edificio de La Administración del Canal de Panamá) on Balboa Heights.

== History ==
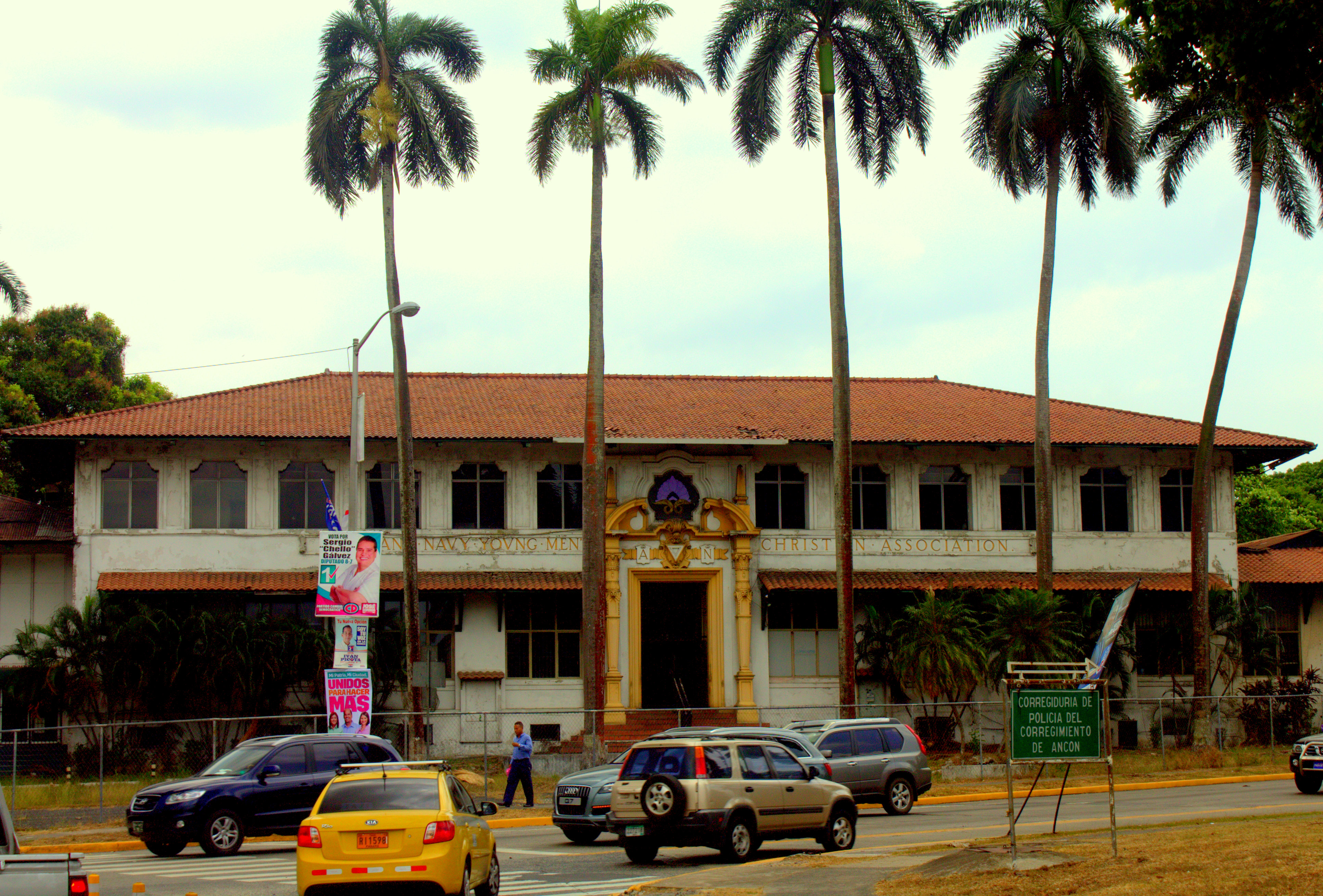
Former YMCA Building in 2014

The town of Balboa, founded by the United States during the construction of the Panama Canal, was named after Vasco Núñez de Balboa, the Spanish conquistador credited with discovering the Pacific Ocean. The name was suggested to the Panama Canal Zone authorities by the Peruvian ambassador to Panama. The hilly area north of Panama City was home to a few subsistence ranches and unused marshlands prior to being drained, filled, and leveled by the United States Army Corps of Engineers.

The town of Balboa, like most towns in the Canal Zone, was served by the Canal Zone Government–operated facilities. These include Canal Zone government-schools, post office, police and fire stations, commissary, cafeteria, movie theater, service center, bowling alley, other recreational facilities and company stores. There were several schools in the area, including Balboa Elementary School, Balboa High School, and the private St. Mary's School. The town was also home to two private banks, a credit union, a Jewish Welfare Board, several Christian denomination churches, civic clubs (such as the Elks Club and the Knights of Columbus), a Masonic Lodge, a YMCA, several historic monuments, and a miniature Statue of Liberty donated by the Boy Scouts of America.

=== Panama Canal Treaties ===
Until 1979, when the Canal Zone as a solely U.S. territory was abolished under the terms of the Panama Canal Treaties, the town of Balboa was the administrative center of the Canal Zone, and remained so until midday on December 31, 1999, when, according to the Torrijos-Carter Treaties, the Panama Canal and all its assets and territories were fully returned to the Panamanian government.

=== Panama Canal Administration Building ===
The Panama Canal Administration Building, the former seat of the Canal Zone Government and Panama Canal Company, is located in Balboa Heights and is used as the main administration building for the agency that runs the Panama Canal — previously the Panama Canal Commission, now the Panama Canal Authority. The building has large murals painted by William B. Van Ingen, depicting the construction of the canal.

=== Balboa Naval Communications Station ===
A United States Navy very-low-frequency naval communications station (callsign NBA) near Balboa began service around 1908. In 1913, a radio naval transmission station was built, allowing for transmissions to ships and eventually to transmit orders to submerged submarines.

== Port of Balboa ==
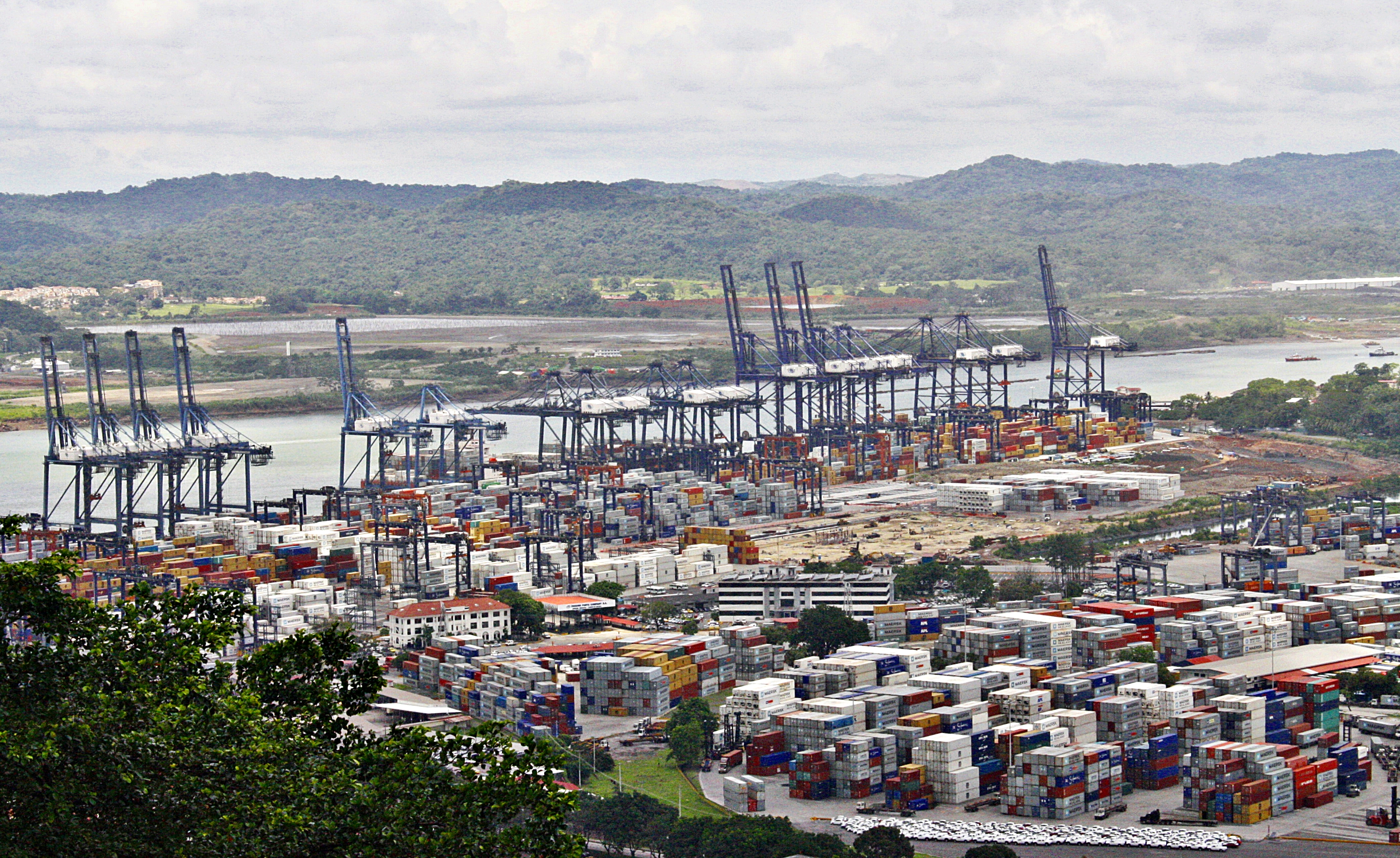
Port of Balboa

Balboa is located on the Pacific-side port of the Panama Canal and serves as an important transshipment container port. The port was inaugurated in 1909. Balboa has a dry dock in Panamax size (even the gates have a construction similar to that of the locks of the Panama canal). In 2012, Balboa was ranked the busiest container port in Latin America. In 2024, the container port was reported as having a 5 million TEU capacity.

Balboa has a multimodal (ship-to-train) terminal, the Pacific Terminal, connected to Colón by the Panama Canal Railway. This allows transportation of containers by train across the isthmus. The railway also runs a passenger service between Panama City and Colón, once a day, each way.

Balboa yacht club is an historic yacht club. In 2000, the yacht club had some 80 boat moorings.

== Climate ==
Climate data for Balboa, 9 m asl (1961–1990 normals)
Month	Jan	Feb	Mar	Apr	May	Jun	Jul	Aug	Sep	Oct	Nov	Dec	Year
Record high °C (°F)	34.4 (93.9)	35.0 (95.0)	35.6 (96.1)	36.1 (97.0)	36.1 (97.0)	34.4 (93.9)	35.0 (95.0)	35.0 (95.0)	34.4 (93.9)	33.9 (93.0)	35.0 (95.0)	34.4 (93.9)	36.1 (97.0)
Mean daily maximum °C (°F)	31.4 (88.5)	32.1 (89.8)	32.6 (90.7)	32.2 (90.0)	30.8 (87.4)	30.2 (86.4)	30.6 (87.1)	30.1 (86.2)	29.8 (85.6)	29.4 (84.9)	29.4 (84.9)	30.3 (86.5)	30.7 (87.3)
Daily mean °C (°F)	27.5 (81.5)	27.8 (82.0)	28.3 (82.9)	28.2 (82.8)	27.6 (81.7)	27.2 (81.0)	27.4 (81.3)	27.2 (81.0)	26.8 (80.2)	26.5 (79.7)	26.5 (79.7)	26.8 (80.2)	27.3 (81.2)
Mean daily minimum °C (°F)	23.5 (74.3)	23.4 (74.1)	23.9 (75.0)	24.1 (75.4)	24.4 (75.9)	24.1 (75.4)	24.2 (75.6)	24.2 (75.6)	23.8 (74.8)	23.5 (74.3)	23.6 (74.5)	23.3 (73.9)	23.8 (74.9)
Record low °C (°F)	18.3 (64.9)	19.4 (66.9)	18.9 (66.0)	20.0 (68.0)	21.1 (70.0)	21.1 (70.0)	21.1 (70.0)	21.1 (70.0)	21.1 (70.0)	21.1 (70.0)	20.6 (69.1)	19.4 (66.9)	18.3 (64.9)
Average precipitation mm (inches)	23.8 (0.94)	25.5 (1.00)	1.5 (0.06)	98.6 (3.88)	241.4 (9.50)	221.4 (8.72)	195.9 (7.71)	199.2 (7.84)	203.4 (8.01)	268.1 (10.56)	300.1 (11.81)	132.3 (5.21)	1,911.2 (75.24)
Average precipitation days (≥ 1 mm)	3.29	2.58	0.29	7.00	14.43	15.57	16.29	14.71	15.29	17.57	19.57	11.86	138.45
Source 1: Météo climat stats
Source 2: Météo Climat

== Education ==
The International Maritime University of Panama has a waterside campus in Balboa.

== See also ==
- Naval Base Panama Canal Zone
