= United States Air Force in France =

US Air Force units stationed in France from 1951–1966

Former bases of the United States Air Force in France
- Part of the Cold War
- Map of former NATO air bases in France.
Date	1951–1966
Location	France
Result	US Withdrawal in accordance with French withdrawal From NATO Military Command Structure

From 1951 to 1966 the United States Air Force deployed thousands of personnel and hundreds of combat aircraft to France to counter the buildup of the Soviet Armed Forces in Central and Eastern Europe. The Cold War escalated into the attempted seizure of West Berlin during 1948. This convinced the western nations to form a common defense organization. Discussions led to the North Atlantic Treaty Organization. NATO's defense strategy came to incorporate land, sea, and air forces.

Due to the vulnerability of West Germany to Soviet attack, USAF planners did not want any new tactical air units moved into the U.S. Zone of Occupation there. By 1950, the United States Air Forces in Europe (USAFE) wanted all tactical air units to be located west of the Rhine River to provide greater air defense warning time. France agreed to provide air base sites.

Between 1950 and 1967 the United States Air Force operated 11 major air bases in France. There were other communications sites, NATO Dispersed Operating Bases, Sub-Depots and minor facilities at several French Airports, such as Orly Airport and Marseille Provence Airport. The United States Army also established a significant presence in France, and was responsible for much air base construction and maintenance.

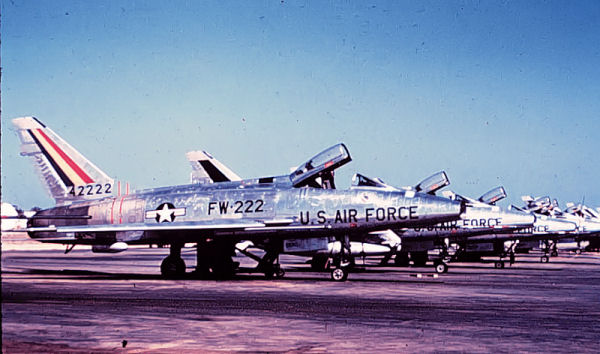
F-100D fighter-bombers of the 48th Tactical Fighter Wing at Chaumont-Semoutiers Air Base, 1957.

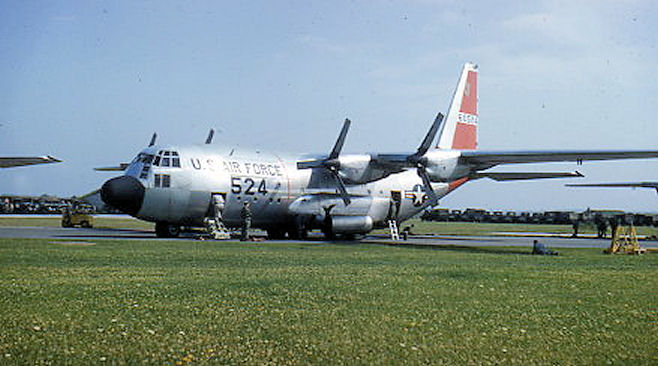
C-130A 56-0524 of the 40th Troop Carrier Squadron, Evreux-Fauville Air Base, 1958 provided USAFE Tactical Airlift capabilities

France was a founding member of NATO which came into existence on 24 August 1949. The first non French NATO tenant in France was the 1630th Air Base Squadron of the USAF Military Air Transport Service, activated in June 1950 at Paris - Orly Air Base. On 28 February 1958 the official name of Orly Air Base was changed to Orly Airport and most MATS flights were routed to Chateauroux Air Depot.

== US Withdrawal ==
After 15 years of U.S. Air Force presence, French President Charles de Gaulle decided to evict non-French NATO forces from France, having developed its own nuclear weapons. He refused to store U.S. nuclear weapons on French soil. On 7 March 1966, he announced that France would withdraw from the NATO Military Command Structure. He gave foreign NATO forces one year to depart France.

The State Department, the United States Department of Defense, and Air Force carefully managed the news about the American departure from France, and the attendant problems of an integrated NATO air defense for western Europe and the decrease in tactical airpower. Due to the U.S. media focus on the Vietnam War, the removal of foreign, mainly US, NATO forces from France went virtually unreported in the US.

During 1966–67 all USAF offices and facilities in France were closed and personnel and equipment moved. The last USAF activities were the 1630th Air Base Squadron at Orly Airport and the Paris Administration Office. Both were closed in June 1967.

On 23 October 1967, all foreign flags were furled and after 17 years the last foreign NATO forces departed France.

Today most of the old USAF air bases in France are being used by the French military and are not accessible to tourists.
