= Balboa Heights, Panama =

Human settlement in Panama

Coordinates: 8°57′N 79°33′W

Balboa Heights (Spanish: Altos de Balboa) was more or less part of the Panama Canal township of Balboa, existing on its edge, towards Ancón, and partly on the lower slopes of Ancon Hill. It was not really a proper township in terms of having anything beyond residential neighborhoods, but had its own map page in the Canal Zone telephone book. The 1914 Panama Canal Administration Building opened on Balboa Heights which overlooks the port. The Administration Building has extensive Canal art displays.
