= Truman H. Landon =

United States Air Force general

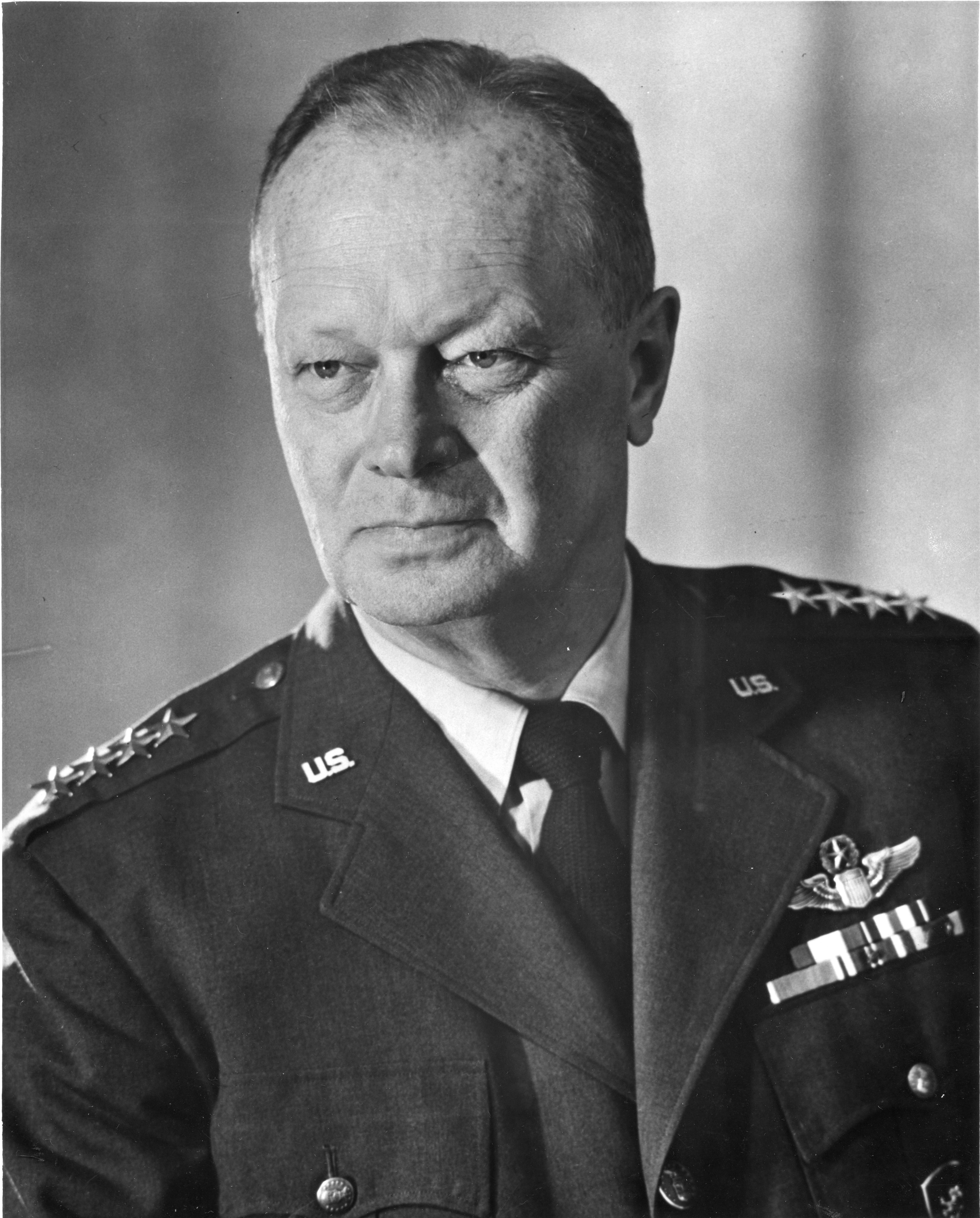
- General Truman H. Landon
- Born: Truman Hempel Landon; February 11, 1905; Maryville, Missouri, U.S.
- Died: January 27, 1986 (aged 80); San Antonio, Texas, U.S.
- Burial place: USAFA Cemetery
- Military career
- Allegiance: United States of America
- Branch: United States Air Force
- Service years: 1928–1963
- Rank: General
- Commands: U.S. Air Forces in Europe; Caribbean Air Command
- Conflicts: World War II
- Awards: Air Force Distinguished Service Medal; Silver Star; Legion of Merit; Distinguished Flying Cross (2); Air Medal (3)

General Truman Hempel "Ted" Landon (February 11, 1905 – January 27, 1986) was a U.S. Air Force general and commander, U.S. Air Forces in Europe.

== Biography ==
At West Point in 1928

Landon was born in Maryville, Missouri, and grew up in Carlinville, Illinois. After graduation from the Carlinville High School in 1922, he attended Blackburn College in that city and, in 1924, entered the United States Military Academy at West Point, New York.

He graduated from the academy in 1928 and received his pilot and observer ratings at Kelly Field, Texas, February 15, 1930. General Landon was a command pilot with more than 7,800 hours.

Following two years with the 3rd Attack Group at Fort Crockett, Texas, he served as a flying instructor from 1932 to 1936 at Randolph Field and with the Sixth Bomb Group at France Field in the Panama Canal Zone from 1937 to 1939. Returning to the United States, he attended the Air Corps Tactical School in 1939.

The commander of the 38th Reconnaissance Squadron from 1939 to 1942, General Landon participated in the first mass flight of B-17s from Hamilton Field, California, to Hickam Field, Hawaii, May 13, 1941.

On December 7, 1941, while en route to the Philippine Islands in command of the 38th Squadron, General Landon arrived at Hickam Field, Hawaii, during the Japanese attack. For his actions that day he received the Silver Star. In the film Tora! Tora! Tora!, about the attack on Pearl Harbor, Landon was portrayed by actor Norman Alden.

During World War II he commanded the Seventh Bomber Command in the Central Pacific. While commanding general of the Seventh Bomber Command he also commanded a Joint Task Group under Admiral Nimitz.

With the exception of a tour of duty with the Caribbean Air Command, General Landon post-war assignments were divided between Washington, D.C., and Germany. He graduated from the Army and Navy Staff College in 1945. Landon served in the NSC 68 study group in 1949. From March 1951 until August 1953 he served as deputy commander-in-chief and chief of staff for USAFE at Wiesbaden, Germany. In June 1956, he assumed command of the Caribbean Air Command, Albrook Air Force Base, Canal Zone, where he remained until August 1959.

His Washington duties were varied. He was the senior air instructor and later commandant of the Army and Navy Staff College. Other assignments included assistant deputy chief of staff for operations, inspector general and deputy chief of staff for personnel, all with Headquarters U.S. Air Force.

He assumed command of the 4th Allied Tactical Air Forces and U.S. Air Forces in Europe on July 1, 1961, succeeding General Frederic H. Smith Jr., who was named vice chief of staff, Headquarters U.S. Air Force. He retired from the Air Force on July 1, 1963, and died in San Antonio, Texas on January 27, 1986. Landon was interred at the United States Air Force Academy Cemetery on January 30, 1986.

In addition to his Air Force duties, Landon received a Doctor of Laws from Long Island University on January 29, 1960. He was also fluent in German and Spanish, frequently making public speeches in those languages.

Landon is the Great Uncle of actor and jet pilot Landon Ashworth.

== Decorations and awards ==
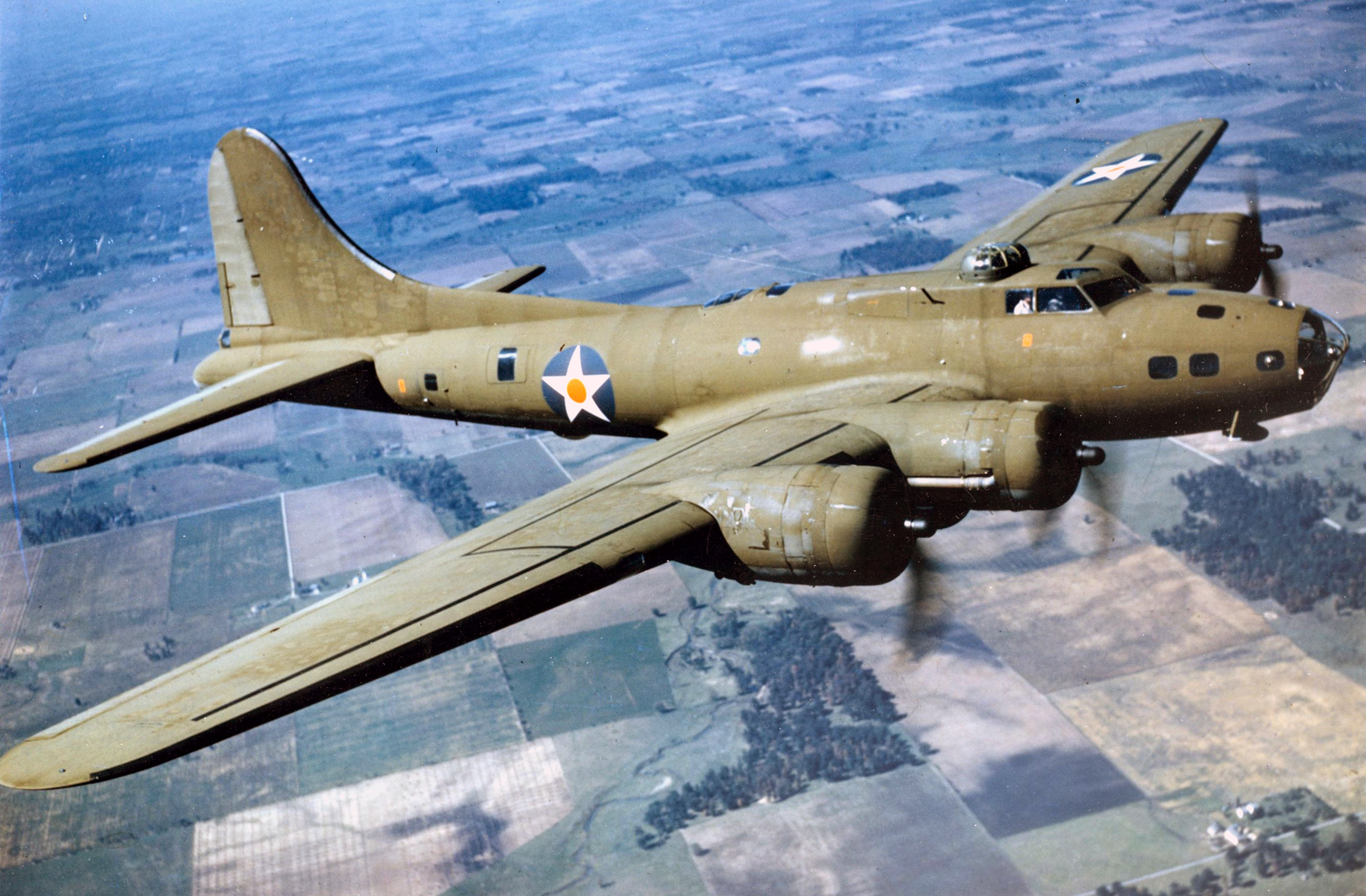
A Boeing B-17E Flying Fortress similar to the one flown by Landon during the Pearl Harbor attack

- Air Force Distinguished Service Medal
- Silver Star
- Legion of Merit
- Distinguished Flying Cross with oak leaf cluster
- Air Medal with two oak leaf clusters
- Army of Occupation Medal
- American Defense Service Medal
- American Campaign Medal
- Asiatic Pacific Campaign Medal
- World War II Victory Medal
- National Defense Service Medal

=== Silver Star citation ===
Major

LANDON, TRUMAN H.
U.S. Army Air Force

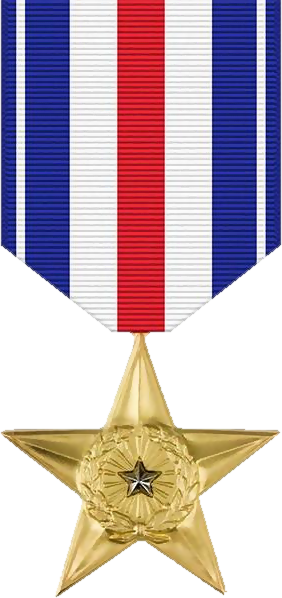
Silver Star

The Silver Star is presented to Truman H. Landon, Major, U.S. Army Air Force, for gallantry in action, conspicuous bravery, coolness and expert handling of his airplane while serving with the 18th Reconnaissance Squadron (Heavy), during the Japanese aerial attack on Hickam Field, Territory of Hawaii, on 7 December 1941. Major Landon, Echelon Commander on a flight from Hamilton Field, California, after an all-night flight and with only a small quantity of gasoline remaining which necessitated an early landing, arrived in the vicinity of Hickam Field during the Japanese attack and was subjected to heavy anti-aircraft fire and was attacked by Japanese aircraft. Major Landon's flight was unarmed and unprepared for an attack and rather than risk damaging the aircraft under his control by landing in an inadequate, although protected field, brought about the safe landing of his flight through his skill, coolness and daring under fire.

== See also ==
- List of commanders of USAFE
