= List of international goals scored by Sándor Kocsis =

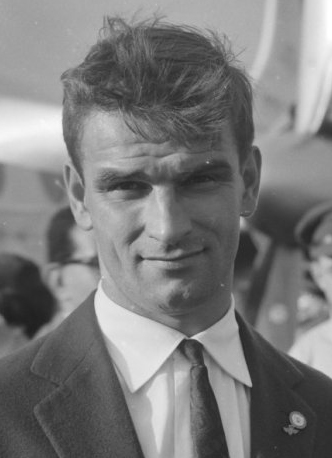
Kocsis in August 1960

Sándor Kocsis was a footballer who represented the Hungary national football team as a striker between 1948 and 1956. He scored his first international goal on 6 June 1948, during a 1948 Balkan Cup match against Romania. Since then, he has become his country's second top scorer in international football, and the fourth overall men's international goalscorer in Europe, having scored 75 goals in 68 appearances for Hungary. Only Portugal's Cristiano Ronaldo (146), Belgium's Romelu Lukaku (94), Poland's Robert Lewandowski (92), England's Harry Kane (91) and his fellow countryman Ferenc Puskás (84), have netted more international goals for a European nation than him. When he retired, he was the world's second all-time top goal scorer, only behind teammate Puskás.

On 20 November 1949, Kocsis scored his first international hat-trick against Sweden during a Friendly match. He has scored a national record of seven international hat-tricks, and on one occasion, four international goals in a single match, on 20 June 1954, during a 1954 World Cup match against the eventual champions, West Germany.

== International goals ==
Hungary score listed first, score column indicates score after each Kocsis goal.

List of international goals scored by Sándor Kocsis
No.	Cap	Date	Venue	Opponent	Score	Result	Competition	Ref
1	1	6 June 1948	Hungária, Budapest	Romania	6–0	9–0	1948 Balkan Cup	
2	1	6 June 1948	Hungária, Budapest	Romania	9–0	9–0	1948 Balkan Cup	
3	2	2 May 1949	Hungária, Budapest	Austria	2–0	6–1	1948–53 Dr. Gerö Cup	
4	4	19 June 1949	Råsunda Stadium, Stockholm	Sweden	2–0	2–2	Friendly	
5	7	20 November 1949	Hungária, Budapest	Sweden	1–0	5–0	Friendly	
6	7	20 November 1949	Hungária, Budapest	Sweden	3–0	5–0	Friendly	
7	7	20 November 1949	Hungária, Budapest	Sweden	4–0	5–0	Friendly	
8	8	30 April 1950	Hungária, Budapest	Czechoslovakia	2–0	5–0	Friendly	
9	8	30 April 1950	Hungária, Budapest	Czechoslovakia	4–0	5–0	Friendly	
10	9	15 May 1950	Praterstadion, Vienna	Austria	1–1	3–5	Friendly	
11	11	24 September 1950	Hungária, Budapest	Albania	5–0	12–0	Friendly	
12	11	24 September 1950	Hungária, Budapest	Albania	8–0	12–0	Friendly	
13	14	27 May 1951	Hungária, Budapest	Poland	1–0	6–0	Friendly	
14	14	27 May 1951	Hungária, Budapest	Poland	3–0	6–0	Friendly	
15	15	14 October 1951	Městský stadion, Ostrava	Czechoslovakia	1–0	2–1	Friendly	
16	15	14 October 1951	Městský stadion, Ostrava	Czechoslovakia	2–1	2–1	Friendly	
17	16	18 November 1951	Hungária, Budapest	Finland	2–0	8–0	Friendly	
18	16	18 November 1951	Hungária, Budapest	Finland	4–0	8–0	Friendly	
19	17	18 May 1952	Hungária, Budapest	East Germany	3–0	5–0	Friendly	
20	20	15 June 1952	Stadion Wojska Polskiego, Warsaw	Poland	1–0	5–1	Friendly	
21	20	15 June 1952	Stadion Wojska Polskiego, Warsaw	Poland	5–0	5–1	Friendly	
22	21	22 June 1952	Helsinki Olympic Stadium, Helsinki	Finland	3–0	6–1	Friendly	
23	21	22 June 1952	Helsinki Olympic Stadium, Helsinki	Finland	5–1	6–1	Friendly	
24	21	22 June 1952	Helsinki Olympic Stadium, Helsinki	Finland	6–1	6–1	Friendly	
25	22	15 July 1952	Kupittaa, Turku	Romania	2–0	2–1	1952 Summer Olympics preliminary round	
26	23	21 July 1952	Pallokenttä, Helsinki	Italy	3–0	3–0	1952 Summer Olympics first round	
27	24	24 July 1952	Urheilukeskus, Kotka	Turkey	2–0	7–1	1952 Summer Olympics quarter finals	
28	24	24 July 1952	Urheilukeskus, Kotka	Turkey	5–1	7–1	1952 Summer Olympics quarter finals	
29	25	28 July 1952	Helsinki Olympic Stadium, Helsinki	Sweden	4–0	6–0	1952 Summer Olympics semi finals	
30	25	28 July 1952	Helsinki Olympic Stadium, Helsinki	Sweden	6–0	6–0	1952 Summer Olympics semi finals	
31	27	20 September 1952	Wankdorf Stadium, Bern	Switzerland	3–2	4–2	1948–53 Dr. Gerö Cup	
32	28	19 October 1952	Megyeri úti Stadion, Budapest	Czechoslovakia	3–0	5–0	Friendly	
33	28	19 October 1952	Megyeri úti Stadion, Budapest	Czechoslovakia	4–0	5–0	Friendly	
34	28	19 October 1952	Megyeri úti Stadion, Budapest	Czechoslovakia	5–0	5–0	Friendly	
35	31	5 July 1953	Råsunda Stadium, Stockholm	Sweden	3–2	4–2	Friendly	
36	36	23 May 1954	Népstadion, Budapest	England	3–0	7–1	Hungary v England (1954)	
37	36	23 May 1954	Népstadion, Budapest	England	4–0	7–1	Hungary v England (1954)	
38	37	17 June 1954	Hardturm Stadium, Zürich	South Korea	3–0	9–0	1954 FIFA World Cup group stage	
39	37	17 June 1954	Hardturm Stadium, Zürich	South Korea	4–0	9–0	1954 FIFA World Cup group stage	
40	37	17 June 1954	Hardturm Stadium, Zürich	South Korea	5–0	9–0	1954 FIFA World Cup group stage	
41	38	20 June 1954	St. Jakob Stadium, Basel	West Germany	1–0	8–3	1954 FIFA World Cup group stage	
42	38	20 June 1954	St. Jakob Stadium, Basel	West Germany	3–0	8–3	1954 FIFA World Cup group stage	
43	38	20 June 1954	St. Jakob Stadium, Basel	West Germany	6–1	8–3	1954 FIFA World Cup group stage	
44	38	20 June 1954	St. Jakob Stadium, Basel	West Germany	8–2	8–3	1954 FIFA World Cup group stage	
45	39	27 June 1954	Wankdorf Stadium, Bern	Brazil	2–0	4–2	1954 FIFA World Cup Quarterfinal	
46	39	27 June 1954	Wankdorf Stadium, Bern	Brazil	4–2	4–2	1954 FIFA World Cup Quarterfinal	
47	40	30 June 1954	Stade Olympique de la Pontaise, Lausanne	Uruguay	3–2	4–2	1954 FIFA World Cup Semi Final	
48	40	30 June 1954	Stade Olympique de la Pontaise, Lausanne	Uruguay	4–2	4–2	1954 FIFA World Cup Semi Final	
49	42	19 September 1954	Népstadion, Budapest	Romania	1–0	5–1	Friendly	
50	42	19 September 1954	Népstadion, Budapest	Romania	2–1	5–1	Friendly	
51	43	26 September 1954	Dynamo Stadium, Moscow	Soviet Union	1–1	1–1	Friendly	
52	44	10 October 1954	Népstadion, Budapest	Switzerland	1–0	3–0	Friendly	
53	44	10 October 1954	Népstadion, Budapest	Switzerland	2–0	3–0	Friendly	
54	45	24 October 1954	Népstadion, Budapest	Czechoslovakia	1–0	4–1	Friendly	
55	45	24 October 1954	Népstadion, Budapest	Czechoslovakia	3–0	4–1	Friendly	
56	45	24 October 1954	Népstadion, Budapest	Czechoslovakia	4–0	4–1	Friendly	
57	46	14 November 1954	Népstadion, Budapest	Austria	3–1	4–1	Friendly	
58	47	8 December 1954	Hampden Park, Glasgow	Scotland	4–2	4–2	Friendly	
59	49	8 May 1955	Ullevaal Stadion, Oslo	Norway	1–0	5–0	Friendly	
60	50	11 May 1955	Råsunda Stadium, Stockholm	Sweden	1–0	7–3	Friendly	
61	50	11 May 1955	Råsunda Stadium, Stockholm	Sweden	4–0	7–3	Friendly	
62	50	11 May 1955	Råsunda Stadium, Stockholm	Sweden	7–3	7–3	Friendly	
63	51	15 May 1955	Idrætsparken, Copenhagen	Denmark	1–0	6–0	Friendly	
64	51	15 May 1955	Idrætsparken, Copenhagen	Denmark	4–0	6–0	Friendly	
65	53	29 May 1955	Népstadion, Budapest	Scotland	2–1	3–1	Friendly	
66	54	17 September 1955	Stade Olympique de la Pontaise, Lausanne	Switzerland	3–1	5–4	1955–60 Dr. Gerö Cup	
67	56	2 October 1955	Great Strahov Stadium, Prague	Czechoslovakia	1–0	3–1	1955–60 Dr. Gerö Cup	
68	57	16 October 1955	Népstadion, Budapest	Austria	2–1	6–1	1955–60 Dr. Gerö Cup	
69	62	3 June 1956	Stade du Heysel, Brussels	Belgium	2–1	4–5	Friendly	
70	62	3 June 1956	Stade du Heysel, Brussels	Belgium	3–1	4–5	Friendly	
71	63	9 June 1956	Estádio Nacional, Lisbon	Portugal	1–1	2–2	Friendly	
72	64	15 July 1956	Népstadion, Budapest	Poland	1–1	4–1	Friendly	
73	64	15 July 1956	Népstadion, Budapest	Poland	2–1	4–1	Friendly	
74	65	16 September 1956	Stadion FK Crvena Zvezda, Belgrade	Yugoslavia	2–1	3–1	1955–60 Dr. Gerö Cup	
75	67	7 October 1956	Parc des Princes, Paris	France	2–1	2–1	Friendly	

(* Non-FIFA match)

== Hat-tricks ==
No.	Date	Venue	Opponent	Goals	Result	Competition	Ref.
1	20 November 1949	Hungária, Budapest, Hungary	Sweden	3 – (9', 49', 56')	5–0	Friendly	
2	22 June 1952	Helsinki Olympic Stadium, Helsinki, Finland	Finland	3 – (49', 80', 84')	6–1	Friendly	
3	19 October 1952	Megyeri úti Stadion, Hungary	Czechoslovakia	3 – (27', 37', 78')	5–0	Friendly	
4	17 June 1954	Hardturm Stadium, Zürich, Switzerland	South Korea	3 – (24', 36', 50')	9–0	1954 FIFA World Cup group stage	
5	20 June 1954	St. Jakob Stadium, Basel, Switzerland	West Germany	4 – (3', 21', 68', 77')	8–3	1954 FIFA World Cup group stage	
6	24 October 1954	Népstadion, Budapest, Hungary	Czechoslovakia	3 – (11', 60', 74')	4–1	Friendly	
7	11 May 1955	Råsunda Stadium, Stockholm, Sweden	Sweden	3 – (16', 29', 81')	7–3	Friendly	

== Statistics ==
Hungary national team
Year	Apps	Goals
1948	1	2
1949	6	5
1950	6	5
1951	3	6
1952	12	16
1953	5	1
1954	14	23
1955	12	10
1956	9	7
Total	68	75

Goals by competition
Competition	Goals
Friendlies	50
Balkan Cup	2
Dr. Gerö Cup	6
1952 Summer Olympics	6
FIFA World Cup	11
Total	75

== See also ==
- List of men's footballers with 50 or more international goals
