= List of men's footballers with 50 or more international goals =

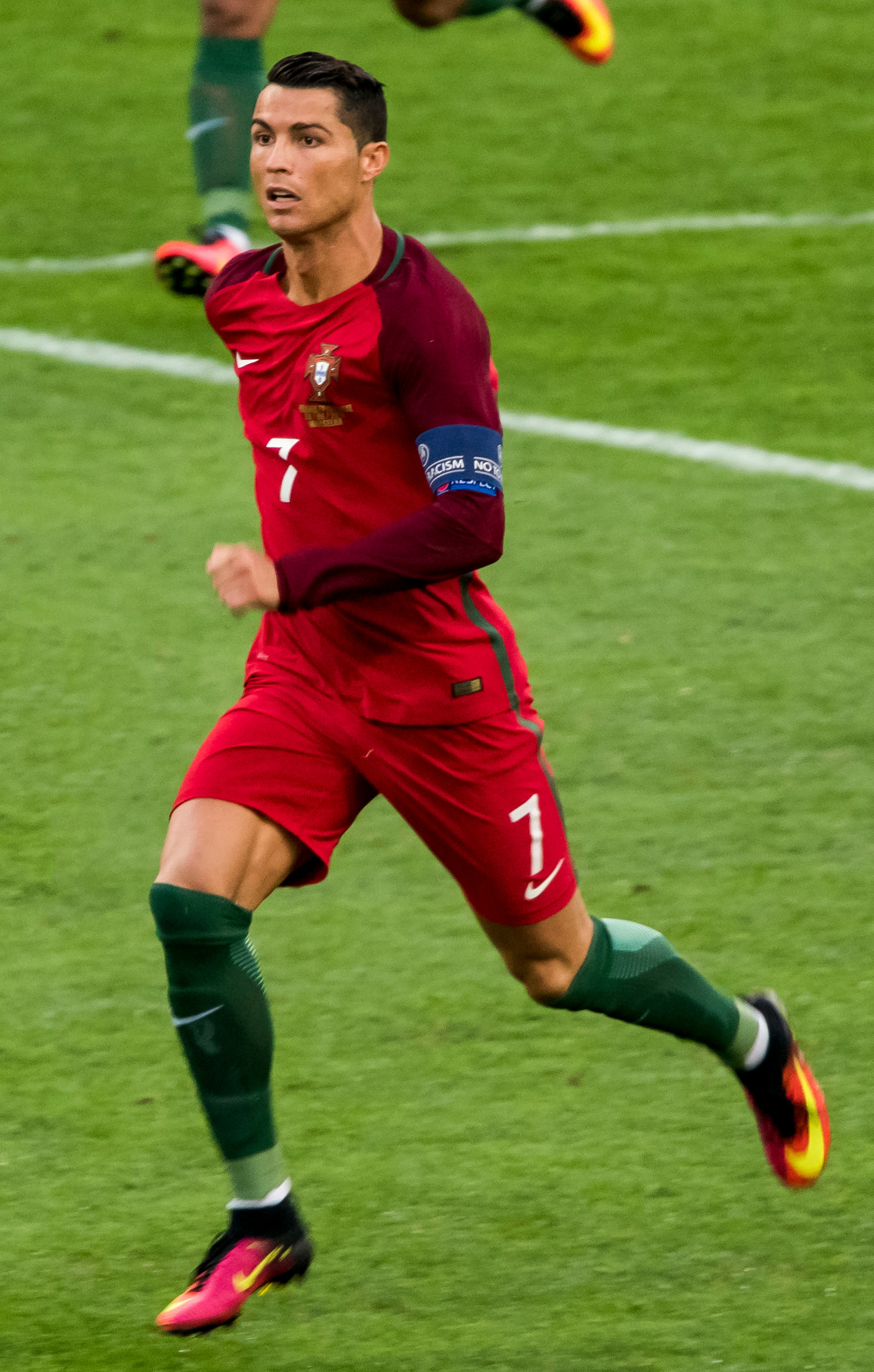
Cristiano Ronaldo holds the all-time men's international scoring record with 146 goals.

In total, 87 male footballers to date have scored at least 50 goals with their national team at senior level, according to FIFA documents, RSSSF and IFFHS statistics. Since October 2021, the International Olympic Committee (IOC) has also been publishing a list, but only of the top 10. Cristiano Ronaldo of Portugal holds the all-time record with 146 international goals.

Brazil, Hungary, Iran and Kuwait hold the record of having the most players to have scored 50 or more international goals with four each. England, France, Iraq, Japan, Malaysia, South Korea and Thailand each have three players who have achieved the feat. The Asian Football Confederation (AFC) has the highest number of footballers who scored at least 50 international goals, with 35 players. Egypt is the only African team with more than one player who has scored at least 50 international goals, after Mohamed Salah achieved the feat on 24 March 2023.

Bader Al-Mutawa of Kuwait has played the most matches so far to score 50 international goals. He scored his 50th goal during his 155th international appearance, in a hat-trick against Myanmar on 3 September 2015, in a 2018 FIFA World Cup qualification match.

== History ==
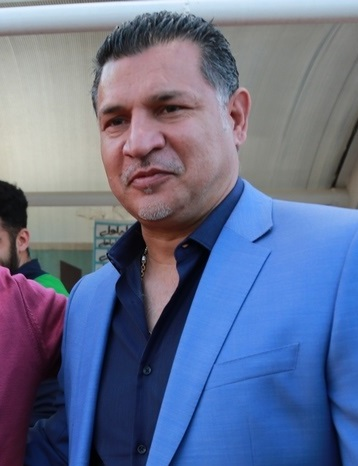
Ali Daei was the first player to reach 100 international goals.

In the early years of international football, what matches did and didn't count as full internationals was not always established or agreed, and records involving pre-World War One football in particular involve retrospective decisions as to which matches to include. While the first player to score 50 goals in what are now recognised as internationals was Imre Schlosser of Hungary in 1917, note should be taken too of Vivian Woodward who scored 75 goals in his 59-game international career, getting to 50 goals in 1909. However, many were in matches for England Amateurs which are now not listed as international games, despite having at the time been played against opponents' full-strength national teams. Schlosser would, eventually, reach 59 international goals in 68 matches, playing his last match on 10 April 1927. (Note: Austrian sources reported that on 1 November 1908 Imre Schlosser scored a brace in a 5–3 victory against Austria; one Hungarian source credits the 4–2 to Béla Krempels, with UEFA also recognizing 59 goals in 68 appearances.)

Ferenc Puskás was the first player to surpass both Schlosser and Woodward, going past Schlosser in 1953 and finishing his career with 84 goals in his international career. He remained the highest international goalscorer for 24 years, until Mokhtar Dahari of Malaysia broke the record in the Merdeka Tournament after scoring his 85th goal on 27 October 1980 against Kuwait; he went on to score 89 goals for his country in 142 international appearances. (Note: Mokhtar Dahari's goal tally was not revealed until March 2021.) In 2004, Ali Daei of Iran broke the record after scoring his 90th goal against Lebanon.

Daei also became the first player to score over 100 goals in international football, ending his career with 108 in total. (Note: Ali Daei was originally credited with 109 goals in 149 appearances, but FIFA later downgraded a match between Iran and the Ecuador Olympic team on 12 January 2000 as unofficial, meaning that his tally is now recognised as 108 goals in 148 matches.) His 100th goal came on 17 November 2004, when he scored a four-goal haul against Laos in a 2006 FIFA World Cup qualification match. Cristiano Ronaldo of Portugal was the second player to score 100 international goals, as well as the first European to achieve the feat. He reached the milestone after scoring a brace against Sweden in the 2020–21 UEFA Nations League on 8 September 2020. He would go on to break Daei's record in July 2021, scoring two goals to reach 111 in a game against Ireland.

The first player from outside Europe to reach 50 goals was Malaya's Abdul Ghani Minhat. He achieved the feat on 15 December 1961 against Thailand and he went on to score 58 goals in 57 international appearances for his country which is 1.02 per match. Pelé of Brazil was the first player from South America to score at least 50 international goals. He attained this in a friendly match against the Soviet Union on 21 November 1965, and went on to score 77 international goals in 92 matches. Lionel Messi of Argentina is the only South American to get beyond 100, haivng reached and passed the milestone in a friendly match against Curaçao on 28 March 2023. Malawi's Kinnah Phiri was the first player from Africa to score 50 international goals. Whilst it was originally believed that Phiri was also the youngest player to do so (having scored his 50th goal in a friendly match against Sierra Leone on 6 July 1978, aged 23 years, 8 months and 6 days), FIFA acknowledged in 2021 that the record actually belonged to Mokhtar Dahari, who was 22 years, 8 months and 30 days when he scored his 50th goal for Malaysia against India on 12 August 1976. Stern John of Trinidad and Tobago was the first player from North America to score 50 international goals. He scored 70 goals in 115 matches, with his 50th goal coming in a friendly match against the Dominican Republic on 13 June 2004.

== By player ==
As of 17 November 2026

Players in bold are still active at international level.

Indicates the top scorer of the respective confederation.
Indicates the top scorer of the respective nation.

Rank	Player	Nation	Confederation	Goals	Caps	Goals per match	Career span	Date of 50th goal	Ref.
1	Cristiano Ronaldo	Portugal	UEFA	146	234	0.62	2003–2026	26 June 2014	
2	Lionel Messi	Argentina	CONMEBOL	126	208	0.61	2005–2026	29 March 2016	
3	Ali Daei	Iran	AFC	108 (Note: The match against Ecuador Olympic team was considered official for two decades before the Ecuador FA reconsidered, so FIFA no longer recognizes Ali Daei's goal there and, as a result, his number of goals has been reduced to 108 in 148 matches.)	148	0.73	1993–2006	9 January 2000	
4	Sunil Chhetri	India	AFC	95	157 (Note: RSSSF mistakenly count the match at 2007 AFC Asian Cup qualification between Yemen and India, but in fact Chhetri only played one match in 2006. It was in a 0–3 defeat to Japan in the same competition.)	0.61	2005–2025	31 December 2015	
5	Romelu Lukaku	Belgium	UEFA	94	135	0.7	2010–2026	10 October 2019	
6	**Harry Kane**	England	UEFA	93	127	0.73	2015–	7 June 2022	
7	**Robert Lewandowski**	Poland	UEFA	92	172	0.53	2008–	5 October 2017	
8	Mokhtar Dahari	Malaysia	AFC	89	142	0.63	1972–1985	22 August 1976	
9	Ali Mabkhout	United Arab Emirates	AFC	85	115	0.74	2009–2024	31 August 2019	
10	Ferenc Puskás	Hungary; Spain	UEFA	84	89	0.94	1945–1962	24 July 1952	
11	Neymar	Brazil	CONMEBOL	80	130	0.62	2010–2026	11 November 2016	
12	Godfrey Chitalu	Zambia	CAF	79	111	0.71	1968–1980	7 November 1978	
13	Hussein Saeed	Iraq	AFC	78	137	0.57	1977–1990	17 March 1984	
14	Pelé	Brazil	CONMEBOL	77	92	0.84	1957–1971	4 July 1965	
15	Vivian Woodward (Note: Vivian Woodward scored 29 goals in 23 matches for the professional England team between 1903 and 1911, and 46 goals in 30 matches for the England amateur side between 1906 and 1914; all matches for the Amateur side were considered official internationals for their respective opponents.)	England; England amateurs	UEFA	75	53	1.42	1903–1914	31 May 1909	
15	Sándor Kocsis	Hungary	UEFA	75	68	1.1	1948–1956	19 September 1954	
15	Kunishige Kamamoto	Japan	AFC	75	76	0.99	1964–1977	18 July 1972	
15	Bashar Abdullah	Kuwait	AFC	75	134	0.56	1996–2007	25 December 2002	
19	Edin Džeko	Bosnia and Herzegovina	UEFA	73	152	0.48	2007–2026	28 March 2017	
20	Majed Abdullah	Saudi Arabia	AFC	72	117	0.62	1977–1994	15 April 1984	
21	Kinnah Phiri	Malawi	CAF	71	117	0.61	1973–1981	6 July 1978	
21	Kiatisuk Senamuang	Thailand	AFC	71	134	0.53	1993–2007	23 January 2001	
21	Miroslav Klose	Germany	UEFA	71	137	0.52	2001–2014	27 June 2010	
24	Piyapong Pue-on	Thailand	AFC	70	100	0.7	1981–1997	30 January 1989	
24	Abdul Kadir	Indonesia	AFC	70	111	0.63	1967–1979	8 August 1972	
24	Stern John	Trinidad and Tobago	CONCACAF	70	115	0.61	1995–2012	13 June 2004	
24	**Mohamed Salah**	Egypt	CAF	70 (Note: The matches against Swaziland and Zambia in 2013 are not considered official internationals by FIFA, but they are recognised by the Egyptian Football Association. Salah scored twice in the Swaziland game, which is why the EFA credits him with 70 goals for Egypt while FIFA only credits him with 68.)	124	0.56	2011–	24 March 2023	
28	Luis Suárez	Uruguay	CONMEBOL	69	143	0.48	2007–2024	23 March 2018	
28	Hossam Hassan	Egypt	CAF	69	177	0.39	1985–2006	25 February 1998	
30	**Erling Haaland**	Norway	UEFA	68	61	1.11	2019–	11 October 2025	
30	Gerd Müller	West Germany	UEFA	68	62	1.1	1966–1974	18 June 1972	
30	Carlos Ruiz	Guatemala	CONCACAF	68	133	0.51	1998–2016	15 August 2012	
30	Robbie Keane	Republic of Ireland	UEFA	68	146	0.47	1998–2016	4 June 2011	
33	**Kylian Mbappé**	France	UEFA	67	108	0.62	2017–	8 June 2025	
35	Didier Drogba	Ivory Coast	CAF	65	105	0.62	2002–2014	13 January 2012	
36	**Aleksandar Mitrović**	Serbia	UEFA	64	108	0.59	2013–	27 September 2022	
36	**Teerasil Dangda**	Thailand	AFC	64	130	0.49	2007–	14 December 2021	
38	Jasem Al-Huwaidi	Kuwait	AFC	63	83	0.76	1992–2003	30 September 2000	
39	Ronaldo	Brazil	CONMEBOL	62	98	0.63	1994–2011	19 November 2003	
39	Ahmed Radhi	Iraq	AFC	62	121	0.51	1982–1997	18 August 1992	
39	Zlatan Ibrahimović	Sweden	UEFA	62	122	0.51	2001–2023	4 September 2014	
42	Abdul Ghani Minhat	Malaya Malaysia	AFC	61	71	0.86	1956–1966	15 December 1961	
42	**Almoez Ali**	Qatar	AFC	61	134	0.46	2013–	31 December 2023	
44	**Mehdi Taremi**	Iran	AFC	60	111 (Note: The matches against Burkina Faso and Indonesia in 2024 are not considered official internationals by FIFA, but they are recognised by the Football Federation Islamic Republic of Iran.)	0.54	2015–	6 June 2024	
44	**Yousef Nasser**	Kuwait	AFC	60	135	0.44	2009–	5 September 2024	
46	Imre Schlosser	Hungary	UEFA	59	68	0.87	1906–1927	3 June 1917	
46	David Villa	Spain	UEFA	59	98	0.6	2005–2017	11 October 2011	
46	**Son Heung-min**	South Korea	AFC	59	155	0.38	2010–	14 November 2024	
49	**Sardar Azmoun**	Iran	AFC	58	95	0.61	2014–	14 January 2024	
49	**Ali Ashfaq**	Maldives	AFC	58	101	0.57	2003–	29 March 2016	
49	Cha Bum-kun	South Korea	AFC	58	136	0.43	1972–1986	5 September 1977	
49	Edinson Cavani	Uruguay	CONMEBOL	58	136	0.43	2008–2022	18 November 2019	
53	Carlos Pavón	Honduras	CONCACAF	57	101	0.56	1993–2010	28 March 2009	
53	Olivier Giroud	France	UEFA	57	137	0.42	2011–2024	22 November 2022	
53	Clint Dempsey	United States	CONCACAF	57	141	0.4	2004–2018	7 June 2016	
53	Younis Mahmoud	Iraq	AFC	57	148	0.39	2002–2016	5 March 2014	
53	Landon Donovan	United States	CONCACAF	57	157	0.36	2000–2014	5 July 2013	
58	Gabriel Batistuta	Argentina	CONMEBOL	56	78	0.72	1991–2002	29 June 2000	
58	Samuel Eto'o	Cameroon	CAF	56	118	0.47	1997–2014	3 September 2011	
58	Bader Al-Mutawa	Kuwait	AFC	56 (Note: RSSSF does not include a goal in a match played on 29 July 2005 against UAE and a goal in a match played on 25 March 2022 against Latvia, and also wrongly attributes a goal on Al-Mutawa in the match played on 10 September 2018 against Iraq. NFT (National-Football-Teams) includes a goal in the match played on 17 December 2011 against Saudi Arabia (U-23), a match though recognized neither by FIFA nor by RSSSF, and therefore it is not included here.)	202	0.28	2003–2022	3 September 2015	
61	Romário	Brazil	CONMEBOL	55	70	0.79	1987–2005	8 October 2000	
61	Kazuyoshi Miura	Japan	AFC	55	89	0.62	1990–2000	7 September 1997	
61	Jan Koller	Czech Republic	UEFA	55	91	0.6	1999–2009	8 September 2007	
61	Iswadi Idris	Indonesia	AFC	55	97	0.57	1968–1980	19 November 1977	
61	Fandi Ahmad	Singapore	AFC	55	101	0.54	1979–1997	16 December 1995	
61	Joachim Streich	East Germany	UEFA	55 (Note: 4 Olympic matches are not recognised as official by FIFA, but were official for the East German FA.)	102	0.54	1969–1984	26 July 1983	
61	**Memphis Depay**	Netherlands	UEFA	55	112	0.49	2013–	10 June 2025	
61	**Sadio Mané**	Senegal	CAF	55	132	0.42	2012–	18 November 2025	
69	Wayne Rooney	England	UEFA	53	120	0.44	2003–2018	8 September 2015	
70	Poul Nielsen	Denmark	UEFA	52	38	1.37	1910–1925	14 June 1925	
70	Phil Younghusband	Philippines	AFC	52	108	0.48	2006–2019	22 March 2018	
70	Javier Hernández	Mexico	CONCACAF	52	109	0.48	2009–2019	23 June 2018	
70	Jon Dahl Tomasson	Denmark	UEFA	52	112	0.46	1997–2010	21 November 2007	
70	Adnan Al Talyani	United Arab Emirates	AFC	52	161	0.32	1983–1997	19 November 1996	
75	Lajos Tichy	Hungary	UEFA	51	72	0.71	1955–1971	25 April 1964	
75	Lê Công Vinh	Vietnam	AFC	51	83	0.61	2004–2016	20 November 2016	
75	Asamoah Gyan	Ghana	CAF	51	109	0.47	2003–2019	11 June 2017	
75	Hakan Şükür	Turkey	UEFA	51	112	0.46	1992–2007	11 October 2006	
75	Thierry Henry	France	UEFA	51	123	0.41	1997–2010	9 September 2009	
75	**Alexis Sánchez**	Chile	CONMEBOL	51	168	0.3	2006–	27 September 2022	
81	Karim Bagheri	Iran	AFC	50	87	0.57	1993–2010	9 January 2009	
81	Robin van Persie	Netherlands	UEFA	50	102	0.49	2005–2017	13 October 2015	
81	Hwang Sun-hong	South Korea	AFC	50	103	0.49	1988–2002	4 June 2002	
81	Tim Cahill	Australia	AFC / OFC (Note: Football Federation of Australia (FFA) was a member of OFC since its formation in 1966, but in 2006 FFA left OFC and joined AFC. Tim Cahill debuted for Australia in 2004 when FFA was an OFC member and ended his international career in 2018.)	50	108	0.46	2004–2018	10 October 2017	
81	Shinji Okazaki	Japan	AFC	50	119	0.42	2008–2019	28 March 2017	
81	**Salomón Rondón**	Venezuela	CONMEBOL	50	122	0.41	2008–	27 March 2026	
81	Zainal Abidin Hassan	Malaysia	AFC	50	129	0.39	1980–1997	31 March 1997	

== By nationality ==
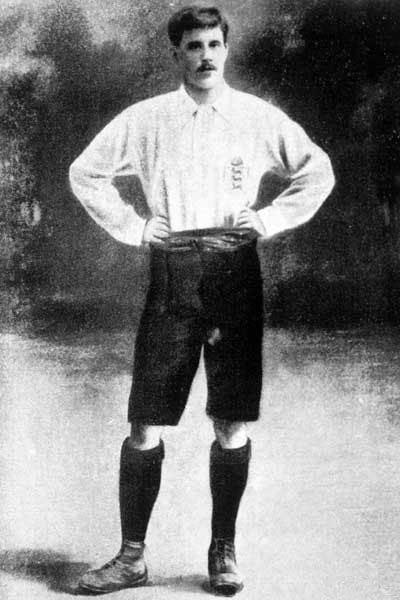
Vivian Woodward was the first player to score 50 international goals and the fastest to achieve the feat, scoring his 50th goal in his 32nd match.

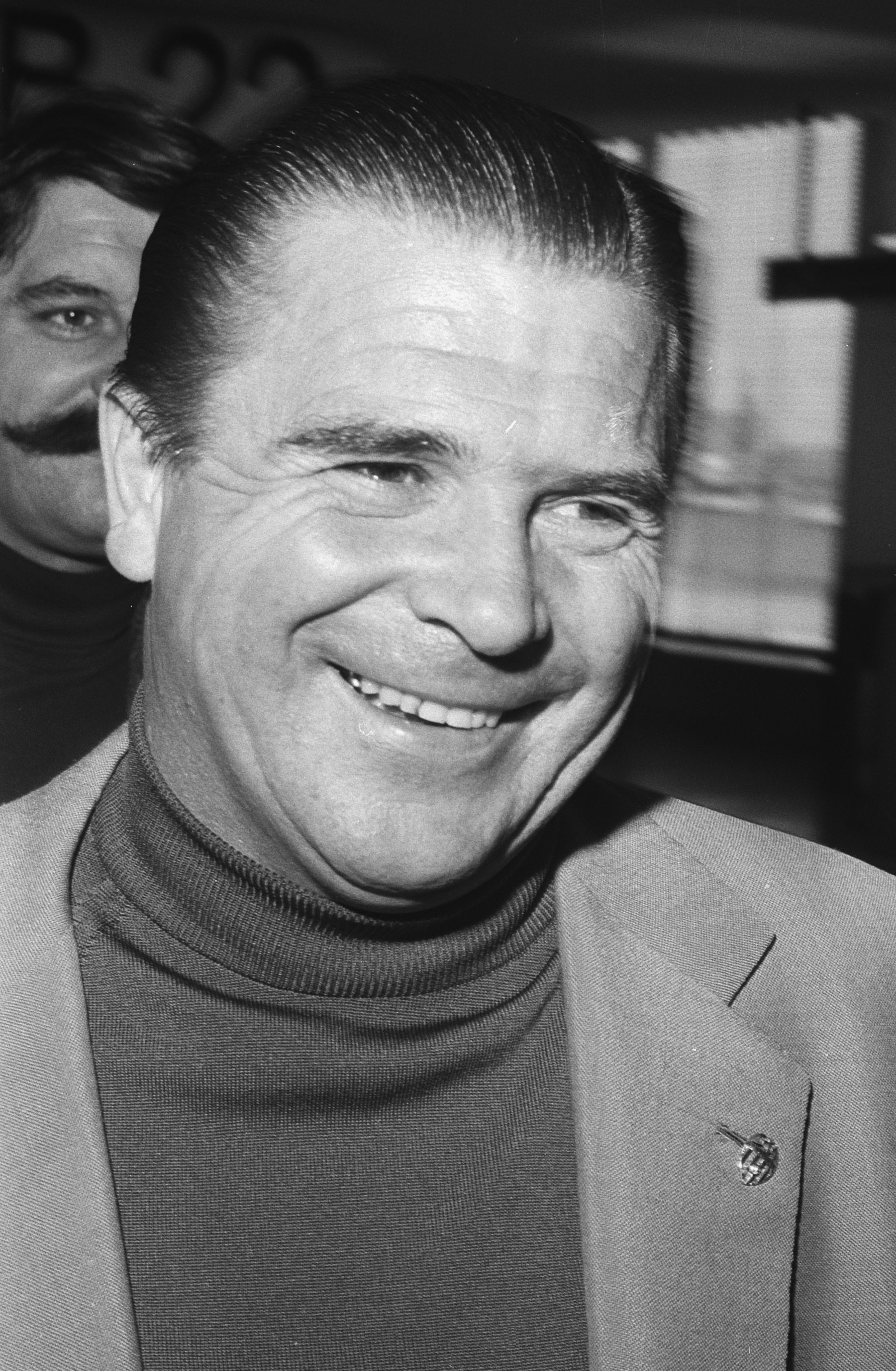
Ferenc Puskás held the record of the highest number of international goals with 84 for 47 years, following his 84th goal in 1956 against Austria, until Ali Daei broke it in 2003.

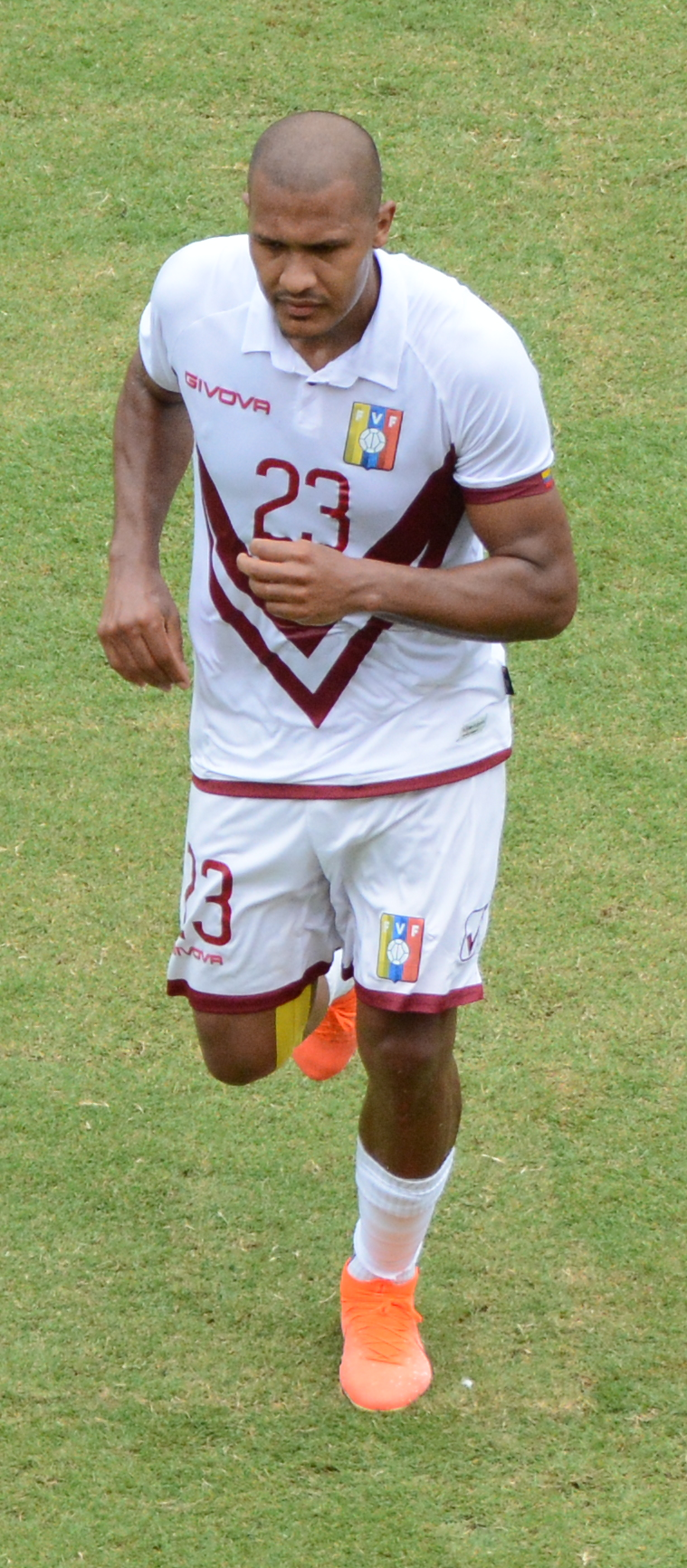
Salomón Rondón was the most recent player to reach 50 international goals.

As of 17 November 2026 (UTC)

*NB: The term "nationality" in this section refers to the nation(s) the player represented (the national team(s) he played for), not to the nationality-ies and/or citizenship(s) he holds.

Players	Country	Confederation
4	Brazil	CONMEBOL
4	Hungary	UEFA
4	Iran	AFC
4	Kuwait	AFC
3	England England amateurs (Note: Vivian Woodward played for both England and England amateurs.)	UEFA
3	France	UEFA
3	Iraq	AFC
3	Japan	AFC
3	Malaysia Malaya (Note: Abdul Ghani played both for Malaya and Malaysia.)	AFC
3	South Korea	AFC
3	Thailand	AFC
2	Argentina	CONMEBOL
2	Denmark	UEFA
2	Egypt	CAF
2	Germany West Germany	UEFA
2	Indonesia	AFC
2	Netherlands	UEFA
2	United Arab Emirates	AFC
2	United States	CONCACAF
2	Uruguay	CONMEBOL
1	Australia	AFC / OFC
1	Belgium	UEFA
1	Bosnia and Herzegovina	UEFA
1	Cameroon	CAF
1	Chile	CONMEBOL
1	Czech Republic	UEFA
1	East Germany	UEFA
1	Ghana	CAF
1	Guatemala	CONCACAF
1	Honduras	CONCACAF
1	India	AFC
1	Ivory Coast	CAF
1	Malawi	CAF
1	Maldives	AFC
1	Mexico	CONCACAF
1	Norway	UEFA
1	Philippines	AFC
1	Poland	UEFA
1	Portugal	UEFA
1	Qatar	AFC
1	Republic of Ireland	UEFA
1	Saudi Arabia	AFC
1	Senegal	CAF
1	Serbia	UEFA
1	Singapore	AFC
1	Spain (Note: Ferenc Puskás played four matches for Spain; 1 in the World Cup qualifiers in 1961 and 3 in the 1962 World Cup, but did not score any goal in these matches.)	UEFA
1	Sweden	UEFA
1	Trinidad and Tobago	CONCACAF
1	Turkey	UEFA
1	Venezuela	CONMEBOL
1	Vietnam	AFC
1	Zambia	CAF
87	52	5

== By confederation ==
As of 17 November 2026 (UTC)

Confederation	Countries	Players
AFC	17	35
UEFA	18	28
CONMEBOL	5	10
CAF	7	8
CONCACAF	5	6
OFC	0	0
Total	52	87

No OFC player has scored 50 goals in full internationals. The current record holders are Fiji player Roy Krishna with 47 goals in 68 matches and New Zealand player Chris Wood with 47 goals in 97 matches.

== See also ==
- List of women's footballers with 100 or more international caps
- List of top international men's football goalscorers by country
- List of men's footballers with 100 or more international caps
- List of men's footballers with the most official appearances
- List of men's footballers with 500 or more goals
- List of goalscoring goalkeepers
- List of hat-tricks
