= List of international goals scored by Hossam Hassan =

Hossam Hassan is a retired footballer who represented the Egypt national football team and is his country's all-time second highest goalscorer with 69 goals. He appeared 177 times for Egypt between 1985 and 2006. He made his debut on 10 September 1985 in a friendly against Norway at the Ullevaal Stadion in Oslo. His first international goal came during the 1988 Arab Nations Cup, scoring the third goal in a 3–0 win over Lebanon on 15 July 1988.

Hassan became his country's top scorer when he scored his 43rd goal against Togo in a friendly in December 1997; at the time the record of 42 was held by Hassan El-Shazly. In November 2026, Mohamed Salah beat his record after scoring his 70th goal against Malawi.

Out of Hassan's 69 goals, 42 were in official matches while 27 came in friendlies. Hassan has scored more goals (six) against Ethiopia than any other nation. Hassan scored one hat-trick in his international career, coming in a 4–0 win over Zambia at the 1998 Africa Cup of Nations, where Hassan was also the tournament joint top scorer with seven goals, sharing the honour with Benni McCarthy.

== International goals ==
Scores and results list Egypt's goal tally first.

International goals by date, venue, opponent, score, result and competition
No.	Date	Venue	Opponent	Score	Result	Competition
1	15 July 1988	Amman International Stadium, Amman, Jordan	Lebanon	3–0	3–0	1988 Arab Nations Cup
2	21 July 1988	Amman International Stadium, Amman, Jordan	Jordan	2–0	2–0	1988 Arab Nations Cup
3	21 April 1989	Cairo International Stadium, Cairo, Egypt	Ethiopia	5–1	6–1	1990 Africa Cup of Nations qualification
4	21 April 1989	Cairo International Stadium, Cairo, Egypt	Ethiopia	6–1	6–1	1990 Africa Cup of Nations qualification
5	16 July 1989	Cairo International Stadium, Cairo, Egypt	Zaire	1–0	2–0	1990 Africa Cup of Nations qualification
6	16 September 1989	Olympic Stadium, Seoul, South Korea	South Korea	1–0	1–0	Friendly
7	3 November 1989	Khalifa International Stadium, Doha, Qatar	Qatar	1–0	2–0	Friendly
8	17 November 1989	Cairo International Stadium, Cairo, Egypt	Algeria	1–0	1–0	1990 World Cup qualification
9	16 May 1990	Pittodrie Stadium, Aberdeen, Scotland	Scotland	2–0	3–1	Friendly
10	26 May 1990	Cairo International Stadium, Cairo, Egypt	Colombia	1–0	1–1	Friendly
11	17 August 1990	Cairo International Stadium, Cairo, Egypt	Ethiopia	2–0	2–0	1992 Africa Cup of Nations qualification
12	9 June 1991	Olympic Stadium, Seoul, South Korea	Malta	5–2	5–2	1991 Korea Cup
13	11 June 1991	Olympic Stadium, Seoul, South Korea	Indonesia	3–0	6–0	1991 Korea Cup
14	12 July 1991	Cairo International Stadium, Cairo, Egypt	Chad	3–1	5–1	1992 Africa Cup of Nations qualification
15	21 December 1991	Cairo International Stadium, Cairo, Egypt	Romania	2–0	3–0	Friendly
16	23 July 1992	Ahmadou Ahidjo, Yaoundé, Cameroon	Cameroon	1–0	1–0	Friendly
–	18 September 1992	Al-Hamadaniah, Aleppo, Syria	Saudi Arabia	3–2	3–2	1992 Arab Nations Cup ^{1}
17	11 October 1992	Cairo International Stadium, Cairo, Egypt	Angola	1–0	1–0	1994 World Cup qualification
18	25 October 1992	Général Eyadema, Lomé, Togo	Togo	2–0	4–1	1994 World Cup qualification
19	25 October 1992	Général Eyadema, Lomé, Togo	Togo	4–1	4–1	1994 World Cup qualification
20	31 January 1993	Cairo International Stadium, Cairo, Egypt	Togo	1–0	3–0	1994 World Cup qualification
21	28 February 1993	Cairo International Stadium, Cairo, Egypt	Zimbabwe	2–1	2–1	1994 World Cup qualification
22	9 April 1993	Cairo International Stadium, Cairo, Egypt	Mali	1–0	2–1	1994 Africa Cup of Nations qualification
23	5 November 1993	El Menzah, Tunis, Tunisia	Malta	1–0	3–0	Friendly
24	2 February 1994	Sharjah Stadium, Sharjah, United Arab Emirates	Morocco	1–1	1–1	Friendly
25	4 February 1994	Sharjah Stadium, Sharjah, United Arab Emirates	Slovakia	1–0	1–0	Friendly
26	6 February 1994	Sharjah Stadium, Sharjah, United Arab Emirates	United Arab Emirates	1–0	1–0	Friendly
27	19 August 1994	Cairo International Stadium, Cairo, Egypt	Mali	1–0	2–0	Friendly
28	19 August 1994	Cairo International Stadium, Cairo, Egypt	Mali	2–1	2–0	Friendly
29	23 August 1994	Cairo International Stadium, Cairo, Egypt	Ghana	1–0	2–0	Friendly
30	23 August 1994	Cairo International Stadium, Cairo, Egypt	Ghana	2–0	2–0	Friendly
31	14 October 1994	Cairo International Stadium, Cairo, Egypt	Tanzania	4–1	5–1	1996 Africa Cup of Nations qualification
32	11 November 1994	Cairo International Stadium, Cairo, Egypt	Ethiopia	1–0	5–0	1996 Africa Cup of Nations qualification
33	11 November 1994	Cairo International Stadium, Cairo, Egypt	Ethiopia	3–0	5–0	1996 Africa Cup of Nations qualification
34	4 October 1996	Cairo International Stadium, Cairo, Egypt	Morocco	1–1	1–1	1998 Africa Cup of Nations qualification
35	8 November 1996	Cairo International Stadium, Cairo, Egypt	Namibia	6–1	7–1	1998 World Cup qualification
36	8 November 1996	Cairo International Stadium, Cairo, Egypt	Namibia	7–1	7–1	1998 World Cup qualification
37	5 January 1997	Alexandria Stadium, Alexandria, Egypt	Belarus	1–0	2–0	Friendly
38	26 April 1997	Independence Stadium, Windhoek, Namibia	Namibia	1–1	3–2	1998 World Cup qualification
39	26 April 1997	Independence Stadium, Windhoek, Namibia	Namibia	3–2	3–2	1998 World Cup qualification
40	27 July 1997	Alexandria Stadium, Alexandria, Egypt	Ethiopia	6–0	8–1	1998 Africa Cup of Nations qualification
41	18 December 1997	Aswan Stadium, Aswan, Egypt	Togo	5–1	7–2	Friendly
42	18 December 1997	Aswan Stadium, Aswan, Egypt	Togo	6–1	7–2	Friendly
43	31 January 1998	National Stadium, Bangkok, Thailand	South Korea	1–0	1–1	1998 King's Cup
44	10 February 1998	Stade Municipal, Bobo Dioulasso, Burkina Faso	Mozambique	1–0	2–0	1998 Africa Cup of Nations
45	10 February 1998	Stade Municipal, Bobo Dioulasso, Burkina Faso	Mozambique	2–0	2–0	1998 Africa Cup of Nations
46	13 February 1998	Stade Municipal, Bobo Dioulasso, Burkina Faso	Zambia	1–0	4–0	1998 Africa Cup of Nations
47	13 February 1998	Stade Municipal, Bobo Dioulasso, Burkina Faso	Zambia	2–0	4–0	1998 Africa Cup of Nations
48	13 February 1998	Stade Municipal, Bobo Dioulasso, Burkina Faso	Zambia	3–0	4–0	1998 Africa Cup of Nations
49	25 February 1998	Stade Municipal, Bobo Dioulasso, Burkina Faso	Burkina Faso	1–0	2–0	1998 Africa Cup of Nations
50	25 February 1998	Stade Municipal, Bobo Dioulasso, Burkina Faso	Burkina Faso	2–0	2–0	1998 Africa Cup of Nations
51	23 September 1998	Kadriorg Stadium, Tallinn, Estonia	Estonia	2–2	2–2	Friendly
52	29 September 1998	Milano Arena, Kumanovo, Macedonia	Macedonia	1–2	2–2	Friendly
53	18 November 1998	Cairo International Stadium, Cairo, Egypt	Norway	1–0	1–1	Friendly
54	16 December 1998	Soccer City, Johannesburg, South Africa	South Africa	1–0	1–2	Friendly
55	27 December 1998	Kuwait National Stadium, Kuwait City, Kuwait	Kuwait	1–1	1–1	Friendly
56	12 February 1999	Hong Kong Stadium, So Kon Po, Hong Kong	Bulgaria	1–0	3–1	1999 Lunar New Year Cup
57	12 February 1999	Hong Kong Stadium, So Kon Po, Hong Kong	Bulgaria	2–0	3–1	1999 Lunar New Year Cup
58	13 June 1999	Olympic Stadium, Seoul, South Korea	Croatia	1–0	2–2	1999 Korea Cup
59	13 June 1999	Olympic Stadium, Seoul, South Korea	Croatia	2–0	2–2	1999 Korea Cup
60	6 January 2000	Aswan Stadium, Aswan, Egypt	Gabon	2–0	4–0	Friendly
61	23 January 2000	Sani Abacha Stadium, Kano, Nigeria	Zambia	2–0	2–0	2000 Africa Cup of Nations
62	28 January 2000	Sani Abacha Stadium, Kano, Nigeria	Senegal	1–0	1–0	2000 Africa Cup of Nations
63	2 February 2000	Sani Abacha Stadium, Kano, Nigeria	Burkina Faso	2–2	4–2	2000 Africa Cup of Nations
64	7 June 2000	Azadi Stadium, Tehran, Iran	Iran	1–0	1–1	2000 LG Cup
65	25 August 2000	Port Said Stadium, Port Said, Egypt	Kenya	2–1	2–1	Friendly
66	8 October 2000	Al-Merrikh Stadium, Omdurman, Sudan	Sudan	1–0	1–0	2002 Africa Cup of Nations qualification
67	29 May 2004	Cairo International Stadium, Cairo, Egypt	Gabon	1–0	2–0	Friendly
68	29 May 2004	Cairo International Stadium, Cairo, Egypt	Gabon	2–0	2–0	Friendly
69	3 February 2006	Cairo International Stadium, Cairo, Egypt	DR Congo	2–0	4–1	2006 Africa Cup of Nations

^{1} The 1992 Arab Nations Cup matches are not considered as A-internationals by FIFA as Egypt sent their Olympic team.

== Statistics ==
Goals by competition
Competition	Goals
Friendlies	27
Africa Cup of Nations	11
Africa Cup of Nations qualification	11
FIFA World Cup qualification	10
Arab Nations Cup	2
Korea Cup	3
Lunar New Year Cup	2
LG Cup	1
King's Cup	1
Total	69

Goals by Confederation
Confederation	Goals
CAF	46
UEFA	12
AFC	10
CONMEBOL	1
Total	69

== See also ==
- List of footballers with 50 or more international goals
- List of top international men's association football goal scorers by country
