= List of international goals scored by Harry Kane =

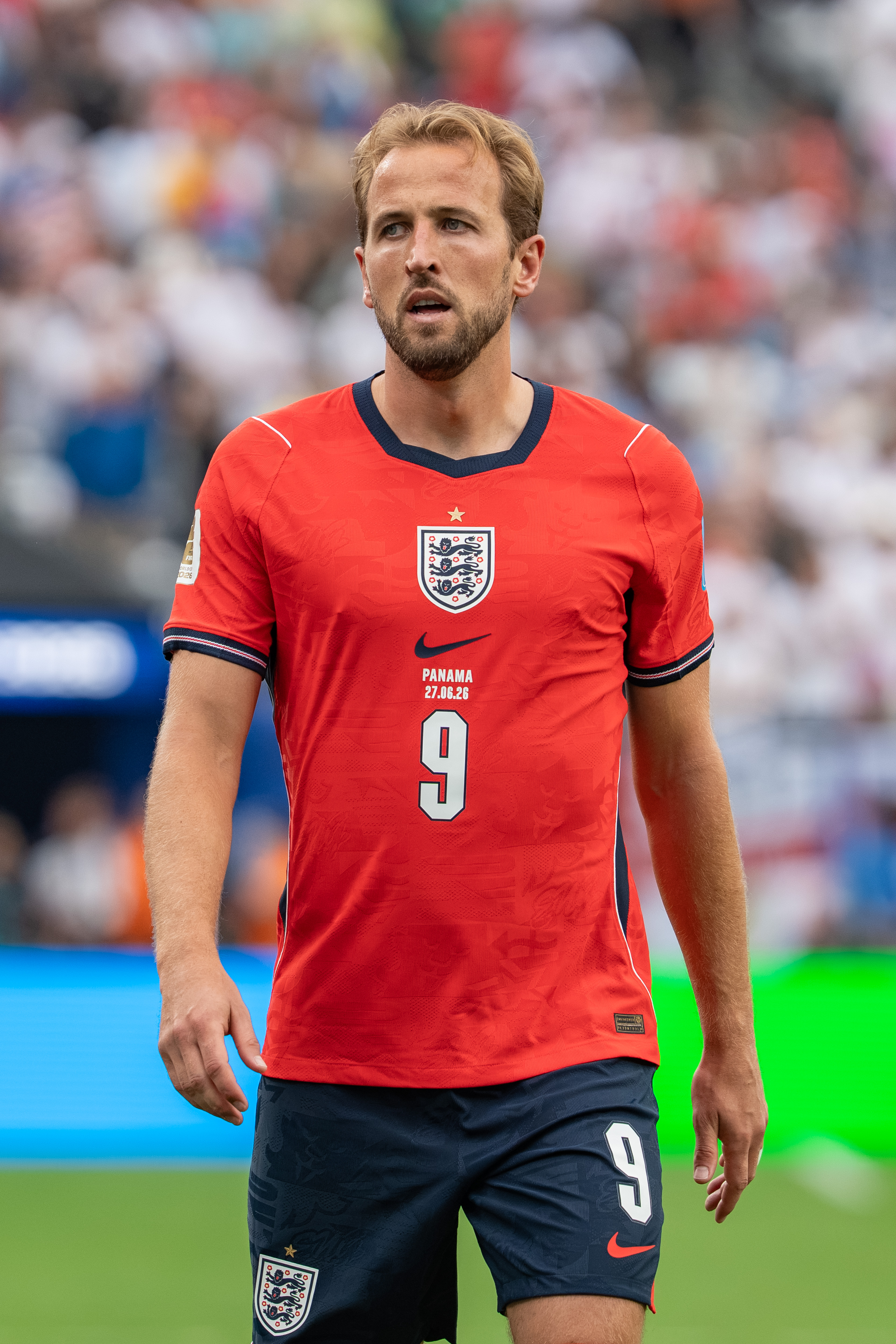
Kane (pictured in 2026) has scored 93 international goals since making his debut for England in 2015.

Harry Kane is an English footballer who has represented the England national team as a forward since 2015. He has been England captain since 2018. Kane made his debut for England in a 4–0 home win over Lithuania and scored after 80 seconds. From that beginning, Kane has scored 93 goals in 127 international appearances, making him the country's all-time top scorer. Kane surpassed England's then second-highest goalscorer Bobby Charlton (49) on 7 June 2022 with his penalty kick against Germany, having equalled Charlton's tally three months prior against Switzerland; also from the penalty spot. He equalled Wayne Rooney's record of 53 goals on 10 December 2022 in the 2022 FIFA World Cup quarter-final against France with a penalty in the 54th minute, and surpassed it in a UEFA Euro 2024 qualifying match against Italy on 23 March 2023 with a penalty in the 44th minute.

Kane has played for England in the qualifying campaigns of every World Cup and European Championship since 2015. During Euro 2016 qualifying, he scored three goals in four appearances to help England qualify for the tournament, where they were knocked out by Iceland. During 2018 World Cup qualification, Kane appeared in six of England's ten qualifiers and scored five goals, including winning goals in their last two matches against Slovenia and Lithuania. Kane became captain of England for the 2018 World Cup, where he led them to their first World Cup semi-final in 28 years and scored six goals, winning the Golden Boot. During Euro 2020 qualifying, Kane scored in each of England's eight qualifying matches to help the team win their group. He scored twelve goals in total, more than any other player during the qualifying stage. During Euro 2020, Kane scored four goals, including the winner against Denmark in the semi-final, as England reached their first international final since 1966. During 2022 World Cup qualification, Kane scored twelve goals in eight appearances, the most of any European player, as England topped their qualifying group again. He also became the fourth England player to score consecutive hat-tricks after he did so in their last two games against Albania and San Marino. At Euro 2024, Kane finished as the tournament's joint-top scorer with three goals, as he captained England to a second consecutive final.

On 24 June 2018, Kane scored his first international hat-trick in England's 6–1 win over Panama at the 2018 World Cup, which was England's largest World Cup victory. In this match, Kane became the third England player to score a hat-trick in a World Cup match, after Geoff Hurst against West Germany in the 1966 final and Gary Lineker against Poland in 1986. He has scored five international hat-tricks, and on one occasion, four international goals in a single match during England's 10–0 win against San Marino, their largest margin of victory in a competitive match.

Kane has scored more goals from penalty kicks than any other England player, having scored 28 penalties in 33 attempts. Kane also has the most England goals scored in competitive matches, having scored 83 of his 93 goals in non-friendly fixtures. Kane has also scored the most goals (73) while captaining England. He surpassed Vivian Woodward's record on 14 November 2019 when he scored his third international hat-trick at home to Montenegro in a Euro 2020 qualifying match, which was also England's 1,000th international game.

== Goals ==
As of match played 15 November 2026
England score listed first, score column indicates score after each Kane goal

Table key
| ‡ | Indicates goal was scored from a penalty kick |
| | Indicates England won the match |
| | Indicates the match ended in a draw |
| | Indicates England lost the match |

List of international goals scored by Harry Kane
| No. | Cap | Date | Venue | Opponent | Score | Result | Competition | Ref. |
|---|---|---|---|---|---|---|---|---|
| 1 | 1 | 27 March 2015 | Wembley Stadium, London, England | Lithuania | 4–0 | 4–0 | UEFA Euro 2016 qualifying | |
| 2 | 3 | 5 September 2015 | San Marino Stadium, Serravalle, San Marino | San Marino | 5–0 | 6–0 | UEFA Euro 2016 qualifying | |
| 3 | 4 | 8 September 2015 | Wembley Stadium, London, England | Switzerland | 1–0 | 2–0 | UEFA Euro 2016 qualifying | |
| 4 | 9 | 26 March 2016 | Olympiastadion, Berlin, Germany | Germany | 1–2 | 3–2 | Friendly | |
| 5 | 11 | 22 May 2016 | City of Manchester Stadium, Manchester, England | Turkey | 1–0 | 2–1 | Friendly | |
| 6 | 18 | 10 June 2017 | Hampden Park, Glasgow, Scotland | Scotland | 2–2 | 2–2 | 2018 FIFA World Cup qualification | |
| 7 | 19 | 13 June 2017 | Stade de France, Saint-Denis, France | France | 1–0 | 2–3 | Friendly | |
| 8 | 19 | 13 June 2017 | Stade de France, Saint-Denis, France | France | 2–2‡ | 2–3 | Friendly | |
| 9 | 20 | 1 September 2017 | National Stadium, Ta' Qali, Malta | Malta | 1–0 | 4–0 | 2018 FIFA World Cup qualification | |
| 10 | 20 | 1 September 2017 | National Stadium, Ta' Qali, Malta | Malta | 4–0 | 4–0 | 2018 FIFA World Cup qualification | |
| 11 | 22 | 5 October 2017 | Wembley Stadium, London, England | Slovenia | 1–0 | 1–0 | 2018 FIFA World Cup qualification | |
| 12 | 23 | 8 October 2017 | LFF Stadium, Vilnius, Lithuania | Lithuania | 1–0‡ | 1–0 | 2018 FIFA World Cup qualification | |
| 13 | 24 | 2 June 2018 | Wembley Stadium, London, England | Nigeria | 2–0 | 2–1 | Friendly | |
| 14 | 25 | 18 June 2018 | Volgograd Arena, Volgograd, Russia | Tunisia | 1–0 | 2–1 | 2018 FIFA World Cup | |
| 15 | 25 | 18 June 2018 | Volgograd Arena, Volgograd, Russia | Tunisia | 2–1 | 2–1 | 2018 FIFA World Cup | |
| 16 | 26 | 24 June 2018 | Nizhny Novgorod Stadium, Nizhny Novgorod, Russia | Panama | 2–0‡ | 6–1 | 2018 FIFA World Cup | |
| 17 | 26 | 24 June 2018 | Nizhny Novgorod Stadium, Nizhny Novgorod, Russia | Panama | 5–0‡ | 6–1 | 2018 FIFA World Cup | |
| 18 | 26 | 24 June 2018 | Nizhny Novgorod Stadium, Nizhny Novgorod, Russia | Panama | 6–0 | 6–1 | 2018 FIFA World Cup | |
| 19 | 27 | 3 July 2018 | Otkritie Arena, Moscow, Russia | Colombia | 1–0‡ | 1–1 (a.e.t.) (4–3 p) | 2018 FIFA World Cup | |
| 20 | 35 | 18 November 2018 | Wembley Stadium, London, England | Croatia | 2–1 | 2–1 | 2018–19 UEFA Nations League A | |
| 21 | 36 | 22 March 2019 | Wembley Stadium, London, England | Czech Republic | 2–0‡ | 5–0 | UEFA Euro 2020 qualifying | |
| 22 | 37 | 25 March 2019 | Podgorica City Stadium, Podgorica, Montenegro | Montenegro | 4–1 | 5–1 | UEFA Euro 2020 qualifying | |
| 23 | 40 | 7 September 2019 | Wembley Stadium, London, England | Bulgaria | 1–0 | 4–0 | UEFA Euro 2020 qualifying | |
| 24 | 40 | 7 September 2019 | Wembley Stadium, London, England | Bulgaria | 2–0‡ | 4–0 | UEFA Euro 2020 qualifying | |
| 25 | 40 | 7 September 2019 | Wembley Stadium, London, England | Bulgaria | 4–0‡ | 4–0 | UEFA Euro 2020 qualifying | |
| 26 | 41 | 10 September 2019 | St Mary's Stadium, Southampton, England | Kosovo | 2–1 | 5–3 | UEFA Euro 2020 qualifying | |
| 27 | 42 | 11 October 2019 | Sinobo Stadium, Prague, Czech Republic | Czech Republic | 1–0‡ | 1–2 | UEFA Euro 2020 qualifying | |
| 28 | 43 | 14 October 2019 | Vasil Levski National Stadium, Sofia, Bulgaria | Bulgaria | 6–0 | 6–0 | UEFA Euro 2020 qualifying | |
| 29 | 44 | 14 November 2019 | Wembley Stadium, London, England | Montenegro | 2–0 | 7–0 | UEFA Euro 2020 qualifying | |
| 30 | 44 | 14 November 2019 | Wembley Stadium, London, England | Montenegro | 3–0 | 7–0 | UEFA Euro 2020 qualifying | |
| 31 | 44 | 14 November 2019 | Wembley Stadium, London, England | Montenegro | 5–0 | 7–0 | UEFA Euro 2020 qualifying | |
| 32 | 45 | 17 November 2019 | Fadil Vokrri Stadium, Pristina, Kosovo | Kosovo | 2–0 | 4–0 | UEFA Euro 2020 qualifying | |
| 33 | 52 | 28 March 2021 | Arena Kombëtare, Tirana, Albania | Albania | 1–0 | 2–0 | 2022 FIFA World Cup qualification | |
| 34 | 53 | 31 March 2021 | Wembley Stadium, London, England | Poland | 1–0‡ | 2–1 | 2022 FIFA World Cup qualification | |
| 35 | 58 | 29 June 2021 | Wembley Stadium, London, England | Germany | 2–0 | 2–0 | UEFA Euro 2020 | |
| 36 | 59 | 3 July 2021 | Stadio Olimpico, Rome, Italy | Ukraine | 1–0 | 4–0 | UEFA Euro 2020 | |
| 37 | 59 | 3 July 2021 | Stadio Olimpico, Rome, Italy | Ukraine | 3–0 | 4–0 | UEFA Euro 2020 | |
| 38 | 60 | 7 July 2021 | Wembley Stadium, London, England | Denmark | 2–1 | 2–1 (a.e.t.) | UEFA Euro 2020 | |
| 39 | 62 | 2 September 2021 | Puskás Aréna, Budapest, Hungary | Hungary | 2–0 | 4–0 | 2022 FIFA World Cup qualification | |
| 40 | 63 | 5 September 2021 | Wembley Stadium, London, England | Andorra | 2–0‡ | 4–0 | 2022 FIFA World Cup qualification | |
| 41 | 64 | 8 September 2021 | Stadion Narodowy, Warsaw, Poland | Poland | 1–0 | 1–1 | 2022 FIFA World Cup qualification | |
| 42 | 66 | 12 November 2021 | Wembley Stadium, London, England | Albania | 2–0 | 5–0 | 2022 FIFA World Cup qualification | |
| 43 | 66 | 12 November 2021 | Wembley Stadium, London, England | Albania | 4–0 | 5–0 | 2022 FIFA World Cup qualification | |
| 44 | 66 | 12 November 2021 | Wembley Stadium, London, England | Albania | 5–0 | 5–0 | 2022 FIFA World Cup qualification | |
| 45 | 67 | 15 November 2021 | San Marino Stadium, Serravalle, San Marino | San Marino | 3–0‡ | 10–0 | 2022 FIFA World Cup qualification | |
| 46 | 67 | 15 November 2021 | San Marino Stadium, Serravalle, San Marino | San Marino | 4–0 | 10–0 | 2022 FIFA World Cup qualification | |
| 47 | 67 | 15 November 2021 | San Marino Stadium, Serravalle, San Marino | San Marino | 5–0‡ | 10–0 | 2022 FIFA World Cup qualification | |
| 48 | 67 | 15 November 2021 | San Marino Stadium, Serravalle, San Marino | San Marino | 6–0 | 10–0 | 2022 FIFA World Cup qualification | |
| 49 | 68 | 26 March 2022 | Wembley Stadium, London, England | Switzerland | 2–1‡ | 2–1 | Friendly | |
| 50 | 71 | 7 June 2022 | Allianz Arena, Munich, Germany | Germany | 1–1‡ | 1–1 | 2022–23 UEFA Nations League A | |
| 51 | 75 | 26 September 2022 | Wembley Stadium, London, England | Germany | 3–2‡ | 3–3 | 2022–23 UEFA Nations League A | |
| 52 | 79 | 4 December 2022 | Al Bayt Stadium, Al Khor, Qatar | Senegal | 2–0 | 3–0 | 2022 FIFA World Cup | |
| 53 | 80 | 10 December 2022 | Al Bayt Stadium, Al Khor, Qatar | France | 1–1‡ | 1–2 | 2022 FIFA World Cup | |
| 54 | 81 | 23 March 2023 | Stadio Diego Armando Maradona, Naples, Italy | Italy | 2–0‡ | 2–1 | UEFA Euro 2024 qualifying | |
| 55 | 82 | 26 March 2023 | Wembley Stadium, London, England | Ukraine | 1–0 | 2–0 | UEFA Euro 2024 qualifying | |
| 56 | 83 | 16 June 2023 | National Stadium, Ta' Qali, Malta | Malta | 3–0‡ | 4–0 | UEFA Euro 2024 qualifying | |
| 57 | 84 | 19 June 2023 | Old Trafford, Manchester, England | North Macedonia | 1–0 | 7–0 | UEFA Euro 2024 qualifying | |
| 58 | 84 | 19 June 2023 | Old Trafford, Manchester, England | North Macedonia | 7–0‡ | 7–0 | UEFA Euro 2024 qualifying | |
| 59 | 86 | 12 September 2023 | Hampden Park, Glasgow, Scotland | Scotland | 3–1 | 3–1 | Friendly | |
| 60 | 87 | 17 October 2023 | Wembley Stadium, London, England | Italy | 1–1‡ | 3–1 | UEFA Euro 2024 qualifying | |
| 61 | 87 | 17 October 2023 | Wembley Stadium, London, England | Italy | 3–1 | 3–1 | UEFA Euro 2024 qualifying | |
| 62 | 88 | 17 November 2023 | Wembley Stadium, London, England | Malta | 2–0 | 2–0 | UEFA Euro 2024 qualifying | |
| 63 | 90 | 3 June 2024 | St James' Park, Newcastle upon Tyne, England | Bosnia and Herzegovina | 3–0 | 3–0 | Friendly | |
| 64 | 93 | 20 June 2024 | Waldstadion, Frankfurt, Germany | Denmark | 1–0 | 1–1 | UEFA Euro 2024 | |
| 65 | 95 | 30 June 2024 | Arena AufSchalke, Gelsenkirchen, Germany | Slovakia | 2–1 | 2–1 (a.e.t.) | UEFA Euro 2024 | |
| 66 | 97 | 10 July 2024 | Westfalenstadion, Dortmund, Germany | Netherlands | 1–1‡ | 2–1 | UEFA Euro 2024 | |
| 67 | 100 | 10 September 2024 | Wembley Stadium, London, England | Finland | 1–0 | 2–0 | 2024–25 UEFA Nations League B | |
| 68 | 100 | 10 September 2024 | Wembley Stadium, London, England | Finland | 2–0 | 2–0 | 2024–25 UEFA Nations League B | |
| 69 | 103 | 17 November 2024 | Wembley Stadium, London, England | Republic of Ireland | 1–0‡ | 5–0 | 2024–25 UEFA Nations League B | |
| 70 | 104 | 21 March 2025 | Wembley Stadium, London, England | Albania | 2–0 | 2–0 | 2026 FIFA World Cup qualification | |
| 71 | 105 | 24 March 2025 | Wembley Stadium, London, England | Latvia | 2–0 | 3–0 | 2026 FIFA World Cup qualification | |
| 72 | 106 | 7 June 2025 | RCDE Stadium, Barcelona, Spain | Andorra | 1–0 | 1–0 | 2026 FIFA World Cup qualification | |
| 73 | 107 | 10 June 2025 | City Ground, Nottingham, England | Senegal | 1–0 | 1–3 | Friendly | |
| 74 | 109 | 9 September 2025 | Red Star Stadium, Belgrade, Serbia | Serbia | 1–0 | 5–0 | 2026 FIFA World Cup qualification | |
| 75 | 110 | 14 October 2025 | Daugava Stadium, Riga, Latvia | Latvia | 2–0 | 5–0 | 2026 FIFA World Cup qualification | |
| 76 | 110 | 14 October 2025 | Daugava Stadium, Riga, Latvia | Latvia | 3–0‡ | 5–0 | 2026 FIFA World Cup qualification | |
| 77 | 112 | 16 November 2025 | Arena Kombëtare, Tirana, Albania | Albania | 1–0 | 2–0 | 2026 FIFA World Cup qualification | |
| 78 | 112 | 16 November 2025 | Arena Kombëtare, Tirana, Albania | Albania | 2–0 | 2–0 | 2026 FIFA World Cup qualification | |
| 79 | 113 | 6 June 2026 | Raymond James Stadium, Tampa, United States | New Zealand | 1–0 | 1–0 | Friendly | |
| 80 | 115 | 17 June 2026 | AT&T Stadium, Arlington, United States | Croatia | 1–0‡ | 4–2 | 2026 FIFA World Cup | |
| 81 | 115 | 17 June 2026 | AT&T Stadium, Arlington, United States | Croatia | 2–1 | 4–2 | 2026 FIFA World Cup | |
| 82 | 117 | 27 June 2026 | MetLife Stadium, East Rutherford, United States | Panama | 2–0 | 2–0 | 2026 FIFA World Cup | |
| 83 | 118 | 1 July 2026 | Mercedes-Benz Stadium, Atlanta, United States | DR Congo | 1–1 | 2–1 | 2026 FIFA World Cup | |
| 84 | 118 | 1 July 2026 | Mercedes-Benz Stadium, Atlanta, United States | DR Congo | 2–1 | 2–1 | 2026 FIFA World Cup | |
| 85 | 119 | 5 July 2026 | Estadio Azteca, Mexico City, Mexico | Mexico | 3–1‡ | 3–2 | 2026 FIFA World Cup | |
| 86 | 122 | 26 September 2026 | Wembley Stadium, London, England | Spain | 2–1 | 2–3 | 2026–27 UEFA Nations League A | |
| 87 | 123 | 29 September 2026 | Fortuna Arena, Prague, Czech Republic | Czech Republic | 2–0 | 2–0 | 2026–27 UEFA Nations League A | |
| 88 | 124 | 3 October 2026 | Stadion Rujevica, Rijeka, Croatia | Croatia | 1–0 | 7–0 | 2026–27 UEFA Nations League A | |
| 89 | 124 | 3 October 2026 | Stadion Rujevica, Rijeka, Croatia | Croatia | 5–0 | 7–0 | 2026–27 UEFA Nations League A | |
| 90 | 125 | 6 October 2026 | Wembley Stadium, London, England | Czech Republic | 2–0 | 3–0 | 2026–27 UEFA Nations League A | |
| 91 | 125 | 6 October 2026 | Wembley Stadium, London, England | Czech Republic | 3–0 | 3–0 | 2026–27 UEFA Nations League A | |
| 92 | 126 | 12 November 2026 | Wembley Stadium, London, England | Croatia | 2–1‡ | 2–1 | 2026–27 UEFA Nations League A | |
| 93 | 127 | 15 November 2026 | Riyadh Air Metropolitano Stadium, Madrid, Spain | Spain | 1–0‡ | 3–2 | 2026–27 UEFA Nations League A | |

== Hat-tricks ==
As of match played 15 November 2026

List of international hat-tricks scored by Harry Kane
| No. | Date | Venue | Opponent | Goals | Result | Competition | Ref. |
|---|---|---|---|---|---|---|---|
| 1 | 24 June 2018 | Nizhny Novgorod Stadium, Nizhny Novgorod, Russia | Panama | 3 (22' pen., 45+1' pen., 62') | 6–1 | 2018 FIFA World Cup | |
| 2 | 7 September 2019 | Wembley Stadium, London, England | Bulgaria | 3 (24', 49' pen., 73' pen.) | 4–0 | UEFA Euro 2020 qualifying | |
| 3 | 14 November 2019 | Wembley Stadium, London, England | Montenegro | 3 (18', 24', 37') | 7–0 | UEFA Euro 2020 qualifying | |
| 4 | 12 November 2021 | Wembley Stadium, London, England | Albania | 3 (18', 33', 45+1') | 5–0 | 2022 FIFA World Cup qualification | |
| 5 | 15 November 2021 | San Marino Stadium, Serravalle, San Marino | San Marino | 4 (27' pen., 31', 39' pen., 42') | 10–0 | 2022 FIFA World Cup qualification | |

== Statistics ==
As of match played 15 November 2026

Appearances and goals by year
| Year | Apps | Goals |
|---|---|---|
| 2015 | 8 | 3 |
| 2016 | 9 | 2 |
| 2017 | 6 | 7 |
| 2018 | 12 | 8 |
| 2019 | 10 | 12 |
| 2020 | 6 | 0 |
| 2021 | 16 | 16 |
| 2022 | 13 | 5 |
| 2023 | 9 | 9 |
| 2024 | 14 | 7 |
| 2025 | 9 | 9 |
| 2026 | 15 | 15 |
| Total | 127 | 93 |

Appearances and goals by competition
| Competition | Apps | Goals |
|---|---|---|
| FIFA World Cup | 18 | 14 |
| FIFA World Cup qualification | 22 | 25 |
| UEFA European Championship | 18 | 7 |
| UEFA European Championship qualifying | 21 | 23 |
| UEFA Nations League | 29 | 14 |
| Friendlies | 19 | 10 |
| Total | 127 | 93 |

Goals by opponent
| Opponent | Goals |
|---|---|
| Albania | 7 |
| Croatia | 6 |
| Czech Republic | 5 |
| San Marino | 5 |
| Bulgaria | 4 |
| Germany | 4 |
| Malta | 4 |
| Montenegro | 4 |
| Panama | 4 |
| France | 3 |
| Italy | 3 |
| Latvia | 3 |
| Ukraine | 3 |
| Andorra | 2 |
| Denmark | 2 |
| DR Congo | 2 |
| Finland | 2 |
| Kosovo | 2 |
| Lithuania | 2 |
| North Macedonia | 2 |
| Poland | 2 |
| Scotland | 2 |
| Senegal | 2 |
| Spain | 2 |
| Switzerland | 2 |
| Tunisia | 2 |
| Bosnia and Herzegovina | 1 |
| Colombia | 1 |
| Hungary | 1 |
| Mexico | 1 |
| Netherlands | 1 |
| New Zealand | 1 |
| Nigeria | 1 |
| Republic of Ireland | 1 |
| Serbia | 1 |
| Slovakia | 1 |
| Slovenia | 1 |
| Turkey | 1 |
| Total | 93 |

Appearances and goals by Manager
| Manager | Years | Apps | Goals |
|---|---|---|---|
| (England) Roy Hodgson | 2015 - 2016 | 16 | 5 |
| (England) Sam Allardyce | 2016 | 1 | 0 |
| (England) Gareth Southgate | 2016 - 2024 | 81 | 61 |
| (Republic of Ireland) Lee Carsley | 2024 | 5 | 3 |
| (Germany) Thomas Tuchel | 2025 - Present | 24 | 24 |
| Total | | 127 | 93 |

Appearances and goals by Club
| Club | Years | Apps | Goals |
|---|---|---|---|
| (England) Tottenham Hotspur | 2015 - 2023 | 84 | 58 |
| (Germany) Bayern Munich | 2023 - Present | 43 | 35 |
| Total | | 127 | 93 |

== See also ==
- List of top international men's football goalscorers by country
- List of men's footballers with 50 or more international goals
