= List of international goals scored by Iswadi Idris =

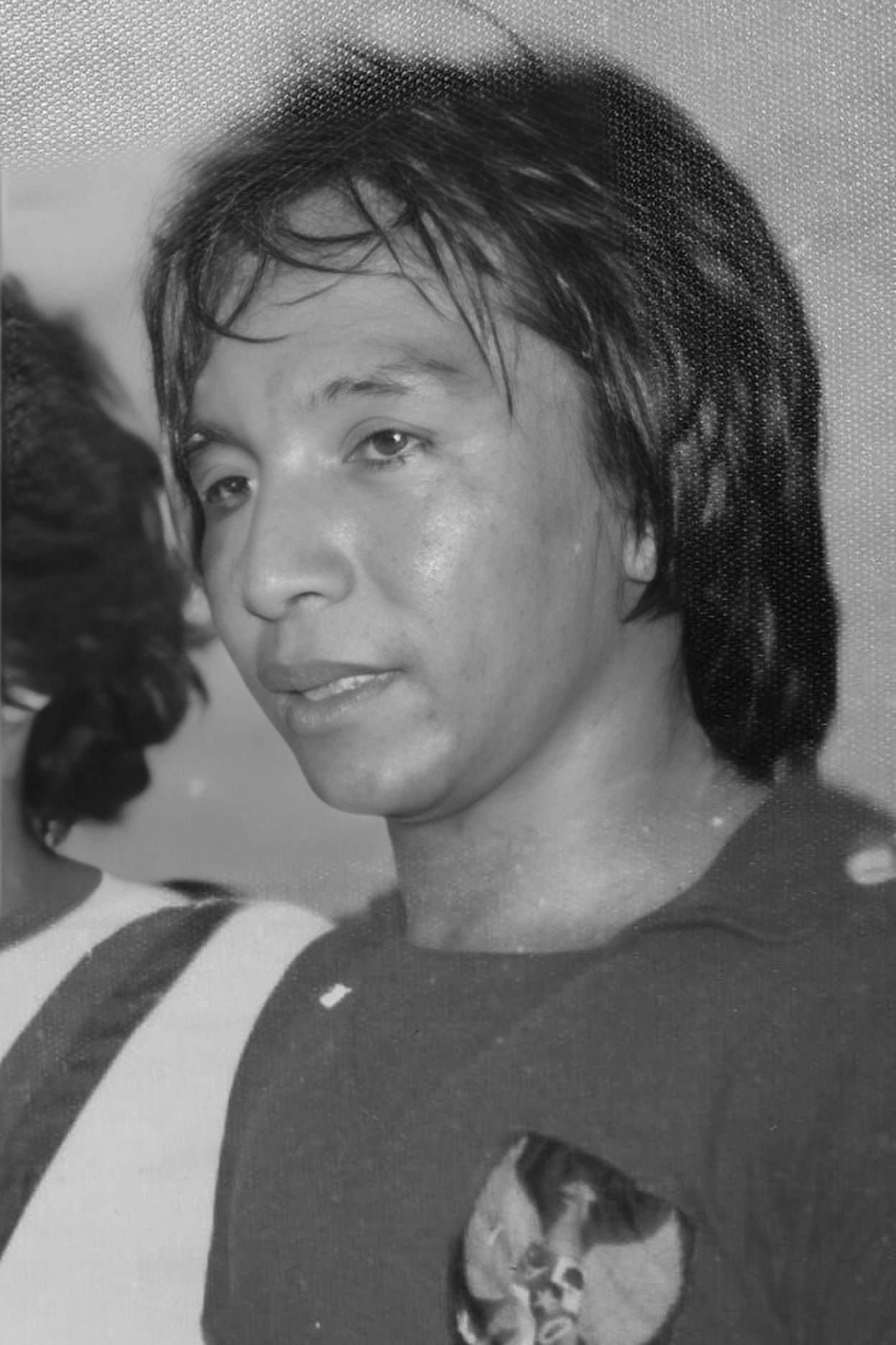
Idris has scored 55 international goals since making his debut for Indonesia in 1968

Iswadi Idris was a footballer who represented the Indonesia national football team as a winger between 1968 and 1980. He scored his first international goal in his debut during a Merdeka Tournament (friendly tournament) match against Singapore on 15 August 1968. He retired from international football in April 1980, with a record of 55 goals in 97 international appearances, making him Indonesia's second highest scorer behind Abdul Kadir.

Idris scored his first international hat-trick on 19 August 1968 in a 10–1 win over Taiwan during a 1968 Merdeka Tournament match. In total, he has scored four hat-tricks (including 5 goals against South Vietnam in 1971), and has scored two goals in a match nine times. His five goals against South Vietnam in 1971 President's Cup also made him Indonesia's only player to ever score a glut.

== Goals ==
As of 3 April 1980
Indonesia score listed first, score column indicates score after each Idris goal.

Table key
Indicates Indonesia won the match
Indicates the match ended in a draw
Indicates Indonesia lost the match

International goals by cap, date, venue, opponent, result and competition
No.	Cap	Date	Venue	Opponent	Result	Competition
1	1	15 August 1968	Merdeka Stadium, Kuala Lumpur, Malaysia	Singapore	4–0	1968 Merdeka Tournament
2	2	17 August 1968	Perak Stadium, Ipoh, Malaysia	South Korea	4–2	1968 Merdeka Tournament
3	2	17 August 1968	Perak Stadium, Ipoh, Malaysia	South Korea	4–2	1968 Merdeka Tournament
4	3	19 August 1968	Merdeka Stadium, Kuala Lumpur, Malaysia	Taiwan	10–1	1968 Merdeka Tournament
5	3	19 August 1968	Merdeka Stadium, Kuala Lumpur, Malaysia	Taiwan	10–1	1968 Merdeka Tournament
6	3	19 August 1968	Merdeka Stadium, Kuala Lumpur, Malaysia	Taiwan	10–1	1968 Merdeka Tournament
7	7	27 November 1968	Suphachalasai Stadium, Bangkok, Thailand	Singapore	7–0	1968 King's Cup
8	7	27 November 1968	Suphachalasai Stadium, Bangkok, Thailand	Singapore	7–0	1968 King's Cup
9	10	1 November 1969	Perak Stadium, Ipoh, Malaysia	Thailand	4–0	1969 Merdeka Tournament
10	10	1 November 1969	Perak Stadium, Ipoh, Malaysia	Thailand	4–0	1969 Merdeka Tournament
11	10	1 November 1969	Perak Stadium, Ipoh, Malaysia	Thailand	4–0	1969 Merdeka Tournament
12	12	7 November 1969	Merdeka Stadium, Kuala Lumpur, Malaysia	Singapore	9–2	1969 Merdeka Tournament
13	12	7 November 1969	Merdeka Stadium, Kuala Lumpur, Malaysia	Singapore	9–2	1969 Merdeka Tournament
14	13	9 November 1969	Merdeka Stadium, Kuala Lumpur, Malaysia	Malaysia	3–2	1969 Merdeka Tournament
15	16	27 November 1969	Suphachalasai Stadium, Bangkok, Thailand	Laos	3–0	1969 King's Cup
16	19	4 August 1970	Penang Island National Stadium, Penang, Malaysia	Hong Kong	3–1	1970 Merdeka Tournament
17	21	8 August 1970	Merdeka Stadium, Kuala Lumpur, Malaysia	Japan	3–4	1970 Merdeka Tournament
18	22	10 August 1970	Merdeka Stadium, Kuala Lumpur, Malaysia	Thailand	6–3	1970 Merdeka Tournament
19	22	10 August 1970	Merdeka Stadium, Kuala Lumpur, Malaysia	Thailand	6–3	1970 Merdeka Tournament
20	25	13 November 1970	Suphachalasai Stadium, Bangkok, Thailand	Malaysia	3–1	1970 King's Cup
21	26	15 November 1970	Suphachalasai Stadium, Bangkok, Thailand	Khmer Republic	4–2	1970 King's Cup
22	28	20 November 1970	Suphachalasai Stadium, Bangkok, Thailand	Malaysia	1–3	1970 King's Cup
23	29	10 December 1970	Suphachalasai Stadium, Bangkok, Thailand	Iran	2–2	1970 Asian Games
24	34	2 May 1971	Dongdaemun Stadium, Seoul, South Korea	South Vietnam	9–1	1971 President's Cup
25	34	2 May 1971	Dongdaemun Stadium, Seoul, South Korea	South Vietnam	9–1	1971 President's Cup
26	34	2 May 1971	Dongdaemun Stadium, Seoul, South Korea	South Vietnam	9–1	1971 President's Cup
27	34	2 May 1971	Dongdaemun Stadium, Seoul, South Korea	South Vietnam	9–1	1971 President's Cup
28	34	2 May 1971	Dongdaemun Stadium, Seoul, South Korea	South Vietnam	9–1	1971 President's Cup
29	38	13 May 1971	Dongdaemun Stadium, Seoul, South Korea	Malaysia	4–2	1971 President's Cup
30	38	13 May 1971	Dongdaemun Stadium, Seoul, South Korea	Malaysia	4–2	1971 President's Cup
31	39	5 June 1971	Gelora Senayan Main Stadium, Jakarta, Indonesia	Singapore	3–0	1971 Jakarta Anniversary Tournament
32	39	5 June 1971	Gelora Senayan Main Stadium, Jakarta, Indonesia	Singapore	3–0	1971 Jakarta Anniversary Tournament
33	43	15 June 1971	Gelora Senayan Main Stadium, Jakarta, Indonesia	Malaysia	2–1	1971 Jakarta Anniversary Tournament
34	45	20 March 1972	Bogyoke Aung San Stadium, Rangoon, Burma	Thailand	4–0	1972 Olympic Games qualification
35	50	5 June 1972	Gelora Senayan Main Stadium, Jakarta, Indonesia	Laos	5–1	1972 Jakarta Anniversary Tournament
36	50	5 June 1972	Gelora Senayan Main Stadium, Jakarta, Indonesia	Laos	5–1	1972 Jakarta Anniversary Tournament
37	53	17 June 1972	Gelora Senayan Main Stadium, Jakarta, Indonesia	Khmer Republic	4–0	1972 Jakarta Anniversary Tournament
38	57	21 September 1972	Dongdaemun Stadium, Seoul, South Korea	Singapore	2–1	1972 President's Cup
39	57	21 September 1972	Dongdaemun Stadium, Seoul, South Korea	Singapore	2–1	1972 President's Cup
40	58	23 September 1972	Dongdaemun Stadium, Seoul, South Korea	Burma	1–1	1972 President's Cup
41	59	25 September 1972	Dongdaemun Stadium, Seoul, South Korea	Philippines	12–0	1972 President's Cup
42	59	25 September 1972	Dongdaemun Stadium, Seoul, South Korea	Philippines	12–0	1972 President's Cup
43	59	25 September 1972	Dongdaemun Stadium, Seoul, South Korea	Philippines	12–0	1972 President's Cup
44	66	13 March 1973	Sydney Sports Ground, Sydney, Australia	Australia	1–2	1974 FIFA World Cup qualification
45	67	16 March 1973	Sydney Sports Ground, Sydney, Australia	Iraq	1–1	1974 FIFA World Cup qualification
46	70	14 June 1973	Gelora Senayan Main Stadium, Jakarta, Indonesia	Malaysia	2–0	1973 Jakarta Anniversary Tournament
47	75	17 February 1976	Gelora Senayan Main Stadium, Jakarta, Indonesia	Papua New Guinea	8–2	1976 Olympic Games qualification
48	77	24 February 1976	Gelora Senayan Main Stadium, Jakarta, Indonesia	Malaysia	2–1	1976 Olympic Games qualification
49	81	9 March 1977	National Stadium, Singapore	Singapore	4–0	1978 FIFA World Cup qualification
50	82	19 November 1977	Merdeka Stadium, Kuala Lumpur, Malaysia	Malaysia	2–1	1977 Southeast Asian Games
51	83	22 November 1977	Merdeka Stadium, Kuala Lumpur, Malaysia	Brunei	4–0	1977 Southeast Asian Games
52	83	22 November 1977	Merdeka Stadium, Kuala Lumpur, Malaysia	Brunei	4–0	1977 Southeast Asian Games
53	86	5 May 1979	Suphachalasai Stadium, Bangkok, Thailand	Malaysia	1–4	1980 AFC Asian Cup qualification
54	88	22 September 1979	Gelora Senayan Main Stadium, Jakarta, Indonesia	Singapore	3–0	1979 Southeast Asian Games
55	91	28 September 1979	Gelora Senayan Main Stadium, Jakarta, Indonesia	Burma	2–1	1979 Southeast Asian Games

== Hat-tricks ==
Table key
Indicates Indonesia won the match
Indicates the match ended in a draw
Indicates Indonesia lost the match

No.	Date	Venue	Opponent	Goals	Result	Competition
1	19 August 1968	Merdeka Stadium, Kuala Lumpur, Malaysia	Taiwan	3 – (15', 60', 85')	9–2	1968 Merdeka Tournament
2	1 November 1969	Perak Stadium, Ipoh, Malaysia	Thailand	3 – (44', 63', 84')	4–3	1969 Merdeka Tournament
3	2 May 1971	Dongdaemun Stadium, Seoul, South Korea	South Vietnam	5 – (10', 13', 63', 84', 90')	9–1	1971 President's Cup
4	25 September 1972	Dongdaemun Stadium, Seoul, South Korea	Philippines	3 – (44', 63', 84')	12–0	1972 President's Cup

== Statistics ==
Goals by year
National team	Year	Apps	Goals
Indonesia	1968	9	8
Indonesia	1969	8	7
Indonesia	1970	16	8
Indonesia	1971	11	10
Indonesia	1972	19	10
Indonesia	1973	10	3
Indonesia	1976	5	2
Indonesia	1977	6	4
Indonesia	1979	8	3
Indonesia	1980	5	0
Total		97	55

Goals by competition
Competition	Goals
Merdeka Tournament	16
President's Cup	13
Jakarta Anniversary Tournament	7
King's Cup	6
Southeast Asian Games	5
FIFA World Cup qualification	3
Summer Olympics qualifiers	3
Asian Games	1
Asian Games qualification	1
Total	55

Goals by opponent
Opponent	Goals
Singapore	11
Malaysia	10
Thailand	6
South Vietnam	5
Laos	3
Philippines	3
Taiwan	3
Brunei	2
Burma	2
Khmer Republic	2
South Korea	1
Australia	1
Hong Kong	1
Iran	1
Iraq	1
Japan	1
Papua New Guinea	1
Total	55

== See also ==
- List of top international men's football goalscorers by country
- List of men's footballers with 50 or more international goals
