= List of international goals scored by Romelu Lukaku =

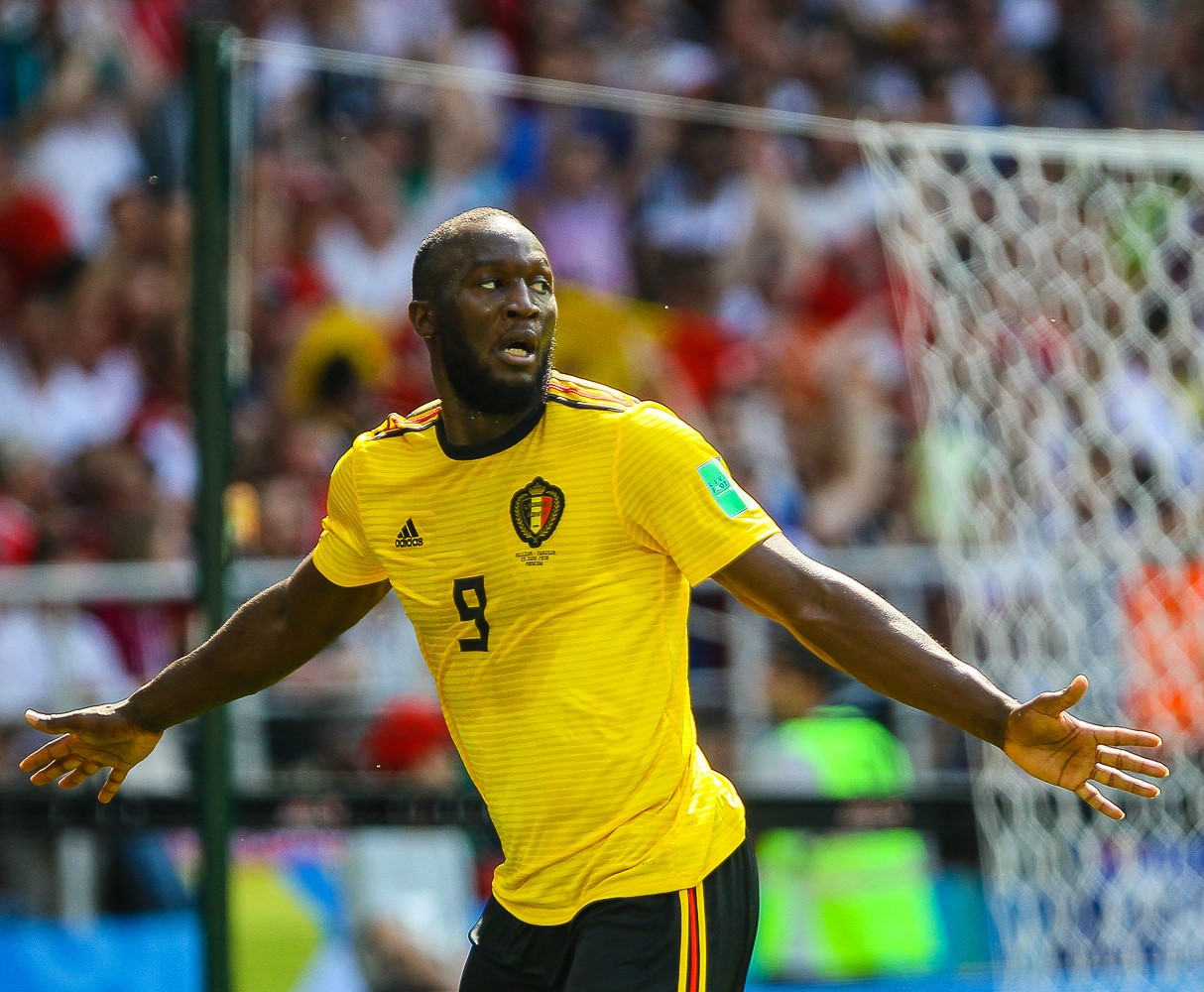
Lukaku celebrating his first goal against Tunisia at the 2018 FIFA World Cup. He scored 94 goals for Belgium between 2010 and 2026.

Romelu Lukaku is a Belgian professional footballer who represented the Belgium national team as a striker. In March 2010, he made his debut for his country in a 1–0 defeat to Croatia in Brussels at the age of 17. His first and second international goals came during his eighth appearance for Belgium, scoring both in a 2–0 friendly victory over Russia. He announced his international retirement in November 2026.

With 94 goals in 135 appearances, Lukaku is currently his country's all-time top scorer, and also ranks as the second-highest European men's international goalscorer, behind only Portugal's Cristiano Ronaldo. The Belgian Football Association confirmed that Lukaku had broken the national record when he scored his 31st international goal in a match against Japan in November 2017. FIFA, however, did not initially recognise the record, as the May 2014 match against Luxembourg in which he had scored three goals was later declared by the organisation as an unofficial friendly due to too many substitutions being made.

Lukaku scored twice against Tunisia in the group stage of the 2018 FIFA World Cup, a match after which football journalist Nick Ames praised him for a "laudable act of sportsmanship", as he had indicated to the referee that he had not been fouled in the penalty area, denying himself the chance of a hat-trick. The two goals took his overall tally in the 2018 World Cup to four and made him Belgium's highest scorer in a single World Cup tournament, also becoming the first player since Diego Maradona in 1986 to score back-to-back World Cup braces (two goals in a single game). Lukaku's goal against New Zealand at the 2026 World Cup took his career tally in the competition to six, overtaking Marc Wilmots as Belgium's record World Cup scorer.

Lukaku scored four hat-tricks during his international career, including the treble against Luxembourg, with the others coming in a 9–0 win against Gibraltar in a 2018 World Cup qualifier in August 2017, a 3–0 victory against Sweden in a Euro 2024 qualifier in March 2023, and four goals in a 5–0 win over Azerbaijan in November 2023, also a Euro 2024 qualifier. Out of all his opponents, he scored the most against Estonia, with eight goals against the side. Lukaku scored more goals in friendlies than in any other format, with 26. He scored 19 goals in qualifying for the FIFA World Cup, eight in FIFA World Cup finals, 21 in qualifying for the UEFA European Championship, six in the European Championship finals and 14 in the UEFA Nations League. Lukaku scored his 94th and final goal in a 3–0 Nations League win against Turkey in October 2026.

== International goals ==
Scores and results list Belgium's goal tally first, score column indicates score after each Lukaku goal.

Key
‡	Indicates match was not officially recognised by FIFA
	Indicates Belgium won the match
	Indicates the match ended in a draw
	Indicates Belgium lost the match

International goals by date, venue, cap, opponent, score, result and competition
No.	Cap	Date	Venue	Opponent	Score	Result	Competition	Ref.
1	8	17 November 2010	Tsentralnyi Profsoyuz Stadion, Voronezh, Russia	Russia	1–0	2–0	Friendly	
2	8	17 November 2010	Tsentralnyi Profsoyuz Stadion, Voronezh, Russia	Russia	2–0	2–0	Friendly	
3	16	15 August 2012	King Baudouin Stadium, Brussels, Belgium	Netherlands	3–2	4–2	Friendly	
4	23	11 October 2013	Stadion Maksimir, Zagreb, Croatia	Croatia	1–0	2–1	2014 FIFA World Cup qualification	
5	23	11 October 2013	Stadion Maksimir, Zagreb, Croatia	Croatia	2–0	2–1	2014 FIFA World Cup qualification	
6	28	26 May 2014	Cristal Arena, Genk, Belgium	Luxembourg	1–0	5–1‡	Friendly	
7	28	26 May 2014	Cristal Arena, Genk, Belgium	Luxembourg	3–1	5–1‡	Friendly	
8	28	26 May 2014	Cristal Arena, Genk, Belgium	Luxembourg	4–1	5–1‡	Friendly	
9	29	1 June 2014	Friends Arena, Solna, Sweden	Sweden	1–0	2–0	Friendly	
10	33	1 July 2014	Arena Fonte Nova, Salvador, Brazil	United States	2–0	2–1 (a.e.t.)	2014 FIFA World Cup	
11	37	12 November 2014	King Baudouin Stadium, Brussels, Belgium	Iceland	3–1	3–1	Friendly	
12	43	29 March 2016	Estádio Dr. Magalhães Pessoa, Leiria, Portugal	Portugal	1–2	1–2	Friendly	
13	44	28 May 2016	Stade de Genève, Geneva, Switzerland	Switzerland	1–1	2–1	Friendly	
14	45	1 June 2016	King Baudouin Stadium, Brussels, Belgium	Finland	1–1	1–1	Friendly	
15	46	5 June 2016	King Baudouin Stadium, Brussels, Belgium	Norway	1–0	3–2	Friendly	
16	48	18 June 2016	Stade Atlantique, Bordeaux, France	Republic of Ireland	1–0	3–0	UEFA Euro 2016	
17	48	18 June 2016	Stade Atlantique, Bordeaux, France	Republic of Ireland	3–0	3–0	UEFA Euro 2016	
18	53	6 September 2016	GSP Stadium, Nicosia, Cyprus	Cyprus	1–0	3–0	2018 FIFA World Cup qualification	
19	53	6 September 2016	GSP Stadium, Nicosia, Cyprus	Cyprus	2–0	3–0	2018 FIFA World Cup qualification	
20	54	7 October 2016	King Baudouin Stadium, Brussels, Belgium	Bosnia and Herzegovina	4–0	4–0	2018 FIFA World Cup qualification	
21	56	13 November 2016	King Baudouin Stadium, Brussels, Belgium	Estonia	7–1	8–1	2018 FIFA World Cup qualification	
22	56	13 November 2016	King Baudouin Stadium, Brussels, Belgium	Estonia	8–1	8–1	2018 FIFA World Cup qualification	
23	57	25 March 2017	King Baudouin Stadium, Brussels, Belgium	Greece	1–1	1–1	2018 FIFA World Cup qualification	
24	61	31 August 2017	Stade Maurice Dufrasne, Liège, Belgium	Gibraltar	3–0	9–0	2018 FIFA World Cup qualification	
25	61	31 August 2017	Stade Maurice Dufrasne, Liège, Belgium	Gibraltar	5–0	9–0	2018 FIFA World Cup qualification	
26	61	31 August 2017	Stade Maurice Dufrasne, Liège, Belgium	Gibraltar	9–0	9–0	2018 FIFA World Cup qualification	
27	62	3 September 2017	Karaiskakis Stadium, Athens, Greece	Greece	2–1	2–1	2018 FIFA World Cup qualification	
28	63	10 October 2017	King Baudouin Stadium, Brussels, Belgium	Cyprus	4–0	4–0	2018 FIFA World Cup qualification	
29	64	10 November 2017	King Baudouin Stadium, Brussels, Belgium	Mexico	2–1	3–3	Friendly	
30	64	10 November 2017	King Baudouin Stadium, Brussels, Belgium	Mexico	3–3	3–3	Friendly	
31	65	14 November 2017	Jan Breydel Stadium, Bruges, Belgium	Japan	1–0	1–0	Friendly	
32	66	27 March 2018	King Baudouin Stadium, Brussels, Belgium	Saudi Arabia	1–0	4–0	Friendly	
33	66	27 March 2018	King Baudouin Stadium, Brussels, Belgium	Saudi Arabia	2–0	4–0	Friendly	
34	68	6 June 2018	King Baudouin Stadium, Brussels, Belgium	Egypt	1–0	3–0	Friendly	
35	69	11 June 2018	King Baudouin Stadium, Brussels, Belgium	Costa Rica	2–1	4–1	Friendly	
36	69	11 June 2018	King Baudouin Stadium, Brussels, Belgium	Costa Rica	3–1	4–1	Friendly	
37	70	18 June 2018	Fisht Olympic Stadium, Sochi, Russia	Panama	2–0	3–0	2018 FIFA World Cup	
38	70	18 June 2018	Fisht Olympic Stadium, Sochi, Russia	Panama	3–0	3–0	2018 FIFA World Cup	
39	71	23 June 2018	Otkritie Arena, Moscow, Russia	Tunisia	2–0	5–2	2018 FIFA World Cup	
40	71	23 June 2018	Otkritie Arena, Moscow, Russia	Tunisia	3–1	5–2	2018 FIFA World Cup	
41	76	7 September 2018	Hampden Park, Glasgow, Scotland	Scotland	1–0	4–0	Friendly	
42	77	11 September 2018	Laugardalsvöllur, Reykjavík, Iceland	Iceland	2–0	3–0	2018–19 UEFA Nations League A	
43	77	11 September 2018	Laugardalsvöllur, Reykjavík, Iceland	Iceland	3–0	3–0	2018–19 UEFA Nations League A	
44	78	12 October 2018	King Baudouin Stadium, Brussels, Belgium	Switzerland	1–0	2–1	2018–19 UEFA Nations League A	
45	78	12 October 2018	King Baudouin Stadium, Brussels, Belgium	Switzerland	2–1	2–1	2018–19 UEFA Nations League A	
46	80	8 June 2019	King Baudouin Stadium, Brussels, Belgium	Kazakhstan	3–0	3–0	UEFA Euro 2020 qualifying	
47	81	11 June 2019	King Baudouin Stadium, Brussels, Belgium	Scotland	1–0	3–0	UEFA Euro 2020 qualifying	
48	81	11 June 2019	King Baudouin Stadium, Brussels, Belgium	Scotland	2–0	3–0	UEFA Euro 2020 qualifying	
49	82	9 September 2019	Hampden Park, Glasgow, Scotland	Scotland	1–0	4–0	UEFA Euro 2020 qualifying	
50	83	10 October 2019	King Baudouin Stadium, Brussels, Belgium	San Marino	1–0	9–0	UEFA Euro 2020 qualifying	
51	83	10 October 2019	King Baudouin Stadium, Brussels, Belgium	San Marino	4–0	9–0	UEFA Euro 2020 qualifying	
52	84	16 November 2019	Krestovsky Stadium, Saint Petersburg, Russia	Russia	4–0	4–1	UEFA Euro 2020 qualifying	
53	86	11 October 2020	Wembley Stadium, London, England	England	1–0	1–2	2020–21 UEFA Nations League A	
54	87	14 October 2020	Laugardalsvöllur, Reykjavík, Iceland	Iceland	1–0	2–1	2020–21 UEFA Nations League A	
55	87	14 October 2020	Laugardalsvöllur, Reykjavík, Iceland	Iceland	2–1	2–1	2020–21 UEFA Nations League A	
56	89	18 November 2020	Den Dreef, Leuven, Belgium	Denmark	2–1	4–2	2020–21 UEFA Nations League A	
57	89	18 November 2020	Den Dreef, Leuven, Belgium	Denmark	3–1	4–2	2020–21 UEFA Nations League A	
58	90	24 March 2021	Den Dreef, Leuven, Belgium	Wales	3–1	3–1	2022 FIFA World Cup qualification	
59	91	27 March 2021	Sinobo Stadium, Prague, Czech Republic	Czech Republic	1–1	1–1	2022 FIFA World Cup qualification	
60	93	6 June 2021	King Baudouin Stadium, Brussels, Belgium	Croatia	1–0	1–0	Friendly	
61	94	12 June 2021	Krestovsky Stadium, Saint Petersburg, Russia	Russia	1–0	3–0	UEFA Euro 2020	
62	94	12 June 2021	Krestovsky Stadium, Saint Petersburg, Russia	Russia	3–0	3–0	UEFA Euro 2020	
63	96	21 June 2021	Krestovsky Stadium, Saint Petersburg, Russia	Finland	2–0	2–0	UEFA Euro 2020	
64	98	2 July 2021	Allianz Arena, Munich, Germany	Italy	1–2	1–2	UEFA Euro 2020	
65	99	2 September 2021	Lilleküla Stadium, Tallinn, Estonia	Estonia	2–1	5–2	2022 FIFA World Cup qualification	
66	99	2 September 2021	Lilleküla Stadium, Tallinn, Estonia	Estonia	3–1	5–2	2022 FIFA World Cup qualification	
67	100	5 September 2021	King Baudouin Stadium, Brussels, Belgium	Czech Republic	1–0	3–0	2022 FIFA World Cup qualification	
68	101	7 October 2021	Juventus Stadium, Turin, Italy	France	2–0	2–3	2021 UEFA Nations League Finals	
69	105	24 March 2023	Friends Arena, Solna, Sweden	Sweden	1–0	3–0	UEFA Euro 2024 qualifying	
70	105	24 March 2023	Friends Arena, Solna, Sweden	Sweden	2–0	3–0	UEFA Euro 2024 qualifying	
71	105	24 March 2023	Friends Arena, Solna, Sweden	Sweden	3–0	3–0	UEFA Euro 2024 qualifying	
72	106	28 March 2023	RheinEnergieStadion, Cologne, Germany	Germany	2–0	3–2	Friendly	
73	107	17 June 2023	King Baudouin Stadium, Brussels, Belgium	Austria	1–1	1–1	UEFA Euro 2024 qualifying	
74	108	20 June 2023	Lilleküla Stadium, Tallinn, Estonia	Estonia	1–0	3–0	UEFA Euro 2024 qualifying	
75	108	20 June 2023	Lilleküla Stadium, Tallinn, Estonia	Estonia	2–0	3–0	UEFA Euro 2024 qualifying	
76	110	12 September 2023	King Baudouin Stadium, Brussels, Belgium	Estonia	3–0	5–0	UEFA Euro 2024 qualifying	
77	110	12 September 2023	King Baudouin Stadium, Brussels, Belgium	Estonia	4–0	5–0	UEFA Euro 2024 qualifying	
78	111	13 October 2023	Ernst-Happel-Stadion, Vienna, Austria	Austria	3–0	3–2	UEFA Euro 2024 qualifying	
79	112	16 October 2023	King Baudouin Stadium, Brussels, Belgium	Sweden	1–1	1–1 (Note: Belgium's Euro 2024 qualifying match at home to Sweden was abandoned at half-time with the score 1–1 due to security reasons, after two Swedish supporters were killed in a terrorist shooting in Brussels. On 19 October 2023, UEFA decided that the half-time score would be considered final and the match would not be resumed.)	UEFA Euro 2024 qualifying	
80	113	19 November 2023	King Baudouin Stadium, Brussels, Belgium	Azerbaijan	1–0	5–0	UEFA Euro 2024 qualifying	
81	113	19 November 2023	King Baudouin Stadium, Brussels, Belgium	Azerbaijan	2–0	5–0	UEFA Euro 2024 qualifying	
82	113	19 November 2023	King Baudouin Stadium, Brussels, Belgium	Azerbaijan	3–0	5–0	UEFA Euro 2024 qualifying	
83	113	19 November 2023	King Baudouin Stadium, Brussels, Belgium	Azerbaijan	4–0	5–0	UEFA Euro 2024 qualifying	
84	115	8 June 2024	King Baudouin Stadium, Brussels, Belgium	Luxembourg	1–0	3–0	Friendly	
85	115	8 June 2024	King Baudouin Stadium, Brussels, Belgium	Luxembourg	2–0	3–0	Friendly	
86	121	20 March 2025	Nueva Condomina, Murcia, Spain	Ukraine	1–0	1–3	2024–25 UEFA Nations League promotion/relegation play-offs	
87	122	23 March 2025	Cegeka Arena, Genk, Belgium	Ukraine	2–0	3–0	2024–25 UEFA Nations League promotion/relegation play-offs	
88	122	23 March 2025	Cegeka Arena, Genk, Belgium	Ukraine	3–0	3–0	2024–25 UEFA Nations League promotion/relegation play-offs	
89	124	9 June 2025	King Baudouin Stadium, Brussels, Belgium	Wales	1–0	4–3	2026 FIFA World Cup qualification	
90	125	2 June 2026	Stadion Rujevica, Rijeka, Croatia	Croatia	2–0	2–0	Friendly	
91	129	26 June 2026	BC Place, Vancouver, Canada	New Zealand	4–1	5–1	2026 FIFA World Cup	
92	130	1 July 2026	Lumen Field, Seattle, United States	Senegal	1–2	3–2 (a.e.t.)	2026 FIFA World Cup	
93	131	6 July 2026	Lumen Field, Seattle, United States	United States	4–1	4–1	2026 FIFA World Cup	
94	134	2 October 2026	Stade Maurice Dufrasne, Liège, Belgium	Turkey	3–0	3–0	2026–27 UEFA Nations League A	

== Hat-tricks ==
No.	Opponent	Goals	Result	Venue	Competition	Date
1	Luxembourg	3 – (1–0', 3–1', 4–1')	5–1	Cristal Arena, Genk, Belgium	Friendly	26 May 2014
2	Gibraltar	3 – (3–0', 5–0', 9–0')	9–0	Stade Maurice Dufrasne, Liège, Belgium	2018 FIFA World Cup qualification	31 August 2017
3	Sweden	3 – (1–0', 2–0', 3–0')	3–0	Friends Arena, Solna, Sweden	UEFA Euro 2024 qualifying	24 March 2023
4	Azerbaijan	4 – (1–0', 2–0', 3–0', 4–0')	5–0	King Baudouin Stadium, Brussels, Belgium	UEFA Euro 2024 qualifying	19 November 2023

== Statistics ==
Appearances and goals by year
Year	Apps	Goals
2010	8	2
2011	5	0
2012	5	1
2013	8	2
2014	11	6
2015	5	0
2016	14	11
2017	9	9
2018	14	14
2019	5	7
2020	5	5
2021	12	11
2022	3	0
2023	9	15
2024	7	2
2025	4	4
2026	11	5
Total	135	94

Appearances and goals by competition
Competition	Apps	Goals
Friendlies	46	26
FIFA World Cup qualifiers	18	19
FIFA World Cup finals	18	8
UEFA European Championship qualifiers	24	21
UEFA European Championship finals	14	6
UEFA Nations League	15	14
Total	135	94

Goals by opponent
Opponent	Goals
Estonia	8
Iceland	5
Luxembourg	5
Russia	5
Sweden	5
Azerbaijan	4
Croatia	4
Scotland	4
Cyprus	3
Gibraltar	3
Switzerland	3
Ukraine	3
Austria	2
Costa Rica	2
Czech Republic	2
Denmark	2
Finland	2
Greece	2
Mexico	2
Panama	2
Republic of Ireland	2
San Marino	2
Saudi Arabia	2
Tunisia	2
United States	2
Wales	2
Bosnia and Herzegovina	1
Egypt	1
England	1
France	1
Germany	1
Italy	1
Japan	1
Kazakhstan	1
Netherlands	1
New Zealand	1
Norway	1
Portugal	1
Senegal	1
Turkey	1
Total	94

== See also ==
- List of top international men's football goalscorers by country
- List of men's footballers with 50 or more international goals
