= List of international goals scored by Ferenc Puskás =

Ferenc Puskás was a Hungarian professional footballer who represented the Hungary national team as a striker between 1945 and 1956. He scored his first international goal on 20 August 1945, during a friendly match against Austria. Since then, he has become Hungary's top scorer in international football, having scored 84 goals in 85 appearances for Hungary.

On 30 October 1946, Puskás scored his first international hat-trick against Luxembourg during a Friendly match. He has scored five international hat-tricks, and on one occasion, four international goals in a single match, on 24 September 1950, during a friendly match against Albania.

In addition, Puskás represented the Spain national team in four matches from 1961 to 1962, thus he scored 84 goals in 89 international appearances overall.

== International goals ==
Hungary score listed first, score column indicates score after each Puskás goal.

International goals by cap, date, venue, opponent, score, result and competition
No.	Cap	Date	Venue	Opponent	Score	Result	Competition	Ref.
1	1	20 August 1945	Hungária körúti stadion, Budapest, Hungary	Austria	1–0	5–2	Friendly	
2	2	30 September 1945	Hungária körúti stadion, Budapest, Hungary	Romania	2–0	7–2	Friendly	
3	2	30 September 1945	Hungária körúti stadion, Budapest, Hungary	Romania	6–2	7–2	Friendly	
4	5	30 October 1946	Stade Émile Mayrisch, Esch-sur-Alzette, Luxembourg	Luxembourg	1–0	7–2	Friendly	
5	5	30 October 1946	Stade Émile Mayrisch, Esch-sur-Alzette, Luxembourg	Luxembourg	4–2	7–2	Friendly	
6	5	30 October 1946	Stade Émile Mayrisch, Esch-sur-Alzette, Luxembourg	Luxembourg	7–2	7–2	Friendly	
7	6	4 May 1947	Hidegkuti Nándor Stadion, Budapest, Hungary	Austria	1–0	5–2	Friendly	
8	7	11 May 1947	Stadio Comunale Vittorio Pozzo, Turin, Italy	Italy	2–2	2–3	Friendly	
9	8	29 June 1947	Stadion Avala, Belgrade, Yugoslavia	Yugoslavia	2–1	3–2	1947 Balkan Cup	
10	10	12 October 1947	Stadionul ONEF, Bucharest, Romania	Romania	2–0	3–0	1947 Balkan Cup	
11	10	12 October 1947	Stadionul ONEF, Bucharest, Romania	Romania	3–0	3–0	1947 Balkan Cup	
12	13	21 April 1948	Hidegkuti Nándor Stadion, Budapest, Hungary	Switzerland	1–0	7–4	1948–53 Dr. Gerö Cup	
13	13	21 April 1948	Hidegkuti Nándor Stadion, Budapest, Hungary	Switzerland	7–4	7–4	1948–53 Dr. Gerö Cup	
14	14	6 June 1948	Hidegkuti Nándor Stadion, Budapest, Hungary	Romania	4–0	9–0	1948 Balkan Cup	
15	14	6 June 1948	Hidegkuti Nándor Stadion, Budapest, Hungary	Romania	9–0	9–0	1948 Balkan Cup	
16	15	24 October 1948	Stadionul Republicii, Bucharest, Romania	Romania	1–0	5–1	1948 Balkan Cup	
17	15	24 October 1948	Stadionul Republicii, Bucharest, Romania	Romania	3–0	5–1	1948 Balkan Cup	
18	15	24 October 1948	Stadionul Republicii, Bucharest, Romania	Romania	5–1	5–1	1948 Balkan Cup	
19	17	10 April 1949	Great Strahov Stadium, Prague, Czechoslovakia	Czechoslovakia	1–2	2–5	1948–53 Dr. Gerö Cup	
20	18	2 May 1949	Hidegkuti Nándor Stadion, Budapest, Hungary	Austria	3–0	6–1	1948–53 Dr. Gerö Cup	
21	18	2 May 1949	Hidegkuti Nándor Stadion, Budapest, Hungary	Austria	5–1	6–1	1948–53 Dr. Gerö Cup	
22	18	2 May 1949	Hidegkuti Nándor Stadion, Budapest, Hungary	Austria	6–1	6–1	1948–53 Dr. Gerö Cup	
23	21	10 July 1949	Oláh Gábor utcai Stadion, Debrecen, Hungary	Poland	3–0	8–2	Friendly	
24	21	10 July 1949	Oláh Gábor utcai Stadion, Debrecen, Hungary	Poland	8–2	8–2	Friendly	
25	22	16 October 1949	Praterstadion, Vienna, Austria	Austria	1–1	4–3	Friendly	
26	22	16 October 1949	Praterstadion, Vienna, Austria	Austria	4–3	4–3	Friendly	
27	23	30 October 1949	Hidegkuti Nándor Stadion, Budapest, Hungary	Bulgaria	4–0	5–0	Friendly	
28	23	30 October 1949	Hidegkuti Nándor Stadion, Budapest, Hungary	Bulgaria	5–0	5–0	Friendly	
29	24	20 November 1949	Hidegkuti Nándor Stadion, Budapest, Hungary	Sweden	2–0	5–0	Friendly	
30	25	30 April 1950	Hidegkuti Nándor Stadion, Budapest, Hungary	Czechoslovakia	1–0	5–0	Friendly	
31	25	30 April 1950	Hidegkuti Nándor Stadion, Budapest, Hungary	Czechoslovakia	5–0	5–0	Friendly	
32	26	14 May 1950	Praterstadion, Vienna, Austria	Austria	2–2	3–5	Friendly	
33	27	4 June 1950	Stadion Wojska Polskiego, Warsaw, Poland	Poland	1–0	5–2	Friendly	
34	27	4 June 1950	Stadion Wojska Polskiego, Warsaw, Poland	Poland	5–1	5–2	Friendly	
35	28	24 September 1950	Hidegkuti Nándor Stadion, Budapest, Hungary	Albania	1–0	12–0	Friendly	
36	28	24 September 1950	Hidegkuti Nándor Stadion, Budapest, Hungary	Albania	4–0	12–0	Friendly	
37	28	24 September 1950	Hidegkuti Nándor Stadion, Budapest, Hungary	Albania	11–0	12–0	Friendly	
38	28	24 September 1950	Hidegkuti Nándor Stadion, Budapest, Hungary	Albania	12–0	12–0	Friendly	
39	29	29 October 1950	Hidegkuti Nándor Stadion, Budapest, Hungary	Austria	1–0	4–3	Friendly	
40	29	29 October 1950	Hidegkuti Nándor Stadion, Budapest, Hungary	Austria	2–0	4–3	Friendly	
41	29	29 October 1950	Hidegkuti Nándor Stadion, Budapest, Hungary	Austria	4–3	4–3	Friendly	
42	31	27 May 1951	Hidegkuti Nándor Stadion, Budapest, Hungary	Poland	4–0	6–0	Friendly	
43	31	27 May 1951	Hidegkuti Nándor Stadion, Budapest, Hungary	Poland	5–0	6–0	Friendly	
44	33	18 November 1951	Hidegkuti Nándor Stadion, Budapest, Hungary	Finland	6–0	8–0	Friendly	
45	33	18 November 1951	Hidegkuti Nándor Stadion, Budapest, Hungary	Finland	7–0	8–0	Friendly	
46	36	27 May 1952	Dynamo Stadium, Moscow, Soviet Union	Soviet Union	1–2	1–2	Friendly	
47	37	15 June 1952	Stadion Wojska Polskiego, Warsaw, Poland	Poland	2–0	5–1	Friendly	
48	37	15 June 1952	Stadion Wojska Polskiego, Warsaw, Poland	Poland	4–0	5–1	Friendly	
49	38	22 June 1952	Helsinki Olympic Stadium, Helsinki, Finland	Finland	1–0	6–1	Friendly	
50	41	24 July 1952	Urheilukeskus, Kotka, Finland	Turkey	4–0	7–1	1952 Summer Olympics	
51	41	24 July 1952	Urheilukeskus, Kotka, Finland	Turkey	7–1	7–1	1952 Summer Olympics	
52	42	28 July 1952	Helsinki Olympic Stadium, Helsinki, Finland	Sweden	1–0	6–0	1952 Summer Olympics	
53	43	2 August 1952	Helsinki Olympic Stadium, Helsinki, Finland	Yugoslavia	1–0	2–0	1952 Summer Olympics	
54	44	20 September 1952	Wankdorf Stadium, Bern, Switzerland	Switzerland	1–2	4–2	1948–53 Dr. Gerö Cup	
55	44	20 September 1952	Wankdorf Stadium, Bern, Switzerland	Switzerland	2–2	4–2	1948–53 Dr. Gerö Cup	
56	47	17 May 1953	Stadio dei Centomila, Rome, Italy	Italy	2–0	3–0	1948–53 Dr. Gerö Cup	
57	47	17 May 1953	Stadio dei Centomila, Rome, Italy	Italy	3–0	3–0	1948–53 Dr. Gerö Cup	
58	48	5 July 1953	Råsunda Stadium, Stockholm, Sweden	Sweden	1–0	4–2	Friendly	
59	49	4 October 1953	Great Strahov Stadium, Prague, Czechoslovakia	Czechoslovakia	5–1	5–1	Friendly	
60	52	25 November 1953	Wembley Stadium, London, England	England	3–1	6–3	Friendly	
61	52	25 November 1953	Wembley Stadium, London, England	England	4–1	6–3	Friendly	
62	53	12 February 1954	Cairo, Egypt	Egypt	1–0	3–0	Friendly	
63	53	12 February 1954	Cairo, Egypt	Egypt	2–0	3–0	Friendly	
64	55	23 May 1954	Népstadion, Budapest, Hungary	England	2–0	7–1	Friendly	
65	55	23 May 1954	Népstadion, Budapest, Hungary	England	7–1	7–1	Friendly	
66	56	17 June 1954	Hardturm Stadium, Zürich, Switzerland	South Korea	1–0	9–0	1954 FIFA World Cup	
67	56	17 June 1954	Hardturm Stadium, Zürich, Switzerland	South Korea	9–0	9–0	1954 FIFA World Cup	
68	57	20 June 1954	St. Jakob Stadium, Basel, Switzerland	Germany	2–0	8–3	1954 FIFA World Cup	
69	58	4 July 1954	Wankdorf Stadium, Bern, Switzerland	Germany	1–0	2–3	1954 FIFA World Cup	
70	65	8 May 1955	Ullevaal Stadion, Oslo, Norway	Norway	3–0	5–0	Friendly	
71	66	11 May 1955	Råsunda Stadium, Stockholm, Sweden	Sweden	2–0	7–3	Friendly	
72	66	11 May 1955	Råsunda Stadium, Stockholm, Sweden	Sweden	6–3	7–3	Friendly	
73	68	19 May 1955	Helsinki Olympic Stadium, Helsinki, Finland	Finland	3–0	9–1	Friendly	
74	70	17 September 1955	Stade olympique de la Pontaise, Lausanne, Switzerland	Switzerland	4–2	5–4	1955–1960 Dr. Gerö Cup	
75	70	17 September 1955	Stade olympique de la Pontaise, Lausanne, Switzerland	Switzerland	5–4	5–4	1955–1960 Dr. Gerö Cup	
76	71	25 September 1955	Népstadion, Budapest, Hungary	Soviet Union	1–1	1–1	Friendly	
77	73	16 October 1955	Népstadion, Budapest, Hungary	Austria	6–1	6–1	1955–1960 Dr. Gerö Cup	
78	74	13 November 1955	Népstadion, Budapest, Hungary	Sweden	3–1	4–2	Friendly	
79	75	27 November 1955	Népstadion, Budapest, Hungary	Italy	1–0	2–0	1955–1960 Dr. Gerö Cup	
80	76	19 February 1956	Fenerbahçe Stadı, Istanbul, Turkey	Turkey	1–3	1–3	Friendly	
81	77	29 February 1956*	Al Manara Stadium, Beirut, Lebanon	Lebanon	2–0	4–1	Friendly	
82	79	3 June 1956	Stade du Heysel, Brussels, Belgium	Belgium	1–1	4–5	Friendly	
83	82	16 September 1956	Stadion Avala, Belgrade, Yugoslavia	Yugoslavia	3–1	3–1	1955–1960 Dr. Gerö Cup	
84	85	14 October 1956	Praterstadion, Vienna, Austria	Austria	1–0	2–0	Friendly	

(* Non-FIFA match)

== Hat-tricks ==
No.	Date	Venue	Opponent	Goals	Result	Competition	Ref.
1	30 October 1946	Stade Émile Mayrisch, Esch-sur-Alzette, Luxembourg	Luxembourg	3 – (15', 60', 85')	7–2	Friendly	
2	24 October 1948	Stadionul Republicii, Bucharest, Romania	Romania	3 – (44', 63', 84')	5–1	1948 Balkan Cup	
3	2 May 1949	Hidegkuti Nándor Stadion, Budapest, Hungary	Austria	3 – (32', 82' pen., 89')	6–1	1948–53 Dr. Gerö Cup	
4	24 September 1950	Hidegkuti Nándor Stadion, Budapest, Hungary	Albania	4 – (18', 36', 75', 82')	12–0	Friendly	
5	19 October 1950	Hidegkuti Nándor Stadion, Budapest, Hungary	Austria	3 – (10', 13', 90')	4–3	Friendly	

== Statistics ==
Appearances and goals by year
Year	Apps	Goals
1945	2	3
1946	3	3
1947	5	5
1948	6	7
1949	8	11
1950	6	12
1951	3	4
1952	12	10
1953	7	6
1954	11	8
1955	12	10
1956	9	4
Total	85	84

Goals by competition
Competition	Goals
Friendlies	53
Balkan Cup	8
Dr. Gerö Cup	15
Summer Olympics	4
FIFA World Cup	4
Total	84

Goals by opponent
Opponent	Goals
Austria	13
Romania	9
Poland	8
Sweden	6
Switzerland	6
Albania	4
Czech Republic	4
England	4
Finland	4
Italy	4
Luxembourg	3
Turkey	3
Yugoslavia	3
Bulgaria	2
Egypt	2
Germany	2
South Korea	2
Soviet Union	2
Yugoslavia	2
Belgium	1
Lebanon	1
Norway	1
Total	84

== See also ==
- List of top international men's football goalscorers by country
- List of men's footballers with 50 or more international goals
