= List of international goals scored by Kinnah Phiri =

Wikimedia list article

Kinnah Phiri is a retired footballer who represented the Malawi national football team from 1973 to 1981. He is the country's all-time top scorer with 71 goals, as well as the second highest goalscorer for an African country, with only Zambia's Godfrey Chitalu ahead of him on 79 goals.

== Career statistics ==
Scores and results list Malawi's goal tally first, score column indicates score after each Phiri goal.

List of international goals scored by Kinnah Phiri
No.	Date	Venue	Opponent	Score	Result	Competition
1	20 January 1974	Curepipe, Mauritius	Mauritius		2–2	Friendly
2	6 July 1974	Blantyre, Malawi	Ivory Coast		5–1	Friendly
3	31 December 1974	Blantyre, Malawi	Tanzania		3–3	Friendly
4	31 December 1974	Blantyre, Malawi	Tanzania		3–3	Friendly
5	31 January 1975	Lilongwe, Malawi	Mauritius		1–1	Friendly
6	2 February 1975	Blantyre, Malawi	Mauritius		3–0	Friendly
7	23 February 1975	Dar-es-Salaam, Tanzania	Tanzania		1–3	Friendly
8	27 February 1975	Zanzibar, Tanzania	Zanzibar		7–2	Friendly
9	27 February 1975	Zanzibar, Tanzania	Zanzibar		7–2	Friendly
10	27 February 1975	Zanzibar, Tanzania	Zanzibar		7–2	Friendly
11	27 February 1975	Zanzibar, Tanzania	Zanzibar		7–2	Friendly
12	29 March 1975	Blantyre, Malawi	Zambia		1–6	1976 African Cup of Nations qualification
13	13 April 1975	Lusaka, Zambia	Zambia		3–3	1976 African Cup of Nations qualification
14	13 April 1975	Lusaka, Zambia	Zambia		3–3	1976 African Cup of Nations qualification
15	10 July 1975	Lilongwe, Malawi	Kenya		3–1	Friendly
16	10 July 1975	Lilongwe, Malawi	Kenya		3–1	Friendly
17	31 August 1975	Blantyre, Malawi	Zambia		1–1	Football at the 1976 Summer Olympics
18	1 November 1975	Ndola, Zambia	Tanzania		3–1	1975 CECAFA Cup
19	1 November 1975	Ndola, Zambia	Tanzania		3–1	1975 CECAFA Cup
20	1 November 1975	Ndola, Zambia	Tanzania		3–1	1975 CECAFA Cup
21	7 November 1975	Chingola, Zambia	Uganda		2–1	1975 CECAFA Cup
22	9 November 1975	Lusaka, Zambia	Kenya		2–2	1975 CECAFA Cup
23	28 February 1976	Blantyre, Malawi	Lesotho		4–1	Friendly
24	6 July 1976	Blantyre, Malawi	Kenya		3–0	Friendly
25	7 July 1976	Blantyre, Malawi	Sierra Leone		4–2	Friendly
26	4 September 1976	Blantyre, Malawi	Uganda		1–1	Friendly
27	13 September 1976	Blantyre, Malawi	Botswana		7–1	Friendly
28	13 September 1976	Blantyre, Malawi	Botswana		7–1	Friendly
29	13 September 1976	Blantyre, Malawi	Botswana		7–1	Friendly
30	13 September 1976	Blantyre, Malawi	Botswana		7–1	Friendly
31	15 September 1976	Lilongwe, Malawi	Botswana		3–0	Friendly
32	15 September 1976	Lilongwe, Malawi	Botswana		3–0	Friendly
33	24 October 1976	Blantyre, Malawi	Mauritius		1–1	1978 African Cup of Nations qualification
34	31 October 1976	Curepipe, Mauritius	Mauritius		2–3	1978 African Cup of Nations qualification
35	9 November 1976	Zanzibar, Tanzania	Kenya		2–2	1976 CECAFA Cup
36	27 March 1977	Lusaka, Zambia	Zambia		1–8	Friendly
37	30 September 1977	Gaborone, Botswana	Botswana		2–0	Friendly
38	1 October 1977	Gaborone, Botswana	Botswana		5–1	Friendly
39	1 October 1977	Gaborone, Botswana	Botswana		5–1	Friendly
40	1 October 1977	Gaborone, Botswana	Botswana		5–1	Friendly
41	1 October 1977	Gaborone, Botswana	Botswana		5–1	Friendly
42	1 October 1977	Gaborone, Botswana	Botswana		5–1	Friendly
43	11 November 1977	Lilongwe, Malawi	Lesotho		3–0	Friendly
44	13 November 1977	Blantyre, Malawi	Lesotho		6–1	Friendly Friendly
45	29 November 1977	Mogadishu, Somalia	Zambia		1–0	1977 CECAFA Cup
46	8 December 1977	Mogadishu Somalia	Kenya		2–1	1977 CECAFA Cup
47	12 December 1977	Nairobi, Kenya	Kenya		1–1	Jamburi Cup
48	18 June 1978	Blantyre, Malawi	Zambia		1–2	Friendly
49	6 July 1978	Blantyre, Malawi	Sierra Leone		5–0	Friendly
50	6 July 1978	Blantyre, Malawi	Sierra Leone		5–0	Friendly
51	18 July 1978	Alger, Algeria	Egypt		1–4	Football at the 1978 All-Africa Games
52	25 July 1978	Alger, Algeria	Nigeria		2–3	Football at the 1978 All-Africa Games
53	25 July 1978	Alger, Algeria	Nigeria		2–3	Football at the 1978 All-Africa Games
54	22 October 1978	Blantyre, Malawi	Algeria		1–1	Friendly
55	24 October 1978	Lilongwe, Malawi	Algeria		2–1	Friendly
56	24 October 1978	Lilongwe, Malawi	Algeria		2–1	Friendly
57	5 November 1978	Blantyre, Malawi	Somalia		3–1	1978 CECAFA Cup
58	11 November 1978	Blantyre, Malawi	Zambia		2–1	1978 CECAFA Cup
59	17 November 1978	Lilongwe, Malawi	Kenya		2–0	1978 CECAFA Cup
60	19 November 1978	Blantyre, Malawi	Zambia		3–2	1978 CECAFA Cup
61	3 December 1978	Antananarivo, Madagascar	Madagascar		1–2	1978 FIFA World Cup qualification
62	17 December 1978	Blantyre, Malawi	Madagascar		5–1	1978 FIFA World Cup qualification
63	17 December 1978	Blantyre, Malawi	Madagascar		5–1	1978 FIFA World Cup qualification
64	6 July 1979	Blantyre, Malawi	Kenya		1–0	Friendly
65	25 August 1979	Maseru, Lesotho	Lesotho		3–0	Friendly
66	25 August 1979	Maseru, Lesotho	Lesotho		3–0	Friendly
67	7 November 1979	Mombasa, Kenya	Sudan		4–0	1979 CECAFA Cup
68	18 April 1981	Gweru, Zimbabwe	Botswana		5–2	Friendly
69	18 April 1981	Gweru, Zimbabwe	Botswana		5–2	Friendly
70	19 June 1981	Blantyre, Malawi	Tanzania		4–1	Friendly
71	21 June 1981	Lilongwe, Malawi	Tanzania		3–1	Friendly
