= List of international goals scored by Wayne Rooney =

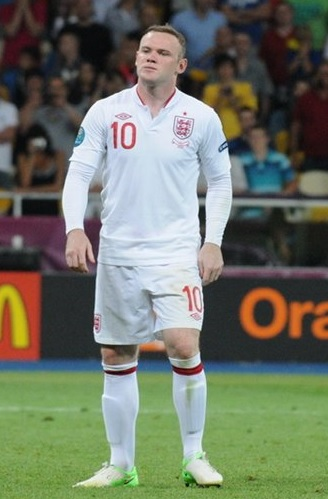
Rooney with England in 2012

Wayne Rooney, an English former association footballer, made his debut for England in a 3–1 defeat to Australia on 13 February 2003. He scored his first international goal later that year, in his sixth appearance for his country, against Macedonia. He retired from international football in November 2018, with a record of 53 goals in 120 international appearances, making him England's second highest scorer behind Harry Kane; he previously surpassed Bobby Charlton's record with a penalty against Switzerland at Wembley Stadium during Euro 2016 qualification.

Rooney's goal against Macedonia made him the youngest goalscorer for England, aged 17 years 317 days, surpassing the record set by Michael Owen who had scored against Morocco in 1998 during the King Hassan II International Cup Tournament. It also made Rooney the youngest scorer in qualifying for the European Championships, a record he held until Israel's Ben Sahar scored against Estonia in March 2007. In June 2004, Rooney scored the first of England's three goals in a victory over Switzerland during Euro 2004, and in doing so became the youngest player to score in a European Championship match. It was a brief record: Switzerland's Johan Vonlanthen, three months younger than Rooney, scored four days later.

Rooney never scored an international hat-trick, although he scored twice in a match on ten occasions. He scored more times against San Marino than against any other team, with five goals against them. More than half of Rooney's goals came away from home: he scored 18 at Wembley Stadium and four in Manchester (two each at Old Trafford and the City of Manchester Stadium).

The majority of Rooney's goals came in qualifying matches. He scored 16 in World Cup qualifiers, including nine during the 2010 World Cup qualification round where he finished as the second-equal top scorer, alongside Bosnia and Herzegovina's Edin Džeko and one behind Greece's Theofanis Gekas. Rooney also scored 14 times in European Championship qualifiers. He scored four times in Euro 2004, ending the tournament as the second-equal top scorer alongside the Netherlands' Ruud van Nistelrooy and one behind the Czech Republic's Milan Baroš. He scored only once in the World Cup finals, in a 2–1 loss to Uruguay in 2014. The remainder of Rooney's goals, 16, came in friendlies.

== International goals ==
England score listed first, score column indicates score after each Rooney goal.

List of international goals scored by Wayne Rooney
| No. | Date | Venue | Cap | Opponent | Score | Result | Competition | Ref |
|---|---|---|---|---|---|---|---|---|
| 1 | 6 September 2003 | Gradski Stadium, Skopje, Macedonia | 6 | Macedonia | 1–1 | 2–1 | UEFA Euro 2004 qualification | |
| 2 | 10 September 2003 | Old Trafford, Manchester, England | 7 | Liechtenstein | 2–0 | 2–0 | UEFA Euro 2004 qualification | |
| 3 | 16 November 2003 | Old Trafford, Manchester, England | 9 | Denmark | 1–0 | 2–3 | Friendly | |
| 4 | 5 June 2004 | City of Manchester Stadium, Manchester, England | 13 | Iceland | 2–0 | 6–1 | Friendly | |
| 5 | 5 June 2004 | City of Manchester Stadium, Manchester, England | 13 | Iceland | 3–0 | 6–1 | Friendly | |
| 6 | 17 June 2004 | Estádio Cidade de Coimbra, Coimbra, Portugal | 15 | Switzerland | 1–0 | 3–0 | UEFA Euro 2004 | (Note: UEFA officially attributed the second goal in this match to Rooney, although it was an own goal by the Swiss goalkeeper, Jörg Stiel.) |
| 7 | 17 June 2004 | Estádio Cidade de Coimbra, Coimbra, Portugal | 15 | Switzerland | 2–0 | 3–0 | UEFA Euro 2004 | (Note: UEFA officially attributed the second goal in this match to Rooney, although it was an own goal by the Swiss goalkeeper, Jörg Stiel.) |
| 8 | 21 June 2004 | Estádio da Luz, Lisbon, Portugal | 16 | Croatia | 2–1 | 4–2 | UEFA Euro 2004 | |
| 9 | 21 June 2004 | Estádio da Luz, Lisbon, Portugal | 16 | Croatia | 3–1 | 4–2 | UEFA Euro 2004 | |
| 10 | 17 August 2005 | Parken Stadium, Copenhagen, Denmark | 24 | Denmark | 1–3 | 1–4 | Friendly | |
| 11 | 12 November 2005 | Stade de Genève, Geneva, Switzerland | 28 | Argentina | 1–1 | 3–2 | Friendly | |
| 12 | 15 November 2006 | Amsterdam Arena, Amsterdam, Netherlands | 36 | Netherlands | 1–0 | 1–1 | Friendly | |
| 13 | 13 October 2007 | Wembley Stadium, London, England | 39 | Estonia | 2–0 | 3–0 | UEFA Euro 2008 qualification | |
| 14 | 17 October 2007 | Luzhniki Stadium, Moscow, Russia | 40 | Russia | 1–0 | 1–2 | UEFA Euro 2008 qualification | |
| 15 | 10 September 2008 | Stadion Maksimir, Zagreb, Croatia | 46 | Croatia | 3–0 | 4–1 | 2010 FIFA World Cup qualification | |
| 16 | 11 October 2008 | Wembley Stadium, London, England | 47 | Kazakhstan | 3–1 | 5–1 | 2010 FIFA World Cup qualification | |
| 17 | 11 October 2008 | Wembley Stadium, London, England | 47 | Kazakhstan | 4–1 | 5–1 | 2010 FIFA World Cup qualification | |
| 18 | 15 October 2008 | Dinamo Stadium, Minsk, Belarus | 48 | Belarus | 2–1 | 3–1 | 2010 FIFA World Cup qualification | |
| 19 | 15 October 2008 | Dinamo Stadium, Minsk, Belarus | 48 | Belarus | 3–1 | 3–1 | 2010 FIFA World Cup qualification | |
| 20 | 28 March 2009 | Wembley Stadium, London, England | 49 | Slovakia | 2–0 | 4–0 | Friendly | |
| 21 | 28 March 2009 | Wembley Stadium, London, England | 49 | Slovakia | 4–0 | 4–0 | Friendly | |
| 22 | 6 June 2009 | Almaty Central Stadium, Almaty, Kazakhstan | 51 | Kazakhstan | 3–0 | 4–0 | 2010 FIFA World Cup qualification | |
| 23 | 10 June 2009 | Wembley Stadium, London, England | 52 | Andorra | 1–0 | 6–0 | 2010 FIFA World Cup qualification | |
| 24 | 10 June 2009 | Wembley Stadium, London, England | 52 | Andorra | 3–0 | 6–0 | 2010 FIFA World Cup qualification | |
| 25 | 9 September 2009 | Wembley Stadium, London, England | 55 | Croatia | 5–1 | 5–1 | 2010 FIFA World Cup qualification | |
| 26 | 7 September 2010 | St. Jakob-Park, Basel, Switzerland | 67 | Switzerland | 1–0 | 3–1 | UEFA Euro 2012 qualification | |
| 27 | 2 September 2011 | Vasil Levski National Stadium, Sofia, Bulgaria | 71 | Bulgaria | 2–0 | 3–0 | UEFA Euro 2012 qualification | |
| 28 | 2 September 2011 | Vasil Levski National Stadium, Sofia, Bulgaria | 71 | Bulgaria | 3–0 | 3–0 | UEFA Euro 2012 qualification | |
| 29 | 19 June 2012 | Donbas Arena, Donetsk, Ukraine | 75 | Ukraine | 1–0 | 1–0 | UEFA Euro 2012 | |
| 30 | 12 October 2012 | Wembley Stadium, London, England | 77 | San Marino | 1–0 | 5–0 | 2014 FIFA World Cup qualification | |
| 31 | 12 October 2012 | Wembley Stadium, London, England | 77 | San Marino | 3–0 | 5–0 | 2014 FIFA World Cup qualification | |
| 32 | 17 October 2012 | National Stadium, Warsaw, Poland | 78 | Poland | 1–0 | 1–1 | 2014 FIFA World Cup qualification | |
| 33 | 6 February 2013 | Wembley Stadium, London, England | 79 | Brazil | 1–0 | 2–1 | Friendly | |
| 34 | 22 March 2013 | San Marino Stadium, Serravalle, San Marino | 80 | San Marino | 6–0 | 8–0 | 2014 FIFA World Cup qualification | |
| 35 | 26 March 2013 | Podgorica City Stadium, Podgorica, Montenegro | 81 | Montenegro | 1–0 | 1–1 | 2014 FIFA World Cup qualification | |
| 36 | 2 June 2013 | Maracanã Stadium, Rio de Janeiro, Brazil | 83 | Brazil | 2–1 | 2–2 | Friendly | |
| 37 | 11 October 2013 | Wembley Stadium, London, England | 85 | Montenegro | 1–0 | 4–1 | 2014 FIFA World Cup qualification | |
| 38 | 15 October 2013 | Wembley Stadium, London, England | 86 | Poland | 1–0 | 2–0 | 2014 FIFA World Cup qualification | |
| 39 | 4 June 2014 | Sun Life Stadium, Miami, United States | 91 | Ecuador | 1–1 | 2–2 | Friendly | |
| 40 | 19 June 2014 | Arena Corinthians, São Paulo, Brazil | 94 | Uruguay | 1–1 | 1–2 | 2014 FIFA World Cup | |
| 41 | 3 September 2014 | Wembley Stadium, London, England | 96 | Norway | 1–0 | 1–0 | Friendly | |
| 42 | 9 October 2014 | Wembley Stadium, London, England | 98 | San Marino | 2–0 | 5–0 | UEFA Euro 2016 qualification | |
| 43 | 12 October 2014 | A. Le Coq Arena, Tallinn, Estonia | 99 | Estonia | 1–0 | 1–0 | UEFA Euro 2016 qualification | |
| 44 | 15 November 2014 | Wembley Stadium, London, England | 100 | Slovenia | 1–1 | 3–1 | UEFA Euro 2016 qualification | |
| 45 | 18 November 2014 | Celtic Park, Glasgow, Scotland | 101 | Scotland | 2–0 | 3–1 | Friendly | |
| 46 | 18 November 2014 | Celtic Park, Glasgow, Scotland | 101 | Scotland | 3–1 | 3–1 | Friendly | |
| 47 | 27 March 2015 | Wembley Stadium, London, England | 102 | Lithuania | 1–0 | 4–0 | UEFA Euro 2016 qualification | |
| 48 | 14 June 2015 | Stožice Stadium, Ljubljana, Slovenia | 105 | Slovenia | 3–2 | 3–2 | UEFA Euro 2016 qualification | |
| 49 | 5 September 2015 | San Marino Stadium, Serravalle, San Marino | 106 | San Marino | 1–0 | 6–0 | UEFA Euro 2016 qualification | |
| 50 | 8 September 2015 | Wembley Stadium, London, England | 107 | Switzerland | 2–0 | 2–0 | UEFA Euro 2016 qualification | |
| 51 | 17 November 2015 | Wembley Stadium, London, England | 109 | France | 2–0 | 2–0 | Friendly | |
| 52 | 27 May 2016 | Stadium of Light, Sunderland, England | 110 | Australia | 2–0 | 2–1 | Friendly | |
| 53 | 27 June 2016 | Stade de Nice, Nice, France | 115 | Iceland | 1–0 | 1–2 | UEFA Euro 2016 | |

== Statistics ==
Caps and goals by year
| Year | Caps | Goals |
|---|---|---|
| 2003 | 9 | 3 |
| 2004 | 11 | 6 |
| 2005 | 8 | 2 |
| 2006 | 8 | 1 |
| 2007 | 4 | 2 |
| 2008 | 8 | 5 |
| 2009 | 9 | 6 |
| 2010 | 11 | 1 |
| 2011 | 5 | 2 |
| 2012 | 5 | 4 |
| 2013 | 10 | 6 |
| 2014 | 13 | 8 |
| 2015 | 8 | 5 |
| 2016 | 10 | 2 |
| 2017 | 0 | 0 |
| 2018 | 1 | 0 |
| Total | 120 | 53 |

Caps and goals by competition
| Competition | Caps | Goals |
|---|---|---|
| FIFA World Cup | 11 | 1 |
| FIFA World Cup qualification | 26 | 16 |
| UEFA European Championship | 10 | 6 |
| UEFA European Championship qualifying | 27 | 14 |
| Friendlies | 46 | 16 |
| Total | 120 | 53 |

Goals by opponent
| Opponent | Goals |
|---|---|
| San Marino | 5 |
| Croatia | 4 |
| Switzerland | 4 |
| Iceland | 3 |
| Kazakhstan | 3 |
| Andorra | 2 |
| Belarus | 2 |
| Brazil | 2 |
| Bulgaria | 2 |
| Denmark | 2 |
| Estonia | 2 |
| Montenegro | 2 |
| Poland | 2 |
| Scotland | 2 |
| Slovakia | 2 |
| Slovenia | 2 |
| Argentina | 1 |
| Australia | 1 |
| Ecuador | 1 |
| France | 1 |
| Liechtenstein | 1 |
| Lithuania | 1 |
| Netherlands | 1 |
| North Macedonia | 1 |
| Norway | 1 |
| Russia | 1 |
| Ukraine | 1 |
| Uruguay | 1 |
