= List of international goals scored by David Villa =

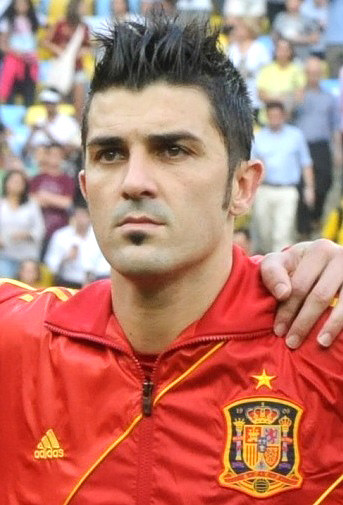
Villa lining up for Spain before a FIFA Confederations Cup match against Tahiti in 2013, in which he scored one of his three international hat-tricks

David Villa is a Spanish professional association footballer who represented the Spain national football team from 2005 to 2017. He made his debut for Spain as a substitute in a 2006 FIFA World Cup qualification match against San Marino in February 2005. He scored his first international goal on his fourth appearance for Spain, scoring from the bench to equalise in the second leg of the 2006 World Cup qualification play-offs. He scored 59 goals in 98 international appearances, making him Spain's all-time top scorer; he surpassed Raúl's previous record of 44 when he scored twice against the Czech Republic in UEFA Euro 2012 qualifying in March 2011.

Villa achieved his inaugural international hat-trick on 10 June 2008 when he scored the first three goals in a 4–1 victory for Spain over Russia during UEFA Euro 2008 to win group D. He scored two other hat-tricks, against Azerbaijan (in 2009) and Tahiti (in 2013). He scored more times against Liechtenstein than any other nation, with seven, including twice in a single match on three occasions. Twenty of Villa's goals were scored at home at thirteen different venues.

Villa scored more goals in qualifying matches than in any other type of match, with 21. He scored nineteen times in friendlies, nine times in FIFA World Cup matches, six times in the FIFA Confederations Cup and four times in UEFA European Championship matches. Villa was equal top scorer at the 2010 FIFA World Cup, alongside Germany's Thomas Müller, Netherlands' Wesley Sneijder and Uruguay's Diego Forlán, all of whom scored five goals in the tournament. Villa broke his leg playing for his club team FC Barcelona in December 2011, which resulted in his failure to take part in Spain's victorious UEFA Euro 2012 campaign. He left Barcelona in 2013 to join La Liga opposition team Atlético Madrid for a season before moving to New York City FC in Major League Soccer in the summer of 2014. His last international goal came in June 2014, against Australia at the 2014 FIFA World Cup. After his move to the United States in 2014, he only played one more game for Spain, a 2018 World Cup qualifier against Italy in September 2017. After joining Japanese side Vissel Kobe in 2018, Villa announced his retirement from football at the end of the 2019 J1 League season.

== International goals ==
Scores and results list Spain's goal tally first.

Key
| ‡ | Indicates goal was scored from a penalty kick |

| No. | Cap | Date | Venue | Opponent | Score | Result | Competition | Ref. |
|---|---|---|---|---|---|---|---|---|
| 1 | 4 | 16 November 2005 | Tehelné pole, Bratislava, Slovakia | Slovakia | 1–1 | 1–1 | 2006 FIFA World Cup qualification | |
| 2 | 5 | 1 March 2006 | José Zorrilla, Valladolid, Spain | Ivory Coast | 1–1 | 3–2 | Friendly | |
| 3 | 9 | 13 June 2006 | Zentralstadion, Leipzig, Germany | Ukraine | 2–0 | 4–0 | 2006 FIFA World Cup | |
| 4 | 9 | 13 June 2006 | Zentralstadion, Leipzig, Germany | Ukraine | 3–0‡ | 4–0 | 2006 FIFA World Cup | |
| 5 | 12 | 27 June 2006 | AWD-Arena, Hanover, Germany | France | 1–0‡ | 1–3 | 2006 FIFA World Cup | |
| 6 | 14 | 2 September 2006 | Nuevo Vivero, Badajoz, Spain | Liechtenstein | 2–0 | 4–0 | UEFA Euro 2008 qualifying | |
| 7 | 14 | 2 September 2006 | Nuevo Vivero, Badajoz, Spain | Liechtenstein | 3–0 | 4–0 | UEFA Euro 2008 qualifying | |
| 8 | 15 | 6 September 2006 | Windsor Park, Belfast, Northern Ireland | Northern Ireland | 2–1 | 2–3 | UEFA Euro 2008 qualifying | |
| 9 | 17 | 11 October 2006 | Nueva Condomina, Murcia, Spain | Argentina | 2–1‡ | 2–1 | Friendly | |
| 10 | 20 | 24 March 2007 | Santiago Bernabéu, Madrid, Spain | Denmark | 2–0 | 2–1 | UEFA Euro 2008 qualifying | |
| 11 | 23 | 6 June 2007 | Rheinpark Stadion, Vaduz, Liechtenstein | Liechtenstein | 1–0 | 2–0 | UEFA Euro 2008 qualifying | |
| 12 | 23 | 6 June 2007 | Rheinpark Stadion, Vaduz, Liechtenstein | Liechtenstein | 2–0 | 2–0 | UEFA Euro 2008 qualifying | |
| 13 | 30 | 26 March 2008 | Martínez Valero, Elche, Spain | Italy | 1–0 | 1–0 | Friendly | |
| 14 | 31 | 31 May 2008 | Nuevo Colombino, Huelva, Spain | Peru | 1–0 | 2–1 | Friendly | |
| 15 | 32 | 10 June 2008 | Tivoli-Neu, Innsbruck, Austria | Russia | 1–0 | 4–1 | UEFA Euro 2008 | |
| 16 | 32 | 10 June 2008 | Tivoli-Neu, Innsbruck, Austria | Russia | 2–0 | 4–1 | UEFA Euro 2008 | |
| 17 | 32 | 10 June 2008 | Tivoli-Neu, Innsbruck, Austria | Russia | 3–0 | 4–1 | UEFA Euro 2008 | |
| 18 | 33 | 14 June 2008 | Tivoli-Neu, Innsbruck, Austria | Sweden | 2–1 | 2–1 | UEFA Euro 2008 | |
| 19 | 37 | 6 September 2008 | Nueva Condomina, Murcia, Spain | Bosnia and Herzegovina | 1–0 | 1–0 | 2010 FIFA World Cup qualification | |
| 20 | 38 | 10 September 2008 | Carlos Belmonte, Albacete, Spain | Armenia | 2–0 | 4–0 | 2010 FIFA World Cup qualification | |
| 21 | 38 | 10 September 2008 | Carlos Belmonte, Albacete, Spain | Armenia | 3–0 | 4–0 | 2010 FIFA World Cup qualification | |
| 22 | 39 | 11 October 2008 | A. Le Coq Arena, Tallinn, Estonia | Estonia | 2–0 | 3–0 | 2010 FIFA World Cup qualification | |
| 23 | 40 | 15 October 2008 | King Baudouin Stadium, Brussels, Belgium | Belgium | 2–1 | 2–1 | 2010 FIFA World Cup qualification | |
| 24 | 41 | 19 November 2008 | El Madrigal, Villarreal, Spain | Chile | 1–0‡ | 3–0 | Friendly | |
| 25 | 42 | 11 February 2009 | Ramon Sánchez Pizjuán, Seville, Spain | England | 1–0 | 2–0 | Friendly | |
| 26 | 44 | 9 June 2009 | Tofiq Bahramov Republican Stadium, Baku, Azerbaijan | Azerbaijan | 1–0 | 6–0 | Friendly | |
| 27 | 44 | 9 June 2009 | Tofiq Bahramov Republican Stadium, Baku, Azerbaijan | Azerbaijan | 2–0 | 6–0 | Friendly | |
| 28 | 44 | 9 June 2009 | Tofiq Bahramov Republican Stadium, Baku, Azerbaijan | Azerbaijan | 3–0 | 6–0 | Friendly | |
| 29 | 45 | 14 June 2009 | Royal Bafokeng Stadium, Rustenburg, South Africa | New Zealand | 5–0 | 5–0 | 2009 FIFA Confederations Cup | |
| 30 | 46 | 17 June 2009 | Free State Stadium, Bloemfontein, South Africa | Iraq | 1–0 | 1–0 | 2009 FIFA Confederations Cup | |
| 31 | 47 | 20 June 2009 | Free State Stadium, Bloemfontein, South Africa | South Africa | 1–0 | 2–0 | 2009 FIFA Confederations Cup | |
| 32 | 51 | 5 September 2009 | Riazor, A Coruña, Spain | Belgium | 2–0 | 5–0 | 2010 FIFA World Cup qualification | |
| 33 | 51 | 5 September 2009 | Riazor, A Coruña, Spain | Belgium | 5–0 | 5–0 | 2010 FIFA World Cup qualification | |
| 34 | 54 | 18 November 2009 | Ernst-Happel-Stadion, Vienna, Austria | Austria | 2–1 | 5–1 | Friendly | |
| 35 | 54 | 18 November 2009 | Ernst-Happel-Stadion, Vienna, Austria | Austria | 3–1 | 5–1 | Friendly | |
| 36 | 55 | 3 March 2010 | Stade de France, Saint-Denis, France | France | 1–0 | 2–0 | Friendly | |
| 37 | 56 | 29 May 2010 | Tivoli-Neu, Innsbruck, Austria | Saudi Arabia | 1–1 | 3–2 | Friendly | |
| 38 | 60 | 21 June 2010 | Ellis Park Stadium, Johannesburg, South Africa | Honduras | 1–0 | 2–0 | 2010 FIFA World Cup | |
| 39 | 60 | 21 June 2010 | Ellis Park Stadium, Johannesburg, South Africa | Honduras | 2–0 | 2–0 | 2010 FIFA World Cup | |
| 40 | 61 | 25 June 2010 | Loftus Versfeld Stadium, Pretoria, South Africa | Chile | 1–0 | 2–1 | 2010 FIFA World Cup | |
| 41 | 62 | 29 June 2010 | Cape Town Stadium, Cape Town, South Africa | Portugal | 1–0 | 1–0 | 2010 FIFA World Cup | |
| 42 | 63 | 3 July 2010 | Ellis Park Stadium, Johannesburg, South Africa | Paraguay | 1–0 | 1–0 | 2010 FIFA World Cup | |
| 43 | 66 | 3 September 2010 | Rheinpark Stadion, Vaduz, Liechtenstein | Liechtenstein | 2–0 | 4–0 | UEFA Euro 2012 qualifying | |
| 44 | 69 | 12 October 2010 | Hampden Park, Glasgow, Scotland | Scotland | 1–0‡ | 3–2 | UEFA Euro 2012 qualifying | |
| 45 | 72 | 25 March 2011 | Los Cármenes, Granada, Spain | Czech Republic | 1–1 | 2–1 | UEFA Euro 2012 qualifying | |
| 46 | 72 | 25 March 2011 | Los Cármenes, Granada, Spain | Czech Republic | 2–1 | 2–1 | UEFA Euro 2012 qualifying | |
| 47 | 75 | 7 June 2011 | Estadio José Antonio Anzoátegui, Puerto la Cruz, Venezuela | Venezuela | 1–0 | 3–0 | Friendly | |
| 48 | 78 | 6 September 2011 | Las Gaunas, Logroño, Spain | Liechtenstein | 5–0 | 6–0 | UEFA Euro 2012 qualifying | |
| 49 | 78 | 6 September 2011 | Las Gaunas, Logroño, Spain | Liechtenstein | 6–0 | 6–0 | UEFA Euro 2012 qualifying | |
| 50 | 80 | 11 October 2011 | José Rico Pérez, Alicante, Spain | Scotland | 3–0 | 3–1 | UEFA Euro 2012 qualifying | |
| 51 | 82 | 15 November 2011 | Estadio Nacional, San José, Costa Rica | Costa Rica | 2–2 | 2–2 | Friendly | |
| 52 | 83 | 7 September 2012 | Pasarón, Pontevedra, Spain | Saudi Arabia | 4–0‡ | 5–0 | Friendly | |
| 53 | 85 | 14 November 2012 | Estadio Rommel Fernández, Panama City, Panama | Panama | 2–0 | 5–1 | Friendly | |
| 54 | 90 | 20 June 2013 | Estádio do Maracanã, Rio de Janeiro, Brazil | Tahiti | 4–0 | 10–0 | 2013 FIFA Confederations Cup | |
| 55 | 90 | 20 June 2013 | Estádio do Maracanã, Rio de Janeiro, Brazil | Tahiti | 5–0 | 10–0 | 2013 FIFA Confederations Cup | |
| 56 | 90 | 20 June 2013 | Estádio do Maracanã, Rio de Janeiro, Brazil | Tahiti | 7–0 | 10–0 | 2013 FIFA Confederations Cup | |
| 57 | 96 | 7 June 2014 | FedExField, Washington, D.C., United States | El Salvador | 1–0 | 2–0 | Friendly | |
| 58 | 96 | 7 June 2014 | FedExField, Washington, D.C., United States | El Salvador | 2–0 | 2–0 | Friendly | |
| 59 | 97 | 23 June 2014 | Arena da Baixada, Curitiba, Brazil | Australia | 1–0 | 3–0 | 2014 FIFA World Cup | |

== Hat-tricks ==
| No. | Opponent | Goals | Score | Venue | Competition | Date |
|---|---|---|---|---|---|---|
| 1 | Russia | 3 – (1–0', 2–0', 3–0') | 4–1 | Tivoli-Neu, Innsbruck, Austria | UEFA Euro 2008 | 10 June 2008 |
| 2 | Azerbaijan | 3 – (1–0', 2–0', 3–0') | 6–0 | Tofiq Bahramov Republican Stadium, Baku, Azerbaijan | Friendly | 9 June 2009 |
| 3 | Tahiti | 3 – (4–0', 5–0', 7–0') | 10–0 | Estádio do Maracanã, Rio de Janeiro, Brazil | 2013 FIFA Confederations Cup | 20 June 2013 |

== Statistics ==
Appearances and goals by year
| Year | Apps | Goals |
|---|---|---|
| 2005 | 4 | 1 |
| 2006 | 14 | 8 |
| 2007 | 10 | 3 |
| 2008 | 13 | 12 |
| 2009 | 13 | 11 |
| 2010 | 16 | 9 |
| 2011 | 12 | 7 |
| 2012 | 3 | 2 |
| 2013 | 10 | 3 |
| 2014 | 2 | 3 |
| 2017 | 1 | 0 |
| Total | 98 | 59 |

Appearances and goals by competition
| Competition | Apps | Goals |
|---|---|---|
| Friendlies | 39 | 19 |
| UEFA Euro qualifying | 19 | 13 |
| FIFA World Cup finals | 12 | 9 |
| FIFA World Cup qualification | 16 | 8 |
| FIFA Confederations Cup | 8 | 6 |
| UEFA European Championship | 4 | 4 |
| Total | 98 | 59 |

Goals by opponent
| Opponent | Goals |
|---|---|
| Liechtenstein | 7 |
| Azerbaijan | 3 |
| Belgium | 3 |
| Russia | 3 |
| Tahiti | 3 |
| Armenia | 2 |
| Austria | 2 |
| Chile | 2 |
| Czech Republic | 2 |
| El Salvador | 2 |
| France | 2 |
| Honduras | 2 |
| Saudi Arabia | 2 |
| Scotland | 2 |
| Ukraine | 2 |
| Argentina | 1 |
| Australia | 1 |
| Bosnia and Herzegovina | 1 |
| Costa Rica | 1 |
| Denmark | 1 |
| England | 1 |
| Estonia | 1 |
| Iraq | 1 |
| Italy | 1 |
| Ivory Coast | 1 |
| New Zealand | 1 |
| Northern Ireland | 1 |
| Panama | 1 |
| Paraguay | 1 |
| Peru | 1 |
| Portugal | 1 |
| Slovakia | 1 |
| South Africa | 1 |
| Sweden | 1 |
| Venezuela | 1 |
| Total | 59 |

== See also ==
- List of men's footballers with 50 or more international goals
- List of top international men's football goal scorers by country
- Spain national football team records and statistics
