= List of international goals scored by Luis Suárez =

Luis Suárez is a Uruguayan professional footballer who formerly represented the Uruguay national team as a striker. He made his debut for his country in a 3–1 friendly victory over Colombia in Cúcuta on 7 February 2007. His final international appearance was a 0–0 World Cup qualifying draw against Paraguay in Montevideo on 6 September 2024. In total, Suárez recorded 69 international goals in 143 appearances, making him the nation's all-time top scorer.

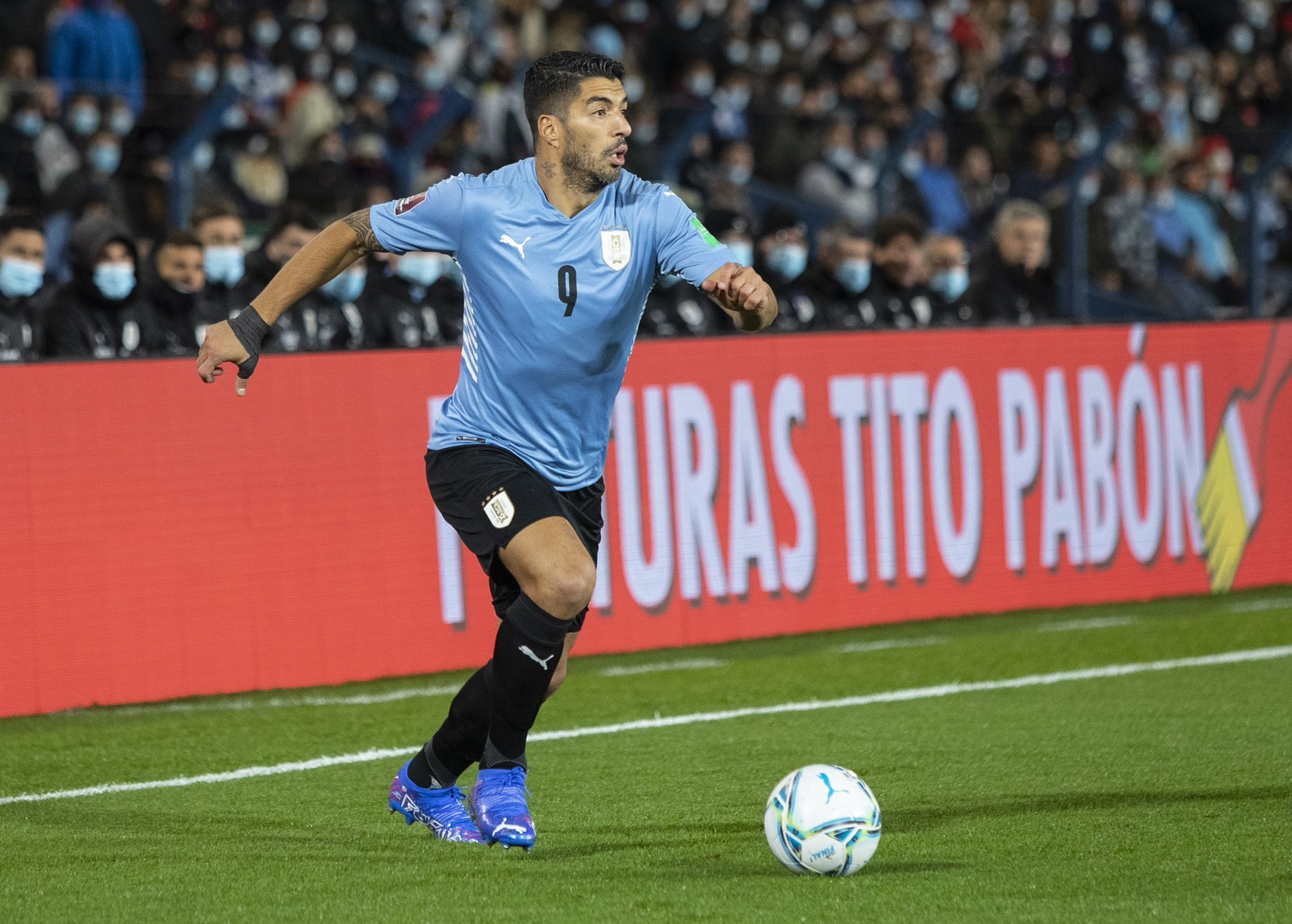
Suárez playing for Uruguay against Colombia in 2021 at the 2022 FIFA World Cup qualification.

Suárez's first goal came in his third appearance for Uruguay, scoring the opener in a 5–0 FIFA World Cup qualification win against Bolivia in October 2007. He became his country's top scorer at the age of 26, when he scored twice against Tahiti in a FIFA Confederations Cup group match in June 2013. Suárez scored eleven goals during Uruguay's qualification campaign for the 2014 FIFA World Cup, making him joint top scorer with Robin van Persie during qualification. Following an incident in which he was adjudged to have bitten Italy's Giorgio Chiellini during the finals, Suárez was banned for nine international games and did not feature for Uruguay in 2015. His goal in the 1–0 victory over Saudi Arabia in the group stage of the 2018 World Cup made Suárez the only Uruguayan to score in three World Cup final tournaments (a feat matched later on by teammate Edinson Cavani).

Suárez scored three or more goals (a hat-trick) for Uruguay on two occasions: he scored three times against Indonesia in a 7–1 friendly win in October 2010, and all four goals in a 4–0 World Cup qualification victory against Chile in November 2011. Suárez scored 29 goals in FIFA World Cup qualifiers, making him the second highest all-time top scorer of qualification in CONMEBOL, behind only club teammate Lionel Messi. Suárez scored seven times in World Cup finals, eight times in the Copa América, and three times in the FIFA Confederations Cup. The remainder of his goals, 22, came in friendly matches.

Suárez scored more times (eight) against Chile than any other opponent. 21 of his goals were scored at the Estadio Centenario, with the remainder coming at overseas venues. His final international goal came on 13 July 2024, when he scored the late equaliser in Uruguay's 2–2 Copa América draw against Canada.

== International goals ==
Uruguay score listed first, score column indicates score after each Suárez goal.

Key
‡	Indicates goal was scored from a penalty kick

International goals by cap, date, venue, opponent, score, result and competition
No.	Cap	Date	Venue	Opponent	Score	Result	Competition	Ref.
1	3	13 October 2007	Estadio Centenario, Montevideo, Uruguay	Bolivia	1–0	5–0	2010 FIFA World Cup qualification	
2	5	18 November 2007	Estadio Centenario, Montevideo, Uruguay	Chile	1–0	2–2	2010 FIFA World Cup qualification	
3	7	6 February 2008	Estadio Centenario, Montevideo, Uruguay	Colombia	2–2	2–2	Friendly	
4	8	25 May 2008	Ruhrstadion, Bochum, Germany	Turkey	1–0	3–2	Friendly	
5	8	25 May 2008	Ruhrstadion, Bochum, Germany	Turkey	2–2	3–2	Friendly	
6	9	28 May 2008	Ullevaal Stadion, Oslo, Norway	Norway	1–0	2–2	Friendly	
7	21	10 June 2009	Polideportivo Cachamay, Puerto Ordaz, Venezuela	Venezuela	1–1	2–2	2010 FIFA World Cup qualification	
8	24	9 September 2009	Estadio Centenario, Montevideo, Uruguay	Colombia	1–0	3–1	2010 FIFA World Cup qualification	
9	25	10 October 2009	Estadio Olímpico Atahualpa, Quito, Ecuador	Ecuador	1–1	2–1	2010 FIFA World Cup qualification	
10	29	3 March 2010	AFG Arena, St. Gallen, Switzerland	Switzerland	2–1	3–1	Friendly	
11	33	22 June 2010	Royal Bafokeng Stadium, Rustenburg, South Africa	Mexico	1–0	1–0	2010 FIFA World Cup	
12	34	26 June 2010	Nelson Mandela Bay Stadium, Port Elizabeth, South Africa	South Korea	1–0	2–1	2010 FIFA World Cup	
13	34	26 June 2010	Nelson Mandela Bay Stadium, Port Elizabeth, South Africa	South Korea	2–1	2–1	2010 FIFA World Cup	
14	37	8 October 2010	Gelora Bung Karno Stadium, Jakarta, Indonesia	Indonesia	2–1	7–1	Friendly	
15	37	8 October 2010	Gelora Bung Karno Stadium, Jakarta, Indonesia	Indonesia	3–1	7–1	Friendly	
16	37	8 October 2010	Gelora Bung Karno Stadium, Jakarta, Indonesia	Indonesia	5–1	7–1	Friendly	
17	41	8 June 2011	Estadio Centenario, Montevideo, Uruguay	Netherlands	1–0	1–1	Friendly	
18	43	4 July 2011	Estadio del Bicentenario, San Juan, Argentina	Peru	1–1	1–1	2011 Copa América	
19	47	19 July 2011	Estadio Ciudad de La Plata, La Plata, Argentina	Peru	1–0	2–0	2011 Copa América	
20	47	19 July 2011	Estadio Ciudad de La Plata, La Plata, Argentina	Peru	2–0	2–0	2011 Copa América	
21	48	24 July 2011	Estadio Monumental, Buenos Aires, Argentina	Paraguay	1–0	3–0	2011 Copa América final	
22	50	7 October 2011	Estadio Centenario, Montevideo, Uruguay	Bolivia	1–0	4–2	2014 FIFA World Cup qualification	
23	52	11 November 2011	Estadio Centenario, Montevideo, Uruguay	Chile	1–0	4–0	2014 FIFA World Cup qualification	
24	52	11 November 2011	Estadio Centenario, Montevideo, Uruguay	Chile	2–0	4–0	2014 FIFA World Cup qualification	
25	52	11 November 2011	Estadio Centenario, Montevideo, Uruguay	Chile	3–0	4–0	2014 FIFA World Cup qualification	
26	52	11 November 2011	Estadio Centenario, Montevideo, Uruguay	Chile	4–0	4–0	2014 FIFA World Cup qualification	
27	54	25 May 2012	Lokomotiv Stadium, Moscow, Russia	Russia	1–0	1–1	Friendly	
28	56	10 June 2012	Estadio Centenario, Montevideo, Uruguay	Peru	1–0	4–2	2014 FIFA World Cup qualification	
29	59	16 October 2012	Estadio Hernando Siles, La Paz, Bolivia	Bolivia	1–4	1–4	2014 FIFA World Cup qualification	
30	60	14 November 2012	PGE Arena Gdańsk, Gdańsk, Poland	Poland	3–1	3–1	Friendly	
31	62	22 March 2013	Estadio Centenario, Montevideo, Uruguay	Paraguay	1–0	1–1	2014 FIFA World Cup qualification	
32	64	5 June 2013	Estadio Centenario, Montevideo, Uruguay	France	1–0	1–0	Friendly	
33	65	16 June 2013	Arena Pernambuco, Recife, Brazil	Spain	1–2	1–2	2013 FIFA Confederations Cup	
34	67	23 June 2013	Arena Pernambuco, Recife, Brazil	Tahiti	7–0	8–0	2013 FIFA Confederations Cup	
35	67	23 June 2013	Arena Pernambuco, Recife, Brazil	Tahiti	8–0	8–0	2013 FIFA Confederations Cup	
36	70	14 August 2013	Miyagi Stadium, Rifu, Japan	Japan	3–0	4–2	Friendly	
37	71	6 September 2013	Estadio Nacional, Lima, Peru	Peru	1–0‡	2–1	2014 FIFA World Cup qualification	
38	71	6 September 2013	Estadio Nacional, Lima, Peru	Peru	2–0	2–1	2014 FIFA World Cup qualification	
39	74	15 October 2013	Estadio Centenario, Montevideo, Uruguay	Argentina	2–1	3–2	2014 FIFA World Cup qualification	
40	78	19 June 2014	Arena Corinthians, São Paulo, Brazil	England	1–0	2–1	2014 FIFA World Cup	
41	78	19 June 2014	Arena Corinthians, São Paulo, Brazil	England	2–1	2–1	2014 FIFA World Cup	
42	81	13 October 2014	Al-Buraimi Stadium, Al-Buraimi, Oman	Oman	1–0	3–0	Friendly	
43	81	13 October 2014	Al-Buraimi Stadium, Al-Buraimi, Oman	Oman	2–0	3–0	Friendly	
44	82	13 November 2014	Estadio Centenario, Montevideo, Uruguay	Costa Rica	1–1	3–3	Friendly	
45	83	25 March 2016	Arena Pernambuco, Recife, Brazil	Brazil	2–2	2–2	2018 FIFA World Cup qualification	
46	86	6 September 2016	Estadio Centenario, Montevideo, Uruguay	Paraguay	3–0	4–0	2018 FIFA World Cup qualification	
47	88	11 October 2016	Estadio Metropolitano Roberto Meléndez, Barranquilla, Colombia	Colombia	2–1	2–2	2018 FIFA World Cup qualification	
48	95	10 October 2017	Estadio Centenario, Montevideo, Uruguay	Bolivia	3–1	4–2	2018 FIFA World Cup qualification	
49	95	10 October 2017	Estadio Centenario, Montevideo, Uruguay	Bolivia	4–1	4–2	2018 FIFA World Cup qualification	
50	96	23 March 2018	Guangxi Sports Center, Nanning, China	Czech Republic	1–0	2–0	2018 China Cup	
51	98	7 June 2018	Estadio Centenario, Montevideo, Uruguay	Uzbekistan	2–0‡	3–0	Friendly	
52	100	20 June 2018	Rostov Arena, Rostov-on-Don, Russia	Saudi Arabia	1–0	1–0	2018 FIFA World Cup	
53	101	25 June 2018	Cosmos Arena, Samara, Russia	Russia	1–0	3–0	2018 FIFA World Cup	
54	104	7 September 2018	NRG Stadium, Houston, United States	Mexico	2–1	4–1	Friendly	
55	104	7 September 2018	NRG Stadium, Houston, United States	Mexico	3–1‡	4–1	Friendly	
56	107	7 June 2019	Estadio Centenario, Montevideo, Uruguay	Panama	2–0	3–0	Friendly	
57	108	16 June 2019	Estádio Mineirão, Belo Horizonte, Brazil	Ecuador	3–0	4–0	2019 Copa América	
58	109	20 June 2019	Arena do Grêmio, Porto Alegre, Brazil	Japan	1–1	2–2	2019 Copa América	
59	113	18 November 2019	Bloomfield Stadium, Tel Aviv, Israel	Argentina	2–1	2–2	Friendly	
60	114	8 October 2020	Estadio Centenario, Montevideo, Uruguay	Chile	1–0‡	2–1	2022 FIFA World Cup qualification	
61	115	13 October 2020	Estadio Rodrigo Paz Delgado, Quito, Ecuador	Ecuador	1–4‡	2–4	2022 FIFA World Cup qualification	
62	115	13 October 2020	Estadio Rodrigo Paz Delgado, Quito, Ecuador	Ecuador	2–4‡	2–4	2022 FIFA World Cup qualification	
63	116	13 November 2020	Estadio Metropolitano Roberto Meléndez, Barranquilla, Colombia	Colombia	2–0‡	3–0	2022 FIFA World Cup qualification	
64	120	21 June 2021	Arena Pantanal, Cuiabá, Brazil	Chile	1–1	1–1	2021 Copa América	
65	126	14 October 2021	Arena da Amazônia, Manaus, Brazil	Brazil	1–3	1–4	2022 FIFA World Cup qualification	
66	129	27 January 2022	Estadio General Pablo Rojas, Asunción, Paraguay	Paraguay	1–0	1–0	2022 FIFA World Cup qualification	
67	130	1 February 2022	Estadio Centenario, Montevideo, Uruguay	Venezuela	4–0‡	4–1	2022 FIFA World Cup qualification	
68	132	29 March 2022	Estadio San Carlos de Apoquindo, Santiago, Chile	Chile	1–0	2–0	2022 FIFA World Cup qualification	
69	142	13 July 2024	Bank of America Stadium, Charlotte, United States	Canada	2–2	2–2 (4–3 p)	2024 Copa América	

_{Note: In a World Cup qualifier on 10 June 2012 where Uruguay defeated Peru 4–2, FIFA's match summary lists Suárez as the scorer of the opening goal. FIFA has also published reports where they credit the goal to Sebastián Coates. Other notable sources also credit the goal to Coates. Suárez himself also insisted that Coates scored the goal, therefore it is not listed in his tally above.}

== Statistics ==
Appearances and goals by year
Year	Apps	Goals
2007	6	2
2008	10	4
2009	12	3
2010	11	7
2011	13	10
2012	8	4
2013	16	9
2014	6	5
2015	0	0
2016	8	3
2017	5	2
2018	11	6
2019	7	4
2020	3	4
2021	12	2
2022	9	3
2023	1	0
2024	5	1
Total	143	69

Goals by competition
Competition	Goals
FIFA World Cup qualification	29
Friendlies	22
Copa América	8
FIFA World Cup	7
FIFA Confederations Cup	3
Total	69

Goals by opponent
Opponent	Goals
Chile	8
Peru	6
Bolivia	5
Colombia	4
Ecuador	4
Paraguay	4
Indonesia	3
Mexico	3
Argentina	2
Brazil	2
England	2
Japan	2
Oman	2
Russia	2
South Korea	2
Tahiti	2
Turkey	2
Venezuela	2
Canada	1
Costa Rica	1
Czech Republic	1
France	1
Netherlands	1
Norway	1
Panama	1
Poland	1
Saudi Arabia	1
Spain	1
Switzerland	1
Uzbekistan	1
Total	69

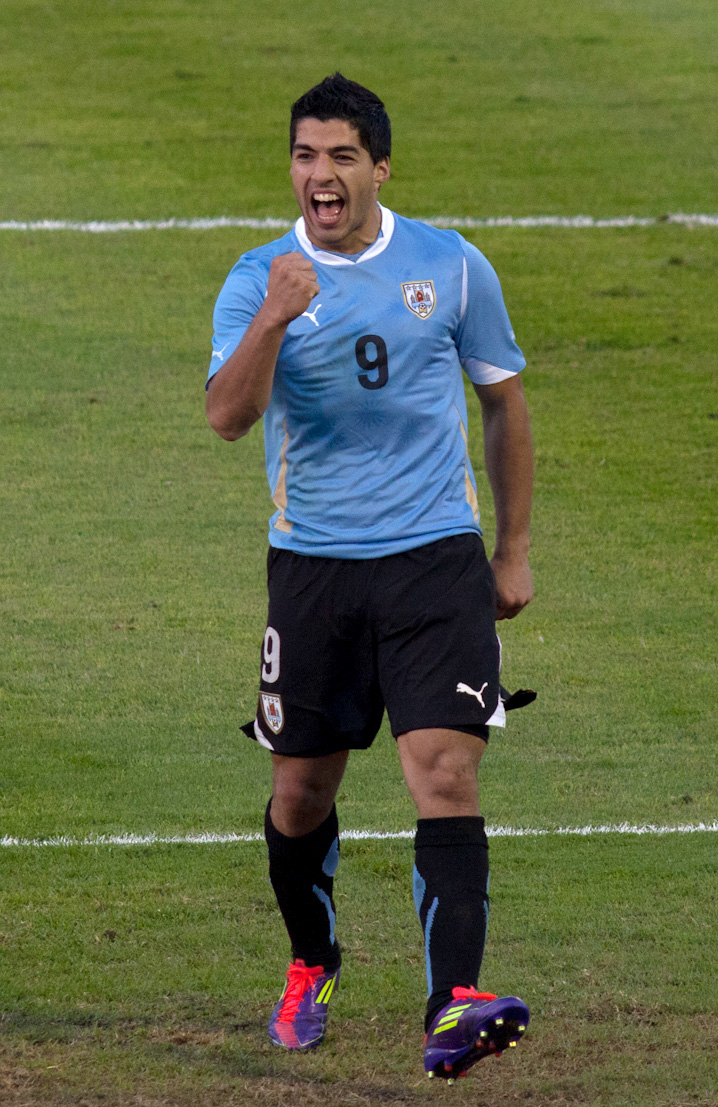
Suárez celebrating his goal for Uruguay against the Netherlands in 2011
