= List of international goals scored by Hussein Saeed =

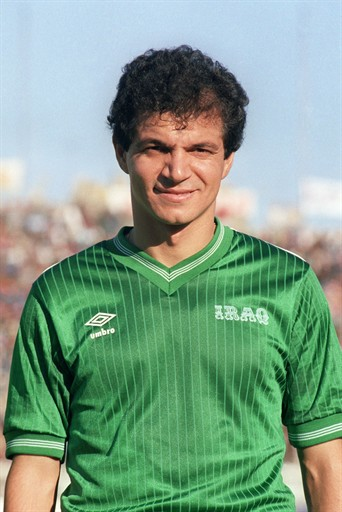
Saeed has scored 78 international goals since making his debut for Iraq in 1976

Hussein Saeed Mohammed is an Iraqi former footballer who played as a forward and is a former president of the Iraq Football Association. Saeed is in twelfth place in the list of top international goal scorers, with 78 goals. Along with Ahmed Radhi, he is considered to be the best Iraqi player of the 20th century and features in 25th place in Asia's Best Players of the Century list. Hussein's 78 international goals make him currently the Iraqi national team's highest scoring player.

Saeed scored his debut goal during his fourth appearance for the national team against Indonesia in the 1977 Merdeka Tournament. His first hat-trick was recorded in a friendly match against Algeria on 21 February 1978, where Iraq secured a 3–0 victory. Over the course of his career, he has participated in 137 matches for the Iraq national team, scoring a total of 78 goals. Additionally, he has accomplished five hat-tricks, one of which included four goals in a single match against Oman during the 5th Arabian Gulf Cup on 5 April 1979.

== Goals ==
As of match played on 3 March 1990 Iraq scores listed first.
* indicates 27 non-FIFA goals

International goals by cap, date, venue, opponent, score, result and competition
No.	Cap	Date	Venue	Opponent	Result	Competition
1	4	17 July 1977	Stadium Merdeka, Kuala Lumpur	Indonesia	2–0	1977 Merdeka Tournament
2	8	25 July 1977	Stadium Merdeka, Kuala Lumpur	Thailand	5–0	1977 Merdeka Tournament
3	9	28 July 1977	Stadium Merdeka, Kuala Lumpur	South Korea	1–1	1977 Merdeka Tournament
4	12	21 February 1978	Al-Shaab Stadium, Baghdad	Algeria	3–0	Friendly
5	12	21 February 1978	Al-Shaab Stadium, Baghdad	Algeria	3–0	Friendly
6	12	21 February 1978	Al-Shaab Stadium, Baghdad	Algeria	3–0	Friendly
7	14	27 February 1978	Al-Shaab Stadium, Baghdad	North Korea	1–0	Friendly
8	20	20 July 1978	Stadium Merdeka, Kuala Lumpur	Singapore	3–0	1978 Merdeka Tournament
9	20	20 July 1978	Stadium Merdeka, Kuala Lumpur	Singapore	3–0	1978 Merdeka Tournament
10	20	20 July 1978	Stadium Merdeka, Kuala Lumpur	Singapore	3–0	1978 Merdeka Tournament
11	26	12 December 1978	Bangkok	China	2–0	1978 Asian Games
12	29	18 December 1978	Bangkok	Kuwait	3–0	1978 Asian Games
13	30	20 December 1978	Bangkok	India	3–0	1978 Asian Games
14	33	7 February 1979	Al-Shaab Stadium, Baghdad	Finland	2–0	Friendly
15	34	9 February 1979	Al-Shaab Stadium, Baghdad	East Germany	1–1	Friendly
16	35	12 February 1979	Al-Shaab Stadium, Baghdad	East Germany	2–1	Friendly
17	35	12 February 1979	Al-Shaab Stadium, Baghdad	East Germany	2–1	Friendly
18	36	23 March 1979	Al-Shaab Stadium, Baghdad	Bahrain	4–0	5th Arabian Gulf Cup
19	36	23 March 1979	Al-Shaab Stadium, Baghdad	Bahrain	4–0	5th Arabian Gulf Cup
20	36	23 March 1979	Al-Shaab Stadium, Baghdad	Bahrain	4–0	5th Arabian Gulf Cup
21	37	26 March 1979	Al-Shaab Stadium, Baghdad	Qatar	2–0	5th Arabian Gulf Cup
22	37	26 March 1979	Al-Shaab Stadium, Baghdad	Qatar	2–0	5th Arabian Gulf Cup
23	39	3 April 1979	Al-Shaab Stadium, Baghdad	United Arab Emirates	5–0	5th Arabian Gulf Cup
24	40	5 April 1979	Al-Shaab Stadium, Baghdad	Oman	7–0	5th Arabian Gulf Cup
25	40	5 April 1979	Al-Shaab Stadium, Baghdad	Oman	7–0	5th Arabian Gulf Cup
26	40	5 April 1979	Al-Shaab Stadium, Baghdad	Oman	7–0	5th Arabian Gulf Cup
27	40	5 April 1979	Al-Shaab Stadium, Baghdad	Oman	7–0	5th Arabian Gulf Cup
28*	44	16 March 1980	Al-Shaab Stadium, Baghdad	Jordan	4–0	1980 Summer Olympics qualifiers
29*	47	28 March 1980	Al-Shaab Stadium, Baghdad	South Yemen	3–0	1980 Summer Olympics qualifiers
30*	47	28 March 1980	Al-Shaab Stadium, Baghdad	South Yemen	3–0	1980 Summer Olympics qualifiers
31*	50	21 July 1980	Republican Stadium, Kiev	Costa Rica	3–0	1980 Summer Olympics
32	54	8 February 1981	Amman	Jordan	2–0	Friendly
33	55	8 March 1981	Fez	Morocco	1–1	Friendly
34	56	18 March 1981	Riyadh	Qatar	1–0	1982 FIFA World Cup qualifiers
35*	60	4 March 1982	Al-Shaab Stadium, Baghdad	East Germany	1–1	Friendly
36	61	7 March 1982	Al-Shaab Stadium, Baghdad	South Korea	3–0	Friendly
37	62	10 March 1982	Al-Shaab Stadium, Baghdad	South Korea	1–1	Friendly
38*	63	20 March 1982	Zayed Sports City Stadium, Abu Dhabi	Oman	4–0	6th Arabian Gulf Cup
39*	64	22 March 1982	Zayed Sports City Stadium, Abu Dhabi	Bahrain	3–0	6th Arabian Gulf Cup
40*	64	22 March 1982	Zayed Sports City Stadium, Abu Dhabi	Bahrain	3–0	6th Arabian Gulf Cup
41*	65	24 March 1982	Zayed Sports City Stadium, Abu Dhabi	Saudi Arabia	1–2	6th Arabian Gulf Cup
42*	67	30 March 1982	Zayed Sports City Stadium, Abu Dhabi	United Arab Emirates	1–0	6th Arabian Gulf Cup
43	69	21 November 1982	New Delhi	(Myanmar) Burma	4–0	1982 Asian Games
44	70	23 November 1982	New Delhi	Nepal	3–0	1982 Asian Games
45	70	23 November 1982	New Delhi	Nepal	3–0	1982 Asian Games
46	71	3 December 1982	Jawaharlal Nehru Stadium, New Delhi	Kuwait	1–0	1982 Asian Games
47*	78	7 October 1983	Bahrain National Stadium, Manama	Bahrain	2–1	1984 Summer Olympic qualifiers
48	80	27 February 1984	Cairo International Stadium, Cairo	Egypt	2–1	Friendly
49	82	11 March 1984	Royal Oman Police Stadium, Muscat	Oman	2–1	7th Arabian Gulf Cup
50	82	11 March 1984	Royal Oman Police Stadium, Muscat	Oman	2–1	7th Arabian Gulf Cup
51	84	17 March 1984	Royal Oman Police Stadium, Muscat	Saudi Arabia	4–0	7th Arabian Gulf Cup
52	84	17 March 1984	Royal Oman Police Stadium, Muscat	Saudi Arabia	4–0	7th Arabian Gulf Cup
53	84	17 March 1984	Royal Oman Police Stadium, Muscat	Saudi Arabia	4–0	7th Arabian Gulf Cup
54	86	22 March 1984	Royal Oman Police Stadium, Muscat	Kuwait	3–1	7th Arabian Gulf Cup
55	86	22 March 1984	Royal Oman Police Stadium, Muscat	Kuwait	3–1	7th Arabian Gulf Cup
56*	92	26 April 1984	Singapore	Malaysia	2–0	1984 Summer Olympics qualifiers
57*	94	18 May 1984	Amman, Jordan	Jordan	2–3	1985 Arab Nations Cup qualifiers
58*	94	18 May 1984	Amman, Jordan	Jordan	2–3	1985 Arab Nations Cup qualifiers
59*	95	30 July 1984	Harvard Stadium, Boston	Canada	1–1	1984 Summer Olympics
60*	97	3 August 1984	Navy–Marine Corps Memorial Stadium, Annapolis	(Socialist Federal Republic of Yugoslavia) Yugoslavia	2–4	1984 Summer Olympics
61*	98	15 March 1985	Al-Sadaqua Walsalam Stadium, Kuwait City	Lebanon	6–0	1986 FIFA World Cup qualifiers
62*	98	15 March 1985	Al-Sadaqua Walsalam Stadium, Kuwait City	Lebanon	6–0	1986 FIFA World Cup qualifiers
63*	99	18 March 1985	Al-Sadaqua Walsalam Stadium, Kuwait City	Lebanon	6–0	1986 FIFA World Cup qualifiers
64*	99	18 March 1985	Al-Sadaqua Walsalam Stadium, Kuwait City	Lebanon	6–0	1986 FIFA World Cup qualifiers
65	100	29 March 1985	King Abdullah Stadium, Amman	Jordan	3–2	1986 FIFA World Cup qualifiers
66*	102	8 September 1985	King Fahd Stadium, Taif	Saudi Arabia	1–3	Friendly
67	104	20 September 1985	Al-Rashid Stadium, Dubai	United Arab Emirates	3–2	1986 FIFA World Cup qualifiers
68	104	20 September 1985	Al-Rashid Stadium, Dubai	United Arab Emirates	3–2	1986 FIFA World Cup qualifiers
69	108	29 November 1985	King Fahd Stadium, Taif	Syria	3–1	1986 FIFA World Cup qualifiers
70*	110	3 February 1986	Al-Shaab Stadium, Baghdad	Denmark	2–0	Friendly
71	114	21 September 1986	Daegu Stadium, Daegu	Oman	4–0	1986 Asian Games
72	115	25 September 1986	Daegu Stadium, Daegu	United Arab Emirates	1–2	1986 Asian Games
73*	118	8 April 1987	Bahrain National Stadium, Manama	Bahrain	3–1	Friendly
74*	119	17 April 1987	Amman	Jordan	2–1	1988 Summer Olympics qualifiers
75*	119	17 April 1987	Amman	Jordan	2–1	1988 Summer Olympics qualifiers
76*	120	24 April 1987	Kuwait City	Jordan	2–0	1988 Summer Olympics qualifiers
77*	123	11 December 1987	Doha	Qatar	3–1	1988 Summer Olympics qualifiers
78	133	10 February 1989	Al-Shaab Stadium, Baghdad	Qatar	2–2	1990 FIFA World Cup qualifiers

== Hat-tricks ==
No.	Date	Venue	Opponent	Goals	Result	Competition
1	21 February 1978	Al-Shaab Stadium, Baghdad	Algeria	3 – (29', 41', 57')	3–0	Friendly
2	20 July 1978	Stadium Merdeka, Kuala Lumpur	Singapore	3 – (50', 57', 76')	3–0	1978 Merdeka Tournament
3	23 March 1979	Al-Shaab Stadium, Baghdad	Bahrain	3 – (44', 88', 90')	4–0	5th Arabian Gulf Cup
4	5 April 1979	Al-Shaab Stadium, Baghdad	Oman	4 – (30', 32', 40', 86')	7–0	5th Arabian Gulf Cup
5	17 March 1984	Royal Oman Police Stadium, Muscat	Saudi Arabia	3 – (57', 70', 84')	4–0	7th Arabian Gulf Cup

== Statistics ==
Goals by year
National team	Year	Apps	Goals
Iraq	1976	2	0
Iraq	1977	8	3
Iraq	1978	20	10
Iraq	1979	10	14
Iraq	1980	11	4
Iraq	1981	6	3
Iraq	1982	16	12
Iraq	1983	5	1
Iraq	1984	18	13
Iraq	1985	11	9
Iraq	1986	8	3
Iraq	1987	7	5
Iraq	1988	5	0
Iraq	1989	5	1
Iraq	1990	4	0
Total		137	78

Goals by competition
Competition	Goals
Arabian Gulf Cup	22
Friendlies	17
Summer Olympics qualifiers	11
FIFA World Cup qualification	10
Asian Games	9
Merdeka Tournament	6
Summer Olympics	3
Total	78

Goals by opponent
Opponent	Goals
Jordan	8
Oman	8
Bahrain	7
Qatar	5
Saudi Arabia	5
United Arab Emirates	5
East Germany	4
Kuwait	4
Lebanon	4
Algeria	3
Singapore	3
South Korea	3
Nepal	2
South Yemen	2
Burma	1
Canada	1
China	1
Costa Rica	1
Denmark	1
Egypt	1
Finland	1
India	1
Indonesia	1
Malaysia	1
Morocco	1
North Korea	1
Syria	1
Thailand	1
Yugoslavia	1
Total	78

== See also ==
- List of top international men's football goalscorers by country
- List of men's footballers with 50 or more international goals
