= Scotland national football team records and statistics =

This page details Scotland national football team records and statistics; the most capped players, the players with the most goals, and Scotland's match record by opponent and decade.

== Player records ==
=== Most capped players ===
As of Scotland v North Macedonia, 13 November 2026
Players in bold are still active with Scotland.

Rank	Name	Caps	Goals	Scotland career	Clubs (Note: Only clubs played for while receiving caps are listed.)
1	**Andy Robertson**	103	4	2014–present	Dundee United, Hull City, Liverpool, Tottenham Hotspur
2	Kenny Dalglish	102	30		
3	**John McGinn**	94	24	2016–present	St Mirren, Hibernian, Aston Villa
4	Jim Leighton	91	0	1982–1998	Aberdeen, Manchester United, Hibernian
5	Craig Gordon	84	0	2004–2026	Heart of Midlothian, Sunderland, Celtic
6	Darren Fletcher	80	5	2003–2017	Manchester United, West Bromwich Albion, Stoke City
7	Alex McLeish	77	0	1980–1993	Aberdeen
8	Paul McStay	76	9	1983–1997	Celtic
9	**Ryan Christie**	75	11	2017–present	Aberdeen, Celtic, Bournemouth
10	**Scott McTominay**	74	15	2018–present	Manchester United, Napoli

=== Top goalscorers ===
As of Scotland v North Macedonia, 13 November 2026
Players in bold are still active with Scotland.

Rank	Name	Goals	Caps	Average	Scotland career
1=	Denis Law (list)	30	55	0.545	1958–1974
1=	Kenny Dalglish (list)	30	102	0.294	1971–1986
3=	Hughie Gallacher	24	20	1.2	1924–1935
3=	**John McGinn**	24	94	0.255	2016–present
5	Lawrie Reilly	22	38	0.579	1948–1957
6	Ally McCoist	19	61	0.311	1986–1998
7	Kenny Miller	18	69	0.261	2001–2013
8=	Robert Hamilton	15	11	1.364	1899–1911
8=	James McFadden	15	48	0.313	2002–2010
8=	**Scott McTominay**	15	74	0.203	2018–present

=== Hat-tricks ===
Table

Wartime internationals, not regarded as official matches, are not included in the list.

Date	Player	Opponent	Ref
2 March 1878	John McDougall	England	
13 March 1880	George Ker	England	
12 March 1881	John Smith	England	
14 March 1885	Alex Higgins	Ireland	
23 March 1885	Joseph Lindsay	Wales	
20 March 1886	Charles Heggie	Ireland	
24 March 1888	William Dickson	Ireland	
9 March 1889	Willie Groves	Ireland	
22 March 1890	William Paul	Wales	
18 March 1893	John Barker	Wales	
18 March 1893	Jake Madden	Wales	
19 March 1898	James Gillespie	Wales	
18 March 1899	Robert Smyth McColl	Wales	
25 March 1899	Robert Smyth McColl	Ireland	
7 April 1900	Robert Smyth McColl	England	
23 February 1901	Sandy McMahon	Ireland	
23 February 1901	RC Hamilton	Ireland	
1 March 1902	RC Hamilton	Ireland	
14 March 1908	Jimmy Quinn	Ireland	
27 February 1926	Hughie Gallacher	Ireland	
27 February 1928	Alex Jackson	England	
27 October 1928	Hughie Gallacher	Wales	
23 February 1929	Hughie Gallacher	Ireland	
26 May 1929	Alec Cheyne	Norway	
26 May 1932	Neil Dewar	France	
1 October 1949	Henry Morris	Ireland	
1 November 1950	Billy Steel	Northern Ireland	
20 May 1951	George Hamilton	Belgium	
30 April 1952	Lawrie Reilly	United States	
8 May 1957	Jackie Mudie	Spain	
7 October 1961	Alex Scott	Northern Ireland	
7 November 1962	Denis Law	Northern Ireland	
4 June 1963	Denis Law	Norway	
7 November 1963	Denis Law	Norway	
13 June 1967	Joe Harper	Canada Olympic Team	
17 May 1969	Colin Stein	Cyprus	
29 March 2015	Steven Fletcher	Gibraltar	
11 October 2015	Steven Fletcher	Gibraltar	
4 September 2016	Robert Snodgrass	Malta	
20 November 2018	James Forrest	Israel	
12 October 2019	John McGinn	San Marino	
9 June 2025	Ché Adams	Liechtenstein	

== Team records ==
=== Head to head records ===
As of Scotland v North Macedonia, 13 November 2026

Team	Pld	W	D	L	GF	GA	GD	WPCT
Albania	2	2	0	0	6	0	+6	100.00
Argentina	4	1	1	2	3	5	−2	25.00
Armenia	2	2	0	0	6	1	+5	100.00
Australia	8	6	1	1	11	4	+7	75.00
Austria	23	7	8	8	30	37	−7	30.43
Belarus	6	4	1	1	9	3	+6	66.67
Belgium	20	4	3	13	21	41	−20	20.00
Bosnia and Herzegovina	2	2	0	0	3	1	+2	100.00
Bolivia	1	1	0	0	4	0	+4	100.00
Brazil	11	0	2	9	3	19	−16	0.00
Bulgaria	6	3	3	0	10	4	+6	50.00
Canada	6	5	1	0	14	3	+11	83.33
Canada Olympic Team	1	1	0	0	7	2	+5	100.00
Chile	2	2	0	0	6	2	+4	100.00
Colombia	3	0	2	1	2	3	−1	0.00
CIS	1	1	0	0	3	0	+3	100.00
Costa Rica	2	0	0	2	0	2	−2	0.00
Croatia	8	3	3	2	8	7	+1	37.50
Curaçao	1	1	0	0	4	1	+3	100.00
Cyprus	9	9	0	0	30	6	+24	100.00
Czech Republic	10	4	1	5	11	14	−3	40.00
Czechoslovakia	10	5	1	4	18	16	+2	50.00
Denmark	20	12	1	7	26	16	+10	60.00
East Germany	6	2	1	3	6	4	+2	33.33
Ecuador	1	1	0	0	2	1	+1	100.00
Egypt	1	0	0	1	1	3	−2	0.00
England	116	41	26	49	175	206	−31	35.34
Estonia	8	6	2	0	13	3	+10	75.00
Faroe Islands	11	9	2	0	31	6	+25	81.82
Finland	9	6	3	0	20	7	+13	66.67
France	17	8	0	9	16	27	−11	47.06
Georgia	6	3	1	2	7	6	+1	50.00
Germany	10	2	2	6	10	17	−7	20.00
Gibraltar	3	3	0	0	14	1	+13	100.00
Greece	6	3	0	3	7	8	−1	50.00
Haiti	1	1	0	0	1	0	+1	100.00
Hong Kong League XI	1	1	0	0	4	0	+4	100.00
Hungary	10	3	2	5	14	19	−5	30.00
Iceland	7	6	0	1	13	6	+7	85.71
Iran	1	0	1	0	1	1	0	0.00
Ireland	55	43	6	6	185	47	+138	78.18
Israel	11	6	3	2	16	11	+5	54.55
Italy	11	1	2	8	4	19	−15	9.09
Ivory Coast	1	0	0	1	0	1	−1	0.00
Japan	4	0	2	2	0	3	−3	0.00
Kazakhstan	2	1	0	1	3	4	−1	50.00
Latvia	4	4	0	0	7	1	+6	100.00
Liechtenstein	3	3	0	0	7	1	+6	100.00
Lithuania	10	6	3	1	14	4	+10	60.00
Luxembourg	5	4	1	0	12	1	+11	80.00
Malta	7	6	1	0	18	5	+13	85.71
Mexico	1	0	0	1	0	1	−1	0.00
Moldova	4	3	1	0	6	1	+5	75.00
Morocco	2	0	0	2	0	4	−4	0.00
Netherlands	21	6	5	10	17	32	−15	28.57
New Zealand	2	1	1	0	6	3	+3	50.00
Nigeria	2	0	1	1	3	4	−1	0.00
North Macedonia	6	4	1	1	9	4	+5	66.67
Northern Ireland	41	20	11	10	73	35	+38	48.78
Norway	20	10	7	3	39	25	+14	50.00
Paraguay	1	0	0	1	2	3	−1	0.00
Peru	4	1	1	2	4	6	−2	25.00
Poland	13	3	6	4	18	19	−1	23.08
Portugal	17	4	4	9	15	23	−8	23.53
Qatar	1	1	0	0	1	0	+1	100.00
Republic of Ireland	13	5	3	5	14	13	+1	38.46
Romania	6	2	2	2	8	6	+2	33.33
Russia	4	0	2	2	2	7	−5	0.00
San Marino	8	8	0	0	27	0	+27	100.00
Saudi Arabia	1	0	1	0	2	2	0	0.00
Serbia	3	0	2	1	1	3	−2	0.00
Slovakia	4	2	0	2	2	4	−2	50.00
Slovenia	7	2	4	1	8	5	+3	28.57
South Africa	2	1	0	1	1	2	−1	50.00
South Korea	1	0	0	1	1	4	−3	0.00
Soviet Union	4	0	1	3	2	6	−4	0.00
Spain	15	4	4	7	22	25	−3	26.67
Sweden	12	5	1	6	14	19	−5	41.67
Switzerland	18	8	4	6	27	28	−1	44.44
Trinidad and Tobago	1	1	0	0	4	1	+3	100.00
Turkey	2	0	0	2	3	6	−3	0.00
Ukraine	5	2	1	2	7	6	+1	40.00
United States	7	2	3	2	10	8	+2	28.57
Uruguay	4	1	1	2	4	10	−6	25.00
Wales	107	61	23	23	243	124	+119	57.01
West Germany	8	2	3	3	14	14	0	25.00
Yugoslavia	8	2	5	1	16	11	+5	25.00
Zaire	1	1	0	0	2	0	+2	100.00
Total	861	406	184	271	1463	1063	+400	47.15

Source: Results

Statistics include official FIFA recognised matches, five matches from a 1967 overseas tour that were reclassified as full internationals in 2021, and a match against a Hong Kong League XI played on 23 May 2002 that the Scottish Football Association includes in its statistical totals.

=== By period ===
As of Scotland v North Macedonia, 13 November 2026

Period	Pld	W	D	L	GF	GA	GD	W%
1872–1914	113	71	23	19	341	137	+204	62.83
1920–1939	75	46	12	17	160	95	+65	61.33
1940–1959	86	39	19	28	162	130	+32	45.35
1960–1979	158	70	33	55	266	217	+49	44.30
1980–1999	179	76	46	57	213	167	+46	42.46
2000–2019	172	70	34	68	213	222	−9	40.70
2020–present	78	34	17	27	108	95	+13	43.59
Totals	861	406	184	271	1,463	1,063	+400	47.15

Statistics include official FIFA recognised matches, five matches from a 1967 overseas tour that were reclassified as full internationals in 2021, and a match against a Hong Kong League XI played on 23 May 2002 that the Scottish Football Association includes in its statistical totals.
