= List of international goals scored by Robert Lewandowski =

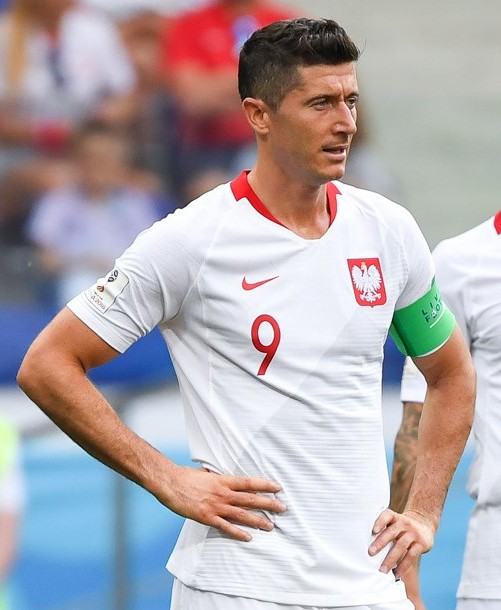
Lewandowski (pictured in 2018) has scored 92 goals for Poland since his debut in 2008

Robert Lewandowski is a Polish professional footballer who has represented the Poland national football team as a forward since his debut in 2008. During his international career, Lewandowski has scored 92 goals in 172 international appearances, making him the country's all-time top scorer. On 5 October 2017, Lewandowski scored a hat-trick in a 6–1 win over Armenia to take his tally to 50 goals for Poland, surpassing the previous record of 48 goals set by Włodzimierz Lubański to become the all-time top scorer for Poland. Lewandowski made his debut for Poland on 10 September 2008, three weeks after his 20th birthday, against San Marino where he came on as a substitute and scored a goal in a 2–0 away win in 2010 FIFA World Cup qualification. Only Włodzimierz Lubański scored a goal on his debut for the national team at a younger age than Lewandowski, having been 16 at the time. Lewandowski scored another qualifying goal against the same team on 1 April 2009, in a 10–0 victory.

On 7 September 2014, in Poland's first UEFA Euro 2016 qualifier, away against Gibraltar, Lewandowski scored his first international hat-trick, netting four goals in a 7–0 win. He has scored seven international hat-tricks, and on one occasion, four international goals in a single match. Out of all his opponents, he has scored the most against Romania, netting eight goals against the nation.

== International goals ==
As of 17 November 2026

Scores and results list Poland's goal tally first, score column indicates score after each Lewandowski goal.

Table key
‡	Indicates goal was scored from a penalty kick
	Indicates Poland won the match
	Indicates the match ended in a draw
	Indicates Poland lost the match

List of international goals scored by Robert Lewandowski
No.	Cap	Date	Venue	Opponent	Score	Result	Competition	Ref.
1	1	10 September 2008	San Marino Stadium, Serravalle, San Marino	San Marino	2–0	2–0	2010 FIFA World Cup qualification	
2	4	19 November 2008	Croke Park, Dublin, Republic of Ireland	Republic of Ireland	3–1	3–2	Friendly	
3	7	1 April 2009	Kolporter Arena, Kielce, Poland	San Marino	4–0	10–0	2010 FIFA World Cup qualification	
4	19	23 January 2010	80th Birthday Stadium, Korat, Thailand	Singapore	1–0‡	6–1	2010 King's Cup	
5	19	23 January 2010	80th Birthday Stadium, Korat, Thailand	Singapore	2–0	6–1	2010 King's Cup	
6	20	3 March 2010	Kazimierz Sosnkowski Stadium, Warsaw, Poland	Bulgaria	2–0	2–0	Friendly	
7	26	7 September 2010	Henryk Reyman Municipal Stadium, Kraków, Poland	Australia	1–1	1–2	Friendly	
8	29	17 November 2010	Poznań Stadium, Poznań, Poland	Ivory Coast	1–0	3–1	Friendly	
9	29	17 November 2010	Poznań Stadium, Poznań, Poland	Ivory Coast	3–1	3–1	Friendly	
10	30	9 February 2011	Estádio Algarve, Faro/Loulé, Portugal	Norway	1–0	1–0	Friendly	
11	36	6 September 2011	Gdańsk Stadium, Gdańsk, Poland	Germany	1–0	2–2	Friendly	
12	37	7 October 2011	Seoul World Cup Stadium, Seoul, South Korea (Note: Not officially recognised by FIFA as a Tier 1 International Match.)	South Korea	1–0	2–2	Friendly	
13	38	11 October 2011	Brita-Arena, Wiesbaden, Germany	Belarus	2–0	2–0	Friendly	
14	42	2 June 2012	Polish Army Stadium, Warsaw, Poland	Andorra	2–0	4–0	Friendly	
15	43	8 June 2012	Stadion Narodowy, Warsaw, Poland	Greece	1–0	1–1	UEFA Euro 2012	
16	53	26 March 2013	Stadion Narodowy, Warsaw, Poland	San Marino	1–0‡	5–0	2014 FIFA World Cup qualification	
17	53	26 March 2013	Stadion Narodowy, Warsaw, Poland	San Marino	3–0‡	5–0	2014 FIFA World Cup qualification	
18	56	6 September 2013	Stadion Narodowy, Warsaw, Poland	Montenegro	1–1	1–1	2014 FIFA World Cup qualification	
19	61	6 June 2014	Gdańsk Stadium, Gdańsk, Poland	Lithuania	2–1‡	2–1	Friendly	
20	62	7 September 2014	Estádio Algarve, Faro/Loulé, Portugal (Note: Not officially recognised by FIFA as a Tier 1 International Match, but was an official UEFA match.)	Gibraltar	3–0	7–0	UEFA Euro 2016 qualifying	
21	62	7 September 2014	Estádio Algarve, Faro/Loulé, Portugal	Gibraltar	4–0	7–0	UEFA Euro 2016 qualifying	
22	62	7 September 2014	Estádio Algarve, Faro/Loulé, Portugal	Gibraltar	6–0	7–0	UEFA Euro 2016 qualifying	
23	62	7 September 2014	Estádio Algarve, Faro/Loulé, Portugal	Gibraltar	7–0	7–0	UEFA Euro 2016 qualifying	
24	68	13 June 2015	Stadion Narodowy, Warsaw, Poland	Georgia	2–0	4–0	UEFA Euro 2016 qualifying	
25	68	13 June 2015	Stadion Narodowy, Warsaw, Poland	Georgia	3–0	4–0	UEFA Euro 2016 qualifying	
26	68	13 June 2015	Stadion Narodowy, Warsaw, Poland	Georgia	4–0	4–0	UEFA Euro 2016 qualifying	
27	69	4 September 2015	Commerzbank-Arena, Frankfurt, Germany	Germany	1–2	1–3	UEFA Euro 2016 qualifying	
28	70	7 September 2015	Stadion Narodowy, Warsaw, Poland	Gibraltar	3–0	8–1	UEFA Euro 2016 qualifying	
29	70	7 September 2015	Stadion Narodowy, Warsaw, Poland	Gibraltar	4–0	8–1	UEFA Euro 2016 qualifying	
30	71	8 October 2015	Hampden Park, Glasgow, Scotland	Scotland	1–0	2–2	UEFA Euro 2016 qualifying	
31	71	8 October 2015	Hampden Park, Glasgow, Scotland	Scotland	2–2	2–2	UEFA Euro 2016 qualifying	
32	72	11 October 2015	Stadion Narodowy, Warsaw, Poland	Republic of Ireland	2–1	2–1	UEFA Euro 2016 qualifying	
33	73	13 November 2015	Stadion Narodowy, Warsaw, Poland	Iceland	3–2	4–2	Friendly	
34	73	13 November 2015	Stadion Narodowy, Warsaw, Poland	Iceland	4–2	4–2	Friendly	
35	81	30 June 2016	Stade Vélodrome, Marseille, France	Portugal	1–0	1–1 (a.e.t.) (3–5 p)	UEFA Euro 2016	
36	82	4 September 2016	Astana Arena, Astana, Kazakhstan	Kazakhstan	2–0‡	2–2	2018 FIFA World Cup qualification	
37	83	8 October 2016	Stadion Narodowy, Warsaw, Poland	Denmark	1–0	3–2	2018 FIFA World Cup qualification	
38	83	8 October 2016	Stadion Narodowy, Warsaw, Poland	Denmark	2–0‡	3–2	2018 FIFA World Cup qualification	
39	83	8 October 2016	Stadion Narodowy, Warsaw, Poland	Denmark	3–0	3–2	2018 FIFA World Cup qualification	
40	84	11 October 2016	Stadion Narodowy, Warsaw, Poland	Armenia	2–1	2–1	2018 FIFA World Cup qualification	
41	85	11 November 2016	Arena Națională, Bucharest, Romania	Romania	2–0	3–0	2018 FIFA World Cup qualification	
42	85	11 November 2016	Arena Națională, Bucharest, Romania	Romania	3–0‡	3–0	2018 FIFA World Cup qualification	
43	86	26 March 2017	Podgorica City Stadium, Podgorica, Montenegro	Montenegro	1–0	2–1	2018 FIFA World Cup qualification	
44	87	10 June 2017	Stadion Narodowy, Warsaw, Poland	Romania	1–0‡	3–1	2018 FIFA World Cup qualification	
45	87	10 June 2017	Stadion Narodowy, Warsaw, Poland	Romania	2–0	3–1	2018 FIFA World Cup qualification	
46	87	10 June 2017	Stadion Narodowy, Warsaw, Poland	Romania	3–0‡	3–1	2018 FIFA World Cup qualification	
47	89	4 September 2017	Stadion Narodowy, Warsaw, Poland	Kazakhstan	3–0‡	3–0	2018 FIFA World Cup qualification	
48	90	5 October 2017	Vazgen Sargsyan Republican Stadium, Yerevan, Armenia	Armenia	2–0	6–1	2018 FIFA World Cup qualification	
49	90	5 October 2017	Vazgen Sargsyan Republican Stadium, Yerevan, Armenia	Armenia	3–0	6–1	2018 FIFA World Cup qualification	
50	90	5 October 2017	Vazgen Sargsyan Republican Stadium, Yerevan, Armenia	Armenia	5–1	6–1	2018 FIFA World Cup qualification	
51	91	8 October 2017	Stadion Narodowy, Warsaw, Poland	Montenegro	3–2	4–2	2018 FIFA World Cup qualification	
52	93	27 March 2018	Silesian Stadium, Chorzów, Poland	South Korea	1–0	3–2	Friendly	
53	94	8 June 2018	Poznań Stadium, Poznań, Poland	Chile	1–0	2–2	Friendly	
54	95	12 June 2018	Stadion Narodowy, Warsaw, Poland	Lithuania	1–0	4–0	Friendly	
55	95	12 June 2018	Stadion Narodowy, Warsaw, Poland	Lithuania	2–0	4–0	Friendly	
56	104	24 March 2019	Stadion Narodowy, Warsaw, Poland	Latvia	1–0	2–0	UEFA Euro 2020 qualifying	
57	106	10 June 2019	Stadion Narodowy, Warsaw, Poland	Israel	2–0‡	4–0	UEFA Euro 2020 qualifying	
58	109	10 October 2019	Daugava Stadium, Riga, Latvia	Latvia	1–0	3–0	UEFA Euro 2020 qualifying	
59	109	10 October 2019	Daugava Stadium, Riga, Latvia	Latvia	2–0	3–0	UEFA Euro 2020 qualifying	
60	109	10 October 2019	Daugava Stadium, Riga, Latvia	Latvia	3–0	3–0	UEFA Euro 2020 qualifying	
61	112	19 November 2019	Stadion Narodowy, Warsaw, Poland	Slovenia	2–1	3–2	UEFA Euro 2020 qualifying	
62	114	14 October 2020	Wrocław Stadium, Wrocław, Poland	Bosnia and Herzegovina	1–0	3–0	2020–21 UEFA Nations League A	
63	114	14 October 2020	Wrocław Stadium, Wrocław, Poland	Bosnia and Herzegovina	3–0	3–0	2020–21 UEFA Nations League A	
64	117	25 March 2021	Puskás Aréna, Budapest, Hungary	Hungary	3–3	3–3	2022 FIFA World Cup qualification	
65	118	28 March 2021	Polish Army Stadium, Warsaw, Poland	Andorra	1–0	3–0	2022 FIFA World Cup qualification	
66	118	28 March 2021	Polish Army Stadium, Warsaw, Poland	Andorra	2–0	3–0	2022 FIFA World Cup qualification	
67	121	19 June 2021	La Cartuja, Seville, Spain	Spain	1–1	1–1	UEFA Euro 2020	
68	122	23 June 2021	Krestovsky Stadium, Saint Petersburg, Russia	Sweden	1–2	2–3	UEFA Euro 2020	
69	122	23 June 2021	Krestovsky Stadium, Saint Petersburg, Russia	Sweden	2–2	2–3	UEFA Euro 2020	
70	123	2 September 2021	Stadion Narodowy, Warsaw, Poland	Albania	1–0	4–1	2022 FIFA World Cup qualification	
71	124	5 September 2021	San Marino Stadium, Serravalle, San Marino	San Marino	1–0	7–1	2022 FIFA World Cup qualification	
72	124	5 September 2021	San Marino Stadium, Serravalle, San Marino	San Marino	3–0	7–1	2022 FIFA World Cup qualification	
73	128	12 November 2021	Estadi Nacional, Andorra La Vella, Andorra	Andorra	1–0	4–1	2022 FIFA World Cup qualification	
74	128	12 November 2021	Estadi Nacional, Andorra La Vella, Andorra	Andorra	4–1	4–1	2022 FIFA World Cup qualification	
75	129	29 March 2022	Silesian Stadium, Chorzów, Poland	Sweden	1–0‡	2–0	2022 FIFA World Cup qualification	
76	131	8 June 2022	King Baudouin Stadium, Brussels, Belgium	Belgium	1–0	1–6	2022–23 UEFA Nations League A	
77	136	26 November 2022	Education City Stadium, Al Rayyan, Qatar	Saudi Arabia	2–0	2–0	2022 FIFA World Cup	
78	138	4 December 2022	Al Thumama Stadium, Doha, Qatar	France	1–3‡	1–3	2022 FIFA World Cup	
79	142	20 June 2023	Zimbru Stadium, Chișinău, Moldova	Moldova	2–0	2–3	UEFA Euro 2024 qualifying	
80	143	7 September 2023	Stadion Narodowy, Warsaw, Poland	Faroe Islands	1–0‡	2–0	UEFA Euro 2024 qualifying	
81	143	7 September 2023	Stadion Narodowy, Warsaw, Poland	Faroe Islands	2–0	2–0	UEFA Euro 2024 qualifying	
82	146	21 November 2023	Stadion Narodowy, Warsaw, Poland	Latvia	2–0	2–0	Friendly	
83	152	25 June 2024	Westfalenstadion, Dortmund, Germany	France	1–1‡	1–1	UEFA Euro 2024	
84	153	5 September 2024	Hampden Park, Glasgow, Scotland	Scotland	2–0‡	3–2	2024–25 UEFA Nations League A	
85	157	21 March 2025	Stadion Narodowy, Warsaw, Poland	Lithuania	1–0	1–0	2026 FIFA World Cup qualification	
86	160	7 September 2025	Silesian Stadium, Chorzów, Poland	Finland	2–0	3–1	2026 FIFA World Cup qualification	
87	161	12 October 2025	Darius and Girėnas Stadium, Kaunas, Lithuania	Lithuania	2–0	2–0	2026 FIFA World Cup qualification	
88	163	17 November 2025	National Stadium, Ta' Qali, Malta	Malta	1–0	3–2	2026 FIFA World Cup qualification	
89	164	26 March 2026	Stadion Narodowy, Warsaw, Poland	Albania	1–1	2–1	2026 FIFA World Cup qualification	
90	170	2 October 2026	Stadion Narodowy, Warsaw, Poland	Romania	1–0‡	6–0	2026–27 UEFA Nations League B	
91	170	2 October 2026	Stadion Narodowy, Warsaw, Poland	Romania	2–0	6–0	2026–27 UEFA Nations League B	
92	170	2 October 2026	Stadion Narodowy, Warsaw, Poland	Romania	6–0	6–0	2026–27 UEFA Nations League B	

== Hat-tricks ==
No.	Opponent	Goals	Score	Venue	Competition	Date
1	Gibraltar	4 – (3–0', 4–0', 6–0', 7–0')	7–0	Estádio Algarve, Faro/Loulé, Portugal	UEFA Euro 2016 qualifying	7 September 2014
2	Georgia	3 – (2–0', 3–0', 4–0')	4–0	Stadion Narodowy, Warsaw, Poland	UEFA Euro 2016 qualifying	13 June 2015
3	Denmark	3 – (1–0', 2–0', 3–0')	3–2	Stadion Narodowy, Warsaw, Poland	2018 FIFA World Cup qualification	8 October 2016
4	Romania	3 – (1–0', 2–0', 3–0')	3–1	Stadion Narodowy, Warsaw, Poland	2018 FIFA World Cup qualification	10 June 2017
5	Armenia	3 – (2–0', 3–0', 5–1')	6–1	Vazgen Sargsyan Republican Stadium, Yerevan, Armenia	2018 FIFA World Cup qualification	5 October 2017
6	Latvia	3 – (1–0', 2–0', 3–0')	3–0	Daugava Stadium, Riga, Latvia	UEFA Euro 2020 qualifying	10 October 2019
7	Romania	3 – (1–0', 2–0', 6–0')	6–0	Stadion Narodowy, Warsaw, Poland	2026–27 UEFA Nations League B	2 October 2026

== Statistics ==
As of match played 17 November 2026

Appearances and goals by year
Year	Apps	Goals
2008	4	2
2009	12	1
2010	13	6
2011	11	4
2012	10	2
2013	10	3
2014	6	5
2015	7	11
2016	12	8
2017	6	9
2018	11	4
2019	10	6
2020	4	2
2021	12	11
2022	10	4
2023	8	4
2024	10	2
2025	7	4
2026	9	4
Total	172	92

Caps and goals by competition
Competition	Caps	Goals
Friendlies	54	18
UEFA Euro qualifying	28	22
UEFA European Championship	13	6
UEFA Nations League	21	7
FIFA World Cup qualification	46	35
FIFA World Cup	7	2
King's Cup	3	2
Total	172	92

Goals by opponent
Opponent	Goals
Romania	8
Gibraltar	6
San Marino	6
Andorra	5
Latvia	5
Lithuania	5
Armenia	4
Denmark	3
Georgia	3
Montenegro	3
Scotland	3
Sweden	3
Albania	2
Bosnia and Herzegovina	2
Faroe Islands	2
France	2
Germany	2
Iceland	2
Ivory Coast	2
Kazakhstan	2
Republic of Ireland	2
Singapore	2
South Korea	2
Australia	1
Belarus	1
Belgium	1
Bulgaria	1
Chile	1
Finland	1
Greece	1
Hungary	1
Israel	1
Malta	1
Moldova	1
Norway	1
Portugal	1
Saudi Arabia	1
Slovenia	1
Spain	1
Total	92

Appearances and goals by manager
Manager	Apps	Goals
Leo Beenhakker	12	3
Stefan Majewski	2	0
Franciszek Smuda	31	12
Waldemar Fornalik	13	3
Adam Nawałka	40	37
Jerzy Brzęczek	18	8
Paulo Sousa	12	11
Czesław Michniewicz	10	4
Fernando Santos	6	3
Michał Probierz	14	4
Jan Urban	14	7
Total	172	92

Appearances and goals by club
Club	Apps	Goals
(Poland) Lech Poznań	23	6
(Germany) Borussia Dortmund	38	13
(Germany) Bayern Munich	71	57
(Spain) Barcelona	35	13
(United States) Chicago Fire	5	3
Total	172	92

== See also ==
- List of top international men's football goalscorers by country
- List of men's footballers with 100 or more international caps
- List of men's footballers with 50 or more international goals
