= List of international goals scored by Didier Drogba =

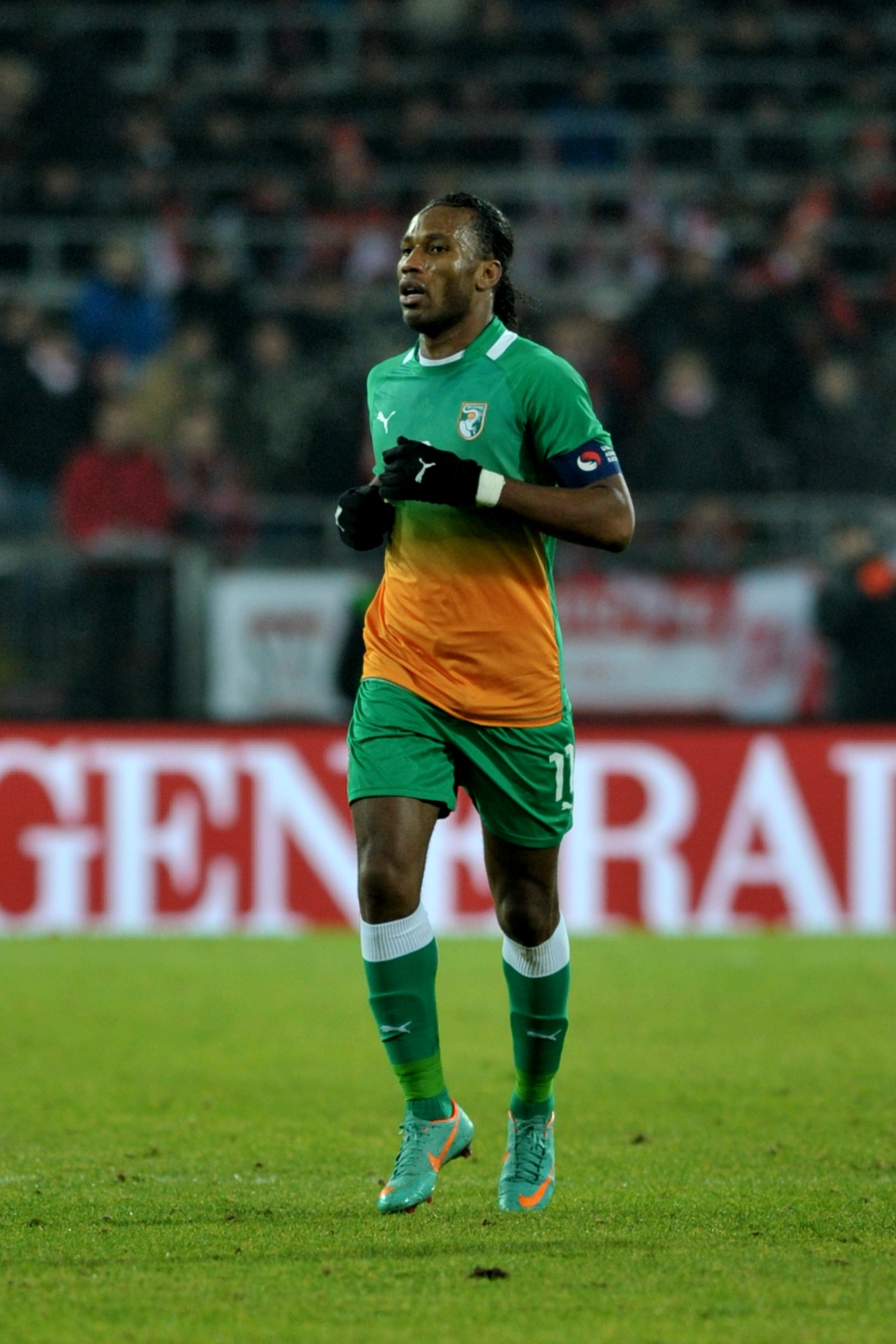
Drogba playing against Austria in 2012, against whom he scored

Didier Drogba is an Ivorian former professional footballer who represented the Ivory Coast national team from 2002 to 2014. He made his debut for the Ivory Coast in a 2004 African Cup of Nations qualification match against South Africa in September 2002. He scored his first international goal on his next appearance for the Ivory Coast, in a 3–0 win against Cameroon in a friendly in Châteauroux, France. On 8 August 2014, Drogba announced his retirement from international football with a record of 65 goals in 105 appearances, ending his international career as his country's all-time top scorer, remaining so as of November 2018, and with the third-most appearances, behind Didier Zokora (123) and Kolo Touré (120).

Drogba scored one hat-trick during his international career, scoring the opening three goals in a 6–1 victory for the Ivory Coast against Burundi in a 2004 African Cup of Nations qualification match. He has also scored a goal twice in a match on twelve occasions, including one against Senegal in October 2012; the game was abandoned shortly after Drogba's second goal as fans rioted, throwing food and drinks onto the pitch, although the Confederation of African Football declared the 2–0 victory would stand. He has scored more goals against Benin (seven) than any other country. Nineteen of his goals were scored in his hometown stadium of Stade Félix Houphouët-Boigny in Abidjan. Fourteen of Drogba's goals were scored from the penalty spot.

Drogba scored more international goals in friendlies than in any other format, with 23 in 42 matches. He scored eighteen goals in FIFA World Cup qualifiers at almost one goal per game (nineteen matches), and two goals at the World Cup finals. In the Africa Cup of Nations, he scored eleven goals in twelve qualifying matches, and eleven goals in twenty-four matches at the tournaments. As of September 2020, he is the 22nd highest men's international goal scorer of all time, and third highest scorer for an African nation, behind Godfrey Chitalu and Kinnah Phiri.

== Goals ==
Ivory Coast listed first, score column indicates score after each Drogba goal.

Table key
| ‡ | Indicates goal was scored from a penalty kick |
| | Indicates Ivory Coast won the match |
| | Indicates the match ended in a draw |
| | Indicates Ivory Coast lost the match |

| No. | Cap | Date | Venue | Opponent | Score | Result | Competition | Ref. |
|---|---|---|---|---|---|---|---|---|
| 1 | 2 | 11 February 2003 | Stade Gaston-Petit, Châteauroux, France | Cameroon | 2–0 | 3–0 | Friendly | |
| 2 | 5 | 8 June 2003 | Stade Félix Houphouët-Boigny, Abidjan, Ivory Coast | Burundi | 1–0 | 6–1 | 2004 African Cup of Nations qualification | |
| 3 | 5 | 8 June 2003 | Stade Félix Houphouët-Boigny, Abidjan, Ivory Coast | Burundi | 2–0 | 6–1 | 2004 African Cup of Nations qualification | |
| 4 | 5 | 8 June 2003 | Stade Félix Houphouët-Boigny, Abidjan, Ivory Coast | Burundi | 3–0 | 6–1 | 2004 African Cup of Nations qualification | |
| 5 | 9 | 31 March 2004 | Stade Olympique de Radès, Radès, Tunisia | Tunisia | 1–0 | 2–0 | Friendly | |
| 6 | 9 | 31 March 2004 | Stade Olympique de Radès, Radès, Tunisia | Tunisia | 2–0 | 2–0 | Friendly | |
| 7 | 10 | 28 April 2004 | Stade Jacques-Forestier, Aix-les-Bains, France | Guinea | 1–0 | 4–2 | Friendly | |
| 8 | 11 | 6 June 2004 | Stade Félix Houphouët-Boigny, Abidjan, Ivory Coast | Libya | 2–0‡ | 2–0 | 2006 FIFA World Cup qualification | |
| 9 | 12 | 20 June 2004 | Alexandria Stadium, Alexandria, Egypt | Egypt | 2–1 | 2–1 | 2006 FIFA World Cup qualification | |
| 10 | 15 | 5 September 2004 | Stade Félix Houphouët-Boigny, Abidjan, Ivory Coast | Sudan | 1–0‡ | 5–0 | 2006 FIFA World Cup qualification | |
| 11 | 16 | 27 March 2005 | Stade Félix Houphouët-Boigny, Abidjan, Ivory Coast | Benin | 2–0 | 3–0 | 2006 FIFA World Cup qualification | |
| 12 | 16 | 27 March 2005 | Stade Félix Houphouët-Boigny, Abidjan, Ivory Coast | Benin | 3–0 | 3–0 | 2006 FIFA World Cup qualification | |
| 13 | 18 | 19 June 2005 | Stade Félix Houphouët-Boigny, Abidjan, Ivory Coast | Egypt | 1–0 | 2–0 | 2006 FIFA World Cup qualification | |
| 14 | 18 | 19 June 2005 | Stade Félix Houphouët-Boigny, Abidjan, Ivory Coast | Egypt | 2–0 | 2–0 | 2006 FIFA World Cup qualification | |
| 15 | 20 | 4 September 2005 | Stade Félix Houphouët-Boigny, Abidjan, Ivory Coast | Cameroon | 1–1 | 2–3 | 2006 FIFA World Cup qualification | |
| 16 | 20 | 4 September 2005 | Stade Félix Houphouët-Boigny, Abidjan, Ivory Coast | Cameroon | 2–2 | 2–3 | 2006 FIFA World Cup qualification | |
| 17 | 23 | 16 November 2005 | Stade de Genève, Geneva, Switzerland | Italy | 1–0 | 1–1 | Friendly | |
| 18 | 24 | 17 January 2006 | Zayed Sports City Stadium, Abu Dhabi, United Arab Emirates | Jordan | 1–0 | 2–0 | Friendly | |
| 19 | 25 | 21 January 2006 | Cairo International Stadium, Cairo, Egypt | Morocco | 1–0‡ | 1–0 | 2006 Africa Cup of Nations | |
| 20 | 26 | 24 January 2006 | Cairo International Stadium, Cairo, Egypt | Libya | 1–0 | 2–1 | 2006 Africa Cup of Nations | |
| 21 | 28 | 7 February 2006 | Haras El Hodoud Stadium, Alexandria, Egypt | Nigeria | 1–0 | 1–0 | 2006 Africa Cup of Nations | |
| 22 | 33 | 4 June 2006 | Stade Robert Bobin, Évry, France | Slovenia | 1–0 | 3–0 | Friendly | |
| 23 | 33 | 4 June 2006 | Stade Robert Bobin, Évry, France | Slovenia | 2–0 | 3–0 | Friendly | |
| 24 | 34 | 10 June 2006 | AOL Arena, Hamburg, Germany | Argentina | 1–2 | 1–2 | 2006 FIFA World Cup | |
| 25 | 38 | 15 November 2006 | Stade Léon-Bollée, Le Mans, France | Sweden | 1–0 | 1–0 | Friendly | |
| 26 | 39 | 6 February 2007 | Stade Robert Diochon, Rouen, France | Guinea | 1–0 | 1–0 | Friendly | |
| 27 | 42 | 3 June 2007 | Stade Bouaké, Bouaké, Ivory Coast | Madagascar | 5–0 | 5–0 | 2008 Africa Cup of Nations qualification | |
| 28 | 44 | 17 October 2007 | Tivoli-Neu, Innsbruck, Austria | Austria | 1–1 | 2–3 | Friendly | |
| 29 | 44 | 17 October 2007 | Tivoli-Neu, Innsbruck, Austria | Austria | 2–3‡ | 2–3 | Friendly | |
| 30 | 47 | 12 January 2008 | Al-Sadaqua Walsalam Stadium, Kuwait City, Kuwait | Kuwait | 2–0 | 2–0 | Friendly | |
| 31 | 49 | 25 January 2008 | Sekondi-Takoradi Stadium, Sekondi-Takoradi, Ghana | Benin | 1–0 | 4–1 | 2008 Africa Cup of Nations | |
| 32 | 50 | 29 January 2008 | Ohene Djan Stadium, Accra, Ghana | Mali | 1–0 | 3–0 | 2008 Africa Cup of Nations | |
| 33 | 51 | 3 February 2008 | Sekondi-Takoradi Stadium, Sekondi-Takoradi, Ghana | Guinea | 2–0 | 5–0 | 2008 Africa Cup of Nations | |
| 34 | 55 | 11 February 2009 | İzmir Atatürk Stadium, İzmir, Turkey | Turkey | 1–1 | 1–1 | Friendly | |
| 35 | 56 | 28 March 2009 | Stade Félix Houphouët-Boigny, Abidjan, Ivory Coast | Malawi | 2–0‡ | 5–0 | 2010 FIFA World Cup qualification | |
| 36 | 56 | 28 March 2009 | Stade Félix Houphouët-Boigny, Abidjan, Ivory Coast | Malawi | 3–0 | 5–0 | 2010 FIFA World Cup qualification | |
| 37 | 58 | 20 June 2009 | Stade du 4 Août, Ouagadougou, Burkina Faso | Burkina Faso | 3–2 | 3–2 | 2010 FIFA World Cup qualification | |
| 38 | 59 | 5 September 2009 | Stade Félix Houphouët-Boigny, Abidjan, Ivory Coast | Burkina Faso | 2–0 | 5–0 | 2010 FIFA World Cup qualification | |
| 39 | 59 | 5 September 2009 | Stade Félix Houphouët-Boigny, Abidjan, Ivory Coast | Burkina Faso | 4–0 | 5–0 | 2010 FIFA World Cup qualification | |
| 40 | 60 | 10 October 2009 | Kamuzu Stadium, Blantyre, Malawi | Malawi | 1–1 | 1–1 | 2010 FIFA World Cup qualification | |
| 41 | 61 | 4 January 2010 | National Stadium, Dar es Salaam, Tanzania | Tanzania | 1–0 | 1–0 | Friendly | |
| 42 | 64 | 15 January 2010 | Estádio Nacional do Chiazi, Cabinda, Angola | Ghana | 3–0 | 3–1 | 2010 Africa Cup of Nations | |
| 43 | 67 | 30 May 2010 | Stade Joseph-Moynat, Thonon-les-Bains, France | Paraguay | 1–0 | 2–2 | Friendly | |
| 44 | 70 | 20 June 2010 | Soccer City, Johannesburg, South Africa | Brazil | 1–3 | 1–3 | 2010 FIFA World Cup | |
| 45 | 73 | 27 March 2011 | Ohene Djan Stadium, Accra, Ghana | Benin | 1–1 | 2–1 | 2012 Africa Cup of Nations qualification | |
| 46 | 73 | 27 March 2011 | Ohene Djan Stadium, Accra, Ghana | Benin | 2–1 | 2–1 | 2012 Africa Cup of Nations qualification | |
| 47 | 74 | 5 June 2011 | Stade de l'Amitié, Cotonou, Benin | Benin | 2–0‡ | 6–2 | 2012 Africa Cup of Nations qualification | |
| 48 | 74 | 5 June 2011 | Stade de l'Amitié, Cotonou, Benin | Benin | 4–2‡ | 6–2 | 2012 Africa Cup of Nations qualification | |
| 49 | 75 | 10 August 2011 | Stade de Genève, Geneva, Switzerland | Israel | 4–2‡ | 4–3 | Friendly | |
| 50 | 77 | 13 January 2012 | Zayed Sports City Stadium, Abu Dhabi, United Arab Emirates | Tunisia | 2–0‡ | 2–0 | Friendly | |
| 51 | 79 | 22 January 2012 | Nuevo Estadio de Malabo, Malabo, Equatorial Guinea | Sudan | 1–0 | 1–0 | 2012 Africa Cup of Nations | |
| 52 | 82 | 4 February 2012 | Nuevo Estadio de Malabo, Malabo, Equatorial Guinea | Equatorial Guinea | 1–0 | 3–0 | 2012 Africa Cup of Nations | |
| 53 | 82 | 4 February 2012 | Nuevo Estadio de Malabo, Malabo, Equatorial Guinea | Equatorial Guinea | 2–0 | 3–0 | 2012 Africa Cup of Nations | |
| 54 | 85 | 2 June 2012 | Stade Félix Houphouët-Boigny, Abidjan, Ivory Coast | Tanzania | 2–0 | 2–0 | 2014 FIFA World Cup qualification | |
| 55 | 88 | 8 September 2012 | Stade Félix Houphouët-Boigny, Abidjan, Ivory Coast | Senegal | 3–2‡ | 4–2 | 2013 Africa Cup of Nations qualification | |
| 56 | 89 | 13 October 2012 | Stade Léopold Sédar Senghor, Dakar, Senegal | Senegal | 1–0 | 2–0 | 2013 Africa Cup of Nations qualification | |
| 57 | 89 | 13 October 2012 | Stade Léopold Sédar Senghor, Dakar, Senegal | Senegal | 2–0‡ | 2–0 | 2013 Africa Cup of Nations qualification | |
| 58 | 90 | 14 November 2012 | Linzer Stadion, Linz, Austria | Austria | 2–0 | 3–0 | Friendly | |
| 59 | 94 | 30 January 2013 | Royal Bafokeng Stadium, Rustenburg, South Africa | Algeria | 1–2 | 2–2 | 2013 Africa Cup of Nations | |
| 60 | 96 | 14 August 2013 | MetLife Stadium, New Jersey, United States | Mexico | 1–3‡ | 1–4 | Friendly | |
| 61 | 97 | 7 September 2013 | Stade Félix Houphouët-Boigny, Abidjan, Ivory Coast | Morocco | 1–1‡ | 1–1 | 2014 FIFA World Cup qualification | |
| 62 | 98 | 12 October 2013 | Stade Félix Houphouët-Boigny, Abidjan, Ivory Coast | Senegal | 1–0‡ | 3–1 | 2014 FIFA World Cup qualification | |
| 63 | 100 | 5 March 2014 | King Baudouin Stadium, Brussels, Belgium | Belgium | 1–2 | 2–2 | Friendly | |
| 64 | 101 | 30 May 2014 | The Dome at America's Center, St. Louis, United States | Bosnia and Herzegovina | 1–2 | 1–2 | Friendly | |
| 65 | 102 | 4 June 2014 | Toyota Stadium, Frisco, Texas, United States | El Salvador | 2–0 | 2–1 | Friendly | |

== Hat-tricks ==
| No. | Opponent | Goals | Score | Venue | Competition | Date |
|---|---|---|---|---|---|---|
| 1 | Burundi | 3 – (1–0', 2–0', 3–0') | 6–1 | Stade Félix Houphouët-Boigny, Abidjan, Ivory Coast | 2004 African Cup of Nations qualification | 8 June 2003 |

== Statistics ==
Appearances and goals by year and competition
| Year | Competitive | | Friendly | | Total | |
| Year | Apps | Goals | Apps | Goals | Apps | Goals |
|---|---|---|---|---|---|---|
| 2002 | 1 (Note: Appearances in the 2004 African Cup of Nations qualification.) | 0 | — | | 1 | 0 |
| 2003 | 3 (Note: Three appearances and three goals in the 2004 African Cup of Nations qualification.) | 3 | 4 | 1 | 7 | 4 |
| 2004 | 4 (Note: Four appearances and three goals in the 2006 FIFA World Cup qualification.) | 3 | 3 | 3 | 7 | 6 |
| 2005 | 5 (Note: Five appearances and six goals in the 2006 FIFA World Cup qualification.) | 6 | 3 | 1 | 8 | 7 |
| 2006 | 8 (Note: Five appearances and three goals in the 2006 Africa Cup of Nations, two appearances and one goal in the 2006 FIFA World Cup, one appearance in the 2008 Africa Cup of Nations qualification.) | 4 | 7 | 4 | 15 | 8 |
| 2007 | 2 (Note: Tow appearances and one goal in the 2008 Africa Cup of Nations qualification.) | 1 | 6 | 3 | 8 | 4 |
| 2008 | 6 (Note: Six appearances and three goals in the 2008 Africa Cup of Nations.) | 3 | 2 | 1 | 8 | 4 |
| 2009 | 5 (Note: Five appearances and six goals in the 2010 FIFA World Cup qualification.) | 6 | 1 | 1 | 6 | 7 |
| 2010 | 6 (Note: Three appearances and one goal in the 2010 Africa Cup of Nations, three appearances and one goal in the 2010 FIFA World Cup.) | 2 | 5 | 2 | 11 | 4 |
| 2011 | 3 (Note: Three appearances and four goals in the 2012 Africa Cup of Nations qualification.) | 4 | 2 | 1 | 5 | 5 |
| 2012 | 10 (Note: Six appearances and three goals in the 2012 Africa Cup of Nations, tow appearances and one goal in the 2014 FIFA World Cup qualification, tow appearances and three goals in the 2013 Africa Cup of Nations qualification.) | 7 | 4 | 2 | 14 | 9 |
| 2013 | 7 (Note: Four appearances and one goal in the 2013 Africa Cup of Nations, three appearances and tow goal in the 2014 FIFA World Cup qualification.) | 3 | 2 | 1 | 9 | 4 |
| 2014 | 3 (Note: Appearances in the 2014 FIFA World Cup.) | 0 | 3 | 3 | 6 | 3 |
| Total | 63 | 42 | 42 | 23 | 105 | 65 |

Goals by competition
| Competition | Apps | Goals |
|---|---|---|
| Friendlies | 42 | 23 |
| FIFA World Cup qualification | 19 | 18 |
| Africa Cup of Nations | 24 | 11 |
| Africa Cup of Nations qualification | 12 | 11 |
| FIFA World Cup | 8 | 2 |
| Total | 105 | 65 |

Goals by confederation
| Confederation | Teams | Goals |
|---|---|---|
| CAF | 19 | 47 |
| UEFA | 8 | 11 |
| CONMEBOL | 3 | 3 |
| AFC | 2 | 2 |
| CONCACAF | 2 | 2 |
| Total | 34 | 65 |

Goals by opponent
| Opponent | Goals |
|---|---|
| Benin | 7 |
| Senegal | 4 |
| Austria | 3 |
| Burkina Faso | 3 |
| Burundi | 3 |
| Cameroon | 3 |
| Egypt | 3 |
| Guinea | 3 |
| Malawi | 3 |
| Tunisia | 3 |
| Equatorial Guinea | 2 |
| Libya | 2 |
| Morocco | 2 |
| Slovenia | 2 |
| Sudan | 2 |
| Tanzania | 2 |
| Algeria | 1 |
| Argentina | 1 |
| Belgium | 1 |
| Bosnia and Herzegovina | 1 |
| Brazil | 1 |
| El Salvador | 1 |
| Ghana | 1 |
| Israel | 1 |
| Italy | 1 |
| Jordan | 1 |
| Kuwait | 1 |
| Madagascar | 1 |
| Mali | 1 |
| Mexico | 1 |
| Nigeria | 1 |
| Paraguay | 1 |
| Sweden | 1 |
| Turkey | 1 |
| Total | 65 |

== See also ==
- List of top international men's football goalscorers by country
- List of men's footballers with 50 or more international goals
- List of men's footballers with 100 or more international caps
