= List of international goals scored by Kenny Dalglish =

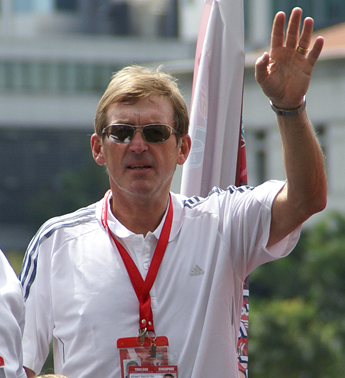
Kenny Dalglish, pictured in 2009

Kenny Dalglish is a Scottish retired football player, who represented the Scotland national football team from 1971 to 1986. During that time he scored 30 international goals in 102 appearances. This made him the all-time top goalscorer for Scotland, a status he has jointly held with Denis Law since scoring his 30th goal in 1984.

Dalglish is one of only two Scottish male players to have made at least 100 international appearances. He finished second in the Ballon d'Or voting in 1983, and was selected for Scotland squads in the 1974, 1978 and 1982 World Cups.

== List of goals scored ==
Scores and results list Scotland's goal tally first.

Goal	Cap	Date	Venue	Opponent	Score	Result	Competition	Ref.
1	4	15 November 1972	Hampden Park, Glasgow	Denmark	1–0	2–0	1974 FIFA World Cup qualification	
2	7	16 May 1973	Hampden Park, Glasgow	Northern Ireland	1–2	1–2	1972–73 British Home Championship	
3	14	27 March 1974	Waldstadion, Frankfurt	West Germany	1–2	1–2	Friendly	
4	16	14 May 1974	Hampden Park, Glasgow	Wales	1–0	2–0	1973–74 British Home Championship	
5	19	6 June 1974	Ullevaal Stadion, Oslo	Norway	1–1	2–1	Friendly	
6	23	30 October 1974	Hampden Park, Glasgow	East Germany	3–0	3–0	Friendly	
7	29	20 May 1975	Hampden Park, Glasgow	Northern Ireland	2–0	3–0	1974–75 British Home Championship	
8	33	29 October 1975	Hampden Park, Glasgow	Denmark	1–1	3–1	UEFA Euro 1976 qualification	
9	36	8 May 1976	Hampden Park, Glasgow	Northern Ireland	3–0	3–0	1975–76 British Home Championship	
10	37	15 May 1976	Hampden Park, Glasgow	England	2–1	2–1	1975–76 British Home Championship	
11	38	8 September 1976	Hampden Park, Glasgow	Finland	3–0	6–0	Friendly	
12	41	27 April 1977	Hampden Park, Glasgow	Sweden	2–1	3–1	Friendly	
13	43	1 June 1977	Hampden Park, Glasgow	Northern Ireland	1–0	3–0	1976–77 British Home Championship	
14	43	1 June 1977	Hampden Park, Glasgow	Northern Ireland	3–0	3–0	1976–77 British Home Championship	
15	44	4 June 1977	Wembley Stadium, London	England	2–0	2–1	1976–77 British Home Championship	
16	45	15 June 1977	Estadio Nacional de Chile, Santiago	Chile	1–0	4–2	Friendly	
17	49	21 September 1977	Hampden Park, Glasgow	Czechoslovakia	3–0	3–1	1978 FIFA World Cup qualification	
18	50	12 October 1977	Anfield, Liverpool	Wales	2–0	2–0	1978 FIFA World Cup qualification	
19	57	11 June 1978	Estadio San Martin, Mendoza	Netherlands	1–1	3–2	1978 FIFA World Cup	
20	59	25 October 1978	Hampden Park, Glasgow	Norway	1–1	3–2	UEFA Euro 1980 qualification	
21	59	25 October 1978	Hampden Park, Glasgow	Norway	2–2	3–2	UEFA Euro 1980 qualification	
22	65	7 June 1979	Ullevaal Stadion, Oslo	Norway	2–0	4–0	UEFA Euro 1980 qualification	
23	70	26 March 1980	Hampden Park, Glasgow	Portugal	1–0	4–1	UEFA Euro 1980 qualification	
24	78	25 February 1981	National Stadium, Ramat Gan	Israel	1–0	1–0	1982 FIFA World Cup qualification	
25	83	23 March 1982	Hampden Park, Glasgow	Netherlands	2–0	2–1	Friendly	
26	87	15 June 1982	Estadio La Rosaleda, Málaga	New Zealand	1–0	5–2	1982 FIFA World Cup	
27	89	15 December 1982	Stade Heysel, Brussels	Belgium	1–0	2–3	UEFA Euro 1984 qualification	
28	89	15 December 1982	Stade Heysel, Brussels	Belgium	2–1	2–3	UEFA Euro 1984 qualification	
29	94	12 September 1984	Hampden Park, Glasgow	Yugoslavia	3–1	6–1	Friendly	
30	96	14 November 1984	Hampden Park, Glasgow	Spain	3–1	3–1	1986 FIFA World Cup qualification	

== Statistics ==
Caps and goals by year
Year	Apps	Goals
1971	2	0
1972	2	1
1973	9	1
1974	11	4
1975	10	2
1976	6	3
1977	10	7
1978	10	3
1979	9	1
1980	8	1
1981	4	1
1982	8	4
1983	4	0
1984	3	2
1985	3	0
1986	3	0
Total	102	30

Caps and goals by competition
Competition	Caps	Goals
Friendlies	30	8
British Home Championship	26	8
UEFA Euro qualifying	21	7
FIFA World Cup qualification	17	5
FIFA World Cup Finals	8	2
Total	102	30

Caps and goals by opponent
Opponent	Caps	Goals
Argentina	2	0
Australia	1	0
Austria	2	0
Belgium	6	2
Brazil	4	0
Bulgaria	2	0
Chile	1	1
Czechoslovakia	4	1
Denmark	4	2
East Germany	4	1
England	10	2
Finland	1	1
Hungary	1	0
Iceland	1	0
Iran	1	0
Israel	1	1
Luxembourg	1	0
Netherlands	3	2
New Zealand	1	1
Northern Ireland	10	5
Norway	3	4
Peru	2	0
Poland	1	0
Portugal	5	1
Romania	3	0
Spain	4	1
Sweden	4	1
Switzerland	3	0
Uruguay	1	0
Wales	11	2
West Germany	2	1
Yugoslavia	2	1
Zaire	1	0
Total	102	30

== See also ==
- List of international goals scored by Denis Law
- Scotland national football team records and statistics
