= List of top international men's football goalscorers by country =

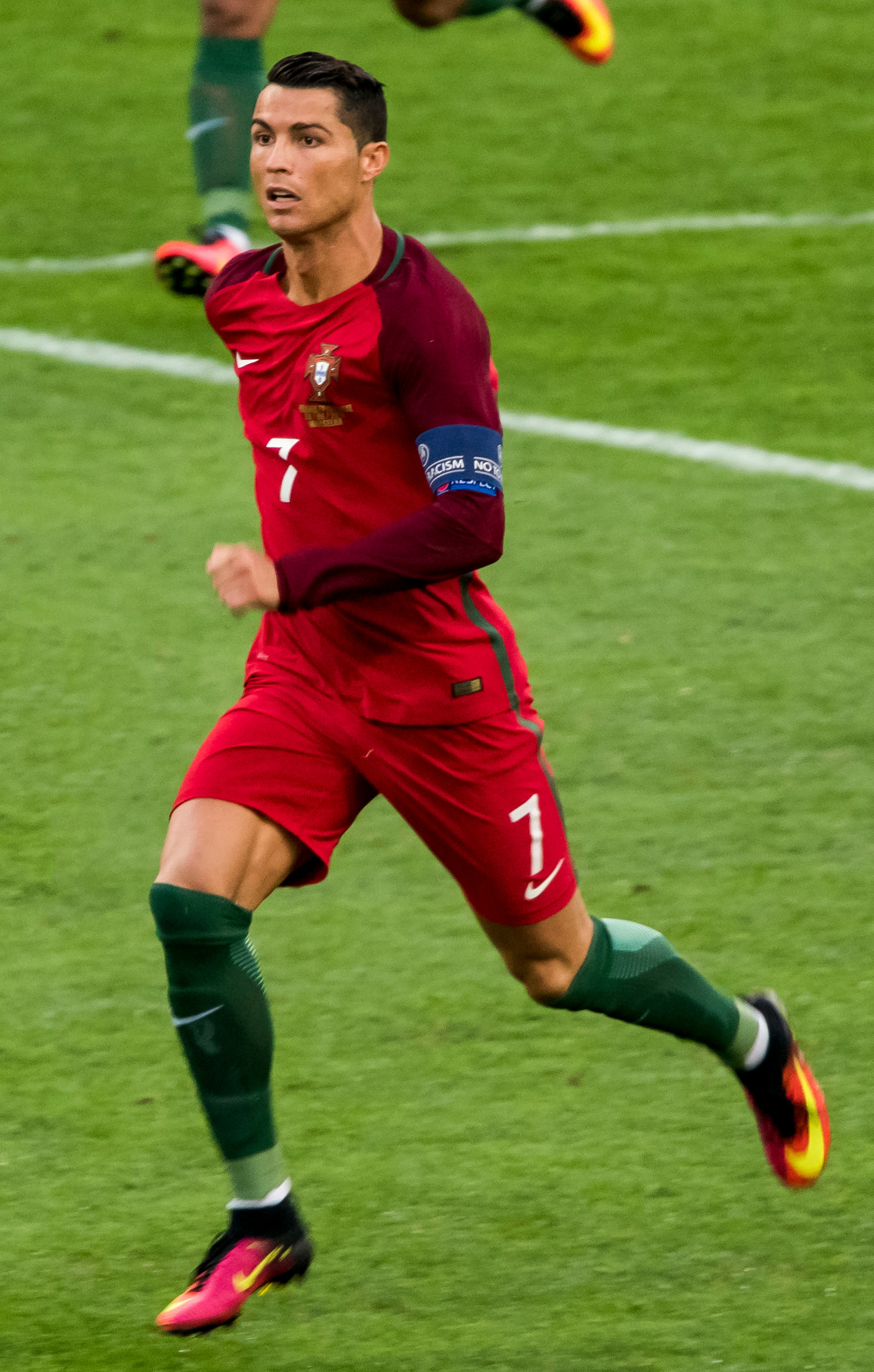
Cristiano Ronaldo of Portugal is the all-time leading goalscorer for men's national teams.

This article lists the top all-time goalscorer for each men's national football team. This list is not an all-time top international goalscorers list, as several countries have two or more players with more goals than another country's top scorer. It simply lists only the top scorer for each country.

== List of top scorers ==
Players in bold are still active at international level.
Players in italics also hold the record for most caps for their nation.
Rank is a count of the 211 FIFA nations. Fourteen nations (Bermuda, Bulgaria, Denmark, Faroe Islands, Kenya, Lesotho, Romania, Saint Kitts and Nevis, Scotland, Sierra Leone, Somalia, South Sudan, Tanzania and United States) have a pair of players tied for national leader while Anguilla has three players tied as their leading scorer.

Rank	Player	Country	Goals	Caps	Ratio	First cap	Last cap	Ref.
1	Cristiano Ronaldo	Portugal	146	234	0.62	20 August 2003	24 September 2026	
2	Lionel Messi	Argentina	126	208	0.61	17 August 2005	6 October 2026	
3	Ali Daei (Note: Daei was originally credited with scoring 109 goals, however FIFA no longer recognises Iran's match against Ecuador in 2000 as Ecuador fielded their Olympic team, rather than their full 'A' international side.)	Iran	108	148	0.73	6 June 1993	21 June 2006	
4	Sunil Chhetri	India	95	157	0.61	12 June 2005	14 October 2025	
5	Romelu Lukaku	Belgium	94	135	0.7	3 March 2010	5 October 2026	
6	**Harry Kane**	England	93	127	0.73	27 March 2015	15 November 2026	
7	**Robert Lewandowski**	Poland	92	172	0.53	10 September 2008	17 November 2026	
8	Mokhtar Dahari	Malaysia	89	142	0.63	5 June 1972	19 May 1985	
9	Ali Mabkhout	United Arab Emirates	85	115	0.74	15 November 2009	6 January 2024	
10	Ferenc Puskás	Hungary	84	85	0.99	20 August 1945	14 October 1956	
11	Neymar	Brazil	80	130	0.62	10 August 2010	5 July 2026	
12	Godfrey Chitalu	Zambia	79	111	0.71	29 June 1968	12 December 1980	
13	Hussein Saeed	Iraq	78	137	0.57	5 September 1976	3 March 1990	
14	Kunishige Kamamoto	Japan	75	76	0.99	3 March 1964	15 June 1977	
14	Bashar Abdullah	Kuwait	75	134	0.56	16 March 1996	26 May 2018 (Note: Abdullah retired internationally in 2007, but played a testimonial against Egypt in 2018.)	
16	Edin Džeko	Bosnia and Herzegovina	73	152	0.48	2 June 2007	2 October 2026	
17	Majed Abdullah	Saudi Arabia	72	117	0.62	10 December 1978	29 June 1994	
18	Kinnah Phiri	Malawi	71	117	0.61	8 July 1973	20 November 1981	
18	Kiatisuk Senamuang	Thailand	71	134	0.53	8 April 1993	3 October 2007	
18	Miroslav Klose	Germany	71	137	0.52	24 March 2001	13 July 2014	
21	Abdul Kadir	Indonesia	70	111	0.63	11 August 1967	7 May 1979	
21	Stern John	Trinidad and Tobago	70	115	0.61	15 February 1995	11 November 2011	
21	**Mohamed Salah**	Egypt	70	124	0.56	3 September 2011	17 November 2026	
24	Luis Suárez	Uruguay	69	143	0.48	7 February 2007	6 September 2024	
25	**Erling Haaland**	Norway	68	61	1.11	5 September 2019	17 November 2026	
25	Carlos Ruiz	Guatemala	68	133	0.51	18 November 1998	6 September 2016	
25	Robbie Keane	Republic of Ireland	68	146	0.47	25 March 1998	31 August 2016	
28	**Kylian Mbappé**	France	67	108	0.62	25 March 2017	15 November 2026	
29	Didier Drogba	Ivory Coast	65	105	0.62	8 September 2002	24 June 2014	
30	**Aleksandar Mitrović**	Serbia	64	108	0.59	7 June 2013	16 November 2026	
31	Zlatan Ibrahimović	Sweden	62	122	0.51	31 January 2001	24 March 2023	
32	**Almoez Ali**	Qatar	61	134	0.46	21 December 2013	17 November 2026	
33	David Villa	Spain	59	98	0.6	9 February 2005	2 September 2017	
33	**Son Heung-min**	South Korea	59	153	0.39	30 December 2010	17 November 2026	
35	**Ali Ashfaq**	Maldives	58	101	0.57	25 March 2003	4 June 2026	
36	Carlos Pavón	Honduras	57	101	0.56	17 July 1993	16 June 2010	
36	Clint Dempsey	United States	57	141	0.4	17 November 2004	10 October 2017	
36	Landon Donovan	United States	57	157	0.36	25 October 2000	10 October 2014	
38	Samuel Eto'o	Cameroon	56	118	0.47	9 March 1997	13 June 2014	
38	**Sadio Mané**	Senegal	56	134	0.42	25 May 2012	1 July 2026	
40	Jan Koller	Czech Republic	55	91	0.6	9 February 1999	5 September 2009	
40	Fandi Ahmad	Singapore	55	101	0.54	22 September 1979	18 October 1997	
40	**Memphis Depay**	Netherlands	55	112	0.49	15 October 2013	25 June 2026	
43	Poul Nielsen	Denmark	52	38	1.37	5 May 1910	27 September 1925	
43	Jon Dahl Tomasson	Denmark	52	112	0.46	29 March 1997	24 June 2010	
43	Phil Younghusband	Philippines	52	108	0.48	12 November 2006	16 January 2019	
43	Javier Hernández	Mexico	52	109	0.48	30 September 2009	6 September 2019	
46	Lê Công Vinh	Vietnam	51	83	0.61	9 June 2004	7 December 2016	
46	Asamoah Gyan	Ghana	51	109	0.47	16 November 2003	8 July 2019	
46	Hakan Şükür	Turkey	51	112	0.46	25 March 1992	17 October 2007	
46	Alexis Sánchez	Chile	51	168	0.3	27 April 2006	10 June 2025	
50	Tim Cahill	Australia	50	108	0.46	30 March 2004	20 November 2018	
50	**Salomón Rondón**	Venezuela	50	122	0.41	3 February 2008	30 March 2026	
52	Enner Valencia	Ecuador	49	109	0.45	29 February 2012	30 June 2026	
52	Marko Arnautović	Austria	49	137	0.36	11 October 2008	2 July 2026	
54	Dimitar Berbatov	Bulgaria	48	78	0.62	17 November 1999	3 March 2010	
54	Hristo Bonev	Bulgaria	48	96	0.5	22 March 1967	25 April 1979	
54	Andriy Shevchenko	Ukraine	48	111	0.43	25 March 1995	19 June 2012	
54	Ismail Abdullatif	Bahrain	48	138	0.35	27 October 2005	25 March 2025	
57	**Roy Krishna**	Fiji	47	68	0.69	25 August 2007	3 October 2026	
57	**Chris Wood**	New Zealand	47	97	0.48	3 June 2009	15 November 2026	
57	**Eldor Shomurodov**	Uzbekistan	47	98	0.48	3 September 2015	12 November 2026	
57	Rolando Fonseca	Costa Rica	47	113	0.42	27 May 1992	26 March 2011	
61	Islam Slimani	Algeria	46	105	0.44	26 May 2012	9 December 2025	
62	Davor Šuker	Croatia	45	68	0.66	22 October 1992	3 June 2002	
62	**Jonathan David**	Canada	45	87	0.52	9 September 2018	16 November 2026	
64	**Duckens Nazon**	Haiti	44	83	0.53	5 March 2014	24 June 2026	
64	Peter Byers	Antigua and Barbuda	44	91	0.48	18 February 2004	8 June 2021	
66	Luis Tejada	Panama	43	108	0.4	5 August 2001	28 June 2018	
66	Teemu Pukki	Finland	43	133	0.32	4 February 2009	17 November 2025	
68	Alexander Frei	Switzerland	42	84	0.5	24 March 2001	26 March 2011	
68	Hani Al-Dhabit	Oman	42	100	0.42	25 March 1997	14 November 2014	
68	Oleg Blokhin	Soviet Union (Note: Following the dissolution of the Soviet Union, the team's records were inherited by Russia.)	42	112	0.38	16 July 1972	21 September 1988	
68	Michael Mifsud	Malta	42	143	0.29	10 February 2000	11 November 2020	
72	Gareth Bale	Wales	41	111	0.37	27 May 2006	29 November 2022	
73	Ali Al-Biski	Libya	40	44	0.91	3 September 1961	27 December 1970	
73	Chan Siu Ki	Hong Kong	40	70	0.57	30 November 2004	5 September 2017	
73	Pierre-Emerick Aubameyang	Gabon	40	86	0.47	28 March 2009	28 December 2025	
73	Paolo Guerrero	Peru	40	128	0.31	9 October 2004	10 June 2025	
77	Raúl Díaz Arce	El Salvador	39	66	0.59	14 April 1991	2 September 2000	
77	Akwá	Angola	39	78	0.5	8 January 1995	21 June 2006	
77	Hao Haidong	China	39	106	0.37	22 August 1992	17 November 2004	
80	Goran Pandev	North Macedonia	38	122	0.31	6 June 2001	21 June 2021	
80	Andres Oper	Estonia	38	134	0.28	19 May 1995	26 May 2014	
82	Rashidi Yekini	Nigeria	37	62	0.6	30 October 1983	28 June 1998	
82	Ricky Charles	Grenada	37	71	0.52	21 March 1995	13 June 2011	
82	Peter Ndlovu	Zimbabwe	37	81	0.46	25 August 1990	25 March 2007	
82	**Stevan Jovetić**	Montenegro	37	96	0.39	24 March 2007	15 November 2026	
86	Myo Hlaing Win	Myanmar	36	63	0.57	25 November 1992	15 January 2005	
86	Firas Al-Khatib	Syria	36	72	0.5	4 May 2001	5 September 2019	
86	Issam Jemâa	Tunisia	36	84	0.43	27 May 2005	10 October 2014	
86	Ahmed Faras	Morocco	36	94	0.38	19 April 1966	9 December 1979	
86	David Healy	Northern Ireland	36	95	0.38	23 February 2000	26 March 2013	
86	Radamel Falcao	Colombia	36	104	0.35	7 February 2007	28 March 2023	
92	Gigi Riva	Italy	35	42	0.83	27 June 1965	19 June 1974	
92	William Ouma	Kenya	35	66	0.53	28 February 1965	22 January 1977	
92	**Michael Olunga**	Kenya	35	71	0.49	28 March 2015	17 November 2026	
92	Eran Zahavi	Israel	35	74	0.47	2 September 2010	21 March 2024	
92	Luton Shelton	Jamaica	35	75	0.47	2 October 2004	10 September 2013	
92	Adrian Mutu	Romania	35	77	0.45	29 March 2000	26 March 2013	
92	Gheorghe Hagi	Romania	35	124	0.28	10 August 1983	24 June 2000	
92	Zlatko Zahovič	Slovenia	35	80	0.44	18 November 1992	28 April 2004	
98	Commins Menapi	Solomon Islands	34	36	0.94	21 June 2000	7 September 2007	
98	**Oalex Anderson**	Saint Vincent and the Grenadines	34	59	0.58	7 February 2014	17 November 2026	
98	Moumouni Dagano	Burkina Faso	34	83	0.41	23 August 1998	10 February 2013	
101	Ibrahima Kandia Diallo	Guinea	33	56	0.59	2 October 1960	16 January 1973	
101	Getaneh Kebede	Ethiopia	33	66	0.5	4 December 2010	17 January 2022	
101	**Vedat Muriqi**	Kosovo	33	73	0.45	9 October 2016	17 November 2026	
104	**Teaonui Tehau**	Tahiti	32	52	0.62	3 April 2011	16 November 2026	
104	**Ali Olwan**	Jordan	32	71	0.45	12 November 2020	17 November 2026	
104	Michalis Konstantinou	Cyprus	32	84	0.38	14 February 1997	12 October 2012	
104	Emmanuel Adebayor	Togo	32	87	0.37	8 July 2000	24 March 2019	
104	Henrikh Mkhitaryan	Armenia	32	95	0.34	14 January 2007	14 November 2021	
104	Roque Santa Cruz	Paraguay	32	112	0.29	28 April 1999	10 November 2016	
110	Benni McCarthy	South Africa	31	80	0.39	4 June 1997	7 September 2012	
110	**Jong Il-gwan**	North Korea	31	85	0.36	26 March 2011	19 November 2024	
110	Marcelo Moreno	Bolivia	31	108	0.29	12 September 2007	21 November 2023	
113	Denis Law	Scotland	30	55	0.55	18 October 1958	14 June 1974	
113	Kenny Dalglish	Scotland	30	102	0.29	10 November 1971	12 November 1986	
113	Lester Moré	Cuba	30	60	0.5	12 May 1996	8 June 2007	
113	Ali Al-Nono	Yemen	30	66	0.45	10 February 2000	28 November 2010	
113	Tico-Tico	Mozambique	30	94	0.32	16 August 1992	20 January 2010	
117	**Dorny Romero**	Dominican Republic	29	54	0.54	16 February 2019	17 November 2026	
117	Nikos Anastopoulos	Greece	29	74	0.39	21 September 1977	2 November 1988	
117	Māris Verpakovskis	Latvia	29	104	0.28	9 June 1999	29 May 2014	
120	Deon McCaulay	Belize	28	63	0.44	8 February 2007	14 June 2022	
120	**Gylfi Sigurðsson**	Iceland	28	92	0.3	29 May 2010	16 November 2026	
120	Emmanuel Okwi	Uganda	28	95	0.29	7 March 2009	18 June 2023	
123	**Omari Glasgow**	Guyana	27	42	0.64	30 March 2021	12 November 2026	
123	Nasr Eddin Abbas (Note: The exact number of caps, goals and first/last appearance have yet to be verified for this player.)	Sudan	27	52	0.52	30 June 1963	29 February 1972	
123	Kasun Jayasuriya	Sri Lanka	27	56	0.48	23 April 1999	11 December 2009	
126	Shota Arveladze	Georgia	26	61	0.43	23 February 1994	24 March 2007	
126	**Jason Cunliffe**	Guam	26	74	0.35	3 April 2006	6 June 2026	
126	**Juan Barrera**	Nicaragua	26	107	0.24	22 January 2009	17 November 2026	
126	Hassan Maatouk	Lebanon	26	123	0.21	27 January 2006	11 June 2024	
126	Marek Hamšík	Slovakia	26	138	0.19	7 February 2007	20 June 2023	
131	Emilio Nsue	Equatorial Guinea	25	51	0.49	24 March 2013	31 December 2025	
131	**Chen Po-liang**	Chinese Taipei	25	98	0.26	22 February 2006	14 November 2026	
131	Mrisho Ngasa	Tanzania	25	100	0.25	25 November 2006	14 November 2015	
131	**Simon Msuva**	Tanzania	25	107	0.23	15 August 2012	17 November 2026	
131	Seydou Keita	Mali	25	102	0.25	4 October 1998	28 January 2015	
135	**Tiquanny Williams**	Saint Kitts and Nevis	24	36	0.67	8 June 2021	17 November 2026	
135	Keith Gumbs	Saint Kitts and Nevis	24	41	0.59	2 April 1993	15 November 2011	
135	Jerome Ramatlhakwane	Botswana	24	61	0.39	15 November 2006	18 April 2018	
135	Olivier Karekezi	Rwanda	24	70	0.34	9 April 2000	16 June 2013	
135	Stéphane Sessègnon	Benin	24	89	0.27	23 May 2004	9 September 2023	
139	Llewellyn Riley	Barbados	23	43	0.53	26 March 1995	24 February 2005	
139	Bertrand Kaï	New Caledonia	23	43	0.53	14 June 2008	24 March 2022	
139	**Ricardo Rivera**	Puerto Rico	23	48	0.48	28 August 2016	16 November 2026	
139	Gerson Rodrigues	Luxembourg	23	72	0.32	25 March 2017	10 June 2025	
143	**Billy Forbes**	Turks and Caicos Islands	22	40	0.55	6 February 2008	6 October 2026	
143	Dieumerci Mbokani	DR Congo	22	49	0.45	1 July 2005	29 March 2022	
143	**Victorien Adebayor**	Niger	22	69	0.32	31 March 2015	6 October 2026	
143	**Peter Shalulile**	Namibia	22	72	0.31	10 September 2014	16 November 2026	
143	**Ryan Mendes**	Cape Verde	22	106	0.21	11 August 2010	17 November 2026	
148	Rangelo Janga	Curaçao	21	43	0.49	23 March 2016	19 March 2025	
148	**Oday Dabbagh**	Palestine	21	61	0.34	27 March 2018	17 November 2026	
150	Shaun Goater	Bermuda	20	22	0.91	18 February 1988	13 June 2004	
150	**Nahki Wells** (Note: Wells also appeared in one match at the 2007 Island Games against a side that was not FIFA members – nor were they associate members of one of FIFA's affiliated confederations – and therefore the match is not counted here.)	Bermuda	20	32	0.63	14 December 2007	2 October 2026	
150	Earl Jean	Saint Lucia	20	23	0.87	27 May 1990	19 December 2004	
150	Hok Sochetra	Cambodia	20	26	0.77	10 December 1995	19 December 2002	
150	Richard Iwai	Vanuatu	20	34	0.59	11 April 2000	24 January 2011	
150	El Fardou Ben Nabouhane	Comoros	20	47	0.43	5 March 2014	29 December 2025	
150	**Julian Wade**	Dominica	20	52	0.38	6 October 2010	19 November 2024	
150	Manuchekhr Dzhalilov	Tajikistan	20	54	0.37	2 September 2011	25 March 2025	
150	Maksim Romaschenko	Belarus	20	63	0.32	7 August 1998	27 May 2008	
158	Visay Phaphouvanin	Laos	19	50	0.38	18 December 2002	6 March 2013	
158	Fiston Abdul Razak	Burundi	19	53	0.36	2 December 2009	9 January 2024	
158	Tomas Danilevičius	Lithuania	19	72	0.26	14 October 1998	12 October 2012	
161	Muhammad Umer	Pakistan	18	35	0.51	26 August 1956	23 July 1965	
161	**Raymond Gunemba** (Note: Gunemba scored one goal against Vanuatu B, however that was not against a full international 'A' side and therefore is not included on this list.)	Papua New Guinea	18	38	0.47	8 April 2012	23 November 2025	
161	**Ion Nicolaescu**	Moldova	18	56	0.32	8 September 2018	16 November 2025	
161	Erjon Bogdani	Albania	18	75	0.24	24 April 1996	26 March 2013	
161	George Weah	Liberia	18	75	0.24	23 February 1986	11 September 2018 (Note: Weah retired internationally in 2002, but played a testimonial against Nigeria in 2018.)	
166	**Lyle Taylor**	Montserrat	17	24	0.71	27 March 2015	6 October 2026	
166	Chan Kin Seng	Macau	17	29	0.59	2 April 2006	17 March 2013	
166	**Louis Mafouta**	Central African Republic	17	35	0.49	27 March 2017	16 November 2026	
166	Ashrafuddin Chunnu	Bangladesh	17	50	0.34	2 August 1975	4 May 1985	
166	Daniel Imbert	Mauritius	17	53	0.32	21 May 1972	16 July 1983	
166	**Sabelo Ndzinisa**	Eswatini	17	78	0.22	11 November 2012	11 June 2025	
172	Wladimir Baýramow	Turkmenistan	16	35	0.46	12 February 2000	26 March 2013	
172	Thievy Bifouma	Congo	16	41	0.39	2 August 2014	10 September 2023	
172	**Musa Barrow**	Gambia	16	55	0.29	8 September 2018	17 November 2026	
172	Mirlan Murzayev	Kyrgyzstan	16	61	0.26	28 March 2009	11 September 2023	
172	**Emin Mahmudov**	Azerbaijan	16	66	0.24	4 September 2016	16 November 2026	
172	Mario Frick	Liechtenstein	16	125	0.13	26 October 1993	12 October 2015	
178	**Gleofilo Vlijter**	Suriname	15	37	0.41	30 April 2015	5 October 2026	
178	**Bakhtiyar Zaynutdinov**	Kazakhstan	15	44	0.34	23 March 2018	13 October 2025	
178	Paulin Voavy	Madagascar	15	67	0.22	29 March 2003	27 September 2022	
178	**Sera Motebang**	Lesotho	15	84	0.18	29 March 2016	17 November 2026	
178	Jane Thaba-Ntšo	Lesotho	15	101	0.15	19 November 2014	29 March 2026	
182	Philip Zialor	Seychelles	14	33	0.42	11 August 1998	20 October 2009	
182	Ganesh Thapa	Nepal	14	40	0.35	31 March 1981	20 October 1989	
182	Lesly St. Fleur	Bahamas	14	45	0.31	2 September 2006	15 October 2024	
182	**Chencho Gyeltshen**	Bhutan	14	49	0.29	19 March 2011	8 June 2026	
182	Ezechiel N'Douassel	Chad	14	51	0.27	8 February 2005	10 June 2025	
187	Bessam	Mauritania	13	66	0.2	2 March 2013	27 January 2023	
188	Lee Ramoon (Note: Ramoon also scored at least one goal for the Cayman Islands prior to their acceptance as full CONCACAF members in 1990.)	Cayman Islands	12	17	0.71	10 May 1991	26 January 2004	
189	**Samuel Akinbinu**	Djibouti	11	25	0.44	15 June 2021	29 March 2026	
189	Luís Leal	São Tomé and Príncipe	11	29	0.38	16 June 2012	9 June 2024	
189	Ildefons Lima	Andorra	11	137	0.08	22 June 1997	12 September 2023	
192	**Mama Baldé**	Guinea-Bissau	10	41	0.24	8 June 2019	17 November 2026	
192	Rógvi Jacobsen	Faroe Islands	10	54	0.19	18 August 1999	14 October 2009	
192	Klæmint Olsen	Faroe Islands	10	64	0.16	7 September 2012	10 September 2024	
192	Faysal Shayesteh	Afghanistan	10	59	0.17	13 April 2014	17 October 2023	
195	Desmond Fa'aiuaso	Samoa	9	20	0.45	7 April 2001	5 June 2016	
195	**Rovien Ostiana**	Aruba	9	24	0.38	11 September 2023	16 November 2026	
195	**João Pedro**	Timor-Leste	9	30	0.3	1 September 2018	30 September 2026	
195	Nyam-Osor Naranbold	Mongolia	9	33	0.27	23 July 2014	10 September 2024	
195	**Azwan Ali Rahman**	Brunei	9	34	0.26	5 October 2012	30 September 2026	
200	Mohamed Kallon	Sierra Leone	8	40	0.2	7 January 1995	8 September 2012	
200	Kei Kamara	Sierra Leone	8	45	0.18	1 June 2008	12 October 2025	
200	Andy Selva	San Marino	8	73	0.11	10 October 1998	11 October 2016	
200	**Liam Walker** (Note: Walker also scored at least five goals for Gibraltar prior to their acceptance as full UEFA members in 2013.)	Gibraltar	8	88	0.09	19 November 2013	9 June 2025	
203	**Ali Sulieman**	Eritrea	7	15	0.47	4 September 2019	16 November 2026	
203	Unaloto Feao	Tonga	7	17	0.41	7 April 2001	12 December 2017	
203	Taylor Saghabi	Cook Islands	7	19	0.37	27 August 2011	9 September 2024	
203	**Tyler Forbes**	British Virgin Islands	7	43	0.16	16 October 2018	4 October 2026	
207	James Moga	South Sudan	6	18	0.33	10 July 2012	22 July 2017	
207	**Tito Okello**	South Sudan	6	29	0.21	12 November 2020	10 October 2025	
208	Richard O'Connor	Anguilla	5	5	1	25 February 2000	24 September 2006	
208	Terrence Rogers	Anguilla	5	16	0.31	25 February 2000	14 October 2012	
208	Girdon Connor	Anguilla	5	29	0.17	25 February 2000	18 November 2018	
209	**Ali'i Mitchell**	American Samoa	4	7	0.57	31 August 2015	28 March 2026	
209	**Jannick Liburd**	U.S. Virgin Islands	4	9	0.44	12 October 2024	4 October 2026	
211	Abdullahi Mohamed	Somalia	3	6	0.5	19 April 2000	29 November 2005	
211	Mohamed Nur	Somalia	3	7	0.43	4 August 1985	4 December 1995	

== List of non-FIFA top scorers ==
These are the top scorers for nations that do not have FIFA membership, but are associate members of one of FIFA's affiliated confederations.

Players in bold are still active at international level.
Players in italics also hold the record for most caps for their nation.

Rank	Player	Country	Goals	Caps	Ratio	First cap	Last cap	Ref.
1	Kévin Parsemain	Martinique	35	57	0.61	11 October 2008	9 June 2022	
2	**Gerwin Lake**	Sint Maarten	21	29	0.72	23 March 2019	17 November 2026	
3	**Axel Raga**	Saint Martin	18	18	1	7 September 2023	17 November 2026	
4	Dominique Mocka	Guadeloupe	17	38	0.45	7 July 2002	27 October 2012	
5	Gary Pigrée	French Guiana	16	20	0.8	21 March 2012	29 March 2015	
6	Jean-Michel Fontaine	Réunion	15	29	0.52	12 June 2007	3 September 2023	
7	**Ayrton Cicilia**	Bonaire	10	25	0.4	9 September 2018	5 October 2026	
8	Abdallah Juma Ally	Zanzibar	9	13	0.69	2 December 2003	18 December 2007	
8	Alopua Petoa	Tuvalu	9	13	0.69	22 August 2011	18 July 2019	
10	Joe Wang Miller	Northern Mariana Islands	4	15	0.27	27 April 2008	4 July 2016	
11	Lawrence Nemeia	Kiribati	2	3	0.67	30 June 2003	7 July 2003	

== List of top scorers from defunct nations ==
These are the top scorers for defunct nations that do not have a FIFA recognised successor team.

Players in italics also hold the record for most caps for their nation.

Rank	Player	Country	Goals	Caps	Ratio	First cap	Last cap	Ref.
1	Joachim Streich	East Germany	55	102	0.54	8 December 1969	20 October 1984	
2	Herbert Binkert	Saar	6	12	0.5	27 May 1951	6 June 1956	
2	Herbert Martin	Saar	6	17	0.35	22 November 1950	6 June 1956	
3	Mohammed Hussein	South Yemen	3	2	1.5	3 November 1989	5 November 1989	

== See also ==
- List of men's footballers with 1,000 or more official appearances
- List of women's footballers with 100 or more international goals
- List of women's footballers with 100 or more international caps
- List of men's footballers with 100 or more international caps
- List of men's footballers with 50 or more international goals
- List of one-club men in association football
- List of footballers with 500 or more goals
- List of association football competitions
- List of goalscoring goalkeepers
