= List of international goals scored by Ali Sulieman =

Ali Sulieman is an Eritrean professional footballer who represented the Eritrea national football team as a forward since 2019. Sulieman scored 7 international goals in 15 FIFA-recognised appearances, making him the country's all-time top-scorer. He surpassed Yidnekachew Shimangus when he scored his 7th goal on 16 November 2026. Sulieman made his senior international debut on 4 September 2019 in a 2022 FIFA World Cup qualification match against Namibia, where he scored his first international goal.

Sulaiman was part of the squad that participated in the 2019 CECAFA Cup; he played in all six of the tournament's matches, scoring a double in the third group-stage game against Djibouti. Eritrea reached the final match and was defeated by Uganda.

In 2026, Eritrea entered the 2027 Africa Cup of Nations qualification preliminary round, set to face Eswatini in both home and away legs. On 25 March, Suleiman scored a goal in the first leg, and six days later, he scored two goals in the second leg, allowing Eritrea to advance to the group stage. On 16 November, in a match against Guinea, Souleymane scored his seventh international goal in his 15th cap during a 1–3 defeat, becoming the country's all-time leading goalscorer.

== Goals ==
Scores and results list Eritrea's goal tally first, score column indicates score after each Sulieman goal.

Table key
Indicates Ivory Coast won the match
Indicates the match ended in a draw
Indicates Ivory Coast lost the match

List of international goals scored by Ali Sulieman
No.	Date	Venue	Opponent	Score	Result	Competition
1	4 September 2019	Denden Stadium, Asmara, Eritrea	Namibia	1–2	1–2	2022 FIFA World Cup qualification
2	13 December 2019	Lugogo Stadium, Kampala, Uganda	Djibouti	2–0	3–0	2019 CECAFA Cup
3	13 December 2019	Lugogo Stadium, Kampala, Uganda	Djibouti	3–0	3–0	2019 CECAFA Cup
4	25 March 2026	Meknes Honor Stadium, Meknes, Morocco	Eswatini	2–0	2–0	2027 Africa Cup of Nations qualification
5	31 March 2026	Somhlolo National Stadium, Lobamba, Eswatini	Eswatini	1–0	2–1	2027 Africa Cup of Nations qualification
6	31 March 2026	Somhlolo National Stadium, Lobamba, Eswatini	Eswatini	2–0	2–1	2027 Africa Cup of Nations qualification
7	16 November 2026	Al Salam Stadium, Cairo, Egypt	Guinea	1–3	1–3	2027 Africa Cup of Nations qualification

== Statistics ==
Appearances and goals by year
Year	Competitive		Friendly		Total	
Year	Apps	Goals	Apps	Goals	Apps	Goals
2019	8	3	0	0	8	3
2020	0	0	1	0	1	0
2026	6	4	0	0	6	4
Total	14	7	1	0	15	7

Appearances and goals by competition
Competition	Apps	Goals
Africa Cup of Nations qualification	6	4
FIFA World Cup qualification	2	1
CECAFA Cup	6	2
Friendlies	1	0
Total	15	7

Goals by Opponent
Opponent	Goals
Namibia	1
Djibouti	2
Eswatini	3
Guinea	1
Total	7

== See also ==
- List of top international association football goal scorers by country
