= List of international goals scored by Denis Law =

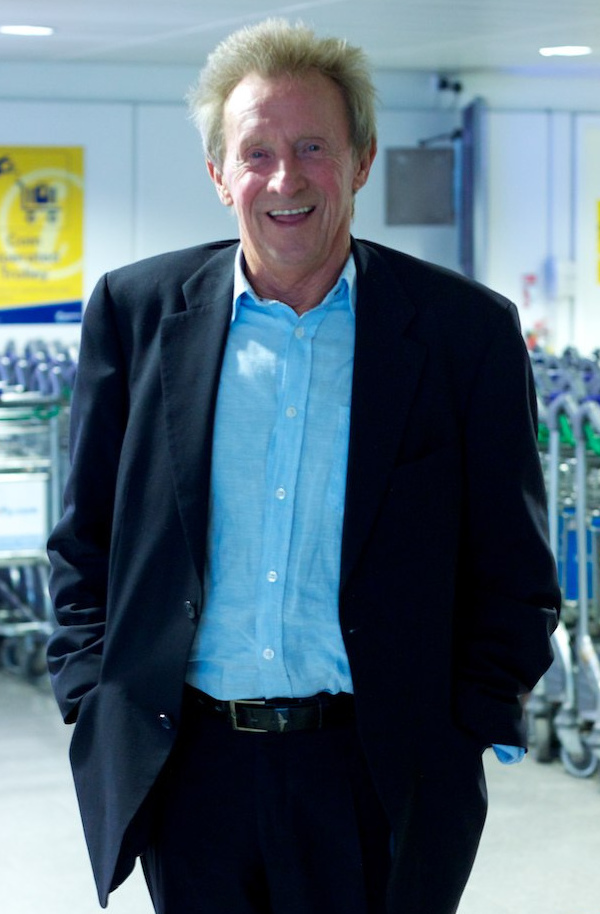
Denis Law, pictured in 2011

Denis Law was a Scottish footballer, who represented the Scotland national football team from 1958 to 1974. During that time he scored 30 international goals in 55 appearances. This made him the all-time top goalscorer for Scotland, a status he has held since scoring his 25th goal in 1966. The record was previously held by Hughie Gallacher, who scored 24 goals in 20 matches between 1924 and 1935. Law's record was equalled by Kenny Dalglish in 1984, and the two have been co-holders of the record ever since.

Law's goal tally included three hat-tricks: he scored four goals in a 5–1 win against Northern Ireland on 7 November 1962, three in a 4–3 win against Norway on 4 June 1963 and four in a 6–1 win against Norway on 7 November 1963. Law jointly holds the record for Scotland hat-tricks, with three, and he is the only player to have scored four goals or more in a game on more than one occasion.

Law is the only Scottish player to have won the Ballon d'Or, in 1964. He also finished fourth in the voting in 1963. Law only played in one major tournament finals for Scotland, as his career largely coincided with a long qualification drought between 1958 and 1974. He played in one match at the 1974 World Cup finals, a 2–0 win against Zaire, which was his 55th and final appearance for Scotland.

Scores and results list Scotland's goal tally first, score column indicates score after each Law goal.

List of international goals scored by Denis Law
No.	Cap	Date	Venue	Opponent	Score	Result	Competition	Ref.
1	1	18 October 1958	Ninian Park, Cardiff, Wales	Wales	3–0	3–0	1958–59 British Home Championship	
2	8	4 May 1960	Hampden Park, Glasgow, Scotland	Poland	1–1	2–3	Friendly	
3	10	9 November 1960	Hampden Park, Glasgow, Scotland	Northern Ireland	1–0	5–2	1960–61 British Home Championship	
4	12	29 September 1961	Hampden Park, Glasgow, Scotland	Czechoslovakia	2–2	3–2	1962 FIFA World Cup qualification	
5	12	29 September 1961	Hampden Park, Glasgow, Scotland	Czechoslovakia	3–2	3–2	1962 FIFA World Cup qualification	
6	15	20 October 1962	Ninian Park, Cardiff, Wales	Wales	2–1	3–2	1962–63 British Home Championship	
7	16	7 November 1962	Hampden Park, Glasgow, Scotland	Northern Ireland	1–1	5–1	1962–63 British Home Championship	
8	16	7 November 1962	Hampden Park, Glasgow, Scotland	Northern Ireland	2–1	5–1	1962–63 British Home Championship	
9	16	7 November 1962	Hampden Park, Glasgow, Scotland	Northern Ireland	3–1	5–1	1962–63 British Home Championship	
10	16	7 November 1962	Hampden Park, Glasgow, Scotland	Northern Ireland	5–1	5–1	1962–63 British Home Championship	
11	18	8 May 1963	Hampden Park, Glasgow, Scotland	Austria	3–0	4–1	Friendly	
12	18	8 May 1963	Hampden Park, Glasgow, Scotland	Austria	4–0	4–1	Friendly	
13	19	4 June 1963	Brann Stadion, Bergen, Norway	Norway	1–1	3–4	Friendly	
14	19	4 June 1963	Brann Stadion, Bergen, Norway	Norway	2–1	3–4	Friendly	
15	19	4 June 1963	Brann Stadion, Bergen, Norway	Norway	3–2	3–4	Friendly	
16	21	13 June 1963	Estadio Santiago Bernabéu, Madrid, Spain	Spain	1–1	6–2	Friendly	
17	22	7 November 1963	Hampden Park, Glasgow, Scotland	Norway	1–1	6–1	Friendly	
18	22	7 November 1963	Hampden Park, Glasgow, Scotland	Norway	2–1	6–1	Friendly	
19	22	7 November 1963	Hampden Park, Glasgow, Scotland	Norway	3–1	6–1	Friendly	
20	22	7 November 1963	Hampden Park, Glasgow, Scotland	Norway	6–1	6–1	Friendly	
21	23	20 November 1963	Hampden Park, Glasgow, Scotland	Wales	2–0	2–1	1963–64 British Home Championship	
22	27	21 October 1964	Hampden Park, Glasgow, Scotland	Finland	1–0	3–1	1966 FIFA World Cup qualification	
23	29	10 April 1965	Wembley Stadium, London, England	England	1–2	2–2	1964–65 British Home Championship	
24	31	23 May 1965	Silesian Stadium, Chorzów, Poland	Poland	1–1	1–1	1966 FIFA World Cup qualification	
25	35	2 April 1966	Hampden Park, Glasgow, Scotland	England	1–2	3–4	1965–66 British Home Championship	
26	36	22 October 1966	Ninian Park, Cardiff, Wales	Wales	1–1	1–1	1966–67 British Home Championship (Note: The 1966-67 and 1967-68 British Home Championship results were combined to form group 8 of UEFA Euro 1968 qualifying)	
27	37	15 April 1967	Wembley Stadium, London, England	England	1–0	3–2	1966–67 British Home Championship	
28	40	6 November 1968	Hampden Park, Glasgow, Scotland	Austria	1–1	2–1	1970 FIFA World Cup qualification	
29	43	26 April 1972	Hampden Park, Glasgow, Scotland	Peru	2–0	2–0	Friendly	
30	44	20 May 1972	Hampden Park, Glasgow, Scotland	Northern Ireland	2–0	2–0	1971–72 British Home Championship	

== Hat-tricks ==
No.	Date	Venue	Opponent	Goals	Result	Competition	Ref.
1	7 November 1962	Hampden Park, Glasgow, Scotland	Northern Ireland	4 – (40', 64', 77', 87')	5–1	1962–63 British Home Championship	
2	4 June 1963	Brann Stadion, Bergen, Norway	Norway	3 – (14', 22', 76')	3–4	Friendly	
3	7 November 1963	Hampden Park, Glasgow, Scotland	Norway	4 – (19', 42', 60', 78')	6–1	Friendly	

== Statistics ==
Caps and goals by year
Year	Apps	Goals
1958	2	1
1959	4	0
1960	4	2
1961	3	2
1962	3	5
1963	7	11
1964	5	1
1965	6	2
1966	2	2
1967	3	1
1968	1	1
1969	2	0
1970	—	
1971	—	
1972	7	2
1973	3	0
1974	3	0
Total	55	30

Caps and goals by competition
Competition	Caps	Goals
Friendlies	15	12
British Home Championship	23	11
Brazil Independence Cup	3	0
UEFA Euro qualifying	3	2
FIFA World Cup qualification	10	5
FIFA World Cup Finals	1	0
Total	55	30

Caps and goals by opponent
Opponent	Caps	Goals
Austria	3	3
Brazil	1	0
Czechoslovakia	5	2
England	9	3
Finland	2	1
Netherlands	1	0
Northern Ireland	10	6
Norway	2	7
Peru	1	1
Poland	3	2
Portugal	1	0
Republic of Ireland	1	0
Soviet Union	1	0
Spain	2	1
Wales	7	4
West Germany	4	0
Yugoslavia	1	0
Zaire	1	0
Total	55	30

== See also ==
- List of international goals scored by Kenny Dalglish
- Scotland national football team records and statistics
