= List of international goals scored by Clint Dempsey =

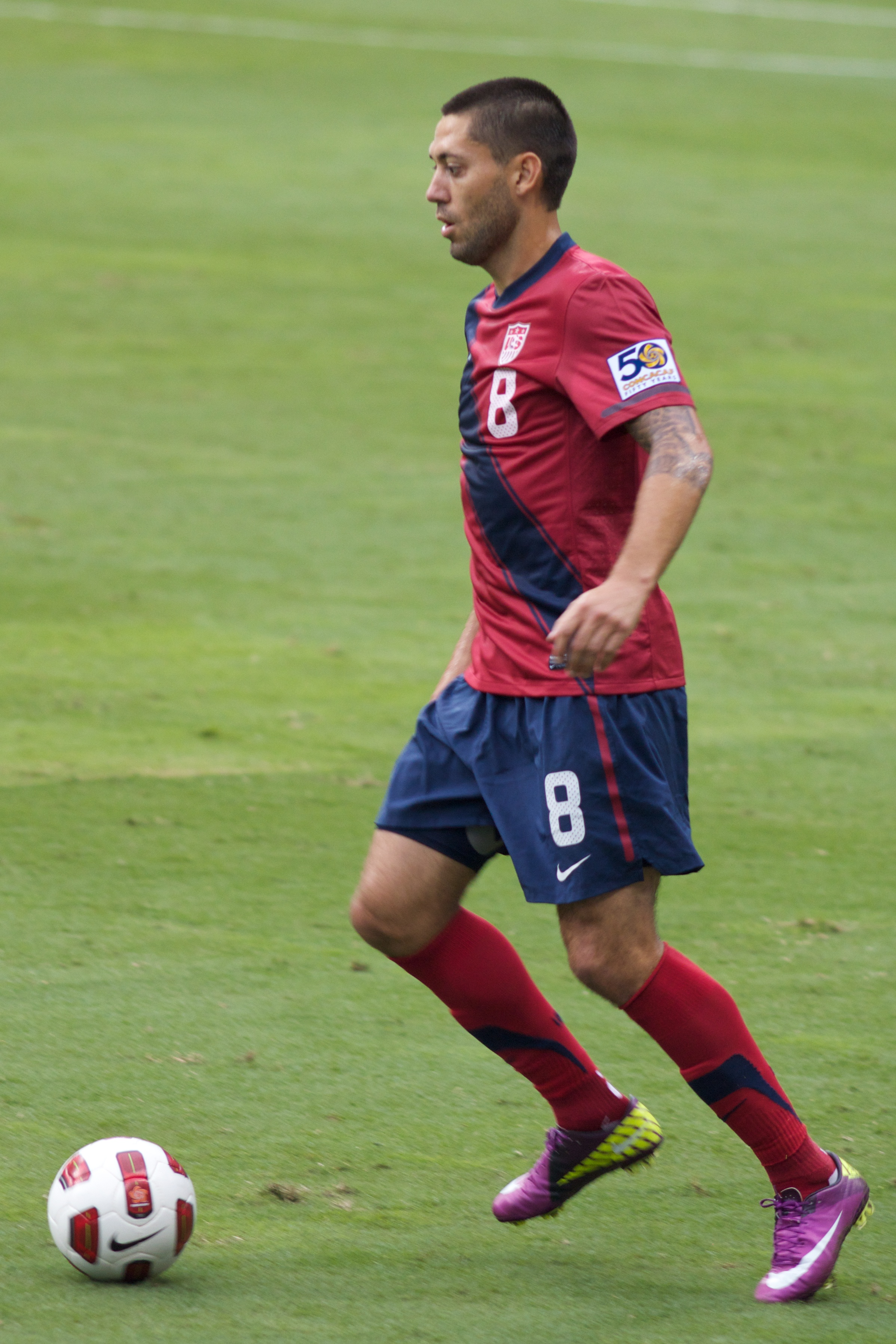
Clint Dempsey during a 2011 CONCACAF Gold Cup match in Houston, Texas

Clint Dempsey is an American retired professional soccer player who represented the United States in international competition. From 2004 to 2017, Dempsey appeared 141 times for the national team and scored 57 goals. He is the joint all-time male top scorer for the United States, having tied Landon Donovan and his 57 goals. He was also ranked third worldwide among active international male goalscorers in 2017, behind Cristiano Ronaldo (79) of Portugal and Lionel Messi (61) of Argentina.

Dempsey made his national team debut on November 17, 2004, during a World Cup qualifier against Jamaica in Columbus, Ohio; the call-up came after his rookie season in Major League Soccer with the New England Revolution, where he recorded seven goals and one assist on the way to being named MLS Rookie of the Year. Dempsey scored his first national team goal on May 28, 2005, during a friendly match against England in Chicago. His first competitive national team goal came a month later against Cuba in Seattle during the 2005 CONCACAF Gold Cup, a tournament the United States would go on to win.

Dempsey was named to the 2006 FIFA World Cup roster for the United States and scored the only American goal of the whole tournament, during a 2–1 loss to Ghana in the final group stage match. He scored three goals at the 2009 FIFA Confederations Cup, one each against Egypt, Spain, and Brazil, and helped lead the United States to a finish as runners-up. Dempsey's sole goal during the 2010 FIFA World Cup came in a 1–1 draw to England, making him the second American to score in multiple World Cups. During the opening match of the 2014 FIFA World Cup against Ghana, Dempsey scored 30 seconds after kickoff, the fifth-fastest goal in World Cup history; he also became the first American to score in three consecutive World Cups. He was the top goalscorer at the 2015 CONCACAF Gold Cup, scoring seven goals for the United States during their tournament victory and setting a record for most goals scored by an American at the Gold Cup. On July 22, 2017, during a 2017 CONCACAF Gold Cup semifinal against Costa Rica, Dempsey tied Landon Donovan's record for all-time top scorer with his 57th goal. Donovan himself called Dempsey's record "much more impressive", adding that Dempsey had scored fewer penalties and achieved the record in fewer caps.

During his national team career, Dempsey scored two hat-tricks: against Cuba in the 2015 CONCACAF Gold Cup and Honduras in a 2018 FIFA World Cup qualifier. The plurality of his goals came during FIFA World Cup qualification (18 goals), followed by friendly matches (16 goals) and the CONCACAF Gold Cup (13 goals). He has four World Cup goals in ten appearances, as well as three goals in the Confederations Cup and three goals in the Copa América.

== International goals ==
"Score" represents the score in the match after Dempsey's goal. "Score" and "Result" list the United States' goal tally first. Last updated October 10, 2017.

List of international goals scored by Clint Dempsey
No.	Date	Cap	Venue	Opponent	Score	Result	Competition	Ref.
1	May 28, 2005	6	Soldier Field, Chicago, United States	England	1–2	1–2	Friendly	
2	July 7, 2005	9	Qwest Field, Seattle, United States	Cuba	1–1	4–1	2005 CONCACAF Gold Cup	
3	February 10, 2006	17	AT&T Park, San Francisco, United States	Japan	2–0	3–2	Friendly	
4	March 1, 2006	18	Fritz-Walter-Stadion, Kaiserslautern, Germany	Poland	1–0	1–0	Friendly	
5	May 26, 2006	21	Cleveland Browns Stadium, Cleveland, United States	Venezuela	2–0	2–0	Friendly	
6	June 22, 2006	23	Frankenstadion, Nuremberg, Germany	Ghana	1–1	1–2	2006 FIFA World Cup	
7	June 2, 2007	27	Spartan Stadium, San Jose, United States	China	3–1	4–1	Friendly	
8	June 7, 2007	28	Home Depot Center, Carson, United States	Guatemala	1–0	1–0	2007 CONCACAF Gold Cup	
9	September 8, 2007	34	Soldier Field, Chicago, United States	Brazil	2–2	2–4	Friendly	
10	June 15, 2008	42	Home Depot Center, Carson, United States	Barbados	1–0	8–0	2010 FIFA World Cup qualification	
11	June 15, 2008	42	Home Depot Center, Carson, United States	Barbados	5–0	8–0	2010 FIFA World Cup qualification	
12	September 6, 2008	44	Estadio Pedro Marrero, Havana, Cuba	Cuba	1–0	1–0	2010 FIFA World Cup qualification	
13	September 10, 2008	45	Toyota Park, Bridgeview, United States	Trinidad and Tobago	2–0	3–0	2010 FIFA World Cup qualification	
14	June 21, 2009	54	Royal Bafokeng Stadium, Rustenburg, South Africa	Egypt	3–0	3–0	2009 FIFA Confederations Cup	
15	June 24, 2009	55	Free State Stadium, Bloemfontein, South Africa	Spain	2–0	2–0	2009 FIFA Confederations Cup	
16	June 28, 2009	56	Ellis Park Stadium, Johannesburg, South Africa	Brazil	1–0	2–3	2009 FIFA Confederations Cup	
17	September 5, 2009	58	Rio Tinto Stadium, Sandy, United States	El Salvador	1–1	2–1	2010 FIFA World Cup qualification	
18	May 29, 2010	61	Lincoln Financial Field, Philadelphia, United States	Turkey	2–1	2–1	Friendly	
19	June 12, 2010	63	Royal Bafokeng Stadium, Rustenburg, South Africa	England	1–1	1–1	2010 FIFA World Cup	
20	June 7, 2011	72	Ford Field, Detroit, United States	Canada	2–0	2–0	2011 CONCACAF Gold Cup	
21	June 19, 2011	75	Robert F. Kennedy Memorial Stadium, Washington, D.C., United States	Jamaica	2–0	2–0	2011 CONCACAF Gold Cup	
22	June 22, 2011	76	Reliant Stadium, Houston, United States	Panama	1–0	1–0	2011 CONCACAF Gold Cup	
23	October 8, 2011	79	Sun Life Stadium, Miami Gardens, United States	Honduras	1–0	1–0	Friendly	
24	November 15, 2011	82	Stadion Stožice, Ljubljana, Slovenia	Slovenia	2–1	3–2	Friendly	
25	February 29, 2012	83	Stadio Luigi Ferraris, Genoa, Italy	Italy	1–0	1–0	Friendly	
26	June 8, 2012	86	Raymond James Stadium, Tampa, United States	Antigua and Barbuda	2–0	3–1	2014 FIFA World Cup qualification	
27	June 12, 2012	87	Estadio Mateo Flores, Guatemala City, Guatemala	Guatemala	1–0	1–1	2014 FIFA World Cup qualification	
28	September 7, 2012	88	Independence Park, Kingston, Jamaica	Jamaica	1–0	1–2	2014 FIFA World Cup qualification	
29	October 16, 2012	91	Livestrong Sporting Park, Kansas City, United States	Guatemala	2–1	3–1	2014 FIFA World Cup qualification	
30	October 16, 2012	91	Livestrong Sporting Park, Kansas City, United States	Guatemala	3–1	3–1	2014 FIFA World Cup qualification	
31	February 6, 2013	92	Estadio Olímpico Metropolitano, San Pedro Sula, Honduras	Honduras	1–0	1–2	2014 FIFA World Cup qualification	
32	March 22, 2013	93	Dick's Sporting Goods Park, Commerce City, United States	Costa Rica	1–0	1–0	2014 FIFA World Cup qualification	
33	May 29, 2013	95	FirstEnergy Stadium, Cleveland, United States	Belgium	2–4	2–4	Friendly	
34	June 2, 2013	96	Robert F. Kennedy Memorial Stadium, Washington, D.C., United States	Germany	3–1	4–3	Friendly	
35	June 2, 2013	96	Robert F. Kennedy Memorial Stadium, Washington, D.C., United States	Germany	4–1	4–3	Friendly	
36	September 6, 2013	100	Estadio Nacional, San Jose, Costa Rica	Costa Rica	1–2	1–3	2014 FIFA World Cup qualification	
37	June 1, 2014	104	Red Bull Arena, Harrison, United States	Turkey	2–0	2–1	Friendly	
38	June 16, 2014	106	Arena das Dunas, Natal, Brazil	Ghana	1–0	2–1	2014 FIFA World Cup	
39	June 22, 2014	107	Arena da Amazônia, Manaus, Brazil	Portugal	2–1	2–2	2014 FIFA World Cup	
40	February 8, 2015	112	StubHub Center, Carson, United States	Panama	2–0	2–0	Friendly	
41	July 3, 2015	113	LP Field, Nashville, United States	Guatemala	3–0	4–0	Friendly	
42	July 7, 2015	114	Toyota Stadium, Frisco, United States	Honduras	1–0	2–1	2015 CONCACAF Gold Cup	
43	July 7, 2015	114	Toyota Stadium, Frisco, United States	Honduras	2–0	2–1	2015 CONCACAF Gold Cup	
44	July 10, 2015	115	Gillette Stadium, Foxborough, United States	Haiti	1–0	1–0	2015 CONCACAF Gold Cup	
45	July 18, 2015	117	M&T Bank Stadium, Baltimore, United States	Cuba	1–0	6–0	2015 CONCACAF Gold Cup	
46	July 18, 2015	117	M&T Bank Stadium, Baltimore, United States	Cuba	5–0	6–0	2015 CONCACAF Gold Cup	
47	July 18, 2015	117	M&T Bank Stadium, Baltimore, United States	Cuba	6–0	6–0	2015 CONCACAF Gold Cup	
48	July 25, 2015	119	PPL Park, Chester, United States	Panama	1–1	1–1	2015 CONCACAF Gold Cup	
49	March 29, 2016	122	MAPFRE Stadium, Columbus, United States	Guatemala	1–0	4–0	2018 FIFA World Cup qualification	
50	June 7, 2016	126	Soldier Field, Chicago, United States	Costa Rica	1–0	4–0	Copa América Centenario	
51	June 11, 2016	127	Lincoln Financial Field, Philadelphia, United States	Paraguay	1–0	1–0	Copa América Centenario	
52	June 16, 2016	128	CenturyLink Field, Seattle, United States	Ecuador	1–0	2–1	Copa América Centenario	
53	March 24, 2017	131	Avaya Stadium, San Jose, United States	Honduras	3–0	6–0	2018 FIFA World Cup qualification	
54	March 24, 2017	131	Avaya Stadium, San Jose, United States	Honduras	5–0	6–0	2018 FIFA World Cup qualification	
55	March 24, 2017	131	Avaya Stadium, San Jose, United States	Honduras	6–0	6–0	2018 FIFA World Cup qualification	
56	March 28, 2017	132	Estadio Rommel Fernández, Panama City, Panama	Panama	1–0	1–1	2018 FIFA World Cup qualification	
57	July 22, 2017	136	AT&T Stadium, Arlington, United States	Costa Rica	2–0	2–0	2017 CONCACAF Gold Cup	

== Statistics ==
Sources: RSSSF, Soccer America, ESPN

=== By year ===
Year	Caps	Goals
2004	1	0
2005	13	2
2006	9	4
2007	13	3
2008	10	4
2009	14	4
2010	8	2
2011	14	5
2012	9	6
2013	10	6
2014	9	3
2015	10	9
2016	10	4
2017	9	5
Total	141	57

=== By competition ===
Competition	Caps	Goals
FIFA World Cup qualification	41	18
FIFA World Cup tournaments	10	4
FIFA Confederations Cup tournaments	5	3
CONCACAF Gold Cup tournaments	25	13
Copa América	6	3
Friendlies	52	16
Total	141	57

== See also ==
- List of men's footballers with 50 or more international goals
- List of top international men's association football goal scorers by country
