= Fútbol de Primera Player of the Year =

Soccer award

The Fútbol de Primera Player of the Year, formerly known as the Honda Player of the Year, recognizes the best player on the United States Men's National Soccer Team, as chosen by the national sports media.

The award was established by Fútbol de Primera in 1991, with Hugo Pérez being the first recipient. To celebrate award's tenth anniversary

The original one-of-a-kind bronze trophy was created by Robert M. Garcia, an Argentinian-born master jeweller from the San Francisco Bay Area, California. Garcia hand-drew various male soccer players before selecting the design, and then used a centuries-old bronze sculpture-making technique to craft the unique and beautiful award.

This award should not be confused with the U.S. Soccer Athlete of the Year, given annually by the United States Soccer Federation.

== Winners ==
Fútbol de Primera Player of the Year
Year	Winner	2nd	3rd	Ref
1991	Hugo Pérez	Tony Meola	Marcelo Balboa	
1992	Eric Wynalda	Marcelo Balboa	Tab Ramos	
1993	Thomas Dooley	Alexi Lalas	Tab Ramos	
1994	Marcelo Balboa	Alexi Lalas	Tony Meola	
1995	Alexi Lalas	John Harkes	Marcelo Balboa	
1996	Eric Wynalda	Kasey Keller	Roy Lassiter	
1997	Eddie Pope	Claudio Reyna	Kasey Keller	
1998	Cobi Jones	Kasey Keller	Eddie Pope	
1999	Kasey Keller	Claudio Reyna	Cobi Jones	
2000	Claudio Reyna	Tony Meola	Joe-Max Moore	
2001	Earnie Stewart	Claudio Reyna	Jeff Agoos	
2002	Landon Donovan	Brad Friedel	Claudio Reyna	
2003	Landon Donovan	Brian McBride	Carlos Bocanegra	
2004	Landon Donovan	DaMarcus Beasley	Carlos Bocanegra	
2005	Kasey Keller	Landon Donovan	DaMarcus Beasley	
2006	Clint Dempsey	Kasey Keller	Brian McBride	
2007	Landon Donovan	Tim Howard	Carlos Bocanegra	
2008	Landon Donovan	Tim Howard	Clint Dempsey	
2009	Landon Donovan	Tim Howard	Jozy Altidore	
2010	Landon Donovan	Michael Bradley	Clint Dempsey	
2011	Clint Dempsey	Tim Howard	Landon Donovan	
2012	Clint Dempsey	Michael Bradley	Tim Howard	
2013	Jozy Altidore	Michael Bradley	Landon Donovan	
2014	Tim Howard	Jermaine Jones	Clint Dempsey	
2015	Michael Bradley	Clint Dempsey	Jozy Altidore	
2016	Jozy Altidore	Christian Pulisic	Michael Bradley	
2017	Christian Pulisic	Jozy Altidore	Michael Bradley	
