= List of international goals scored by Landon Donovan =

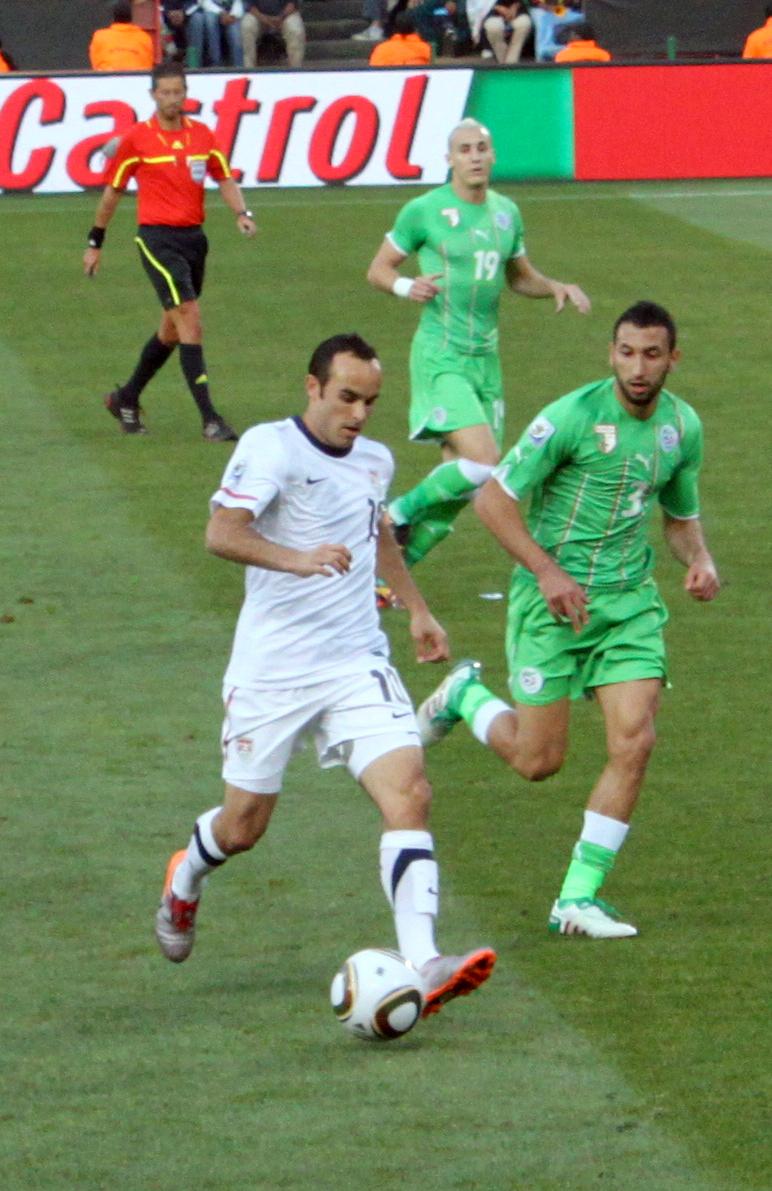
Landon Donovan playing for the United States against Algeria at the 2010 FIFA World Cup.

Landon Donovan is a professional soccer player who played for the United States men's national soccer team from 2000 to 2014. In his 157 appearances for the United States, he scored 57 goals, making him the country's all-time male top scorer. Since July 22, 2017, Donovan has been tied with Clint Dempsey as the all-time male top scorer.

Donovan scored in his debut for the United States, a 2–0 win over Mexico in a friendly played on October 25, 2000. His first competitive goal came on January 19, 2002, against South Korea in the 2002 CONCACAF Gold Cup. A few months later, he played in his first FIFA World Cup, scoring against Poland on June 14, 2002, and Mexico on June 17, 2002. During the 2006 FIFA World Cup qualification campaign, Donovan scored six goals to help the United States qualify for the 2006 FIFA World Cup, where he did not score.

On January 20, 2008, Donovan scored his 35th goal, against Sweden, surpassing Eric Wynalda to become the United States's all-time male top goalscorer. At the 2010 FIFA World Cup, Donovan scored three goals, against Slovenia and Algeria in the group stage and Ghana in the Round of 16. His goal against Algeria, which took the United States into the knockout round, was named the second most significant goal in United States history by Sports Illustrated in May 2014. Donovan scored five goals for the United States during their victory at the 2013 CONCACAF Gold Cup, sharing the top goalscorer award with American teammate Chris Wondolowski and Panamanian striker Gabriel Torres. Donovan retired from international soccer on October 10, 2014, having not participated in the 2014 FIFA World Cup.

Donovan scored three hat-tricks during his international career: against Cuba in the 2003 CONCACAF Gold Cup (where he scored four goals), against Ecuador in a 2007 friendly, and against Scotland in a 2012 friendly. The plurality of Donovan's goals came in friendlies, with 19 in 63 caps. He scored most of his competitive goals in the CONCACAF Gold Cup, at 18 in 34 matches, followed by FIFA World Cup qualification at 13 in 40 matches. Donovan scored five goals in 12 FIFA World Cup matches at the 2002 and 2010 editions. He also scored twice during the 2009 FIFA Confederations Cup, including once in the final against Brazil.

== International goals ==
"Score" represents the score in the match after Donovan's goal. "Score" and "Result" list the United States' goal tally first.

List of international goals scored by Landon Donovan
No.	Date	Cap	Venue	Opponent	Score	Result	Competition	Ref.
1	October 25, 2000	1	Los Angeles Memorial Coliseum, Los Angeles, U.S.	Mexico	1–0	2–0	Friendly	
2	January 19, 2002	10	Rose Bowl, Pasadena, U.S.	South Korea	1–0	2–1	2002 CONCACAF Gold Cup	
3	March 2, 2002	16	Safeco Field, Seattle, U.S.	Honduras	2–0	4–0	Friendly	
4	March 2, 2002	16	Safeco Field, Seattle, U.S.	Honduras	4–0	4–0	Friendly	
5	May 16, 2002	22	Giants Stadium, East Rutherford, U.S.	Jamaica	4–0	5–0	Friendly	
6	June 14, 2002	26	Daejeon World Cup Stadium, Daejeon, South Korea	Poland	1–3	1–3	2002 FIFA World Cup	
7	June 17, 2002	27	Jeonju World Cup Stadium, Jeonju, South Korea	Mexico	2–0	2–0	2002 FIFA World Cup	
8	March 29, 2003	33	Seahawks Stadium, Seattle, U.S.	Venezuela	2–0	2–0	Friendly	
9	May 26, 2003	35	Spartan Stadium, San Jose, U.S.	Wales	1–0	2–0	Friendly	
10	July 6, 2003	39	Columbus Crew Stadium, Columbus, U.S.	Paraguay	1–0	2–0	Friendly	
11	July 19, 2003	42	Gillette Stadium, Foxborough, U.S.	Cuba	1–0	5–0	2003 CONCACAF Gold Cup	
12	July 19, 2003	42	Gillette Stadium, Foxborough, U.S.	Cuba	2–0	5–0	2003 CONCACAF Gold Cup	
13	July 19, 2003	42	Gillette Stadium, Foxborough, U.S.	Cuba	4–0	5–0	2003 CONCACAF Gold Cup	
14	July 19, 2003	42	Gillette Stadium, Foxborough, U.S.	Cuba	5–0	5–0	2003 CONCACAF Gold Cup	
15	January 18, 2004	45	The Home Depot Center, Carson, U.S.	Denmark	1–1	1–1	Friendly	
16	June 20, 2004	51	Grenada National Stadium, St. George's, Grenada	Grenada	1–0	3–2	2006 FIFA World Cup qualification	
17	September 4, 2004	54	Gillette Stadium, Foxborough, U.S.	El Salvador	2–0	2–0	2006 FIFA World Cup qualification	
18	October 13, 2004	57	RFK Stadium, Washington, D.C., U.S.	Panama	1–0	6–0	2006 FIFA World Cup qualification	
19	October 13, 2004	57	RFK Stadium, Washington, D.C., U.S.	Panama	2–0	6–0	2006 FIFA World Cup qualification	
20	June 4, 2005	63	Rice–Eccles Stadium, Salt Lake City, U.S.	Costa Rica	1–0	3–0	2006 FIFA World Cup qualification	
21	June 4, 2005	63	Rice–Eccles Stadium, Salt Lake City, U.S.	Costa Rica	2–0	3–0	2006 FIFA World Cup qualification	
22	June 8, 2005	64	Estadio Rommel Fernández, Panama City, Panama	Panama	2–0	3–0	2006 FIFA World Cup qualification	
23	July 7, 2005	65	Qwest Field, Seattle, U.S.	Cuba	2–1	4–1	2005 CONCACAF Gold Cup	
24	July 7, 2005	65	Qwest Field, Seattle, U.S.	Cuba	4–1	4–1	2005 CONCACAF Gold Cup	
25	July 9, 2005	66	Qwest Field, Seattle, U.S.	Canada	2–0	2–0	2005 CONCACAF Gold Cup	
26	January 20, 2007	85	The Home Depot Center, Carson, U.S.	Denmark	1–1	3–1	Friendly	
27	February 7, 2007	86	University of Phoenix Stadium, Glendale, U.S.	Mexico	2–0	2–0	Friendly	
28	March 25, 2007	87	Raymond James Stadium, Tampa, U.S.	Ecuador	1–0	3–1	Friendly	
29	March 25, 2007	87	Raymond James Stadium, Tampa, U.S.	Ecuador	2–1	3–1	Friendly	
30	March 25, 2007	87	Raymond James Stadium, Tampa, U.S.	Ecuador	3–1	3–1	Friendly	
31	June 12, 2007	91	Gillette Stadium, Foxborough, U.S.	El Salvador	2–0	4–0	2007 CONCACAF Gold Cup	
32	June 16, 2007	92	Gillette Stadium, Foxborough, U.S.	Panama	1–0	2–1	2007 CONCACAF Gold Cup	
33	June 21, 2007	93	Soldier Field, Chicago, U.S.	Canada	2–0	2–1	2007 CONCACAF Gold Cup	
34	June 24, 2007	94	Soldier Field, Chicago, U.S.	Mexico	1–1	2–1	2007 CONCACAF Gold Cup	
35	January 19, 2008	97	The Home Depot Center, Carson, U.S.	Sweden	2–0	2–0	Friendly	
36	June 15, 2008	101	The Home Depot Center, Carson, U.S.	Barbados	4–0	8–0	2010 FIFA World Cup qualification	
37	October 11, 2008	105	RFK Stadium, Washington, D.C., U.S.	Cuba	3–1	6–1	2010 FIFA World Cup qualification	
38	June 3, 2009	109	Estadio Ricardo Saprissa Aymá, San José, Costa Rica	Costa Rica	1–3	1–3	2010 FIFA World Cup qualification	
39	June 6, 2009	110	Soldier Field, Chicago, U.S.	Honduras	1–1	2–1	2010 FIFA World Cup qualification	
40	June 15, 2009	111	Loftus Versfeld Stadium, Pretoria, South Africa	Italy	1–0	1–3	2009 FIFA Confederations Cup	
41	June 28, 2009	115	Coca-Cola Park, Johannesburg, South Africa	Brazil	2–0	2–3	2009 FIFA Confederations Cup	
42	October 10, 2009	119	Estadio Olímpico Metropolitano, San Pedro Sula, Honduras	Honduras	3–1	3–2	2010 FIFA World Cup qualification	
43	June 18, 2010	125	Ellis Park Stadium, Johannesburg, South Africa	Slovenia	1–2	2–2	2010 FIFA World Cup	
44	June 23, 2010	126	Loftus Versfeld Stadium, Pretoria, South Africa	Algeria	1–0	1–0	2010 FIFA World Cup	
45	June 26, 2010	127	Royal Bafokeng Stadium, Rustenburg, South Africa	Ghana	1–1	1–2	2010 FIFA World Cup	
46	June 25, 2011	136	Rose Bowl, Pasadena, U.S.	Mexico	2–0	2–4	2011 CONCACAF Gold Cup	
47	May 26, 2012	139	EverBank Field, Jacksonville, U.S.	Scotland	1–0	5–1	Friendly	
48	May 26, 2012	139	EverBank Field, Jacksonville, U.S.	Scotland	3–1	5–1	Friendly	
49	May 26, 2012	139	EverBank Field, Jacksonville, U.S.	Scotland	4–1	5–1	Friendly	
50	July 5, 2013	145	Qualcomm Stadium, San Diego, U.S.	Guatemala	2–0	6–0	Friendly	
51	July 5, 2013	145	Qualcomm Stadium, San Diego, U.S.	Guatemala	4–0	6–0	Friendly	
52	July 9, 2013	146	Jeld-Wen Field, Portland, U.S.	Belize	6–1	6–1	2013 CONCACAF Gold Cup	
53	July 13, 2013	147	Rio Tinto Stadium, Sandy, U.S.	Cuba	1–1	4–1	2013 CONCACAF Gold Cup	
54	July 21, 2013	149	M&T Bank Stadium, Baltimore, U.S.	El Salvador	4–1	5–1	2013 CONCACAF Gold Cup	
55	July 24, 2013	150	Cowboys Stadium, Arlington, U.S.	Honduras	2–0	3–1	2013 CONCACAF Gold Cup	
56	July 24, 2013	150	Cowboys Stadium, Arlington, U.S.	Honduras	3–1	3–1	2013 CONCACAF Gold Cup	
57	September 10, 2013	153	Columbus Crew Stadium, Columbus, U.S.	Mexico	2–0	2–0	2014 FIFA World Cup qualification	

== Statistics ==
Sources: RSSSF and US Soccer

=== By year ===
Year	Caps	Goals
2000	1	1
2001	8	0
2002	20	6
2003	15	7
2004	14	5
2005	15	6
2006	11	0
2007	12	9
2008	9	3
2009	15	5
2010	8	3
2011	10	1
2012	6	3
2013	10	8
2014	3	0
Total	157	57

=== By competition ===
Competition	Caps	Goals
FIFA World Cup qualification	40	13
FIFA World Cup tournaments	12	5
FIFA Confederations Cup tournaments	8	2
CONCACAF Gold Cup tournaments	34	18
Friendlies	63	19
Total	157	57

== See also ==
- List of men's footballers with 50 or more international goals
