= Landon Donovan =

American soccer player (born 1982)

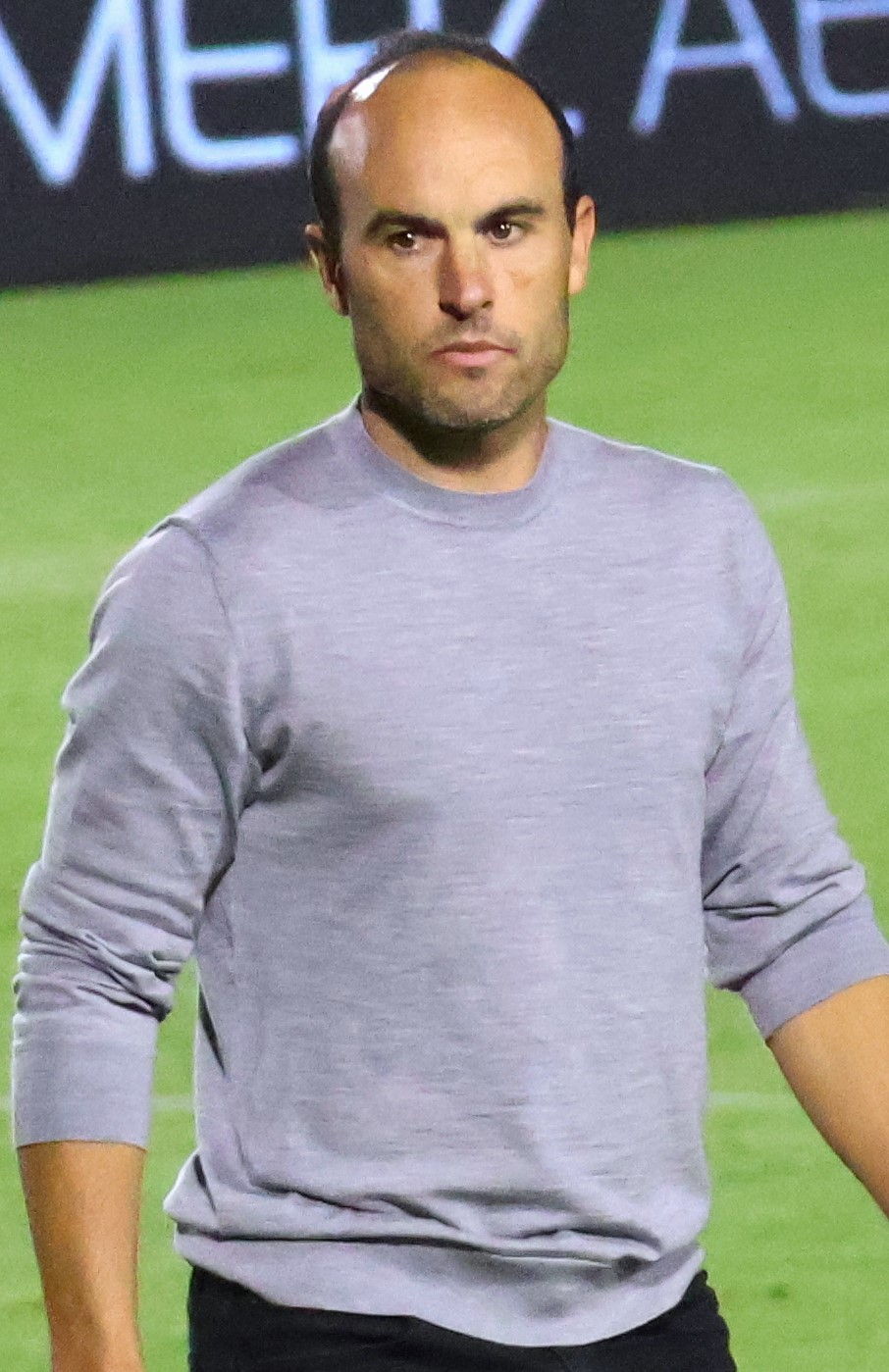
- Donovan in 2024

Personal information
- Full name: Landon Timothy Donovan
- Date of birth: March 4, 1982 (age 44)
- Place of birth: Ontario, California, U.S.
- Height: 5 ft 8 in (1.73 m)
- Positions: Winger; forward

Youth career
- 1999: IMG Academy

Senior career*
Years	Team	Apps	(Gls)
1999–2000	Bayer Leverkusen II	28	(9)
2000–2005	Bayer Leverkusen	7	(0)
2001–2004	→ San Jose Earthquakes (loan)	87	(32)
2005–2015	LA Galaxy	247	(112)
2009	→ Bayern Munich (loan)	6	(0)
2010	→ Everton (loan)	10	(2)
2012	→ Everton (loan)	7	(0)
2016-2017	LA Galaxy	6	(1)
2018	León	6	(0)
2018–2019	San Diego Sockers (indoor)	10	(5)
Total		416	(161)

International career
1998–1999	United States U17	41	(35)
2001	United States U20	4	(0)
2000–2004	United States U23	15	(9)
2000–2014	United States	157	(57)
2019	United States (indoor)	1	(0)

Managerial career
- 2020–2022: San Diego Loyal
- 2024: San Diego Wave (interim)
Medal record
Men's soccer
Representing United States
FIFA Confederations Cup
Runner-up	2009 South Africa
CONCACAF Gold Cup
Winner	2002 United States
Winner	2005 United States
Winner	2007 United States
Winner	2013 United States
Runner-up	2011 United States
Third place	2003 United States–Mexico
- * Club domestic league appearances and goals

Landon Timothy Donovan (born March 4, 1982) is an American former professional soccer player and coach who played as a winger or forward. He most recently was the interim head coach of San Diego Wave FC of the National Women's Soccer League (NWSL). Widely regarded as one of the greatest American players in history and as the greatest U.S. men's national team player of all time, Donovan was the all-time top assist provider in international football (58) until 2023 and is tied with Clint Dempsey for the most international goals scored by a male U.S. player (57). Donovan won a record six MLS Cups and is the league's all-time assists leader with 136. The Major League Soccer MVP Award has been renamed the Landon Donovan MVP Award in his honor.

An early soccer product of IMG Academy, Donovan signed for Bundesliga club Bayer Leverkusen in 1999, though the majority of his club time was spent on loan with the San Jose Earthquakes of MLS, winning the MLS Cup in 2001 and 2003. In 2005, Donovan moved back to the United States permanently to sign with the Los Angeles Galaxy, winning the MLS Cup in 2005 and the MLS Golden Boot in 2008. In 2009, he returned to Germany for a loan with league champions Bayern Munich, and twice went on short loans to Premier League club Everton in 2010 and 2012, winning his fourth MLS Cup between the loans in 2011. He returned to the LA Galaxy and won the MLS Cup twice more in 2012 and 2014. He retired as a player in 2014, but made a brief comeback with Galaxy late in the 2016 season and then in 2018 to play for Mexican club León. He further played one season with the San Diego Sockers of the Major Arena Soccer League.

Donovan represented his country in several youth levels; winning the Golden Ball of the 1999 FIFA U-17 World Cup. He made his senior debut for the United States national team in 2000. He is the all-time leader in assists, tied with Clint Dempsey as the all-time leader in scoring, and is the second-most capped player of his country (157). He is the only American player to reach the 50 goals/50 assists mark. He starred in the U.S. team that reached the quarter-finals of the 2002 FIFA World Cup where he received the FIFA Best Young Player Award, becoming the first and only North American (CONCACAF) recipient, and was named to the FIFA World Cup All-Star Team as a reserve. He is the highest-scoring American player in World Cup history (5), scoring in the 2002 and 2010 editions. Donovan was runner-up of the 2009 FIFA Confederations Cup and scored in the final. He won the CONCACAF Gold Cup in 2002, 2005, 2007, and 2013; winning the MVP award of the 2013 edition and the Golden Boot award of the 2003, 2005, and 2013 editions. Individually, he is tied for the record of four U.S. Soccer Player of the Year awards with Christian Pulisic, and is the only seven-time winner of the Fútbol de Primera Player of the Year award. Donovan was inducted into the National Soccer Hall of Fame in 2023.

== Early life and education ==
Landon Timothy Donovan was born (along with twin sister Tristan) on March 4, 1982, in Ontario, California, to Donna Kenney-Cash, an American special education teacher, and Tim Donovan, a semi-professional ice hockey player originally from Canada. Donovan's parents are both of Irish descent, and he holds Canadian citizenship by way of his father. His mother raised Landon and his siblings in Redlands, California, and he attended Redlands East Valley High School when not engaged in soccer activities elsewhere.

Donovan first played soccer with his older brother and when Donovan was six, his mother allowed him to join an organized league, where he scored seven goals in his first match. Donovan was a member of Cal Heat – a club based in nearby Rancho Cucamonga, California. In 1997, he was accepted into U.S. Youth Soccer's Olympic Development Program. In 1999 Donovan attended the IMG Academy in Bradenton, Florida, with other members of the U-17 national team as part of U.S. Soccer's youth development program. Donovan was a member of the inaugural class of the U.S. Soccer youth residency program in Bradenton, Florida. He was named Player of the Tournament for his role in the United States under-17 squad that finished fourth in the 1999 FIFA U-17 World Championship before signing with German club Bayer Leverkusen later that year.

== Club career ==
=== Bayer Leverkusen and San Jose Earthquakes ===
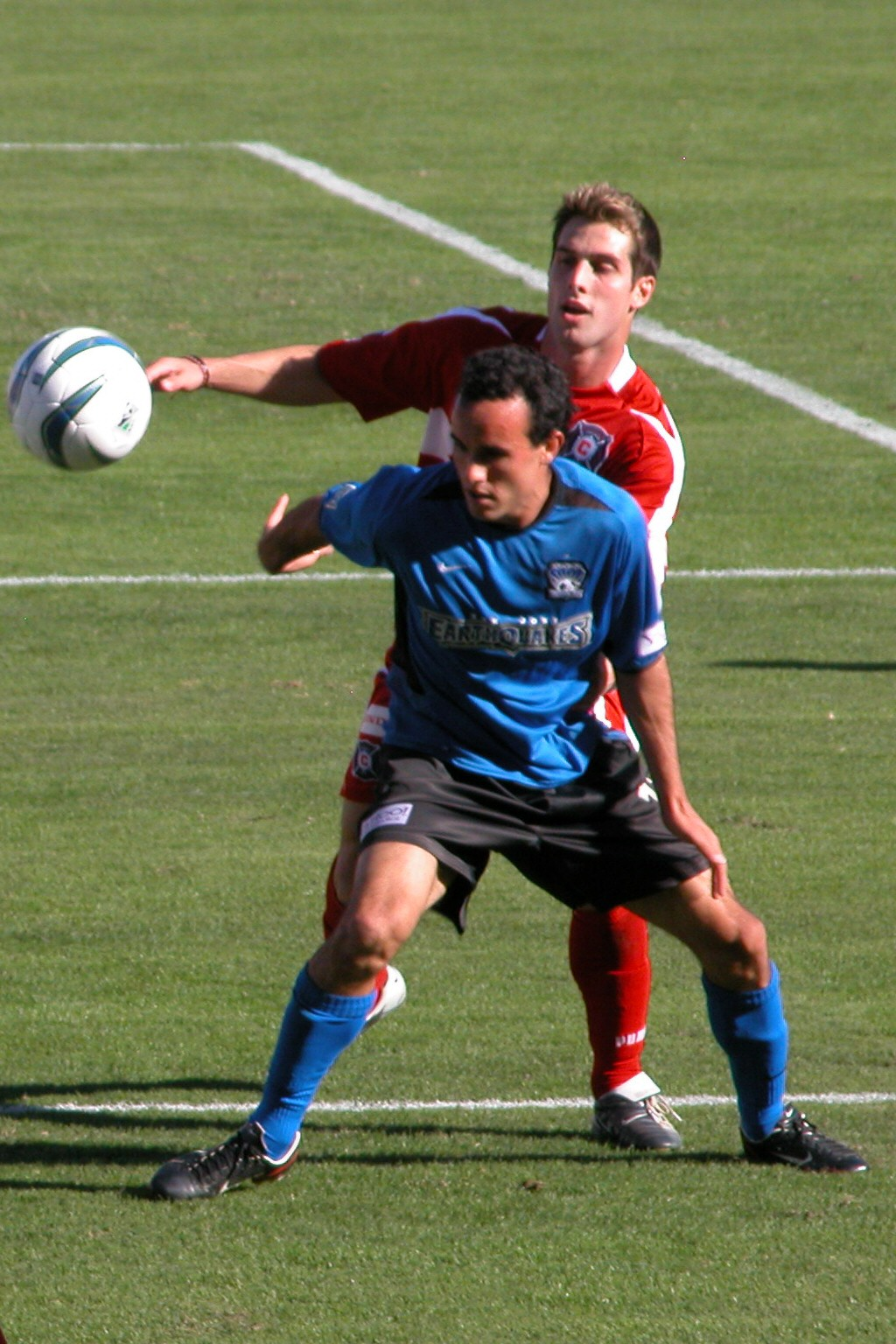
Donovan with the San Jose Earthquakes at the 2003 MLS Cup

Later in 1999, Donovan signed a six-year contract for German Bundesliga club Bayer Leverkusen, whose sporting director Michael Reschke spotted him at a youth tournament in Europe. Despite becoming a regular starter for the club's reserve team upon arrival, Donovan had trouble adapting to life overseas and was allowed extended training periods with United States youth national teams. He played in a German Cup match for the reserve team. Unhappy with his situation with Leverkusen, Donovan was loaned to the San Jose Earthquakes of Major League Soccer (MLS) for the 2001 season. In MLS, Donovan had immediate success, leading the Earthquakes to MLS Cup championships in 2001 and 2003 and becoming one of the only recognizable faces of soccer in the United States. In four years in the league, he scored 32 goals and 29 assists in league play, and ten goals and six assists in the playoffs. Two of those goals were in the 2003 MLS Cup, a 4–2 Earthquakes triumph over the Chicago Fire. Donovan was named most valuable player for his actions. He was named U.S. Soccer Athlete of the Year in 2003.

In 2004, Donovan became the first man to be named the U.S. Soccer Athlete of the Year three years in a row before returning to the Bayer Leverkusen first team in January 2005. After playing seven matches with Leverkusen in the 2004–05 season, only two of which were starts, Donovan requested to leave the club. Despite a late offer from English Premier League club Portsmouth, Donovan expressed a desire to return to the United States. Upon his re-entry to MLS, San Jose was denied the chance to re-sign Donovan because Earthquakes general manager Alexi Lalas had traded away his rights. LA Galaxy, his hometown team, were able to trade leading scorer Carlos Ruiz to FC Dallas to get on top of the MLS allocation order as Donovan prepared to leave Germany.

=== LA Galaxy ===
==== 2005–2014 ====
Donovan signed a multi-year contract with LA Galaxy, making him the highest-paid American player in the league. In his first season at the club, Donovan scored 12 league goals with 10 assists and added four goals and an assist in the playoffs as the LA Galaxy won the MLS Cup (his third MLS championship to date). He was named to the MLS All-Time Best XI after the season. In his second season with LA Galaxy, Donovan scored 12 league goals and eight assists. He also scored three goals in the Open Cup. Despite this, Donovan and the LA Galaxy failed to make the playoffs and lost in the Open Cup to the Chicago Fire. Donovan's playoff goals make him MLS' second all-time leading scorer in the playoffs with 14, behind Carlos Ruiz's 15.

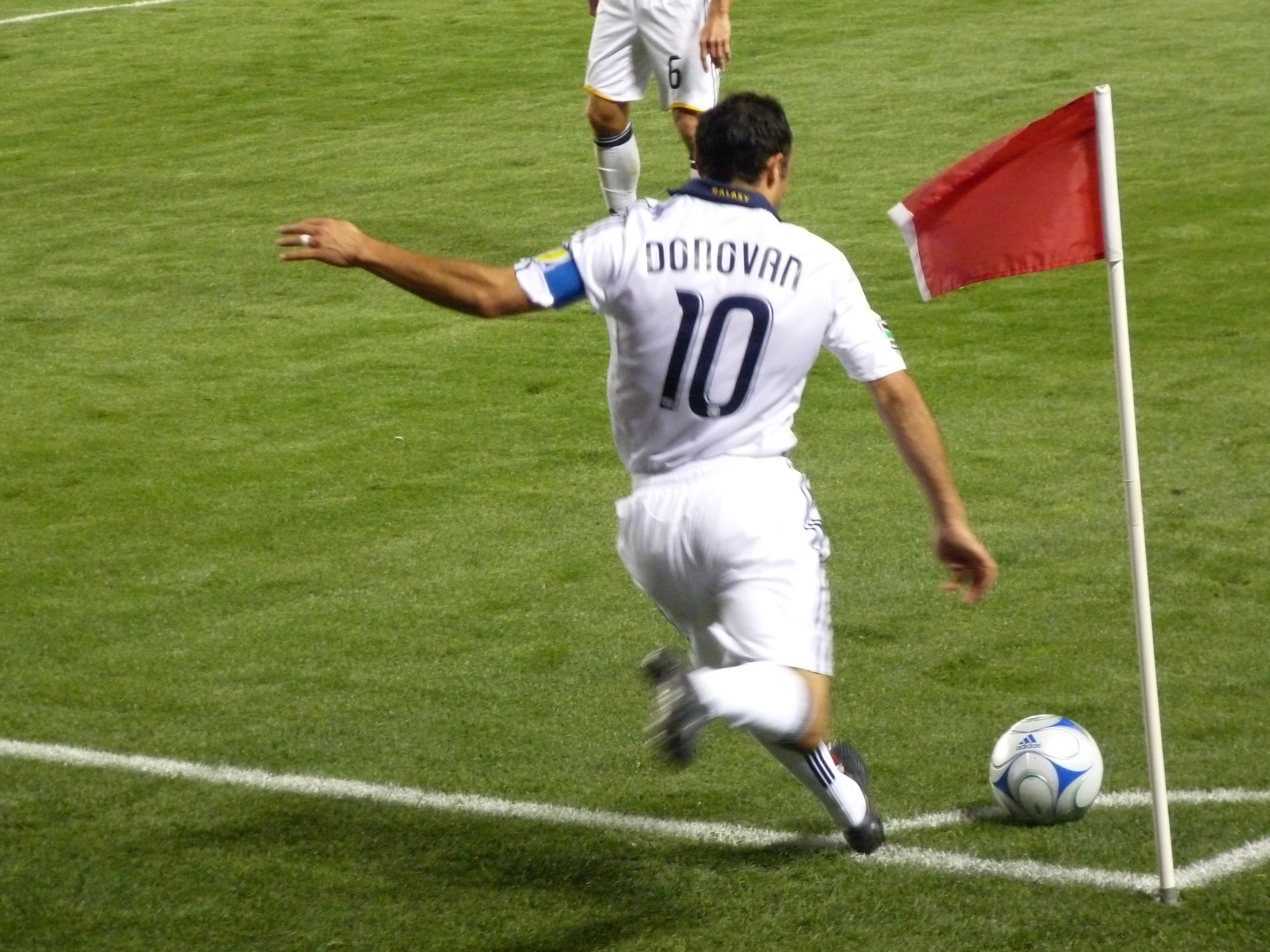
Donovan taking a corner kick for LA Galaxy

Donovan had a mixed year with the LA Galaxy in 2007. Upon the signing and arrival of David Beckham, Donovan relinquished his captaincy to the English superstar. In the 2007 SuperLiga tournament, Donovan was the top scorer. He scored a goal in every match except for the final. He scored six goals in five matches. At this point in his career, Donovan had 84 all-time regular season goals putting him in seventh place on the league's all-time scoring list. Although the 2008 season was a disappointment for the LA Galaxy, it was a banner year for Donovan as he scored 20 goals and nine assists in 25 matches, forming a strong offensive partnership with David Beckham and Edson Buddle.

After his former national team manager Bruce Arena was named LA Galaxy head coach and Beckham joined Milan on loan in early 2009, Donovan once again was given the club captaincy on a permanent basis. In July 2009, Donovan received praise and criticism for his critical comments about Beckham in Sports Illustrated journalist Grant Wahl's book The Beckham Experiment, calling Beckham a poor captain and teammate. He later apologized to Beckham for discussing his concerns to a reporter rather than to him directly. The two reconciled upon Beckham's mid-season return to Los Angeles and Donovan enjoyed an outstanding 2009 campaign, winning the league's Most Valuable Player and MLS Goal of The Year 2009 award and leading the LA Galaxy to MLS Cup 2009, which they lost 5–4 on penalties to Real Salt Lake after a 1–1 draw, Donovan missing his attempt in the shootout. Following the season, Donovan agreed to a four-year extension to his contract with the LA Galaxy, with clauses that allowed him to seek loans during the MLS offseason. On August 1, 2010, Donovan scored the 100th goal of his MLS career. On September 18, 2010, he became the all-time leading scorer for LA Galaxy.

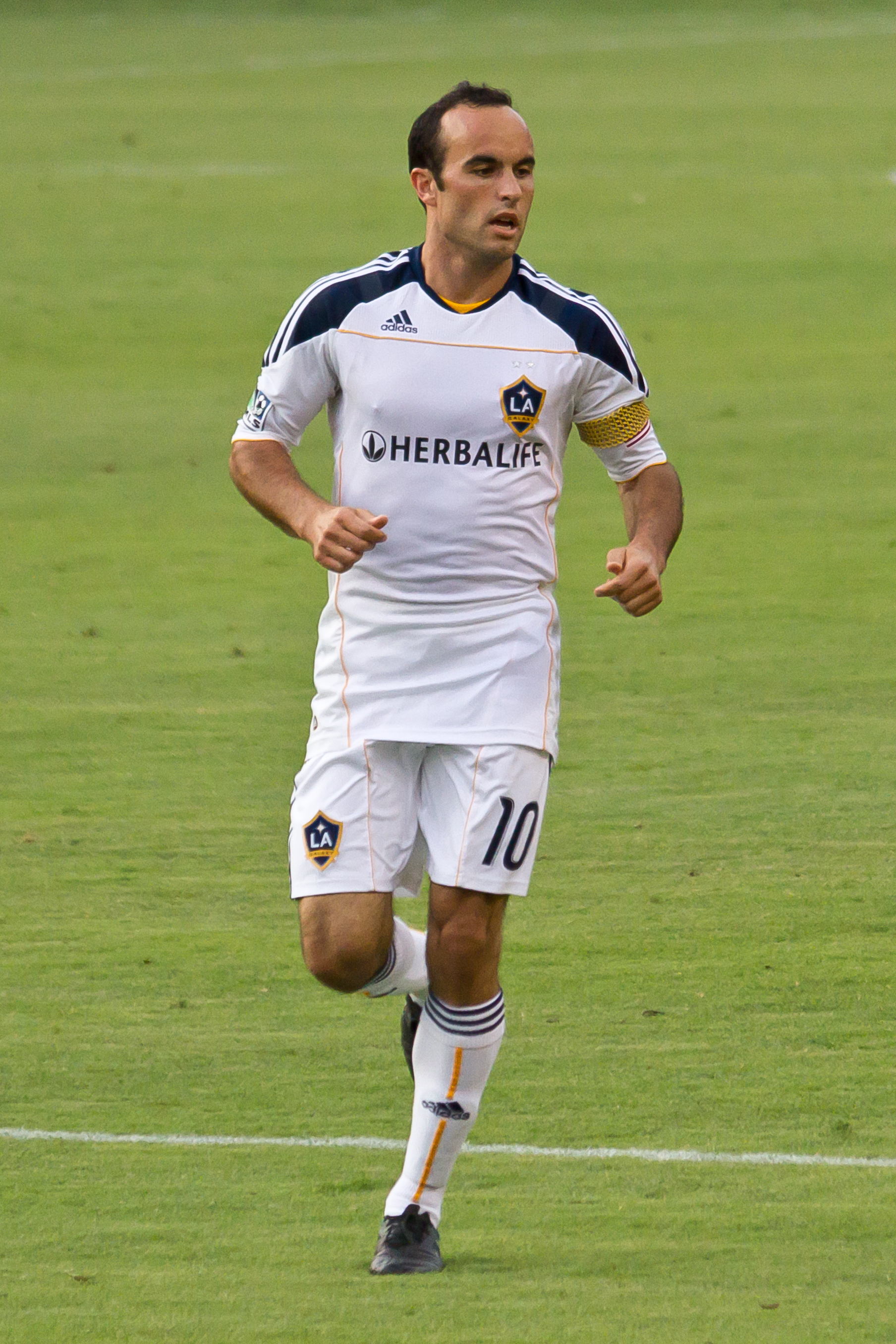
Donovan with the Galaxy in 2010

LA Galaxy had another successful campaign in 2010 winning the Supporters' Shield for the first time since 2003. In that campaign, Donovan scored seven goals and a team-high 16 assists. In the playoffs, the LA Galaxy would ultimately succumb to Dallas in the semi-finals. In 2011, the LA Galaxy again won the MLS Supporter's Shield. In the MLS Cup 2011, Donovan scored the title-clinching goal in the 72nd minute over the Houston Dynamo, securing his fourth MLS Cup title. Donovan was named the MLS Cup MVP for a second time.

In October 2012, Donovan expressed his desire to take a break from his professional soccer career, citing physical and mental exhaustion as the main reasons. In LA Galaxy's next match, the MLS Cup 2012, a rematch with Houston, Donovan converted a penalty kick in the 65th minute of play to give LA a 2–1 lead. The goal was Donovan's fifth in MLS Cup finals. The LA Galaxy went on to win their second straight MLS Cup, 3–1.

Donovan returned to training with the LA Galaxy on March 25, 2013, and made his season debut five days later against Toronto FC, coming on as a 61st-minute substitute. However, upon his return, it was announced he would be forced to relinquish the captaincy to Robbie Keane for the 2013 season. He scored two goals against Chivas USA, tying him with Jeff Cunningham together as the top MLS goalscorer with 134 goals. On May 25, 2014, Donovan scored twice against the Philadelphia Union to break Cunningham's record of 134, making Donovan the league's all-time leading scorer with 136 goals. On August 6, 2014, he scored the winning goal at the 2014 MLS All-Star Game, putting the ball past Bayern Munich goalkeeper Manuel Neuer at the 70th minute, he was subsequently substituted for Sporting Kansas City striker Dom Dwyer and gave the captain's armband to Canadian international Will Johnson. On August 7, 2014, Donovan announced he would be retiring at the end of the 2014 Major League Soccer season; the season ended with the LA Galaxy winning MLS Cup 2014, as well their fourth MLS Cup of the Donovan era, on December 7, 2014.

==== Loans to other clubs ====
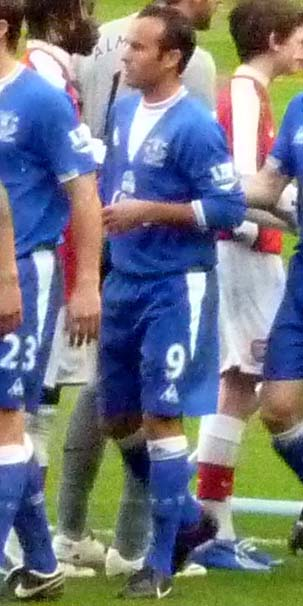
Donovan before his Everton debut against Arsenal

In November 2008, Donovan trained with Bayern Munich, before joining the German club on loan until the start of the 2009 MLS season in mid-March. During his stay with Bayern, Donovan had appearances in five friendly matches, in which he scored four goals, six league matches and one DFB-Pokal match. At the end of the loan period, Bayern declined to extend his loan.

After the 2009 MLS season had finished, Donovan joined English Premier League side Everton on loan in January 2010, though there was strong suggestions he could join his American teammates at Fulham. During this period, he played in 13 matches in all competitions, scored two goals and was named the club's Player of the Month for January. Everton were keen on extending his loan deal, but the LA Galaxy refused, and Donovan returned to the U.S. in time for the start of the 2010 MLS season.

An agreement was reached in December 2011 for Donovan to spend another two months at Everton beginning in January 2012. He made his returning debut on January 4, 2012, against Bolton Wanderers, a 2–1 defeat. In his third match on loan, he assisted Everton's only goal in a 1–1 draw against Aston Villa on January 14. On January 27, he assisted in both goals in a 2–1 win over Fulham in the FA Cup fourth round proper. On January 31, he assisted in Darron Gibson's winning goal over Manchester City. Donovan took his tally of assists to seven when he assisted Denis Stracqualursi's goal in a 2–0 victory over Chelsea on February 11.

=== Return to LA Galaxy ===
On September 8, 2016, Donovan announced his return from retirement and officially signed with the LA Galaxy for the remainder of the 2016 season (six regular season games and any consecutive play-off matches).

Donovan explained that the injuries sustained by the club late in the season led to his decision to return:

Two weeks ago, I was working as an analyst on the LA Galaxy vs. Vancouver Whitecaps match and during that game, LA Galaxy suffered injuries to three players: Jelle Van Damme, Steven Gerrard and Gyasi Zardes. Over the next few days, Nigel De Jong was transferred to Galatasaray and news broke that Gyasi would be out for the rest of the season.

Since my retirement, I have remained in close contact with many of the staff and players on LA Galaxy. I spoke with some of them that week and they jokingly asked if I was ready to make a return to the field to help fill some of the void left by the injuries and departures.

I reminded them that I haven't played a meaningful soccer game in almost two years and I certainly couldn't fill the holes left by those players. Over the ensuing days, I began to think about their inquiries and it struck me that perhaps this is something I should consider. I care so deeply about the Galaxy organization, and I believe I could help in a small way to aid the team in its quest for a sixth MLS championship.

On September 11, 2016, Donovan entered the match against Orlando City as a substitute on the 83rd minute. As his traditional number 10 was worn by Giovani dos Santos, Donovan selected number 26, which he wore at Bayer Leverkusen when he began his career in 1999.

Donovan scored a goal in his second match after returning to LA Galaxy. On September 18, 2016, he came on as a substitute in the 74th minute in a match against Sporting Kansas City and scored two minutes later to tie the game 2–2.

Altogether, Donovan played in all six remaining matches of the 2016 regular season, as well as in all three play-off matches. He started in five of them and scored one goal. At the end of the play-off run, Donovan retired for the second time.

=== León ===
On January 12, 2018, Donovan signed with Liga MX team León, having returned from retirement for a second time. He made his Liga MX debut on February 10, 2018, coming on as a substitute in the 83rd minute of León's 2–1 victory over Club Puebla. He scored his first goal for the club on March 24, 2018, in a friendly against his former team, the San Jose Earthquakes. On June 17, 2018, Club León announced they had decided to terminate Donovan's contract early.

=== San Diego Sockers ===
On January 24, 2019, Donovan signed with the San Diego Sockers in the Major Arena Soccer League. He provided an assist in a 6–4 win over the Tacoma Stars during his MASL debut on February 15 in front of a record crowd in Pechanga Arena San Diego. He scored his first two goals for the Sockers in the next game for a 13–2 win over Turlock Express, opening the scoring after just 12 seconds. Donovan was named to MASL's Week 14 Team of the Week and also named him as a 2018–19 All-MASL Top Newcomer.

== International career ==
Donovan was a member of the inaugural class at U.S. Soccer's full-time residency program for the under-17 national team at the IMG Academy in Bradenton, Florida. In his two years playing for the U-17 team, he scored 35 goals in 41 games and won the Golden Ball at the 1999 FIFA U-17 World Championship as the tournament's best player. He also represented the United States at the 1999 Pan American Games. In 2000, he moved up to both the United States U-23 men's national soccer team as well as the senior team. Despite this he played for the United States U-20 men's national soccer team in 2001. On March 20, 2001, he was involved in a collision with Marvin Lee, the captain of Trinidad and Tobago U-20 team during the 2001 CONCACAF U-20 Tournament in Trinidad. Lee collided head to side with Donovan which resulted in Lee being paralyzed after sustaining neck and spine injuries, while Donovan had fractured ribs. Lee died in 2003 from complications caused by his condition, the stadium now carries his name.

Donovan made his World Cup finals debut in the 2002 World Cup starting in the shock upset of pre-tournament favorites Portugal, a match the Americans won 3–2. Donovan's cross in the 29th minute deflected in off Jorge Costa, giving the U.S. a 2–0 lead. Later, Donovan would tally his first World Cup finals goal in the 83rd minute of a 3–1 loss to Poland in the third match of the group stage. He then scored his second goal of the tournament on a header which clinched a 2–0 round of 16 victory for the Americans over arch-rival Mexico. Though the U.S. would go on to lose 1–0 to Germany in the quarter-finals, Donovan would later be named Best Young Player of the tournament.

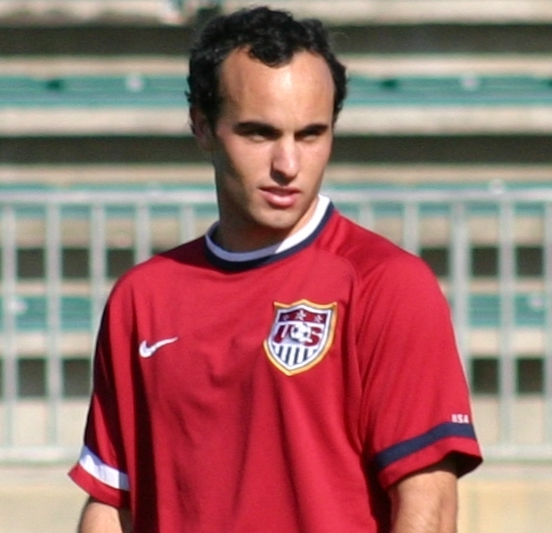
Donovan during practice in 2006

Donovan was a member of the U.S. squad at the 2006 World Cup, in which the Americans were eliminated in the group stage. Failing to provide any goals or assists throughout the three matches, he was widely criticized by American viewers for his performance. The following year, he led the U.S. to the 2007 Gold Cup title with four goals, including a crucial penalty in the 2–1 victory over Mexico in the final. On January 19, 2008, Donovan scored his 35th international goal, a penalty against Sweden, and passed Eric Wynalda as the United States' all-time leading goal scorer. Donovan reached 100 caps at age 26 on June 8, 2008, in a friendly against Argentina that ended in a 0–0 draw, becoming the fourth-youngest person to do so. Donovan captained the U.S. in the group stage of the 2009 FIFA Confederations Cup due to Carlos Bocanegra's injury absence. Donovan scored on a penalty kick against Italy, shortly after his team had been reduced to ten men, and scored for the U.S. in a 3–2 defeat to Brazil in the final. On October 10, 2009, Donovan scored on a free-kick, giving the U.S. a 3–2 victory over Honduras in San Pedro Sula that clinched World Cup qualification.

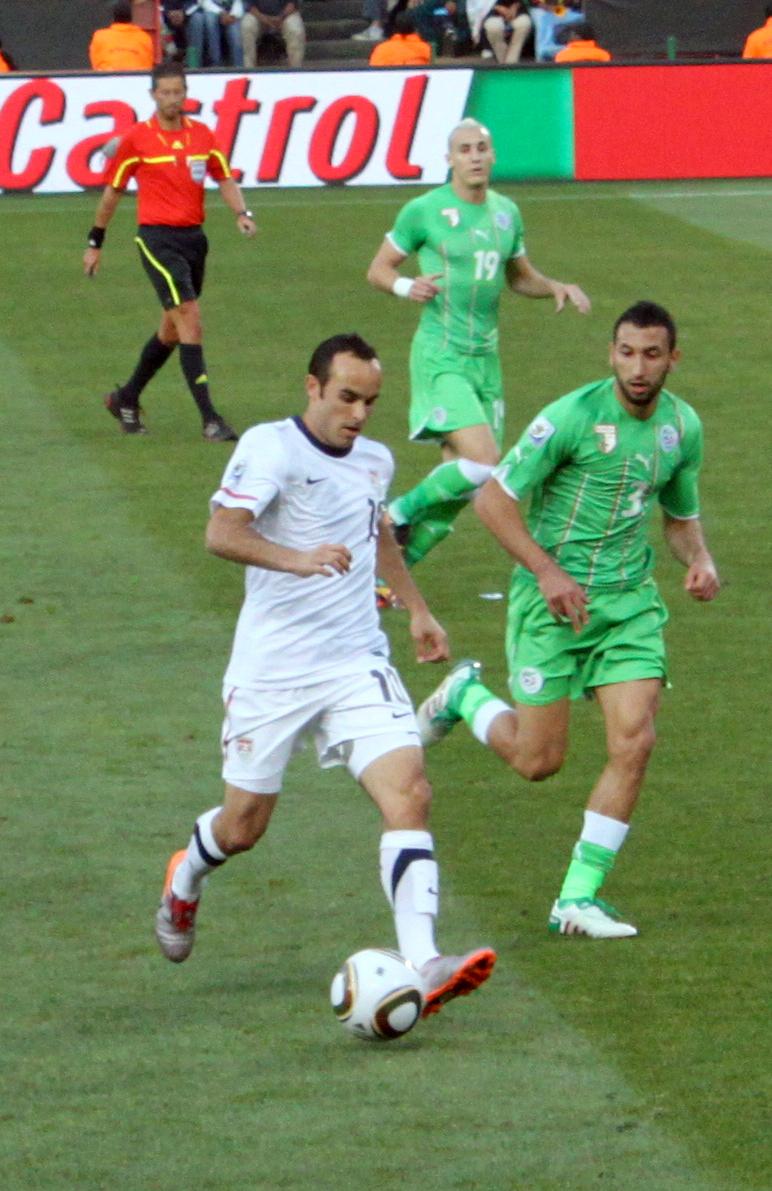
Donovan (left) playing against Algeria at the 2010 FIFA World Cup

Donovan played every minute of the U.S. campaign at the 2010 FIFA World Cup in South Africa. He scored against Slovenia with a powerful close-range finish to begin a U.S. comeback for a 2–2 draw, and the only goal in the dying seconds of a 1–0 defeat of Algeria with a finish off a rebounded Clint Dempsey attempt, leading the U.S. to first place in their World Cup group for the first time since 1930. Donovan scored a penalty in the round of 16 against Ghana as the U.S. lost 2–1 after extra time and were eliminated from the competition. His goals in South Africa made Donovan the highest scoring American male in World Cup history, and just the third American man to score in more than one World Cup, after Brian McBride and Clint Dempsey. His total of five World Cup goals is the most for any man representing a team from CONCACAF.

After missing the first two World Cup qualifiers of 2013 due to his extended off-season sabbatical, Donovan was left off of the squad by Jürgen Klinsmann for the June qualifying matches, despite having returned to playing full-time in March. However, Donovan was re-called to the national team for the 2013 CONCACAF Gold Cup to be played in July. On July 5, 2013, he became the first U.S. player to reach the 50 international goal mark and the fourth man in CONCACAF to score 50 international goals after a brace against Guatemala in a warmup friendly before the Gold Cup. Four days later, Donovan became the first player to reach 50 goals and 50 assists for the United States during a 6–1 group stage victory in their 2013 Gold Cup opener against Belize in which he had one goal and two assists. After the U.S. won the Gold Cup title with a 1–0 victory over Panama, Donovan was awarded the tournament's Best Player trophy after tying for the tournament lead with five goals scored. He started every match of the tournament for the United States. Donovan was recalled to the full national squad for the first time in over a year for the U.S.'s September World Cup qualifying matches against Costa Rica and Mexico. Donovan started and played 90 minutes in both games. With the U.S. needing a win over Mexico to clinch qualification, Donovan's corner kick assisted Eddie Johnson's go-ahead goal in the 57th minute. Then, in the 78th minute, Donovan scored off a low cross from Mix Diskerud to make the score 2–0, and effectively seal the win, and the World Cup berth.

In May 2014, Donovan was named in the preliminary squad for the 2014 World Cup and joined the team in training camp. However, on May 22, 2014, he was controversially omitted from the final U.S. squad by manager Jürgen Klinsmann. Donovan's absence from the team even became the comedic subject of a PlayStation Commercial where Donovan makes light of his newly found free time. Klinsmann later called his decision "one of the toughest decisions in [his] coaching career", but said, "I just think the other guys right now are a little bit ahead of him." Klinsmann's decision, which was described by media staff as abruptly timed after Klinsmann had previously promised to wait until after the team's friendly matches to announce cuts, saw additional controversy when Klinsmann's son Jonathan published and later deleted a post on Twitter that appeared to ridicule Donovan following the announcement.

On October 10, 2014, Donovan played his 157th and final match for the United States in a friendly against Ecuador in East Hartford, Connecticut. The match was arranged by United States Soccer Federation president Sunil Gulati to give Donovan a proper farewell, despite the disagreement between Donovan and Klinsmann. Following his retirement, he was named by The Guardian as the U.S. team's greatest ever player.

After playing in the Major Arena Soccer League during the 2018–19 season, Donovan was named to the United States national arena soccer team ahead of a friendly against Mexico.

== Style of play ==
Donovan was a versatile attacker known for his pace and stamina as well as intelligence and technical skill, allowing him to play at various forward and midfield positions at different points of his career. His longtime international and club manager Bruce Arena was once quoted as saying, "the problem with Landon is that he's your best player at so many positions that you never know where to put him."

Particularly in the early parts of his career, Donovan played as a withdrawn striker and was most noted for his quickness and goalscoring ability. As his professional career progressed, Donovan was increasingly utilized by managers as a wide attacking midfielder, where he could additionally benefit the team with his playmaking abilities, passing vision, and defensive work rate. Donovan also provided capable delivery on set pieces (as well as occasionally scoring from direct kicks) and served as first-choice penalty taker for club and country for much of his career.

== Coaching career ==
=== MLS Homegrown Game ===
In July 2015, it was announced Donovan had been appointed as head coach for a team consisting of young MLS players for the 2015 MLS Homegrown Game. The game took place on July 28, 2015, at Dick's Sporting Goods Park in Commerce City, Colorado. Donovan led a team of MLS academy graduates, assembled just one day prior, to a 1–1 regulation tie, followed by a 4–5 shootout loss, as reported online. Donovan selected and coached the team a second time in the 2016 edition of the event.

=== San Diego Loyal ===
On November 14, 2019, Landon Donovan was named the inaugural manager of the San Diego Loyal, a team that he helped co-found and was the vice president of soccer operations. Noting that his hiring was a risk for the club because he had never coached before, Donovan surrounded himself with an experienced backroom staff. He brought on former coach Paul Buckle and former United States women's national soccer team player Shannon MacMillan as senior advisors to his staff. While also bringing in experienced coaches in Carrie Taylor, Nate Miller and Matt Hall to his staff. Donovan noted that he wanted a staff with experienced coaches because they could aid him with the day-to-day responsibilities with a coaching role that he was unfamiliar with.

During his first season in charge, Donovan lead San Diego to 6-5-5 record. Donovan and the Loyal garnered international headlines when they forfeited the last two matches of the season after having alleged instances of racial and homophobic abuse directed at their players by the Los Angeles Galaxy II and Phoenix Rising respectively went unpunished. After the second instance, where Phoenix Rising player Junior Flemmings allegedly directed a homophobic slur against openly gay San Diego player Collin Martin, Donovan stated: "We went through a really hard incident in the LA match and we made a vow to ourselves, our community, our players, the club and the USL that we would not stand for bigotry, homophobic slurs and things that don't belong in our game. Our players in the heart and passion of the moment still wanted to play, but if we wanted to be true to who we are as a club, we have to speak and we have to act. After half-time we all decided if the player who used the homophobic slur was not removed from the game – either by the officials or by his coach – we would not play. If they are not willing to act, we have to act."

On December 2, 2022, Donovan was elevated to full-time Executive Vice President of Soccer Operations for Loyal. Associate head coach Nate Miller was promoted to head coach.

On October 23, 2023, The San Diego Loyal dissolved as a result of the inability to find a stadium and the MLS expanding to San Diego.

=== San Diego Wave ===
On August 16, 2024, Donovan was announced as the interim head coach of National Women's Soccer League (NWSL) club San Diego Wave FC, replacing interim coach Paul Buckle. Donovan's tenure as interim head coach ended on November 18, 2024.

== Off-field career ==
=== Broadcasting career ===
After being left off the 2014 World Cup roster for the United States, Donovan joined the ESPN/ABC broadcast team for the World Cup as a studio analyst. After his retirement, Donovan became a color commentator for FOX Sports, participating in the network's coverage of the United States–Ecuador quarter-final of the Copa América Centenario. He also called the USMNT games on Fox with John Strong and Stuart Holden and then teamed up with ESPN/ABC's lead play-by-play announcer Ian Darke for the 2022 World Cup and Euro 2024.

=== San Diego Loyal (ownership and leadership) ===
Donovan, along with Warren Smith, a co-founder of Sacramento Republic, founded a USL Championship expansion team in June 2019. The team debuted in the USL Championship in 2020. Warren Smith will be the president, while Donovan will be the executive vice president of soccer operations and head coach of the new club. Provisionally named USL San Diego, the team's name and crest would be developed through fan engagement and reflect the interests of the city. On November 2, 2019, the team announced their branding and naming themselves San Diego Loyal.

=== Lincoln City ===
On 17 June 2021, it was announced that Donovan would be joining Lincoln City as a Strategic Advisor, working with the Board, Chief Executive Liam Scully and Director of Football Jez George to enhance the club's network and relationships, particularly within North America.

=== Author ===
In March 2026, Donovan released his memoir Landon: A Memoir.

== Personal life ==
Donovan married actress Bianca Kajlich on December 31, 2006; the couple separated in July 2009, and Donovan filed for divorce in December 2010. In May 2015, he married Hannah Bartell. They welcomed their first child, son Talon, in January 2016. Donovan has spoken publicly about dealing with depression throughout his life and career, and has criticized the professional sports world for its approach to mental health issues.

Donovan has dealt with hair loss since he was a teenager and has been outspoken on the subject. He underwent two hair transplants in the early 2020s, though the results failed. In 2025 he started using a hairpiece.

Since joining the Galaxy, Donovan has resided in Manhattan Beach, California. He speaks fluent Spanish, which he learned both in school and through playing in Latino clubs and leagues while growing up in California. He also speaks German as a result of his time spent in Germany. After his two brief stints playing for Everton in which he became a fan favorite, Donovan declared himself an "Evertonian for life".

He was featured on the American cover of FIFA Football 2003, the North American covers of FIFA 07, FIFA 11 and FIFA 12 video games.

In 2016, Donovan became a part owner of Welsh football club Swansea City, joining several other Americans in an investment group that has a majority stake in the club.

== Career statistics ==
=== Club ===
Appearances and goals by club, season and competition
Club	Season	League			National cup (Note: Includes DFB-Pokal, U.S. Open Cup, FA Cup, Copa MX)		Continental		Other		Total	
Club	Season	Division	Apps	Goals	Apps	Goals	Apps	Goals	Apps	Goals	Apps	Goals
Bayer Leverkusen	1999–2000	Bundesliga	0	0	0	0	0	0	—		0	0
Bayer Leverkusen	2000–01	Bundesliga	0	0	0	0	0	0	—		0	0
Bayer Leverkusen	2004–05	Bundesliga	7	0	0	0	2 (Note: Appearances in UEFA Champions League)	0	—		9	0
Bayer Leverkusen	Total		7	0	0	0	2	0	—		9	0
Bayer Leverkusen II	1999–2000	Regionalliga Nord	20	6	—		—		—		20	6
Bayer Leverkusen II	2000–01	Oberliga	8	3	1	0	—		—		9	3
Bayer Leverkusen II	Total		28	9	1	0	—		—		29	9
San Jose Earthquakes (loan)	2001	MLS	22	7	2	0	—		6 (Note: Appearances in MLS Cup playoffs)	5	30	12
San Jose Earthquakes (loan)	2002	MLS	20	7	2	0	2 (Note: Appearances in CONCACAF Champions Cup)	1	2	1	24	8
San Jose Earthquakes (loan)	2003	MLS	22	12	1	0	2	1	4	4	27	16
San Jose Earthquakes (loan)	2004	MLS	23	6	3	1	1	0	2	0	28	7
San Jose Earthquakes (loan)	Total		87	32	8	1	5	2	14	10	114	45
LA Galaxy	2005	MLS	22	12	3	2	—		4	4	29	18
LA Galaxy	2006	MLS	24	12	3	3	2	1	—		29	16
LA Galaxy	2007	MLS	25	8	3	1	—		5 (Note: Appearances in North American SuperLiga)	4	33	13
LA Galaxy	2008	MLS	25	20	0	0	—		—		25	20
LA Galaxy	2009	MLS	25	12	0	0	—		4	3	29	15
LA Galaxy	2010	MLS	24	7	0	0	2 (Note: Appearances in CONCACAF Champions League)	0	3	0	29	7
LA Galaxy	2011	MLS	23	12	1	0	8	2	4	3	36	17
LA Galaxy	2012	MLS	26	9	0	0	3	0	5	2	34	11
LA Galaxy	2013	MLS	22	10	0	0	3	0	2	0	27	10
LA Galaxy	2014	MLS	31	10	1	0	—		5	3	37	13
LA Galaxy	2016 (Note: This was Donovan's second spell with the LA Galaxy; he returned to the club after initially retiring.)	MLS	6	1	0	0	—		3	0	9	1
LA Galaxy	Total		253	113	11	6	18	3	35	19	317	141
Bayern Munich (loan)	2008–09	Bundesliga	6	0	1	0	0	0	—		7	0
Everton (loan) (Note: Donovan had two different loan spells with Everton.)	2009–10	Premier League	10	2	1	0	2 (Note: Appearances in UEFA Europa League)	0	—		13	2
Everton (loan)	2011–12	Premier League	7	0	2	0	—		—		9	0
León	2017–18	Liga MX	6	0	2	0	—		—		8	0
San Diego Sockers (indoor)	2018–19	MASL	8	5	—		—		2 (Note: Appearances in Ron Newman Cup playoffs)	0	10	5
Career total			412	161	26	7	27	5	51	29	511	200

=== International ===
Appearances and goals by national team and year
National team	Year	Apps	Goals
United States	2000	1	1
United States	2001	8	0
United States	2002	20	6
United States	2003	15	7
United States	2004	14	5
United States	2005	15	6
United States	2006	11	0
United States	2007	12	9
United States	2008	9	3
United States	2009	15	5
United States	2010	8	3
United States	2011	10	1
United States	2012	6	3
United States	2013	10	8
United States	2014	3	0
Total		157	57

== Coaching statistics ==
As of match played October 24, 2022

Coaching record by team and tenure
Team	From	To	Record							
Team	From	To	G	W	D	L	GF	GA	GD	Win %
San Diego Loyal	March 7, 2020	December 2, 2022	85	39	17	29	138	120	+18	45.88
San Diego Wave (interim)	August 16, 2024	November 18, 2024	10	3	1	6	12	18	−6	30.00

== Honors ==
San Jose Earthquakes

- MLS Cup: 2001, 2003
  - Western Conference Regular Season: 2003
  - Western Conference Playoffs: 2003

LA Galaxy

- Supporters' Shield: 2010, 2011
- U.S. Open Cup: 2005
- MLS Cup: 2005, 2011, 2012, 2014
  - Western Conference Regular Season: 2009, 2010, 2011
  - Western Conference Playoffs: 2005, 2009, 2011, 2012, 2014

San Diego Sockers

- Pacific Division Regular Season: 2018–19
  - Pacific Division Playoffs: 2018–19

United States

- FIFA Confederations Cup runner-up: 2009
- CONCACAF Gold Cup: 2002, 2005, 2007, 2013

Individual

- U.S. Soccer Young Athlete of the Year: 2000
- U.S. Soccer Athlete of the Year: 2003, 2004, 2009, 2010
- Best Male Soccer Player ESPY Award: 2002
- Best MLS Player ESPY Award: 2006, 2007, 2009, 2010, 2011
- Honda Player of the Year: 2002, 2003, 2004, 2007, 2008, 2009, 2010
- FIFA U-17 World Cup Golden Ball: 1999
- FIFA World Cup Best Young Player Award: 2002
- FIFA World Cup All-Star Team: 2002 (Reserve)
- CONCACAF Gold Cup Best XI: 2002, 2003, 2005, 2013; honorable mention: 2007
- CONCACAF Gold Cup Golden Ball: 2013
- CONCACAF Gold Cup top scorer: 2003, 2005, 2013
- CONCACAF Gold Cup Best Goal: 2011 (second place)
- CONCACAF Men's Olympic Qualifying Championship Best XI: 2004
- LA Galaxy Player of the Year: 2006, 2008, 2009, 2011
- LA Galaxy Golden Boot: 2005, 2006, 2007, 2008, 2009, 2011
- LA Galaxy Humanitarian of the Year: 2007, 2008
- Everton Player of the Month: January 2010, January 2012
- MLS All-Time Best XI: Midfielder
- Major League Soccer MVP: 2009
- MLS Player of the Month: September 2003, April 2003, April 2008, July 2009, May 2011, August 2014
- MLS Best XI: 2003, 2008, 2009, 2010, 2011, 2012, 2014
- MLS Cup MVP: 2003, 2011
- MLS All-Star: 2001, 2002, 2003, 2004, 2005, 2007, 2008, 2009, 2010, 2011, 2012, 2013, 2014
- MLS All-Star Game MVP: 2001, 2014
- MLS top assist provider: 2007, 2010, 2014
- MLS 100 goals club
- MLS 50/50 club
- MLS Golden Boot: 2008
- MLS Goal of the Year: 2009
- North American SuperLiga top scorer: 2007
- Premios Univision Deportes Lifetime Achievement Award: 2014
- Walt Chyzowych Fund Distinguished Playing Career Award: 2017
- IFFHS Legends
- The Guardian MLS Greatest Player of All Time
- National Soccer Hall of Fame: 2023

== See also ==
- List of men's footballers with 100 or more international caps
- List of men's footballers with 50 or more international goals
- List of FIFA World Cup top goalscorers
- List of athletes who came out of retirement
- Landon Donovan MVP Award

Sporting positions
Preceded by Cobi Jones	LA Galaxy captain 2007	Succeeded by David Beckham
Preceded by David Beckham	LA Galaxy captain 2009–2013	Succeeded by Robbie Keane
Preceded by Carlos Bocanegra	USA captain 2012–2014	Succeeded by Clint Dempsey
