= Michael Reschke =

German director of football (born 1957)

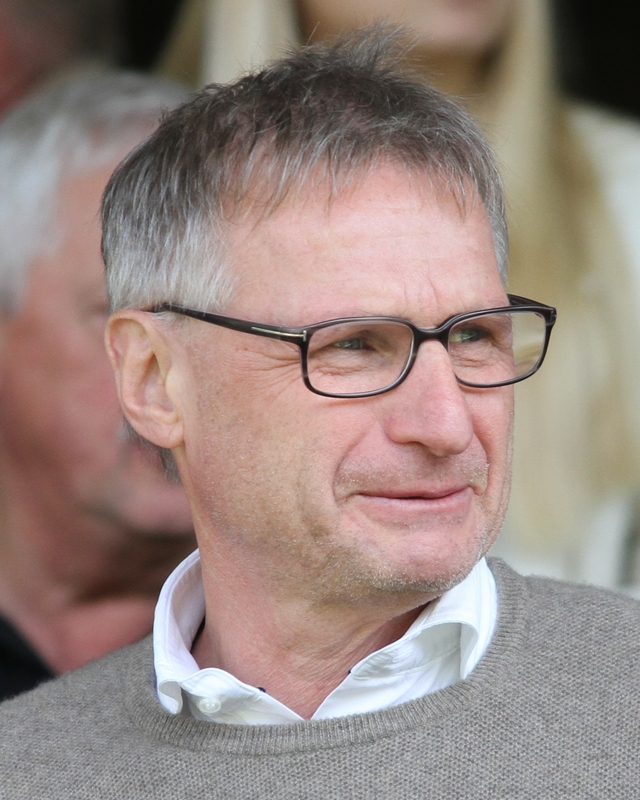
- Born: 29 September 1957 (age 68); Frechen, Germany
- Occupation: Director of football

Michael Reschke (born 29 September 1957) is a German director of football. He was head of sport of VfB Stuttgart from 2017 to 2019.

== Career ==
Reschke studied at the German Sport University Cologne. He started his career as youth coach of Viktoria Frechen and moved to Bayer 04 Leverkusen in 1979. In 1986 he coached the under-19 team of Leverkusen to win the German Championship. Reschke replaced Reiner Calmund as managing director of Bayer 04 Leverkusen in 2004. Reschke's successor as manager at Bayer 04 Leverkusen was Jonas Boldt, who had previously headed the club's scouting department.

In the summer of 2014 he became technical director of FC Bayern Munich.

Reschke moved to VfB Stuttgart in August 2017. He officially took over his new office as head of sport and sporting director in Stuttgart on 11 August 2017. On 12 February 2019, he was relieved of his duties. In the first season with Reschke as sports director, the re-promoted VfB managed to stay in the first division. After sporting failures in the 2018/19 Bundesliga season and Stuttgart slipping down to 16th place, Reschke was recalled in February 2019 and replaced by Thomas Hitzlsperger.

Reschke took over the newly created post of technical director at FC Schalke 04 for the 2019/20 Bundesliga season. He started the new job on 1 June 2019. As technical director, he was responsible for restructuring the scouting department and squad planning. At the end of November 2020, the club, which was in 18th place after more than 24 consecutive Bundesliga games without a win, parted ways with Reschke. The reason given was that he had negotiated with Hertha BSC about the sale of captain Omar Mascarell at the end of the transfer period without the knowledge of the club and player. He was also seen as partly responsible for the sporting misery of the club.

After leaving Schalke, he became director of the English consulting agency Stellar Football, which looks after Eduardo Camavinga, among others.

== Trivia ==
During the 2017/18 season in Stuttgart, Reschke used the ritual of giving up his seat in the stands in the 76th minute of the game and going to coach Tayfun Korkut on the substitutes' bench.

In September 2018, Reschke proposed the innovative idea of introducing playoffs for the Bundesliga on the television show Wontorra – der Fußball-Talk. For this he was criticized by his former President Uli Hoeneß during a memorable press conference in October 2018 and called "the clever Mr. Reschke". Reschke explained that he hadn't asked for anything, just suggested discussing an idea, adding that being smart was "not the worst thing".
