= Clint Dempsey =

American soccer player (born 1983)

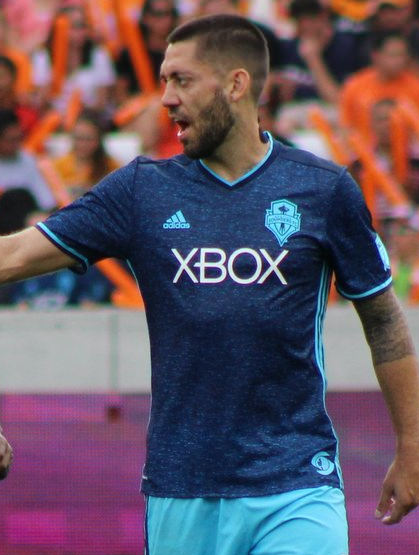
- Dempsey playing for Seattle Sounders FC in 2016

Personal information
- Full name: Clinton Drew Dempsey
- Date of birth: March 9, 1983 (age 43)
- Place of birth: Nacogdoches, Texas, U.S.
- Height: 6 ft 1 in (1.85 m)
- Positions: Forward; midfielder

Youth career
- 1998–2001: Dallas Texans SC

College career
Years	Team	Apps	(Gls)
2001–2003	Furman University	62	(17)

Senior career*
Years	Team	Apps	(Gls)
2004–2006	New England Revolution	71	(25)
2007–2012	Fulham	189	(50)
2012–2013	Tottenham Hotspur	29	(7)
2013–2018	Seattle Sounders FC	115	(47)
2014	→ Fulham (loan)	5	(0)
Total		409	(129)

International career
2002–2003	United States U20	13	(21)
2004–2017	United States	141	(57)
Medal record
Men's soccer
Representing United States
FIFA Confederations Cup
Runner-up	2009 South Africa
CONCACAF Gold Cup
Winner	2005 United States
Winner	2007 United States
Winner	2017 United States
Runner-up	2011 United States
CONCACAF Cup
Runner-up	2015 United States
- * Club domestic league appearances and goals

Clinton Drew Dempsey (/ˈdɛmpsi/; born March 9, 1983) is an American former professional soccer player who is a sports analyst on the television program Soccer on CBS Sports. He played as a forward and midfielder for Premier League clubs Fulham and Tottenham Hotspur and in Major League Soccer for clubs New England Revolution and Seattle Sounders FC. Widely considered as one of the greatest American players of all time, he was one of his country's most important trailblazers in Europe, and is tied with Landon Donovan for the record of most international goals scored by an American player (57).

A native of Nacogdoches, Texas, Dempsey spent his youth career with the Dallas Texans before joining Furman University's men's soccer team in 2001. In 2004, he was drafted by the New England Revolution, where he was named MLS Rookie of the Year in 2004 and named to the MLS Best XI in 2005 and 2006. In 2007, Dempsey signed for Premier League club Fulham for £2 million. With Fulham, he was an integral part of the team that were runners-up to Atlético Madrid for the 2009–10 UEFA Europa League. He was awarded Fulham Player of the Season for 2010–11 and 2011–12, where he was the club's top scorer for both. In 2012, Dempsey became the first American player to score a hat-trick in the Premier League. He is Fulham's all-time top Premier League goalscorer with 50 goals.

In 2012, Tottenham Hotspur signed Dempsey for a fee of $9.6 million, then a league record signing for an American. He scored 12 goals across all competitions in his one season with Tottenham including 7 league goals, which Dempsey holds the all-time American goalscoring record for a single top tier European league with 57. He was signed by the Seattle Sounders the following year, and played 115 matches for the club, scoring 47 goals, and leading the club to win the 2014 Supporters' Shield. During the 2016 season, Dempsey was diagnosed with an irregular heartbeat and missed the team's run to the MLS Cup. He returned the following season, winning the 2017 MLS Comeback Player of the Year Award before announcing his retirement from professional soccer in 2018.

Dempsey represented the United States at the 2003 FIFA World Youth Championship and made his first appearance with the senior team on November 17, 2004. He earned more than 140 caps and scored 57 international goals, making him the nation's fourth-most capped player and tying him with Landon Donovan as the top all-time scorer with 57 goals. Dempsey is the only American to have scored in three different FIFA World Cups; 2006, 2010, and 2014; with the latter edition he scored the 5th fastest goal in World Cup history. He was runner-up of the 2009 FIFA Confederations Cup, where he received the Bronze Ball. Dempsey won the CONCACAF Gold Cup in 2005, 2007, and 2017; also winning the Golden Boot of the 2015 edition. Individually, Dempsey won both the U.S. Soccer Player of the Year award three times, and the Fútbol de Primera Player of the Year three times. In 2022, he was inducted into the National Soccer Hall of Fame.

== Early life and career ==
Dempsey was born in Nacogdoches, Texas, and is of Irish ancestry on his father's side. For much of his childhood, Dempsey's family lived in a trailer park where he and his siblings grew up playing soccer with the complex's large population of Hispanic immigrants.

In his teens, Dempsey maintained these ties playing in a local Mexican-dominated adult league. His older brother, Ryan, was offered a tryout for the Dallas Texans, an elite youth soccer club, and brought Dempsey, who was noticed and recruited while passing time juggling a ball on the sidelines.

Dempsey became a standout on the team at an early age but had to quit due to financial constraints as his eldest sister Jennifer was becoming a ranked youth tennis player. Several parents of his teammates with the Texans offered to assist the Dempseys with expenses and travel, allowing him to rejoin the club.

On November 27, 1995, Dempsey's 16-year-old sister Jennifer died from a brain aneurysm. Dempsey was devastated with the family's loss and later explained that this event helped him develop a deeper motivation to pursue soccer in honor of his sister.

He went on to be the captain and high scorer of the Texans and was honored with the MVP of the Tampa Bay Sun Bowl tournament. Dempsey studied the play of Argentina's national team, especially Diego Maradona, and was heartbroken when the news came to Nacogdoches that Maradona would not be playing in the 1994 World Cup game played in the Cotton Bowl. He attended Furman University as a health and exercise science major and a key player for Paladins soccer. Dempsey was an "outstanding" midfielder while at Furman, named second team NSCAA All-American in 2002, and receiving All-Southern Conference first team honors in 2001 and 2002. He earned NSCAA All-South Region honors in 2002 and 2003 and was a member of the 2001 Soccer America and College Soccer News All-Freshman teams.

== Club career ==
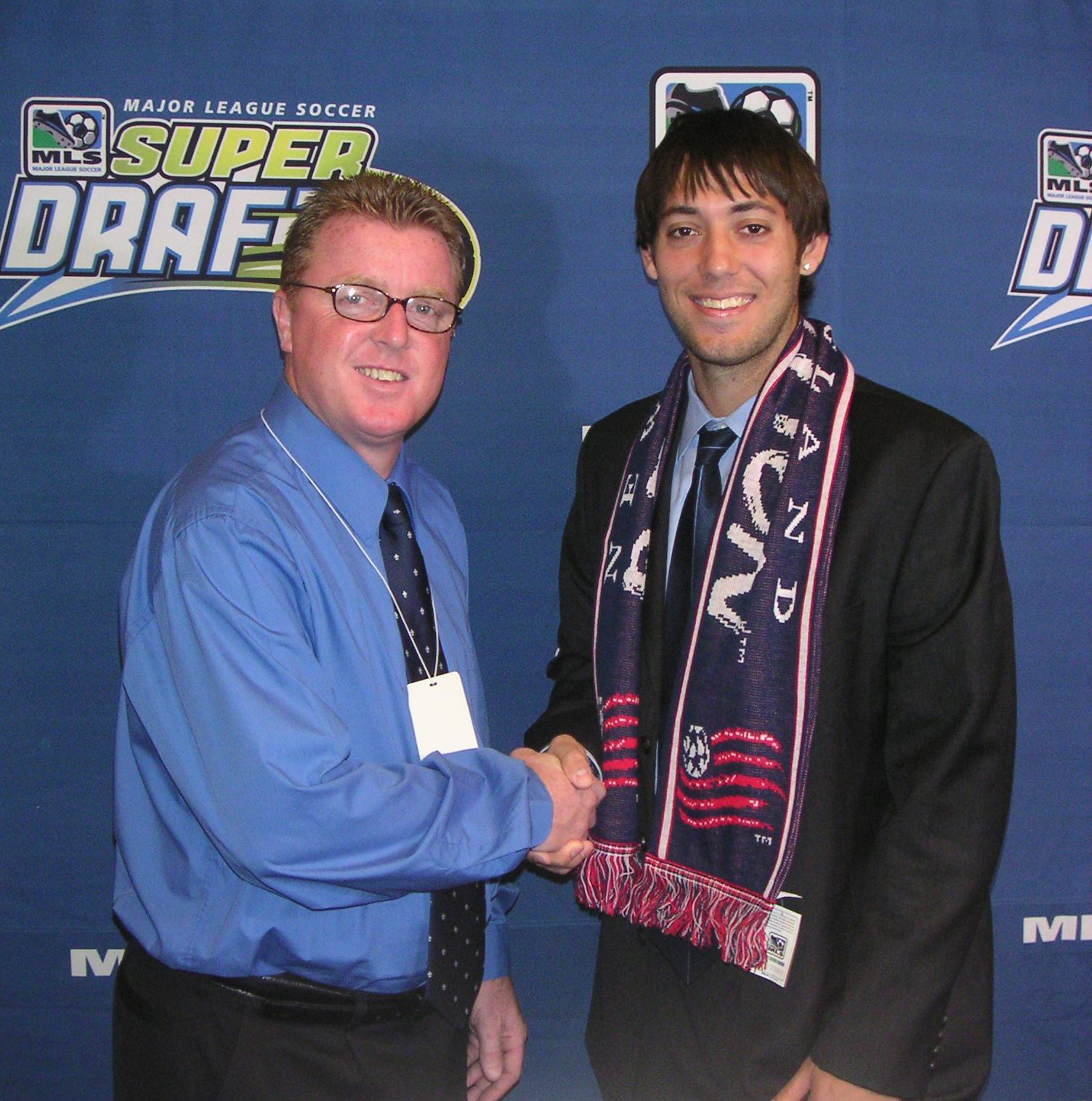
Dempsey at the 2004 MLS SuperDraft

=== New England Revolution ===
The New England Revolution selected Clint Dempsey with their first pick (eighth overall) in the 2004 MLS SuperDraft. He made his Revolution debut in the 2004 season home opener, a 3–1 loss against the San Jose Earthquakes on April 17, 2004. The match was notable as the final home appearance for Revolution striker Joe-Max Moore. Dempsey scored his first MLS goal the following week, giving the Revolution a 12th minute lead against the MetroStars on April 25.

In his rookie season, Dempsey started 23 of 24 matches, playing at least three with a broken jaw, and scoring seven goals, tied for third on the team with Steve Ralston. Dempsey helped the Revolution to the 2004 Eastern Conference Finals and earned 2004 MLS Rookie of the Year Honors, beating out finalists Freddy Adu and Chad Marshall. He was also named the 2004 Man of the Year by the Midnight Riders, and was named an MLS All-Star.

In 2005, Dempsey contributed ten goals and nine assists in 26 games, second in team scoring behind Taylor Twellman. He was named MLS Player of the Week for matchweek 4, and won MLS Goal of the Week in matchweek 5, a strike which was subsequently a finalist for 2005 MLS Goal of the Year. He scored the game-winning goal in the 4th minute of the Eastern Conference Final on his way to an appearance in the MLS Cup Final. He was again named an MLS All-Star, and also named a member of the MLS Best XI.

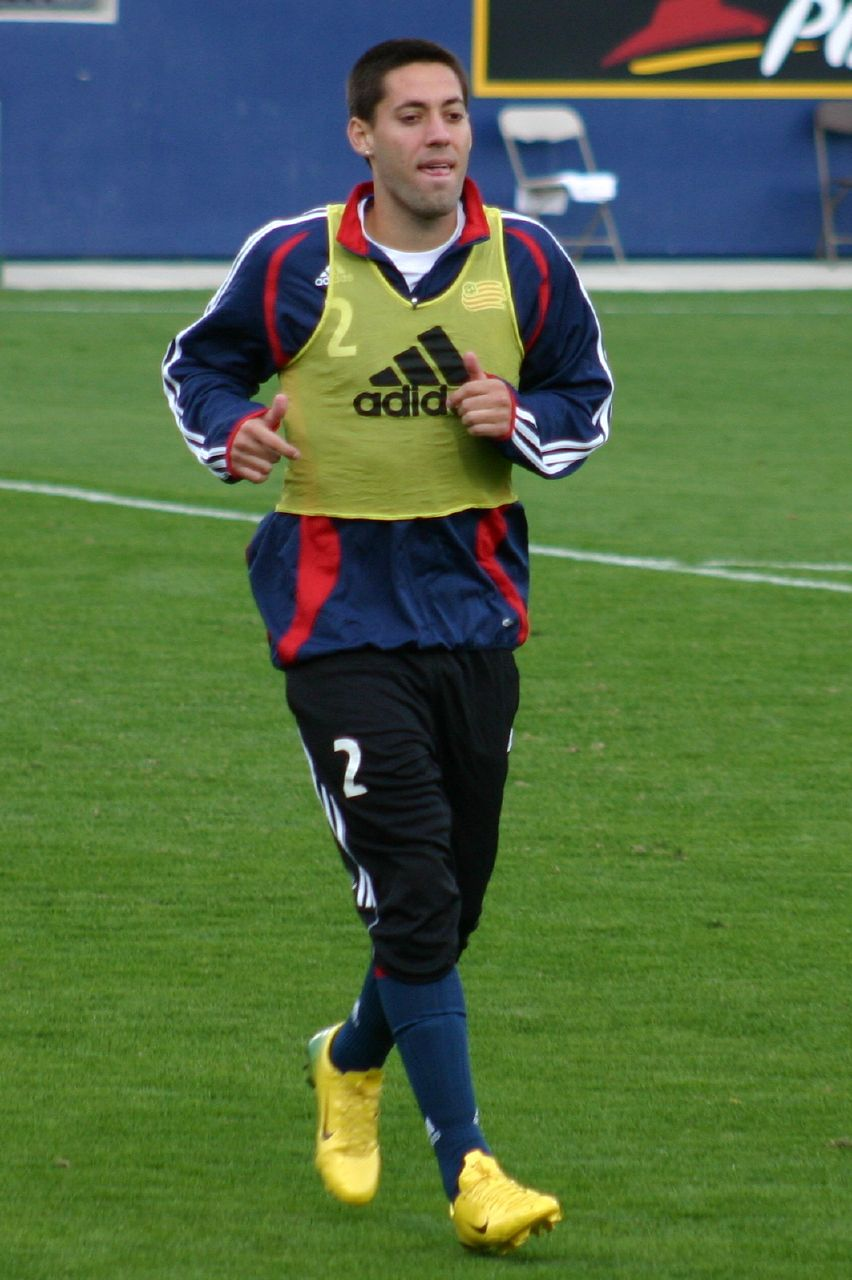
Dempsey with the New England Revolution in 2006

In March 2006, Dempsey received a two-week suspension for fighting with teammate Joe Franchino in practice. During the regular season, Dempsey added eight more goals, but missed significant time in the playoffs due to injury, and time during the regular season due to the World Cup. Dempsey won MLS Player of the Week honors for week 14, and MLS Goal of the Week in matchweek 28 for his strike against D.C. United. He came on as a substitute in the MLS Cup Final, but the Revolution lost their second straight final, this time in a penalty shoot-out. He was named an MLS All-Star for a third time, and to the MLS Best-XI for a second time.

=== Fulham ===
==== 2006–07 season ====
In December 2006, English club Fulham offered MLS $4 million for the transfer of Dempsey, then the largest amount ever offered for an MLS player, and he became another American addition to a Cottagers' squad which included U.S. internationals Brian McBride and Carlos Bocanegra.

On January 11, 2007, he was granted a work permit from the Home Office as Fulham announced his signing on a long-term deal. This made Dempsey the most expensive American export to the Premier League in a deal worth a reported £2 million. He made his Fulham debut in a 1–1 home draw against Tottenham Hotspur on January 20, 2007. His FA Cup debut followed seven days later in a 3–0 home win over Stoke City.

Dempsey scored his first goal for Fulham on May 5 when he struck the only goal of a 1–0 home win over Liverpool. This goal saved Fulham from relegation and effectively guaranteed their place in the top-flight for the following season.

==== 2007–08 season ====
Dempsey was not in the starting XI for the first three matches of the 2007–08 season, but after an injury to Brian McBride, he came into the side as a striker and scored in a 2–1 defeat against Aston Villa. He followed this up by scoring in Fulham's next fixture in a 3–3 home draw against Tottenham on September 1.

Two weeks later, he opened the scoring in Fulham's 1–1 away draw against Wigan Athletic.

These goals gave Dempsey three in as many games. On September 29, Dempsey was involved in an aerial collision with John Terry during a 0–0 draw at Stamford Bridge which resulted in Terry later being substituted. There was some suggestion that Dempsey used a deliberate elbow on Terry; however, referee Martin Atkinson did not report the incident to The Football Association.

On November 3, Dempsey scored during Fulham's 3–1 home win over Reading to secure just a second league win of the season.

He scored his last goals of the season in a 1–1 home draw with Wigan Athletic and a 5–1 away loss to Tottenham in December.

In May 2008, Fulham announced Dempsey had signed a contract extension which would keep him at the club until the summer of 2010. Fulham beat Portsmouth 1–0 on the final day of the season to secure Premier League status for another year. He ended the season as Fulham's top Premier League goalscorer with six goals.

==== 2008–09 season ====
Dempsey made the Fulham XI only once in the first eleven fixtures of the 2008–09 season but scored his first goal in a 1–1 away draw at Portsmouth on October 26 after coming on as a substitute. He replaced Zoltan Gera in the side and scored his first home goal of the season in a 3–0 win over Middlesbrough on December 20. Eight days later he scored twice in the West London derby against Chelsea which included a last-minute equalizer in a 2–2 home draw.

On February 24, 2009, Dempsey scored the first FA Cup goal of his career in a 2–1 home win over Swansea City in the fifth-round. His final home goal of the season came in a 2–1 defeat to Blackburn Rovers on March 11. Fulham came from a goal down to beat Manchester City 3–1 away from home as Dempsey scored two goals on April 12.

For the second successive season, Dempsey ended as Fulham's top Premier League goalscorer joint with Andrew Johnson with seven goals. These goals helped Fulham secure a seventh-place finish in the Premier League, the highest in the club's history, and confirmed their qualification for the newly formed UEFA Europa League for the following season.

==== 2009–10 season ====
On August 13, 2009, Dempsey signed a contract extension to remain with Fulham through 2013.

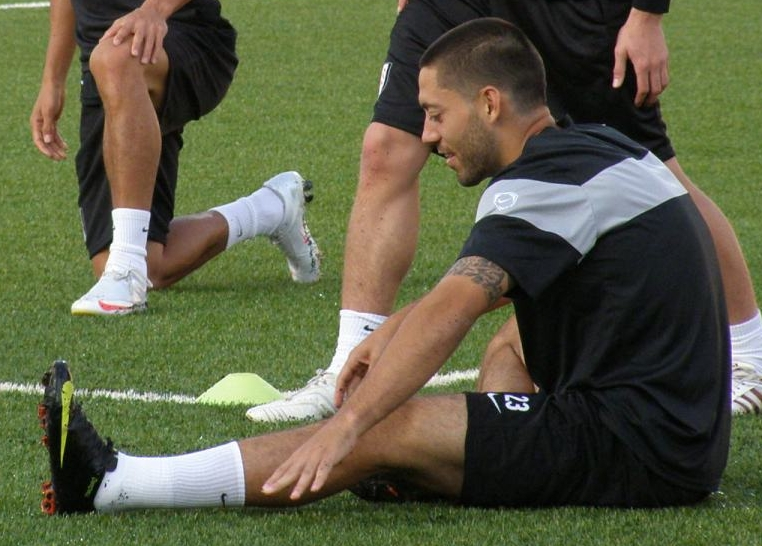
Dempsey training with Fulham in August 2009

On August 20, he scored his first goal in European competition, in the new Europa League, netting Fulham's second goal in a 3–1 win against Amkar Perm in the play-off round.

On December 30, La Gazzetta dello Sport named Dempsey as one of the top eleven Premier League players of the season.

On January 17, 2010, Dempsey suffered a suspected cruciate knee ligament injury in a 2–0 away defeat to Blackburn Rovers.

On March 11, Dempsey returned, coming on in the last minute of Fulham's loss away to Juventus, and then completed 72 minutes of Fulham's 3–0 away loss to Manchester United in the league.

On March 18, Dempsey came off the bench against Juventus in their second-leg, last-16 tie in the Europa League and scored the winner on a long chip shot. Fulham won the game 4–1, and this game resulted in the club winning an award, as well as Dempsey receiving an award for his goal.

The Guardian suggested that the goal "might become the most famous goal in Fulham's history".

On May 12, Dempsey replaced Bobby Zamora in the 55th minute of the 2010 UEFA Europa League Final, thus making history in becoming the first ever American to appear in a major European final. In the end, Fulham lost the match, as Atlético Madrid's Diego Forlán scored in the 116th minute of extra time, giving Atlético a 2–1 win.

His performances throughout 2009–10 earned him the designation of Most Valuable Player among Americans in Europe by SoccerOverThere.com, among other sources.

==== 2010–11 season ====
Dempsey was on the substitutes' bench for Fulham's first two away games of 2010–11, but became a regular starter, one of only five U.S. players in the Premier League to do so. On September 18, 2010, he scored an equalizing goal on 56 minutes with a header against Blackburn Rovers at Ewood Park in the 1–1 draw to continue Fulham's unbeaten record in the Premier League.

On October 2, he scored against West Ham United past Robert Green, the same keeper that he had scored against in the World Cup. He continued his form by scoring two goals against Wigan Athletic on October 30 as Fulham ran out 2–0 winners.

On January 22, 2011, Dempsey scored another double versus Stoke City, putting Fulham temporarily out of relegation contention.

On March 19, Dempsey became the first American player to score ten goals in a Premier League season, beating Brian McBride's previous record of nine, also set while at Fulham in the 2005–06 season and 2006–07 season.

Dempsey broke Fulham's Premier League goalscoring record by netting twice in a 3–0 victory over Bolton on April 27, 2011. He has scored a total of 33 goals for the team in the Premier League, topping both Brian McBride and Steed Malbranque, each with 32. With these goals, he scored 12 goals for Fulham in the 2010–11 season.

Dempsey was voted Fulham player of the season for 2010–11 by the Fulham fans, and his 12 Premier League strikes meant he was the club's leading goalscorer for the campaign.

==== 2011–12 season ====
Dempsey scored a brace in the first leg of Fulham's 2011–12 Europa League play-off clash against Dnipro Dnipropetrovsk at Craven Cottage. Dempsey ended with two goals as Fulham ran out 3–0 winners, setting up a comfortable second leg in Ukraine.

On December 5, 2011, Dempsey scored in the 85th minute to secure a 1–0 win against Liverpool at Craven Cottage. The goal propelled Dempsey to become the most prolific U.S. goalscorer in the Premier League, passing Fulham legend and fellow American Brian McBride. Dempsey scored his fifth Premier League goal of the campaign with a header in a 2–0 home win against Bolton on December 17, lifting his side six points clear of the drop zone.

In the club's West London derby against rivals Chelsea on Boxing Day, Dempsey scored the equalizing goal as the game ended in a 1–1 draw. Dempsey became only the second American to post a hat trick in the FA Cup behind Chris Cleary with the first hat-trick of his career on January 7 against Charlton Athletic in their FA Cup third round game that ended in a 4–0 victory. On January 21, 2012, Dempsey scored his first Premier League hat-trick against Newcastle while the game ended in a 5–2 win for Fulham and sent his goal tally in the Premier League to nine for the season.

With his hat-trick against Newcastle, he became the first ever U.S. player to score a hat-trick in the Premier League. Dempsey scored his 10th Premier League goal of the season, sixteenth in all competitions, in a 1–1 draw against former manager Roy Hodgson's West Brom on February 1, 2012.

Dempsey "assisted" another goal in a 2–1 win against Stoke City on February 11, 2012. His 28th-minute shot hit the crossbar and was deflected by Stoke goalkeeper Thomas Sørensen. It was therefore awarded as an own goal off the goalie. His form this season continued against Wolverhampton Wanderers where Dempsey scored twice in a 5–0 victory for Fulham.

On March 8, 2012, the day before Dempsey's 29th birthday, Fulham manager Martin Jol revealed that the club had opened talks with Dempsey over a new three-year contract.

Dempsey scored his fourteenth and fifteenth Premier League goals of the campaign, bringing his tally to twenty-one in all competitions, in a 3–0 away win over Bolton Wanderers on April 7, the first a free kick and the second a header. The strikes moved Dempsey past Louis Saha's record of thirteen Premier League goals for the club in a single season. Dempsey finished fourth on the FWA Footballer of the Year list behind the winner, Arsenal's Robin van Persie, and Manchester United pair Wayne Rooney and Paul Scholes, who came in second and third, respectively. Dempsey became the first American player to reach the milestone of fifty goals in the Premier League, with a free kick against Sunderland in the last home game of the season.

On August 31, 2012, Fulham confirmed Dempsey's transfer to Tottenham Hotspur.

=== Tottenham Hotspur ===
On August 31, 2012, Dempsey joined Tottenham Hotspur on a three-year contract for a fee believed to be in the region of $9 million.

The deal made Dempsey the highest salaried U.S. soccer player at the time. With the 23 shirt that he wore at Fulham and the number 8 that he usually wore on international duty unavailable, he opted for the number 2 jersey, more usually associated with the right-back, which he wore at Furman University. He scored his first and the eventual match-winning goal for Tottenham in a 3–2 win over Manchester United. It was the first time in 23 years that Tottenham had won at Old Trafford. He scored his second goal for Spurs in the 39th minute in an away game at Southampton in October. Dempsey's third and fourth goals were scored against Everton in an eventual 2–1 loss and a deflected effort against Reading on New Year's Day to help Spurs win 3–1. In the FA Cup 3rd round, he scored a double against Coventry City.

On January 20, 2013, in driving snow at White Hart Lane against league leaders Manchester United, Dempsey was able to salvage a dramatic 1–1 draw for Spurs by slotting home a pass from Aaron Lennon in the 93rd minute. The goal was his fourth in four appearances in 2013. On January 27, 2013, Dempsey scored a looping header against Leeds United at Elland Road, in the FA Cup to bring the score to 2–1, however Tottenham couldn't draw level throughout the rest of the game, leaving the result at 2–1 to Leeds at the whistle.

Dempsey was unable to make an impression against his old club on March 17, when Fulham came away from White Hart Lane with a 1–0 victory. On April 21, he scored the first of three goals for Tottenham in a 3–1 win over Manchester City at White Hart Lane. On May 12, Dempsey scored a long range goal and added an assist while playing against Stoke City to help Spurs win 2–1, and keep them in contention for the fourth Champions League spot. On April 11, 2013, Dempsey scored two goals against Basel in the second leg of the Europa League quarter-finals to send the match into extra time. Tottenham eventually lost the match on penalties and thus were eliminated from the competition.

=== Seattle Sounders ===
On August 3, 2013, Dempsey signed with MLS club Seattle Sounders FC as a Designated Player on a four-year contract, for a transfer fee of $9 million. He again donned the number 2 shirt, forgoing the number 8 he usually wears for the United States and the number 23 he wore at Fulham. The previous user of the number 2 shirt, DeAndre Yedlin, moved to number 17. Dempsey made his league debut for Seattle on August 10, 2013, in a 2–1 victory over Toronto. Dempsey entered the match as a 34th-minute substitute, after Obafemi Martins came off with an ankle injury.

==== Loan to Fulham ====
On December 24, 2013, Dempsey re-signed with Fulham on a two-month loan. He made his return debut on January 4, 2014, in the Third Round of the FA Cup against Norwich City. Dempsey played the entire game which resulted in a 1–1 draw, and subsequently took part in the replay at Craven Cottage, a 3–0 victory for Fulham.

==== Return to Seattle ====
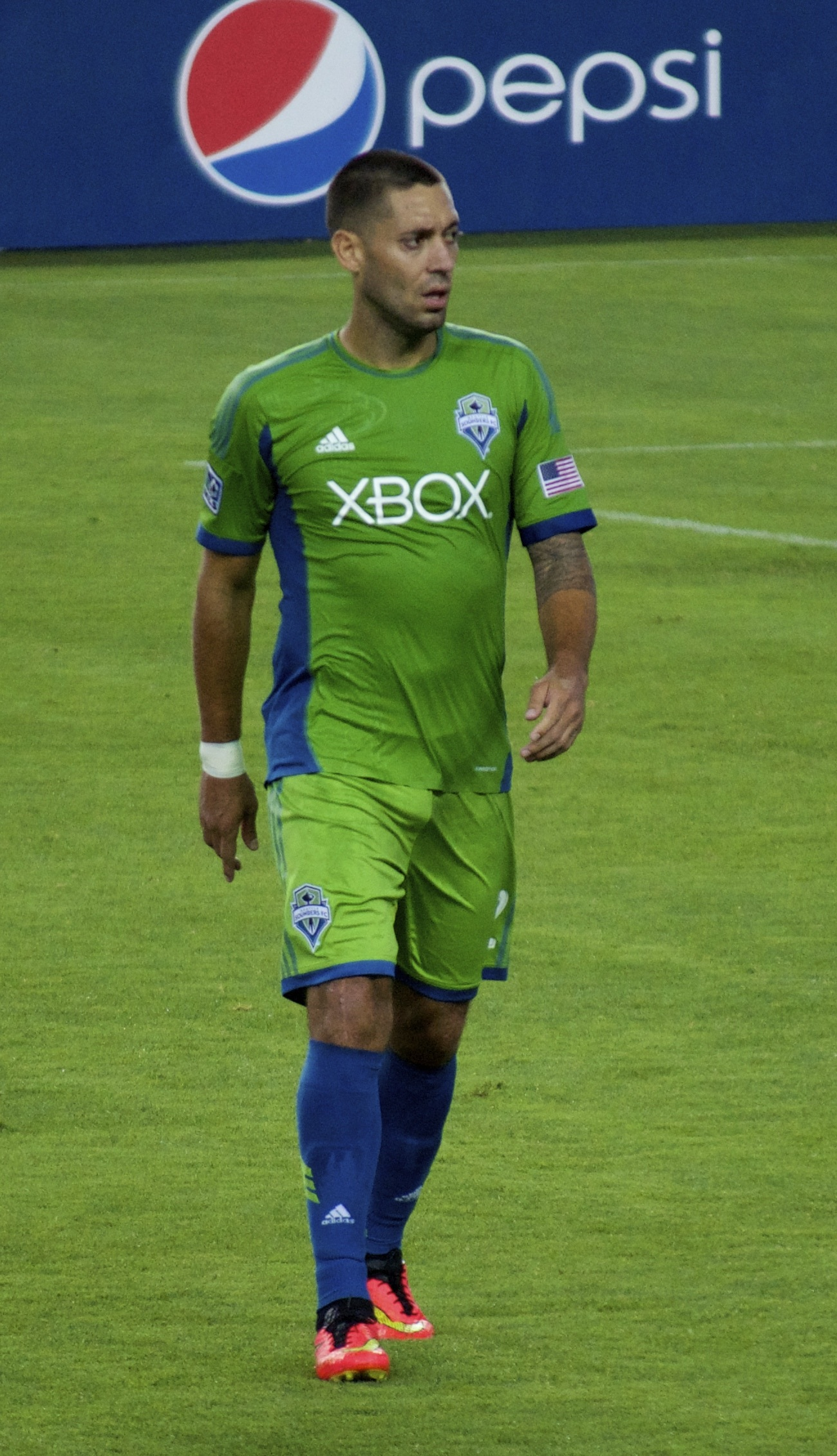
Dempsey playing for the Seattle Sounders in 2014

Although no announcement was made by Fulham, Dempsey appeared in the Seattle squad to face Sporting Kansas City in the season opener on March 10, 2014. Dempsey had made a return to form, scoring a hat-trick against Portland Timbers, and recording braces against FC Dallas and the Colorado Rapids, leaving his goal tally at 8 in 5 games for 2014. He earned the MLS's Player of the Month award for April. Both Dempsey's 15 goals and 10 assists were MLS career highs, as Seattle won the Supporters' Shield, but were eliminated in the conference finals of the MLS Cup by eventual champions LA Galaxy.

On June 16, 2015, in the fourth round of the Lamar Hunt U.S. Open Cup against rivals the Portland Timbers, Dempsey was sent off for ripping up referee Daniel Radford's notebook in protest at the dismissal of Michael Azira. The Sounders finished the match with seven men through three dismissals and an injury, and lost 1–3 at home. For the incident, he was given a three-match MLS suspension and a fine, and banned from the Open Cup for two years in addition to a second fine.

On July 13, 2016, Dempsey picked up his first MLS red card after putting his hands in the face of FC Dallas midfielder Juan Esteban Ortiz, who came in with a late challenge on Dempsey. Earlier in the game, Dempsey scored and provided an assist on Jordan Morris's goal. On August 7, he scored a hat-trick against Orlando City SC to capture their second road victory of the 2016 season. Dempsey played his last game of the season on August 21 against Portland, picking up a brace in the 3–1 win, while simultaneously setting a franchise record for the most goals by a player against one team in MLS play, with the goals being his seventh and eighth. While his absence in Seattle's next game at Houston was a scheduled rest, Dempsey was sidelined with an irregular heartbeat ahead of their Cascadia rivalry tie in Portland.

After returning to training in September, Dempsey was ruled out for the remainder of the season by general manager Garth Lagerwey on September 27.

Although there was speculation about the irregular heartbeat ending his career, Dempsey was eventually cleared to play in time for the 2017 MLS season. During the season Dempsey tallied 12 goals in 29 regular season appearances and was named MLS Comeback Player of the Year for 2017.

He announced his retirement from soccer on August 29, 2018.

== International career ==
For the national team, Dempsey has frequently lined up as a striker due to his scoring threat and aerial ability, but his preferred and more normal role is off the striker.

=== Early career: 2005 and 2007 Gold Cups and 2006 World Cup ===
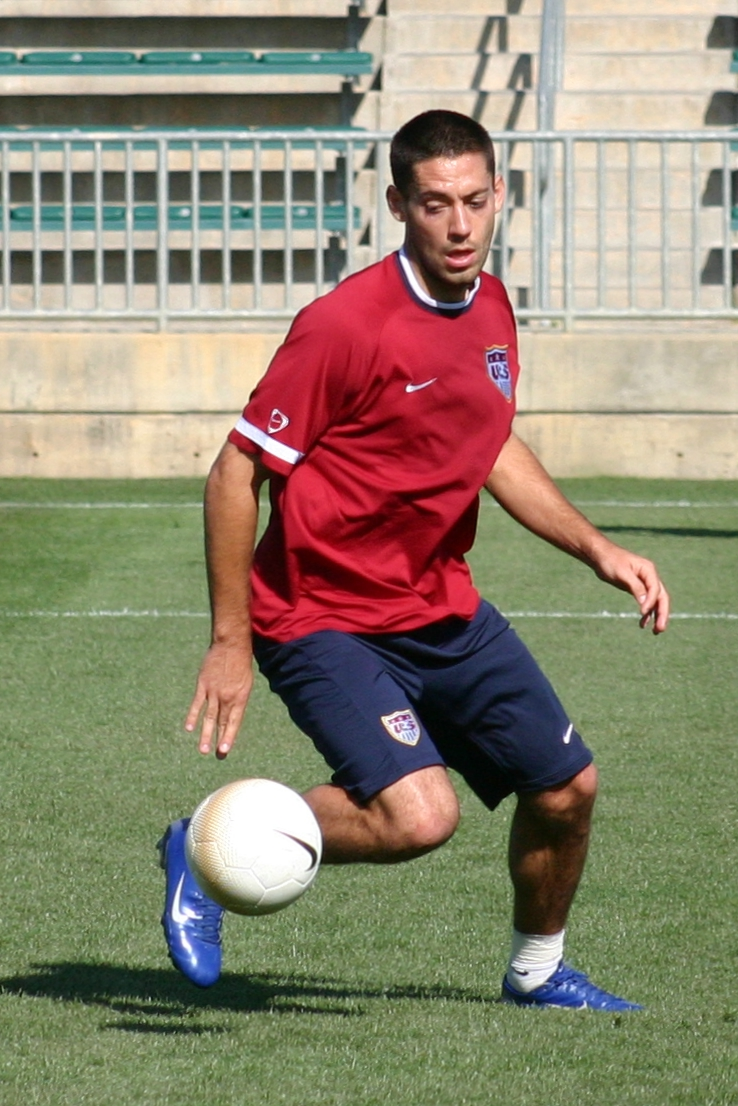
Dempsey training with the United States in April 2006

Dempsey first played for the United States national team at the 2003 FIFA World Youth Championship in the United Arab Emirates. He made his first appearance with the senior team on November 17, 2004, against Jamaica in qualification for the 2006 World Cup, replacing Ramiro Corrales for the final 23 minutes of a 1–1 draw at the Columbus Crew Stadium.

On May 28, 2005, he scored his first international goal on his sixth cap, a consolation in a 2–1 defeat to England at Soldier Field, Chicago, by heading in after a save by goalkeeper David James. Dempsey's first international tournament was the United States' victorious 2005 CONCACAF Gold Cup campaign; he netted their first goal, equalising as they came from behind to defeat Cuba 4–1 at Qwest Field in Seattle.

Dempsey was named to the US roster for the 2006 World Cup in Germany. He was the only American player to score a goal in the tournament, a group stage elimination, with his equalizing goal in the Americans' eventual 2–1 loss to Ghana. He won the highest individual honor in soccer in America when he was named Honda Player of the Year for 2006, beating Fulham teammates Kasey Keller and Brian McBride in a poll of sportswriters. Dempsey received 237 points in voting by 207 sports journalists to claim the award.

Dempsey was also present as the United States defended their title at the 2007 Gold Cup, again scoring their opening goal, the sole goal in a victory against Guatemala at The Home Depot Center; his side-footed shot from Taylor Twellman's assist gave the nation victory in Bob Bradley's first match as coach.

=== 2009 Confederations Cup and 2010 World Cup ===
In the United States' opening 2010 World Cup qualifier, Dempsey recorded the then fastest goal in U.S. qualifying history with a chest trap and sliding shot 53 seconds into an 8–0 defeat of Barbados. But thereafter, Dempsey experienced a dip in form leading some to doubt his first-choice status with the national team. However, Dempsey turned his fortunes around in the 2009 FIFA Confederations Cup. In the final group stage match against Egypt, Dempsey scored a trademark diving header off a Jonathan Spector cross, making the final result 3–0. This, combined with Brazil's 3–0 victory against Italy in the other group match that was being played simultaneously, put the United States through to the semi-finals. In the semi-final match against Spain, Dempsey scored to put the U.S. up 2–0 to send them to the finals. He was named the Man of the Match for his performance. Dempsey scored in his third straight game in the Confederations Cup Final against Brazil, redirecting a similar cross from Spector in the 10th minute to open the scoring.

Following the loss, he was awarded the Bronze Ball as the tournament's 3rd best performer. He ended the World Cup qualifying campaign tied with Landon Donovan as the team's second top scorer, behind Jozy Altidore, with five goals in thirteen matches.

On June 12, 2010, Dempsey became the second American (after Brian McBride) to score in more than one World Cup when he scored the equalizer goal against England in the Americans' first game of the 2010 World Cup after the England goalkeeper Robert Green made a major error. Dempsey's disallowed goal later in the tournament against Algeria in the group stage was very controversial. Dempsey was called offside, but the replay showed that he was most likely not offside. Despite this call, his teammate Landon Donovan scored a late stoppage time goal to win the game 1–0.

=== 2011 Gold Cup ===
During the 2011 Gold Cup, Dempsey played a key role in helping the United States advance to the final. In the group stages he recorded a goal in a 2–0 win over Canada, and in the quarter-finals, Dempsey also scored a goal in a 2–0 win over Jamaica. In the semi-finals against Panama, who had shockingly defeated the United States 1–2 in the group stage, Dempsey scored the only goal to advance the Americans to the final. With a sliding touch Dempsey redirected Landon Donovan's pass into the net.

On February 29, 2012, Dempsey scored the lone goal in an international friendly win against four-time World champion Italy. Jozy Altidore assisted on the goal, allowing the United States to win for the first time against Italy in eleven games played since 1934.

=== 2014 World Cup and 2015 Gold Cup ===
Dempsey broke his own fastest-goal record in World Cup qualifying on September 7, scoring just 39 seconds into a 2–1 defeat against Jamaica in Kingston. During a qualifying match against Guatemala on October 16, 2012, Dempsey scored his 29th and 30th international goal, tying him with Brian McBride for third most goals scored for the United States national team. The goals helped the United States advance into the final qualifying stage for the 2014 World Cup.

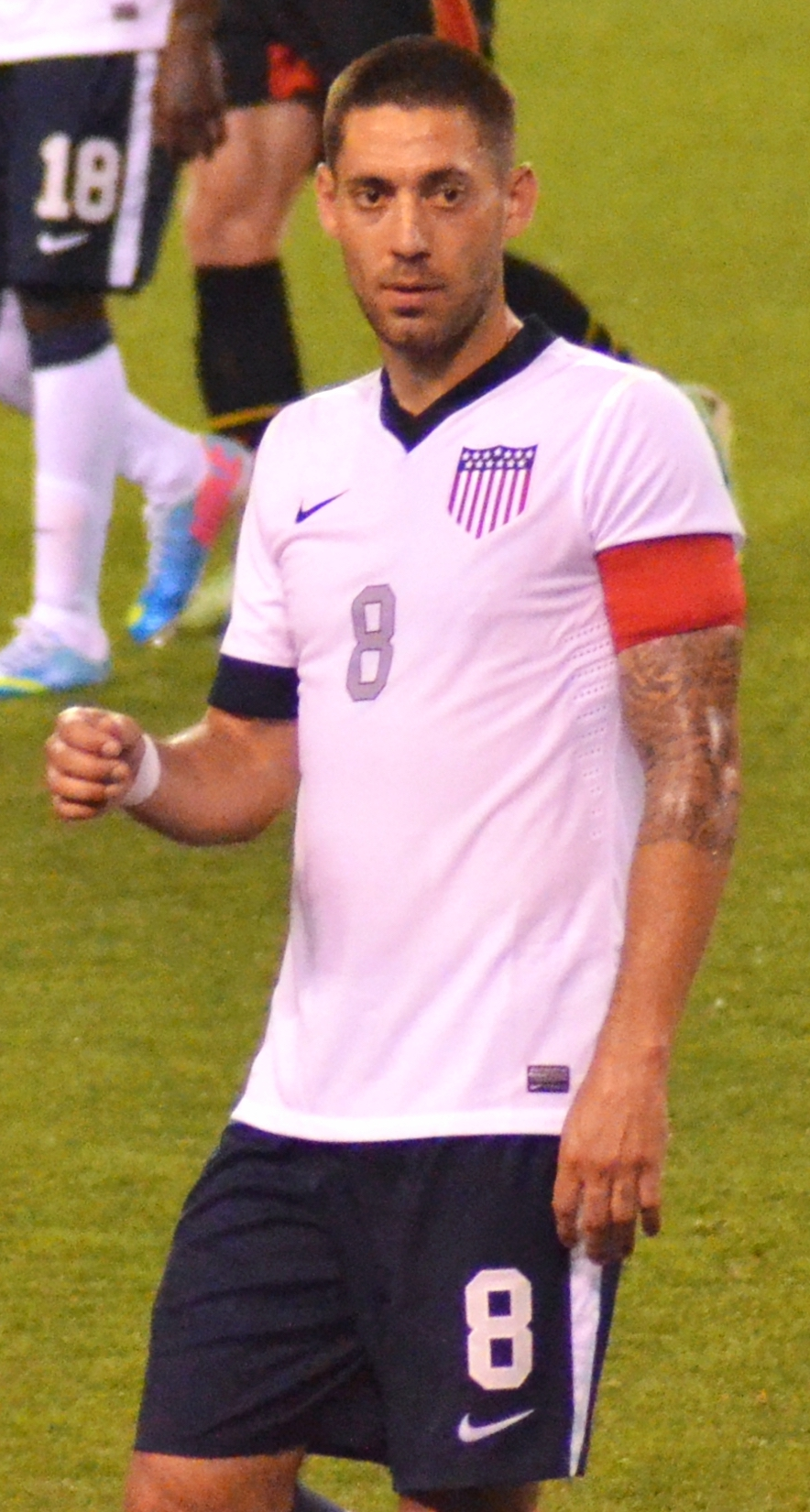
Dempsey playing for the United States in May 2013

In March 2013, Dempsey was given the captain's armband by Jürgen Klinsmann for the important World Cup qualifying matches versus Costa Rica and Mexico. On June 2, 2013, Dempsey scored two goals against Germany in a 4–3 win. The goals were his 34th and 35th overall for the national team, surpassing Eric Wynalda as second all-time top-goalscorer for the United States. Dempsey became the 14th American to reach 100 caps on September 6, 2013, netting a penalty in a 3–1 away defeat to Costa Rica in a qualifier.

In 2014, Dempsey was named as captain of the 23-man United States squad ahead of the FIFA World Cup. On June 16, he scored against Ghana 29 seconds into the group play match. It was the fastest goal in American World Cup history, and fifth fastest goal in all-time World Cup history. With this goal, Dempsey also became the first American player to score in three consecutive World Cups. Dempsey went on to suffer a broken nose midway through the first half as the United States defeated Ghana 2–1. In the following match against Portugal, Dempsey notched his fourth World Cup goal in a 2–2 draw. This goal drew Dempsey level with Bert Patenaude as the second-highest goalscoring American in the World Cup, one behind Landon Donovan.

Before the 2015 Gold Cup, Jurgen Klinsmann gave Michael Bradley the captain's armband, in wake of the U.S. Open Cup incident.

During the Gold Cup, Dempsey scored both U.S. goals in a 2–1 group stage win over Honduras at the Toyota Stadium in his native Texas. Three days later, at his former club ground in New England, he struck the only goal to defeat Haiti, sending his team into the quarter-finals, where he scored his first international hat-trick in a 6–0 victory against Cuba. In the third-place play-off, he scored his seventh goal of the tournament to equalize for a 1–1 draw against Panama, and also netted his attempt in the penalty shootout which his team eventually lost; he finished the tournament as its top scorer.

=== Copa América Centenario ===
In June 2016, Dempsey started all three group stage games of the Copa América Centenario. Against Costa Rica, he recorded his 50th international goal, and against Paraguay he recorded his 51st international goal to help the U.S. finish first in the group and advance to the quarter-finals. The U.S. were eliminated in the semi-finals by Argentina. In the quarter-final win over Ecuador, Dempsey scored the opening goal and assisted on the second goal, which was scored by Zardes.

=== 2018 World Cup Qualification ===
Dempsey's first goal during qualification for the 2018 FIFA World Cup was scored in the 4–0 victory by the U.S. over Guatemala on March 29, 2016, at the MAPFRE Stadium in Columbus, Ohio. He also earned an assist on the fourth goal of the evening, scored by Jozy Altidore.

On March 24, 2017, during the final round of qualification, Dempsey scored a hat trick in the 6–0 victory by the U.S. over Honduras, one goal from a free kick and the other two assisted by Christian Pulisic at the Avaya Stadium in San Jose. Four days after that, on March 28, he scored the U.S.'s lone goal, again assisted by Pulisic, in a 1–1 draw with Panama at the Estadio Rommel Fernández in Panama City.

=== 2017 Gold Cup ===
Dempsey was named to the 40-man preliminary roster for the 2017 CONCACAF Gold Cup by head coach Bruce Arena on June 3, 2017.

Dempsey was not named to the 23-man roster released on June 25, but was eligible to be called up as one of six roster replacements following the conclusion of the group stage. On July 16, Dempsey was called in to replace Dom Dwyer. He assisted Eric Lichaj's first international goal in the U.S.'s 2–0 victory over El Salvador in the quarter-finals on July 19, tying him with Claudio Reyna for fourth on the U.S. all-time assists list. On July 22, Dempsey assisted Altidore's goal and scored a free kick to defeat Costa Rica 0–2, sending the U.S. to the final, and seeing Dempsey overtake Reyna for fourth place in assists with 20 and tie Landon Donovan for most U.S. goals of all time at 57.

== Style of play ==
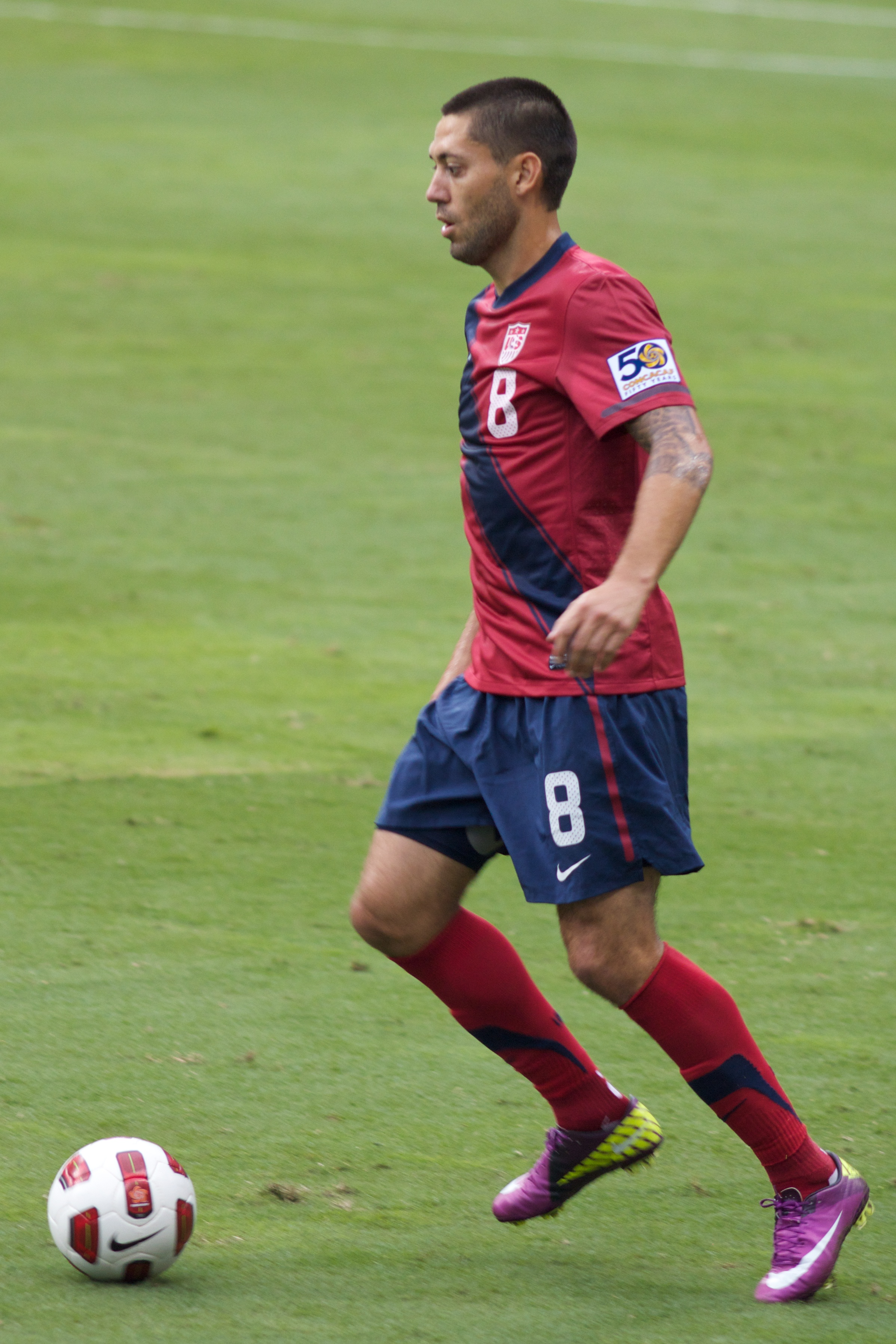
Dempsey playing for the United States in 2011.

Dempsey is known for his versatility and ability to play either as a forward, winger or attacking midfielder, depending on the formation. As a result, he has been categorized interchangeably as a forward or midfielder, as evidenced in the 2010 and 2014 FIFA World Cup squads where he was classified as a forward (FW) in the latter tournament and a midfielder (MF) in the former. During his time in Fulham, he established himself as goal-scorer who is able to score with both his head and feet, especially during important matches. Critics have described him as "audacious" due to his penchant for the odd "wonder goal" and reputation as "the guy who walked onto the field and started doing backheels", leading former national team coach Bruce Arena to say of him, "He tries shit."

His wonder goal for Fulham in the 2010 Europa League [round of 16] against Juventus, an audacious chip from the very edge of the penalty box, was a counterpoint to the narrative of American soccer players as brutish, hustling grunt workers. [H]is game was as creative, and as instinctual, as any American's of this or any other generation. Nobody was more likely to drop a back heel through traffic.

— Matt Pentz, The Guardian

Dempsey has occasionally been prone to aggressive play including physical altercations with opponents over the course of his career, which have sometimes resulted in suspensions.

== Personal life ==
Dempsey is married to Bethany Keegan Dempsey. They have six children and live in Pinehurst, North Carolina.

Dempsey is a practicing Catholic. He grew up in a Catholic family, going to church every Sunday with his grandmother. He has spoken about his faith, saying: "I play to the best of my abilities and am thankful for the many opportunities and amazing success God has given me. Through it all, I want to do right, not make mistakes, and live a life that is pleasing to Him."

Dempsey is a fan of the NFL's Houston Texans. Although not known for his fandom of hockey, he sounded the siren before the Carolina Hurricanes 2022 Stanley Cup Playoffs Round 2, Game 5 matchup against the New York Rangers in Raleigh, North Carolina, on May 27, 2022.

=== Music ===
One of Dempsey's passions outside of soccer is hip hop music. Using the alias "Deuce", he, along with fellow Texas rappers XO and the late Houston rapper Big Hawk from the Screwed Up Click, is featured rapping the song "Don't Tread" in a Nike soccer advertising campaign for the 2006 World Cup, with the intention to showcase both the sport's working-class roots and the United States team ahead of the World Cup. The song's video is dedicated to his sister Jennifer. The video ends with a shot of Dempsey placing a flower at his sister's grave.

== Endorsements ==
Dempsey, along with global cover star Lionel Messi, was featured on the cover of EA Sports' multi-platform video game FIFA 15 in the U.S. and Canada.

Dempsey has been sponsored by sportswear brand Nike throughout his playing career.

== Career statistics ==
=== Club ===
Appearances and goals by club, season and competition
Club	Season	League			National cup (Note: Includes U.S. Open Cup, FA Cup)		League cup (Note: Includes Football League Cup)		Continental		Other		Total	
Club	Season	Division	Apps	Goals	Apps	Goals	Apps	Goals	Apps	Goals	Apps	Goals	Apps	Goals
New England Revolution	2004	MLS	24	7	1	0	—		—		3 (Note: Appearances in MLS Cup playoffs)	0	28	7
New England Revolution	2005	MLS	26	10	0	0	—		—		4	1	30	11
New England Revolution	2006	MLS	21	8	1	0	—		2 (Note: Appearances in CONCACAF Champions Cup)	0	2	0	26	8
New England Revolution	Total		71	25	2	0	0	0	2	0	9	1	84	26
Fulham	2006–07	Premier League	10	1	2	0	—		—		—		12	1
Fulham	2007–08	Premier League	36	6	2	0	2	0	—		—		40	6
Fulham	2008–09	Premier League	35	7	5	1	1	0	—		—		41	8
Fulham	2009–10	Premier League	29	7	2	0	0	0	13 (Note: Appearances in UEFA Europa League)	2	—		44	9
Fulham	2010–11	Premier League	37	12	3	0	2	1	—		—		42	13
Fulham	2011–12	Premier League	37	17	2	3	0	0	7 (Note: Soccerbase's stats for the Europa League play-off second leg match between Fulham and Dnipro Dnipropetrovsk on 25 August 2011 don't include any of the appearance data for the players that featured in that game. Clint Dempsey did play in that game, and therefore, until and unless they correct it, he should have one more appearance for Fulham than given on his Soccerbase page.)	3	—		46	23
Fulham	Total		184	50	16	4	5	1	20	5	0	0	225	60
Tottenham Hotspur	2012–13	Premier League	29	7	2	3	2	0	10	2	—		43	12
Seattle Sounders FC	2013	MLS	9	1	—		—		—		3	0	12	1
Seattle Sounders FC	2014	MLS	26	15	1	1	—		—		4	1	31	17
Seattle Sounders FC	2015	MLS	20	10	1	0	—		0	0	3	2	24	12
Seattle Sounders FC	2016	MLS	17	8	0	0	—		2 (Note: Appearances in CONCACAF Champions League)	2	0	0	19	10
Seattle Sounders FC	2017	MLS	29	12	0	0	—		—		4	3	33	15
Seattle Sounders FC	2018	MLS	14	1	0	0	—		3	1	0	0	17	2
Seattle Sounders FC	Total		115	47	2	1	0	0	5	3	14	6	136	57
Fulham (loan)	2013–14	Premier League	5	0	2	0	—		—		—		7	0
Career total			404	129	24	8	7	1	37	10	23	7	495	155

=== International ===
Appearances and goals by national team and year
National team	Year	Apps	Goals
United States	2004	1	0
United States	2005	13	2
United States	2006	9	4
United States	2007	13	3
United States	2008	10	4
United States	2009	14	4
United States	2010	8	2
United States	2011	14	5
United States	2012	9	6
United States	2013	10	6
United States	2014	9	3
United States	2015	10	9
United States	2016	10	4
United States	2017	11	5
Total		141	57

== Honors ==
Furman Paladins

- Conference Tournament: 2001, 2002
- Conference Regular Season: 2001, 2002

New England Revolution

- Eastern Conference Playoffs: 2005, 2006
- Eastern Conference Regular Season: 2005

Fulham

- UEFA Europa League runner-up: 2009–10

Seattle Sounders

- MLS Cup: 2016
- Supporters' Shield: 2014
- Western Conference Playoffs: 2016, 2017
- Western Conference Regular Season: 2014
- U.S. Open Cup: 2014

United States

- FIFA Confederations Cup runner-up: 2009
- CONCACAF Gold Cup: 2005, 2007, 2017

Individual

- All-American: 2002
- MLS Rookie of the Year: 2004
- MLS Best XI: 2005, 2006
- MLS All-Star: 2005, 2014, 2015, 2016
- Honda Player of the Year: 2006, 2011, 2012
- U.S. Soccer Player of the Year: 2007, 2011, 2012
- FIFA Confederations Cup Bronze Ball: 2009
- FIFA Confederations Cup Team of the Tournament: 2009
- Fulham Player of the Season: 2010–11, 2011–12
- Fulham Top Scorer: 2010–11, 2011–12
- CONCACAF Gold Cup Golden Boot: 2015
- MLS Comeback Player of the Year: 2017
- IFFHS CONCACAF Team of the Decade: 2011–2020
- IFFHS CONCACAF Men's Team of All Time: 2021
- National Soccer Hall of Fame: 2022

== See also ==
- List of top international men's football goal scorers by country
- List of men's footballers with 100 or more international caps
- List of men's footballers with 50 or more international goals
