= Netherlands national football team records and statistics =

This page details Netherlands men's national football team records; the most capped players, the players with the most goals, Netherlands' match record by opponent and decade.

== Honours ==
=== Major tournaments ===
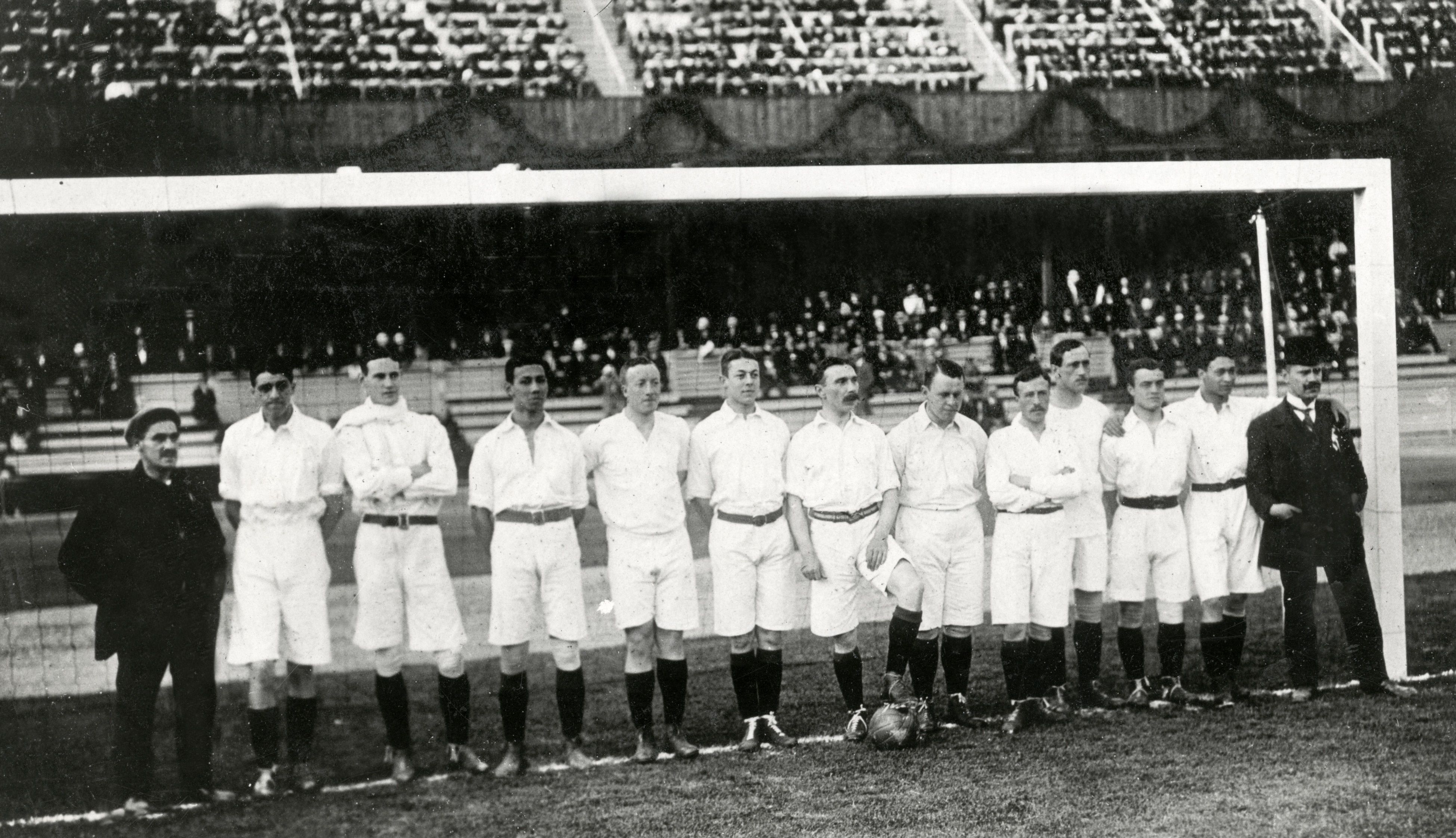
The bronze medalists of the 1912 Summer Olympics

- FIFA World Cup:
  - Runners-up (3): 1974, 1978, 2010
  - Third place (1): 2014
  - Fourth place (1): 1998
- UEFA European Championship:
  - Winners (1): 1988
  - Third place (1): 1976
  - Semi-finals (4): 1992, 2000, 2004, 2024
- UEFA Nations League:
  - Runners-up (1): 2019
  - Fourth place (1): 2023
- Olympic football tournament:

- Bronze medal/Third place (3): 1908, 1912, 1920
- Fourth place (1): 1924

=== Friendly tournaments ===
- Olympic Football Consolation Tournament
  - Winners: 1928
- Tournoi de Paris
  - Winners: 1978
- 75th Anniversary FIFA Cup
  - Runners-up: 1979
- World Champions' Gold Cup
  - Fourth Place: 1980
- Copa Confraternidad
  - Runners-up: 2011

== Individual records ==
=== Player records ===
Still active players are highlighted

==== Most-capped players ====
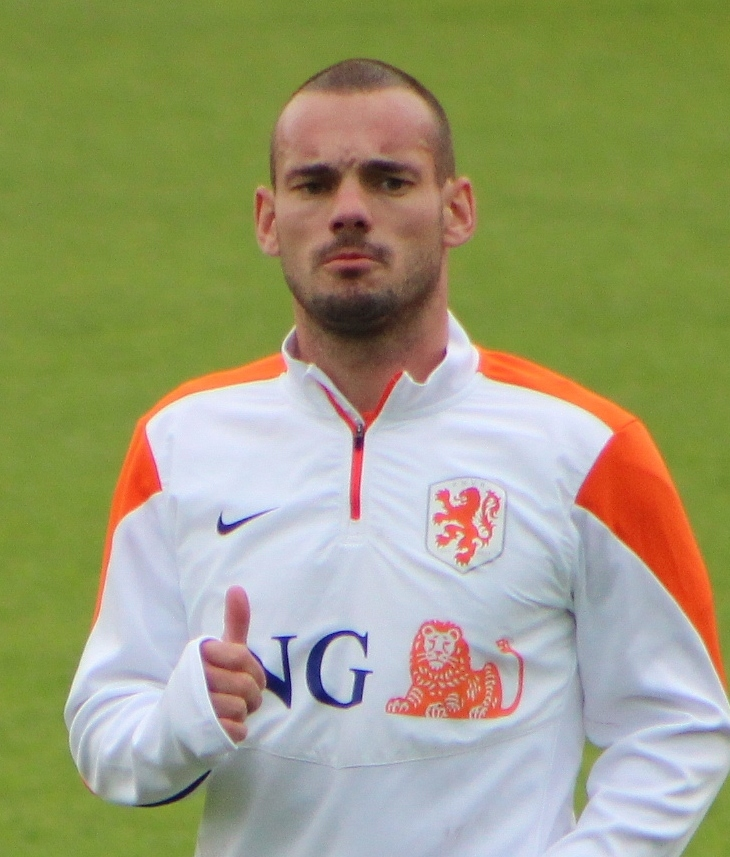
Wesley Sneijder is the most capped player in the history of Netherlands with 134 appearances.

Rank	Player	National career	Matches	Goals	Minutes	Total career
1	Wesley Sneijder	2003–2018	134	31	9,811	2002–2019
2	Edwin van der Sar	1995–2008	130	0	11,463	1990–2011
3	Frank de Boer	1990–2004	112	13	9,271	1988–2005
3	Memphis Depay	2013–	112	55	8,170	2013–
5	Rafael van der Vaart	2001–2013	109	25	6,938	2000–2018
6	Daley Blind	2013–2024	108	3	9,032	2008–
7	Giovanni van Bronckhorst	1996–2010	106	6	8,215	1993–2010
8	Dirk Kuyt	2004–2014	104	24	6,875	1998–2017
9	Robin van Persie	2005–2017	102	50	7,317	2001–2019
10	Phillip Cocu	1996–2006	101	10	8,001	1988–2006

Last updated: 29 June 2026
Source:http://www.voetbalstats.nl/caps.php voetbalstats.nl] (in Dutch)

==== Past most-capped record holders ====
Feyenoord legend Puck van Heel has held the record the longest for 42 years.

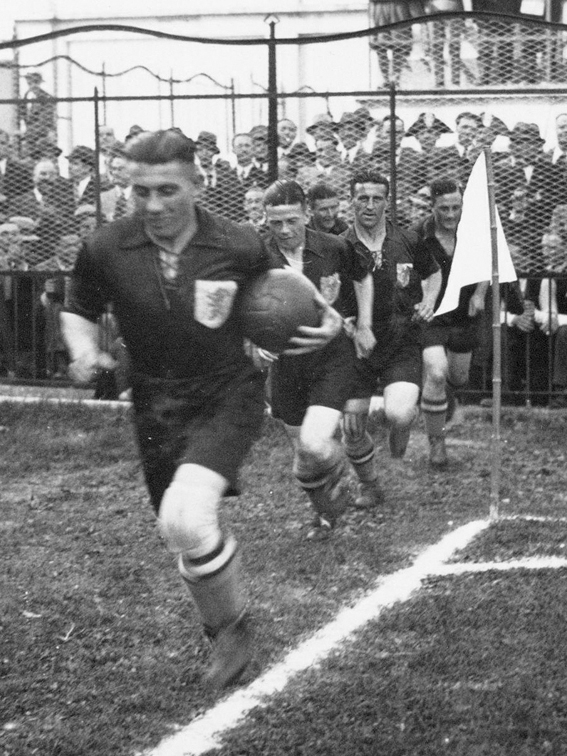
Puck van Heel (in front) has held the cap record for the longest time, 42 years.

Rank	Player	Period record held	Caps record established	Date record established	National career	Matches	Goals
1	Ben Stom	1907–1909	5	1 April 1907	1905–1908	9	0
2	Reinier Beeuwkes	1909–1911	13	12 April 1909	1905–1910	19	0
3	Bok de Korver	1911–1925	20	2 April 1911	1905–1913	31	2
4	Harry Dénis	1925–1937	32	25 October 1925	1919–1930	56	0
5	Puck van Heel	1937–1979	57	2 May 1937	1925–1938	64	0
6	Ruud Krol	1979–2000	65	22 May 1979	1969–1983	83	4
7	Aron Winter	2000–2000	84	29 June 2000	1987–2000	84	6
8	Frank de Boer	2000–2006	85	25 November 2000	1990–2004	112	13
9	Edwin van der Sar	2006–2017	113	25 June 2006	1995–2008	130	0
10	Wesley Sneijder	2017–	131	9 June 2017	2003–2018	134	31

Last updated: 1 April 2024
Source: (in Dutch)

==== Top goalscorers ====
Striker Memphis Depay, while playing for Corinthians, became the top scorer in the history of Netherlands.

Rank	Player	National career	Goals	Matches	Average	Minutes	Total career
1	Memphis Depay	2013–	55	112	0.49	8,170	2013–
2	Robin van Persie	2005–2017	50	102	0.47	7,439	2001–2019
3	Klaas-Jan Huntelaar	2006–2015	42	76	0.55	4,399	2002–2021
4	Patrick Kluivert	1994–2004	40	79	0.51	5,816	1994–2008
5	Dennis Bergkamp	1990–2000	37	79	0.47	6,339	1986–2006
5	Arjen Robben	2003–2017	37	96	0.39	7,394	2000–2021
7	Faas Wilkes	1946–1961	35	38	0.92	3,450	1940–1964
7	Ruud van Nistelrooy	1998–2011	35	70	0.50	4,543	1993–2012
9	Abe Lenstra	1940–1959	33	47	0.70	4,260	1935–1963
9	Johan Cruyff	1966–1977	33	48	0.69	4,282	1964–1984

Last updated: 29 June 2026
Source: voetbalstats.nl (in Dutch)

==== Record holding top goalscorers ====
Eddy de Neve is the Netherlands first topscorer with 3 caps and 6 goals. To date he still holds the highest goal average, among top scorers.

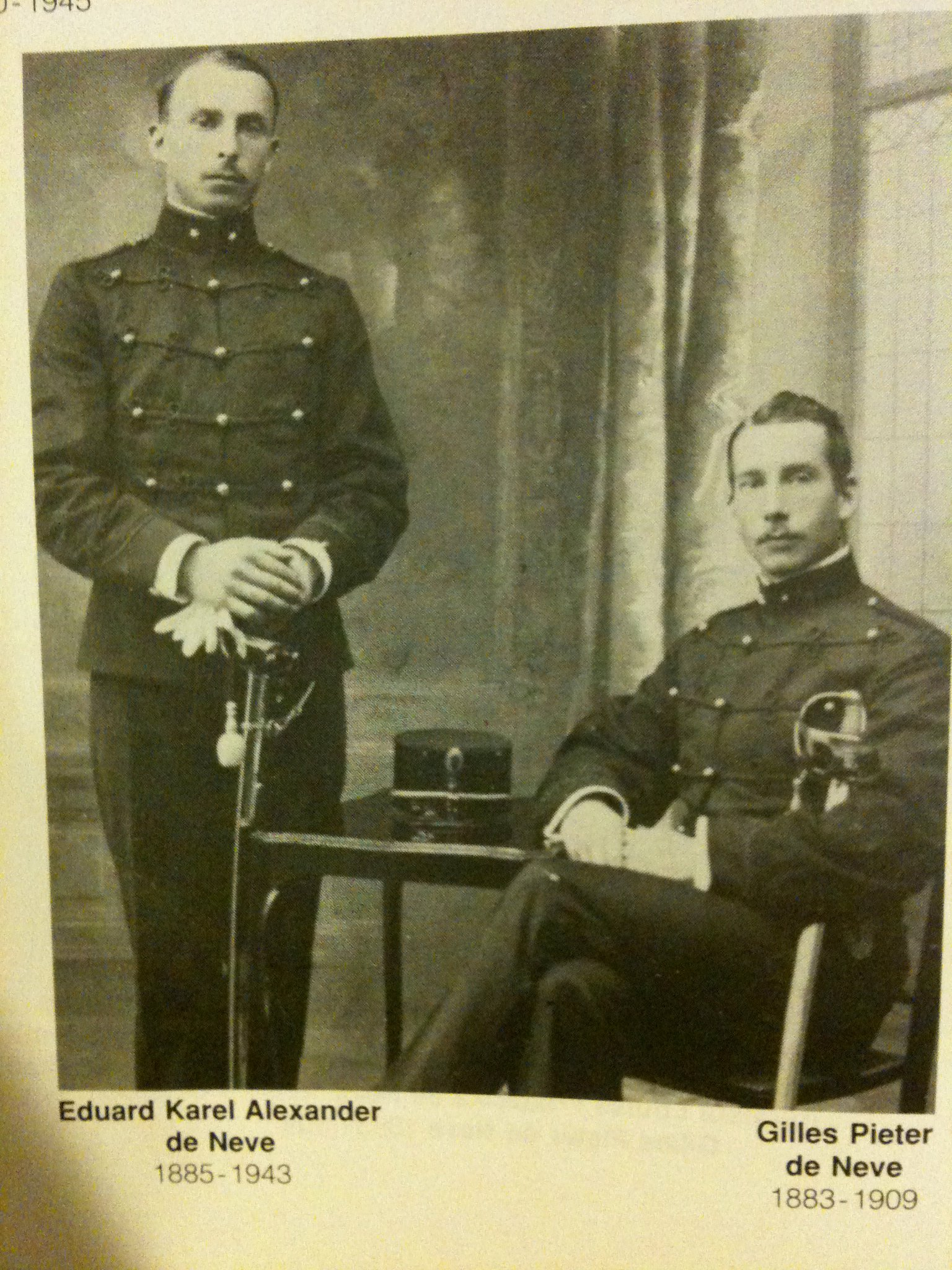
Eddy de Neve (left) with his brother Gilles in 1909.

Rank	Player	Period record held	Goals record established	Date record established	National career	Goals	Matches	Average
1	Eddy de Neve	1905–1908	5	14 May 1905	1905–1906	6	3	2.00
2	Edu Snethlage	1909–1910	7	21 March 1909	1907–1909	10	11	0.91
3	Jan Thomée	1910–1912	11	16 October 1910	1907–1912	16	16	1.00
4	Mannes Francken	1913–1935	17	9 March 1913	1906–1914	17	22	0.77
5	Beb Bakhuys	1935–1958	18	3 November 1935	1928–1937	28	23	1.22
6	Abe Lenstra	1958–1959	29	23 April 1958	1940–1959	33	47	0.70
7	Faas Wilkes	1959–1998	34	4 November 1959	1946–1961	35	38	0.92
8	Dennis Bergkamp	1998–1999	36	4 July 1998	1990–2000	37	79	0.47
9	Patrick Kluivert	2003–2013	38	7 June 2003	1994–2004	40	79	0.51
10	Robin van Persie	2013–2025	41	11 October 2013	2005–2017	50	112	0.45
11	Memphis Depay	2025–	51	7 September 2025	2013–	55	112	0.49

Last updated: 29 June 2026
Source: (in Dutch)

==== Hat-tricks ====
Robin van Persie scored four goals for the Dutch national side during their 11–0 win over San Marino on 2 September 2011. He scored three goals in the 2014 FIFA World Cup qualifier against Hungary on 11 October 2013.

Rank	Player	National career	Matches	Hat-tricks	Total career
1	Mannes Francken	1906–1914	22	3	1906–1914
1	Beb Bakhuys	1928–1937	23	3	1925–1939
1	John Bosman	1986–1997	30	3	1983–2002
1	Faas Wilkes	1946–1961	38	3	1945–1964
5	Noud van Melis	1950–1957	13	2	1950–1957
5	Wim Lagendaal	1930–1935	15	2	1930–1935
5	Tonny van der Linden	1957–1963	24	2	1957–1963
5	Rob Rensenbrink	1968–1979	46	2	1965–1982
5	Marco van Basten	1983–1992	58	2	1981–1995
5	Patrick Kluivert	1994–2004	79	2	1994–2008
5	Robin van Persie	2005–2017	102	2	2001–2019
12	25 players			1	

Last updated: 7 June 2024
Source: voetbalstats.nl (in Dutch)

==== Age records ====
- Oldest player: Sander Boschker, aged 39 years and 256 days vs Ghana, 1 June 2010
- Youngest player: Jan van Breda Kolff, aged 17 years and 74 days vs Belgium, 2 April 1911 RSSSF
- Oldest player to score: Abe Lenstra, aged 38 years and 143 days vs Belgium, 19 April 1959
- Youngest player to score: Jan van Breda Kolff, aged 17 years and 74 days vs Belgium, 2 April 1911

==== Progression of the Netherlands goalscoring record ====
This is a progressive list of players who have held or co-held the record for international goals for the Netherlands national team.

For the early decades, records of players appearances and goals were often considered unreliable. RSSSF and IFFHS have spent much effort trying to produce definitive lists of full international matches, and corresponding data on players' international caps and goals. Using this data, the following records can be retrospectively produced. Note that, at the time, these records may not have been recognised.

Player	Goals	Date	Opponent	Score	Notes
Eddy de Neve	4	30 April 1905	Belgium	4–1	De Neve scored four times in this match
Eddy de Neve	5	15 May 1905	Belgium	4–0	
Edu Snethlage	6	25 October 1908	Sweden	5–3	Snethlage scored twice in this match
Edu Snethlage	7	21 March 1909	Belgium	4–1	
Edu Snethlage	10	25 April 1909	Belgium	4–1	Snethlage scored three times in this match
Mannes Francken	11	24 March 1912	Germany	5–5	Francken scored twice in this match
Mannes Francken	14	28 April 1912	Belgium	4–3	Francken scored three times in this match
Mannes Francken	16	17 November 1912	Germany	3–2	Francken scored twice in this match
Mannes Francken	17	9 March 1913	Belgium	3–3	
Wim Tap	17	26 April 1931	Germany	1–1	
Beb Bakhuys	17	12 May 1935	Belgium	2–0	
Beb Bakhuys	18	3 November 1935	Denmark	3–0	
Beb Bakhuys	19	8 December 1935	Republic of Ireland	5–3	
Beb Bakhuys	22	12 January 1936	France	6–1	Bakhuys scored three times in this match
Beb Bakhuys	25	29 March 1936	Belgium	8–0	Bakhuys scored three times in this match
Beb Bakhuys	26	3 May 1936	Belgium	1–1	
Beb Bakhuys	27	1 November 1936	Norway	3–3	
Beb Bakhuys	28	7 March 1937	Switzerland	2–1	
Abe Lenstra	28	13 April 1958	Belgium	7–2	Lenstra scored twice in this match
Faas Wilkes	28	23 April 1958	Netherlands Antilles	8–1	Wilkes scored twice in this match
Abe Lenstra	30	23 April 1958	Netherlands Antilles	8–1	Lenstra scored twice in this match
Abe Lenstra	32	15 October 1958	Denmark	5–1	Lenstra scored twice in this match
Abe Lenstra	33	19 April 1959	Belgium	2–2	
Faas Wilkes	34	4 November 1959	Norway	7–1	Wilkes scored twice in this match
Faas Wilkes	35	19 April 1961	Mexico	1–2	
Dennis Bergkamp	35	29 June 1998	Yugoslavia	2–1	
Dennis Bergkamp	36	4 July 1998	Argentina	2–1	
Dennis Bergkamp	37	9 October 1999	Brazil	2–2	
Patrick Kluivert	37	30 April 2003	Portugal	1–1	
Patrick Kluivert	38	7 June 2003	Belarus	2–0	
Patrick Kluivert	39	6 September 2003	Australia	3–1	
Patrick Kluivert	40	11 October 2003	Moldova	5–0	
Robin van Persie	41	11 October 2013	Hungary	8–1	Van Persie scored three times in this match
Robin van Persie	42	17 May 2014	Ecuador	1–1	
Robin van Persie	43	31 May 2014	Ghana	1–0	
Robin van Persie	45	13 June 2014	Spain	5–1	Van Persie scored twice in this match
Robin van Persie	46	18 June 2014	Australia	3–2	
Robin van Persie	47	12 July 2014	Brazil	3–0	
Robin van Persie	48	10 October 2014	Kazakhstan	3–1	
Robin van Persie	49	16 November 2014	Latvia	6–0	
Robin van Persie	50	13 October 2015	Czech Republic	2–3	
Memphis Depay	50	10 June 2025	Malta	8–0	Depay scored twice in this match
Memphis Depay	52	7 September 2025	Lithuania	3–2	Depay scored twice in this match
Memphis Depay	53	9 October 2025	Malta	4–0	
Memphis Depay	54	12 October 2025	Finland	4–0	
Memphis Depay	55	14 November 2025	Poland	1–1	

== Team records ==
=== Tournament records ===
- The Netherlands used all 23 players during the 2014 World Cup, making it the first team in World Cup history to ever use all of its squad players.
- World Cup appearances: 12 (most recent in 2026)
- Most successful World Cup appearance: Runners-up (1974, 1978, 2010)
- European Championship appearances: 11 (most recent in 2024)
- Most successful European Championship appearance: Winners (1988)
- Summer Olympics appearances: 8 (most recent in 2008)
- Most successful Olympics appearance: Third place (1908, 1912, 1920)

=== Match records ===
==== Firsts ====
- First match: Belgium 1–4 Netherlands (Antwerp, Belgium; 30 April 1905)
- First World Cup finals match: Switzerland 3–2 Netherlands (Milan, Italy; 27 May 1934)
- First European Championship finals match: Netherlands 1–3 Czechoslovakia (Zagreb, Yugoslavia; 16 June 1976)

==== Record results ====
- Biggest win:
  - Netherlands 11–0 San Marino (Eindhoven, Netherlands; 2 September 2011)
- Biggest loss:
  - England AM. 12–2 Netherlands (Darlington, England; 21 December 1907)

== Head-to-head records ==
As of 4 October 2026.

Note: * Draws include penalty shoot-outs. Positive Record Neutral Record Negative Record

Opponent	Pld	W	D*	L	GF	GA	GD	%	Last match
Albania	4	4	0	0	7	1	+6	100%	2007/09/12
Algeria	1	0	0	1	0	1	–1	0%	2026/06/03
Andorra	6	6	0	0	21	0	+21	100%	2013/09/10
Argentina	10	4	5	1	15	8	+7	65%	2022/12/09
Armenia	2	2	0	0	3	0	+3	100%	2005/09/03
Australia	4	1	2	1	5	5	0	50%	2014/06/18
Austria	21	10	4	7	40	27	+13	57.1%	2024/06/25
Belarus	10	8	0	2	23	6	+17	80%	2019/10/13
Belgium	129	57	31	41	285	221	+64	56.2%	2022/09/25
Bosnia and Herzegovina	4	2	2	0	9	4	+5	50.00%	2024/11/19
Brazil	12	4	5	3	18	15	+3	54.2%	2014/07/12
Bulgaria	12	5	2	5	20	17	+3	50%	2017/09/03
Cameroon	3	2	1	0	3	1	+2	83.3%	2010/06/24
Canada	2	2	0	0	7	0	+7	100%	2024/06/06
Chile	2	1	1	0	4	2	+2	62.5%	2014/06/23
China	2	2	0	0	4	0	+4	100%	2013/06/11
Colombia	1	0	1	0	0	0	0	50%	2013/11/19
Costa Rica	1	0	1	0	0	0	0	50%	2014/07/05
Croatia	3	1	0	2	6	6	0	33.3%	2023/06/14
Curaçao (Note: Includes matches against the Netherlands Antilles.)	3	2	1	0	16	1	+15	83.3%	1958/04/23
Cyprus	9	9	0	0	34	1	+33	100%	2001/04/25
Czech Republic (Note: Includes matches against Czechoslovakia.)	22	6	4	12	30	36	−6	36.4%	2021/06/27
Denmark	32	13	10	9	63	45	+18	56.3%	2022/03/26
East Germany	9	6	1	2	17	10	+7	72.2%	1986/03/12
Ecuador	4	1	3	0	4	3	+1	25.00%	2026/03/31
Egypt	2	0	1	1	1	2	−1	25%	1990/06/12
England (Note: Includes matches against England Amateurs.)	33	9	10	14	40	76	−36	42.5%	2024/07/10
Estonia	6	5	1	0	23	4	+19	91.7%	2019/11/19
Faroe Islands	1	1	0	0	3	0	+3	100%	2004/06/01
Finland	16	13	2	1	49	14	+35	81.25%	2025/10/12
France	31	11	5	15	57	53	+4	43.5%	2024/06/21
Georgia	1	1	0	0	3	0	+3	100%	2021/06/06
Germany (Note: Includes matches against West Germany.)	49	12	19	18	80	91	−11	24.48%	2026/09/24
Ghana	3	2	1	0	5	1	+4	83.3%	2014/05/31
Gibraltar	4	4	0	0	22	0	+22	100.00%	2023/11/21
Great Britain	2	0	0	2	3	8	−5	0%	1948/07/31
Greece	12	9	2	1	26	5	+21	75.00%	2026/10/01
Hungary	19	11	3	5	56	30	+26	57.89%	2024/11/16
Indonesia	1	1	0	0	3	0	+3	100%	2013/06/07
Iceland	13	10	1	2	37	7	+30	80.8%	2024/06/10
Iran	1	1	0	0	3	0	+3	100%	1978/06/03
Israel	4	4	0	0	6	1	+5	100%	1989/01/04
Ivory Coast	2	2	0	0	7	1	+6	100%	2017/06/04
Italy	24	3	10	11	24	33	−9	33.3%	2023/06/17
Japan	4	2	2	0	8	4	+4	50.00%	2026/06/14
Kazakhstan	2	2	0	0	5	2	+3	100.00%	2015/10/10
Latvia	5	5	0	0	14	0	+14	100%	2021/10/08
Liechtenstein	1	1	0	0	3	0	+3	100%	2004/09/03
Lithuania	2	2	0	0	7	2	+5	100%	2025/11/17
Luxembourg	18	15	1	2	67	14	+53	86.1%	2017/06/09
Malta	8	8	0	0	40	0	+40	100%	2025/10/09
Mexico	9	4	1	4	15	16	-1	50%	2020/10/07
Moldova	4	4	0	0	9	1	+8	100%	2011/10/07
Montenegro	2	1	1	0	6	2	+4	62.5%	2021/11/13
Morocco	4	2	1	1	6	5	+1	50.0%	2026/06/30
Nigeria	1	1	0	0	5	1	+4	100%	1998/06/05
North Macedonia	5	3	2	0	11	3	+8	80%	2021/06/21
Northern Ireland	8	4	3	1	17	5	+12	68.8%	2019/11/16
Norway	23	11	7	5	49	29	+20	47.82%	2026/03/27
Paraguay	2	1	1	0	5	1	+4	62.5%	2009/11/18
Peru	4	3	1	0	7	1	+6	87.5%	2018/09/06
Poland	22	10	9	3	32	22	+10	45.45%	2025/11/14
Portugal	14	2	4	8	10	16	−6	28.6%	2019/06/09
Qatar	1	1	0	0	2	0	+2	100%	2022/11/29
Republic of Ireland	24	13	4	7	43	30	+13	62.5%	2023/11/18
Romania	15	11	3	1	32	3	+29	83.3%	2024/07/02
Russia (Note: Includes matches against the Soviet Union and the CIS.)	11	4	3	4	14	11	+5	36.3%	2008/08/20
Saar	2	2	0	0	5	3	+2	100%	1956/06/06
San Marino	6	6	0	0	39	0	+39	100%	2011/09/02
Saudi Arabia	1	1	0	0	2	1	+1	100%	1994/06/20
Scotland	20	10	5	5	32	15	+17	62.5%	2024/03/22
Senegal	1	1	0	0	2	0	+2	100%	2022/11/21
Serbia	2	2	0	0	4	2	+2	100%	2026/10/04
Serbia and Montenegro (Note: Includes matches against Yugoslavia.)	10	6	1	3	18	12	+6	65%	2006/06/11
Slovakia	13	5	2	6	21	20	+1	46.2%	2018/05/31
Slovenia	2	2	0	0	3	0	+3	100%	2007/10/17
South Africa	2	2	0	0	4	1	+3	100%	1997/06/04
South Korea	2	2	0	0	7	0	+7	100%	2007/06/02
Spain	15	6	4	5	24	23	+1	40.00%	2025/03/23
Suriname	1	1	0	0	4	3	+1	100%	1960/07/03
Sweden	26	12	6	8	52	49	+3	46.15%	2026/06/20
Switzerland	33	15	3	15	68	61	+7	50%	2011/11/11
Thailand	1	1	0	0	3	1	+2	100%	2007/06/06
Tunisia	4	2	2	0	10	4	+6	50.0%	2026/06/25
Turkey	15	7	4	4	23	15	+7	60%	2024/07/06
Ukraine	3	2	1	0	7	3	+4	83.3%	2021/06/13
Uruguay	6	2	1	3	7	9	−2	41.7%	2011/06/08
United States	6	5	0	1	13	6	+7	83.3%	2022/12/03
Uzbekistan	1	1	0	0	2	1	+1	100%	2026/06/08
Wales	10	10	0	0	29	8	+21	100%	2022/06/14
Yugoslavia	9	5	1	3	17	12	+5	61.1%	2000/06/25
Total	910	465	202	243	1,884	1,150	+735	51.09%	2026/10/04

== Rankings ==
=== FIFA ===
- Highest FIFA Rank: 1 (August 2011)
- Lowest FIFA Rank: 32 (April 2017)
- FIFA Team of the Year First place: 1

2000

- FIFA Team of the Year Third place: 3

2005, 2008, 2009

=== Elo ===
- Highest Elo ranking: 1
  (June 1978, June 1988 – June 1990, June–September 1992, June 2002, June–September 2003, October 2005, June 2008, July 2010, June 2014)
- Lowest Elo Ranking: 56 (October 1954)
