= History of the Netherlands national football team =

Netherlands
- Nickname(s): Oranje; Holland; Clockwork Orange; The Flying Dutchmen; La Naranja Mecanica
- Association: Koninklijke Nederlandse Voetbalbond (KNVB)
- Confederation: UEFA (Europe)
- Most caps: Wesley Sneijder (134)
- Top scorer: Memphis Depay (55) Previous top scorers: Robin van Persie (50) (Note: 11 October 2013 – 7 September 2025); Patrick Kluivert (40) (Note: 30 April 2003 – 11 October 2013); Dennis Bergkamp (37) (Note: 29 June 1998 – 7 June 2003); Faas Wilkes (35) (Note: 4 November 1959 – 4 July 1998); Abe Lenstra (33) (Note: April 23, 1958 – 4 November 1959); Bep Bakhuys (28) (Note: 12 May 1935 – 23 April 1958)
- Home stadium: De Kuip (51,117) (Note: 1937– 118 matches); Amsterdam Arena (53,052) (Note: 1996– 54 matches); Philips Stadion (36,000) (Note: 1971– 30 matches) Previous home stadiums: Olympic Stadium (64,000) (Note: 1928–1989 77 matches); Het Stadion (30,000) (Note: 1914–1928 25 matches); Sparta Stadium (20,000) (Note: 1905–1928 8 matches); De Galgenwaard (24,500) (Note: 1967–2004 8 matches); De Meer (22,000) (Note: 1975–1992 5 matches); GelreDome (30,000) (Note: 1998–2001 5 matches)

FIFA ranking
- Highest: 1 (August 2011)
- Lowest: 36 (August 2017)

First international
- Belgium 1–4 Netherlands (Antwerp, Belgium; 30 April 1905)

World Cup
- Appearances: 12 (first in 1934)
- Best result: Runners-up (1974, 1978, 2010)

European Championship
- Appearances: 11 (first in 1976)
- Best result: Champions (1988)

The history of the Netherlands national football team began when the Netherlands played their first international match on 30 April 1905 in Antwerp against Belgium. The game went into extra time, in which the Dutch scored three times, making the score 4–1 for the Dutch side, winning the Coupe Vanden Abeele.

The Netherlands national football team made its first appearance at the FIFA World Cup in 1934, Italy. The Dutch hold the record for playing the most World Cup finals without ever winning the tournament. They finished second in the 1974, 1978 and 2010 World Cups, losing to West Germany, Argentina and Spain respectively. Oranje reached third place in 2014. They won the UEFA European Championship in 1988.

== History ==
Chronological record of the Netherlands at major tournaments
Competition	Year	Round	Position	Pld	W	D*	L	GF	GA
Olympic Games	(United Kingdom) 1908	Third place	3rd	2	1	0	1	2	4
Olympic Games	(Sweden) 1912	Third place	3rd	4	3	0	1	17	8
Olympic Games	(Belgium) 1920	Third place	3rd	4	2	0	2	9	10
Olympic Games	(France) 1924	Fourth place	4th	5	2	1	2	11	7
Olympic Games	(Netherlands) 1928	Round of 16	9th	1	0	0	1	0	2
FIFA World Cup	(Uruguay) 1930	Did not enter							
FIFA World Cup	(Italy) 1934	Round of 16	9th	1	0	0	1	2	3
FIFA World Cup	(France) 1938	Round of 16	14th	1	0	0	1	0	3
Olympic Games	(United Kingdom) 1948	First round	9th	2	1	0	1	6	5
FIFA World Cup	(Brazil) 1950	Did not enter							
Olympic Games	(Finland) 1952	Preliminary round	23rd	1	0	0	1	1	5
FIFA World Cup	(Switzerland) 1954	Did not enter							
FIFA World Cup	(Sweden) 1958	Did not qualify							
European Championship	(France) 1960	Did not enter							
FIFA World Cup	(Chile) 1962	Did not qualify							
European Championship	(Spain) 1964	Did not qualify							
FIFA World Cup	(England) 1966	Did not qualify							
European Championship	(Italy) 1968	Did not qualify							
FIFA World Cup	(Mexico) 1970	Did not qualify							
European Championship	(Belgium) 1972	Did not qualify							
FIFA World Cup	(West Germany) 1974	Runners-up	2nd	7	5	1	1	15	3
European Championship	(Socialist Federal Republic of Yugoslavia) 1976	Third place	3rd	2	1	0	1	4	5
FIFA World Cup	(Argentina) 1978	Runners-up	2nd	7	3	2	2	15	10
European Championship	(Italy) 1980	Group stage	5th	3	1	1	1	4	4
FIFA World Cup	(Spain) 1982	Did not qualify							
European Championship	(France) 1984	Did not qualify							
FIFA World Cup	(Mexico) 1986	Did not qualify							
European Championship	(West Germany) 1988	Champions	1st	5	4	0	1	8	3
FIFA World Cup	(Italy) 1990	Round of 16	15th	4	0	3	1	3	4
European Championship	(Sweden) 1992	Semi-finals	3rd	4	2	2	0	6	3
FIFA World Cup	(United States) 1994	Quarter-finals	7th	5	3	0	2	8	6
European Championship	(England) 1996	Quarter-finals	8th	4	1	2	1	3	4
FIFA World Cup	(France) 1998	Fourth place	4th	7	3	3	1	13	7
European Championship	(Netherlands) (Belgium) 2000	Semi-finals	3rd	5	4	1	0	13	3
FIFA World Cup	(South Korea) (Japan) 2002	Did not qualify							
European Championship	(Portugal) 2004	Semi-finals	4th	5	1	2	2	7	6
FIFA World Cup	(Germany) 2006	Round of 16	11th	4	2	1	1	3	2
European Championship	(Austria) (Switzerland) 2008	Quarter-finals	6th	4	3	0	1	10	4
FIFA World Cup	(South Africa) 2010	Runners-up	2nd	7	6	0	1	12	6
European Championship	(Poland) (Ukraine) 2012	Group stage	15th	3	0	0	3	2	5
FIFA World Cup	(Brazil) 2014	Third place	3rd	7	5	2	0	15	4
European Championship	(France) 2016	Did not qualify							
FIFA World Cup	(Russia) 2018	Did not qualify							
European Championship	(Europe) 2020	Round of 16	9th	4	3	0	1	8	4
FIFA World Cup	(Qatar) 2022	Quarter-finals	5th	5	3	2	0	10	4
European Championship	(Germany) 2024	Semi-finals	4th	6	3	1	2	10	7
FIFA World Cup	(Canada) (Mexico) (United States) 2026	Round of 32	17th	4	2	2	0	11	5

=== Early history ===
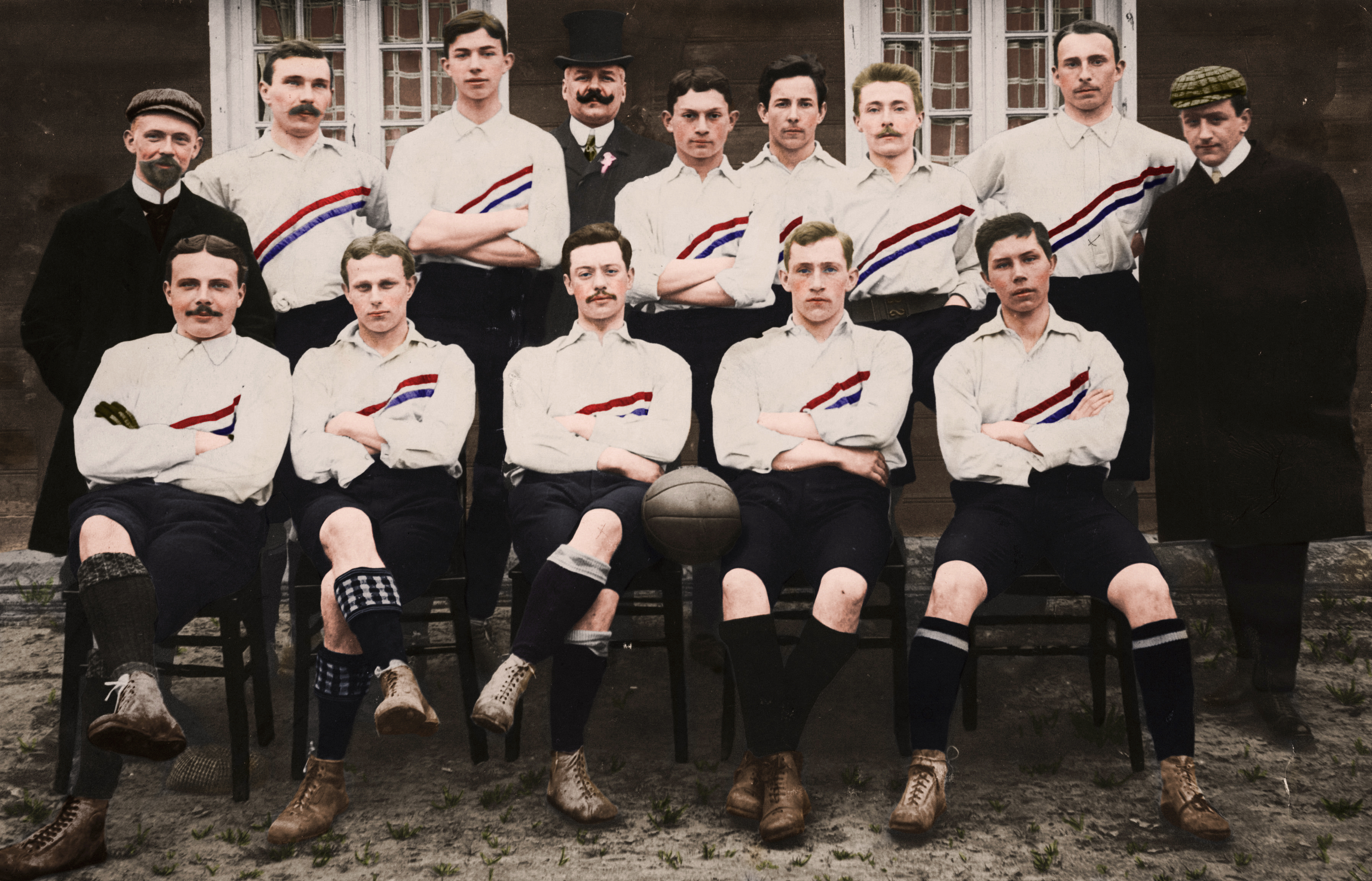
Dutch squad for their first international match

The Netherlands national football team played their first international match in Antwerp against Belgium on 30 April 1905. The players were selected by a five-member commission from the Dutch football association. After 90 minutes, the score was 1–1, but because the match was for a trophy (the "Coupe van den Abeele"), the game went into extra time, in which Eddy de Neve scored three times, making the score 4–1 for the Dutch side.

The Netherlands made their first appearance at the World Cup final tournament in 1934. After a second appearance in 1938 they did not appear in another World Cup until 1974.

==== 1934 FIFA World Cup ====
Rank	Team	Pld	W	D	L	GF	GA	GAv	Pts
1	Netherlands	2	2	0	0	9	4	2.25	4
2	Belgium	2	0	1	1	6	8	0.75	1
3	Irish Free State	2	0	1	1	6	9	0.67	1
—	Finland	Withdrew							

8 April 1934	Netherlands	5 – 2	Irish Free State	Amsterdam, Netherlands
	Smit 41', 85'; Bakhuys 67', 78'; Vente 83'	(Report)	Squires 44'; Moore 57'	Stadium: Olympischstadion; Attendance: 38,000; Referee: Otto Ohlsson (Sweden)

29 April 1934	Belgium	2 – 4	Netherlands	Antwerp, Belgium
	Grimmonprez 51'; Voorhoof 71'	(Report)	Smit 60'; Bakhuys 62', 84'; Vente 64'	Stadium: Bosuil Stadion; Attendance: 42,000; Referee: Stanley Rous (England)

First Round

27 May 1934
16:30 (CEST)

Switzerland	3–2	Netherlands
Kielholz 7', 43'; Abegglen 69'	Report	Smit 19'; Vente 84'

Stadio San Siro, Milan
Attendance: 33,000
Referee: Ivan Eklind (Sweden)

==== 1938 FIFA World Cup ====
Pos.	Team	Pld	W	D	L	GF	GA	GAv	Pts
1	Netherlands	2	1	1	0	5	1	5.00	3
2	Belgium	2	1	1	0	4	3	1.33	3
3	Luxembourg	2	0	0	2	2	7	0.29	0
—	Denmark	Withdrew							

28 November 1937	Netherlands	4 – 0	Luxembourg	Rotterdam, Netherlands
	Smit 29' de Boer 68', 78', 82'	Report		Stadium: Stadion Feyenoord; Attendance: 40,000; Referee: Karl Weingarter (Austria)

3 April 1938	Belgium	1 – 1	Netherlands	Antwerp, Belgium
	Isemborghs 53'	Report	van Spaandonck 37'	Stadium: Bosuil Stadion; Attendance: 47,660; Referee: Arthur Jewell (England)

First Round

5 June 1938
18:30 (WEST)

Czechoslovakia	3–0 (a.e.t.)	Netherlands
Košťálek 93'; Nejedlý 111'; Zeman 118'	Report

Stade municipal, Le Havre
Attendance: 11,000
Referee: Lucien Leclerq (France)

=== Failure: 1958–74 ===
==== 1958 FIFA World Cup ====
Rank	Team	Pts	Pld	W	D	L	GF	GA	GAv
1	Austria	7	4	3	1	0	14	3	4.67
2	Netherlands	5	4	2	1	1	12	7	1.71
3	Luxembourg	0	4	0	0	4	3	19	0.16

==== 1962 FIFA World Cup ====
Rank	Team	Pts	Pld	W	D	L	GF	GA	GD
1	Hungary	7	4	3	1	0	11	5	+6
2	Netherlands	2	3	0	2	1	4	7	−3
3	East Germany	1	3	0	1	2	3	6	−3

==== 1964 European Nations' Cup ====
Preliminary round

Team 1	Agg.	Team 2	1st leg	2nd leg
Netherlands	4–2	Switzerland	3–1	1–1

First round

Team 1	Agg.	Team 2	1st leg	2nd leg
Netherlands	2–3	Luxembourg	1–1	1–2

==== 1966 FIFA World Cup ====
Rank	Team	Pts	Pld	W	D	L	GF	GA	GD
1	Switzerland	9	6	4	1	1	7	3	+4
2	Northern Ireland	8	6	3	2	1	9	5	+4
3	Netherlands	6	6	2	2	2	6	4	+2
4	Albania	1	6	0	1	5	2	12	−10

==== UEFA Euro 1968 ====
Rank		Pld	W	D	L	GF	GA	GD	Pts
1	Hungary	6	4	1	1	15	5	+10	9
2	East Germany	6	3	1	2	10	10	0	7
3	Netherlands	6	2	1	3	11	11	0	5
4	Denmark	6	1	1	4	6	16	−10	3

==== 1970 FIFA World Cup ====
Rank	Team	Pts	Pld	W	D	L	GF	GA	GD
1	Bulgaria	9	6	4	1	1	12	7	+5
2	Poland	8	6	4	0	2	19	8	+11
3	Netherlands	7	6	3	1	2	9	5	+4
4	Luxembourg	0	6	0	0	6	4	24	−20

==== UEFA Euro 1972 ====
Rank		Pld	W	D	L	GF	GA	GD	Pts
1	Yugoslavia	6	3	3	0	7	2	+5	9
2	Netherlands	6	3	1	2	18	6	+12	7
3	East Germany	6	3	1	2	11	6	+5	7
4	Luxembourg	6	0	1	5	1	23	−22	1

=== Total Football in the 1970s ===
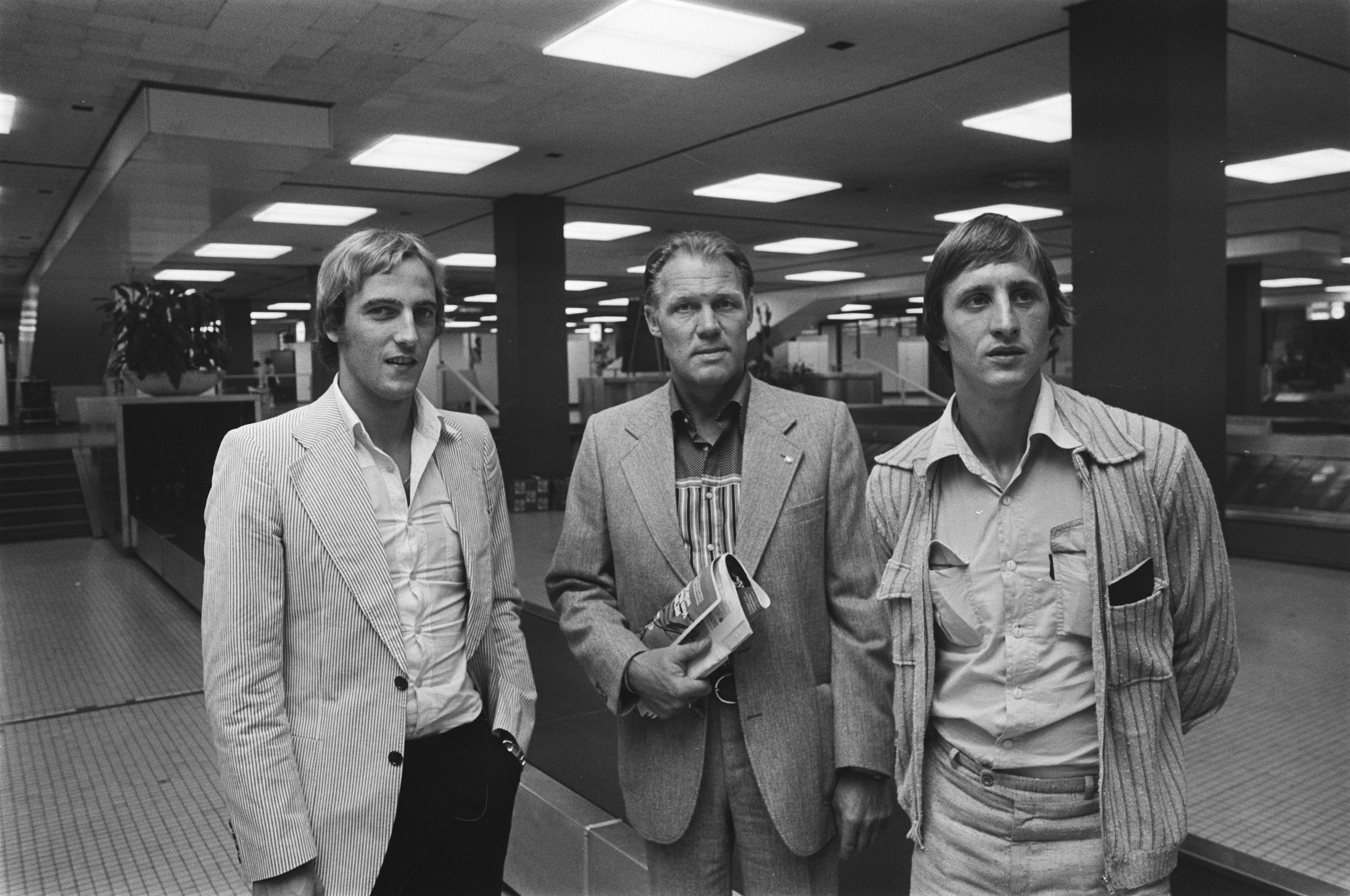
Three of the most notable figures of the Totaalvoetbal school: Johan Neeskens, Rinus Michels and Johan Cruyff

The 1970s saw the invention of Total Football (Dutch: Totaalvoetbal), pioneered by Feyenoord and Ajax and led by playmaker Johan Cruyff and national team coach Rinus Michels. The Dutch made huge strides, qualifying for two World Cup finals in the decade. The captain of the Brazilian team that won the 1970 FIFA World Cup, Carlos Alberto, went on to say "The only team I’ve seen that did things differently was Holland at the 1974 World Cup in Germany. Since then everything looks more or less the same to me…. Their ‘carousel’ style of play was amazing to watch and marvellous for the game."

In 1974, the Netherlands beat both Brazil and Argentina in the second group stage, reaching the final for the first time in their history. However, the team lost to West Germany in the final in Munich, despite having gone 1–0 up through Johan Neeskens' early penalty kick before any German had even touched the ball. However, supported by the crowd, a converted penalty by Paul Breitner and the winner from Gerd Müller led to a victory for the Germans.

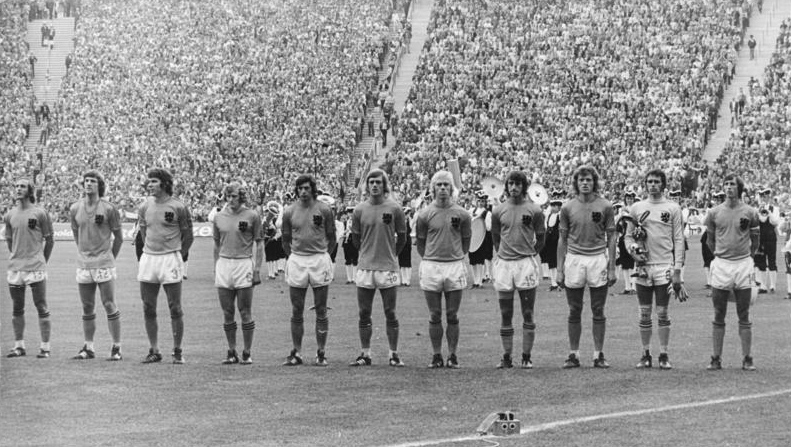
The Dutch team before their 1–2 loss against West Germany in the final of the 1974 World Cup

By comparison, Euro '76 was a disappointment. The Netherlands lost in the semi-finals to Czechoslovakia, as much because of fighting within the squad and the coach George Knobel, as well as the skill of the eventual winners.

In 1978, the Netherlands again reached the final of a World Cup, only to be beaten by the host, this time Argentina. This side played without Johan Cruijff, Willem van Hanegem, and Jan van Beveren, who refused to participate in the World Cup. It still contained Johan Neeskens, Johnny Rep, Arie Haan, Ruud Krol, Wim Jansen, Jan Jongbloed, Wim Suurbier and Rob Rensenbrink from the 1974 selection. The Netherlands were less impressive in the group stages. They qualified as runners-up, after a draw with Peru and a loss to Scotland. In the second group phase, however, the Netherlands topped a group including Italy and West Germany, setting up a final with Argentina. However, the Dutch finished as runners up for the second World Cup in a row as they ultimately lost 3–1 after two extra time goals from Argentina. Unfortunately for the Dutch, Rensenbrink hit the Argentinian post in the last minute of normal time, with the score 1–1.

==== 1974 FIFA World Cup ====
Qualification

Rank	Team	Pts	Pld	W	D	L	GF	GA	GD
1	Netherlands	10	6	4	2	0	24	2	+22
2	Belgium	10	6	4	2	0	12	0	+12
3	Norway	4	6	2	0	4	9	16	−7
4	Iceland	0	6	0	0	6	2	29	−27

Finals

Group Stage

Team	Pld	W	D	L	GF	GA	GD	Pts
Netherlands	3	2	1	0	6	1	+5	5
Sweden	3	1	2	0	3	0	+3	4
Bulgaria	3	0	2	1	2	5	−3	2
Uruguay	3	0	1	2	1	6	−5	1

15 June 1974
16:00 CET

Uruguay	0–2	Netherlands
	Report	Rep 7', 86'

Niedersachsenstadion, Hanover
Attendance: 55,100
Referee: Károly Palotai (Hungary)

19 June 1974
19:30 CET

Netherlands	0–0	Sweden
	Report

Westfalenstadion, Dortmund
Attendance: 53,700
Referee: Werner Winsemann (Canada)

23 June 1974
16:00 CET

Bulgaria	1–4	Netherlands
Krol 78' (o.g.)	Report	Neeskens 5' (pen.), 44' (pen.); Rep 71' de Jong 88'

Westfalenstadion, Dortmund
Attendance: 53,300
Referee: Tony Boskovic (Australia)

Second round

Team	Pld	W	D	L	GF	GA	GD	Pts
Netherlands	3	3	0	0	8	0	+8	6
Brazil	3	2	0	1	3	3	0	4
East Germany	3	0	1	2	1	4	−3	1
Argentina	3	0	1	2	2	7	−5	1

26 June 1974
19:30 CET

Netherlands	4–0	Argentina
Cruyff 11', 90'; Krol 25'; Rep 73'	Report

Parkstadion, Gelsenkirchen
Attendance: 56,548
Referee: Bob Davidson (Scotland)

30 June 1974
16:00 CET

East Germany	0–2	Netherlands
	Report	Neeskens 7'; Rensenbrink 59'

Parkstadion, Gelsenkirchen
Attendance: 68,348
Referee: Rudolf Scheurer (Switzerland)

3 July 1974
19:30 CET

Netherlands	2–0	Brazil
Neeskens 50'; Cruyff 65'	Report

Westfalenstadion, Dortmund
Attendance: 53,700
Referee: Kurt Tschenscher (West Germany)

Final

7 July 1974
16:00 CET

Netherlands	1–2	West Germany
Neeskens 2' (pen.)	Report	Breitner 25' (pen.); Müller 43'

Olympiastadion, Munich
Attendance: 78,200
Referee: Jack Taylor (England)

==== 1978 FIFA World Cup ====
Qualification

Rank	Team	Pts	Pld	W	D	L	GF	GA	GD
1	Netherlands	11	6	5	1	0	11	3	+8
2	Belgium	6	6	3	0	3	7	6	+1
3	Northern Ireland	5	6	2	1	3	7	6	+1
4	Iceland	2	6	1	0	5	2	12	−10

Finals

Group Stage

Team	Pld	W	D	L	GF	GA	GD	Pts
Peru	3	2	1	0	7	2	+5	5
Netherlands	3	1	1	1	5	3	+2	3
Scotland	3	1	1	1	5	6	−1	3
Iran	3	0	1	2	2	8	−6	1

3 June 1978
16:45 ART

Netherlands	3–0	Iran
Rensenbrink 40' (pen.), 62', 78' (pen.)	Report

Estadio Ciudad de Mendoza, Mendoza
Attendance: 33,431
Referee: Alfonso González Archundia (Mexico)

7 June 1978
16:45 ART

Netherlands	0–0	Peru
	Report

Estadio Ciudad de Mendoza, Mendoza
Attendance: 28,125
Referee: Adolf Prokop (East Germany)

11 June 1978
16:45 ART

Scotland	3–2	Netherlands
Dalglish 44'; Gemmill 46' (pen.), 68'	Report	Rensenbrink 34' (pen.); Rep 71'

Estadio Ciudad de Mendoza, Mendoza
Attendance: 35,130
Referee: Erich Linemayr (Austria)

Second round

Team	Pld	W	D	L	GF	GA	GD	Pts
Netherlands	3	2	1	0	9	4	+5	5
Italy	3	1	1	1	2	2	0	3
West Germany	3	0	2	1	4	5	−1	2
Austria	3	1	0	2	4	8	−4	2

14 June 1978
13:45 ART

Austria	1–5	Netherlands
Obermayer 80'	Report	Brandts 6'; Rensenbrink 35' (pen.); Rep 36', 53'; W. van de Kerkhof 82'

Estadio Chateau Carreras, Córdoba
Attendance: 25,050
Referee: John Gordon (Scotland)

18 June 1978
16:45 ART

Netherlands	2–2	West Germany
Haan 27'; R. van de Kerkhof 82'	Report	Abramczik 3'; D. Müller 70'

Estadio Chateau Carreras, Córdoba
Attendance: 40,750
Referee: Ramón Barreto (Uruguay)

21 June 1978
13:45 ART

Italy	1–2	Netherlands
Brandts 19' (o.g.)	Report	Brandts 49'; Haan 76'

Estadio Monumental, Buenos Aires
Attendance: 67,433
Referee: Angel Franco Martínez (Spain)

Final

25 June 1978
15:00 ART

Netherlands	1–3 (a.e.t.)	Argentina
Nanninga 82'	Report	Kempes 37', 104'; Bertoni 115'

Estadio Monumental, Buenos Aires
Attendance: 71,483
Referee: Sergio Gonella (Italy)

==== FIFA 75th Anniversary Cup ====
22 May 1979
20:15

Argentina	0–0	Netherlands
	Report
Penalties
Trossero (penalty scored); Passarella (penalty scored); Houseman (penalty scored); Barbas (penalty scored); Olguín (penalty missed); Maradona (penalty scored); Ardiles (penalty missed); Gallego (penalty scored); Villaverde (penalty scored); Tarantini (penalty scored)	8–7	(penalty scored) Metgod; (penalty missed) R. van de Kerkhof; (penalty scored) Rep; (penalty scored) Hovenkamp; (penalty scored) Neeskens; (penalty scored) Stevens; (penalty missed) Peters; (penalty scored) Krol; (penalty scored) Poortvliet; (penalty missed) Peters

Wankdorf Stadium, Bern
Attendance: 40,000
Referee: Ramón Barreto (Uruguay)

=== Failure: 1982–86 ===
Euro '80 was the last tournament for which the Total Football team qualified, but they did not advance past the group stage, despite the tournament format being expanded that year. Veterans such as Krol and Rensenbrink retired soon afterwards and the Netherlands missed the 1982 World Cup, Euro '84, and the 1986 World Cup in succession. Qualification for Euro 1984 was within reach, but the Dutch ended the campaign on the same number of points as rivals Spain, and the same goal difference (+16). Spain advanced having scored two more goals. The failure to reach the 1986 World Cup was also very close. In a play off with neighbours Belgium, the Netherlands lost 1–0 in Brussels, but were leading 2–0 in the home leg in Rotterdam with a few minutes remaining. Belgium scored to end the tie 2–1, and overall play off 2–2. Belgium advanced on the away goal rule.

=== European champions ===
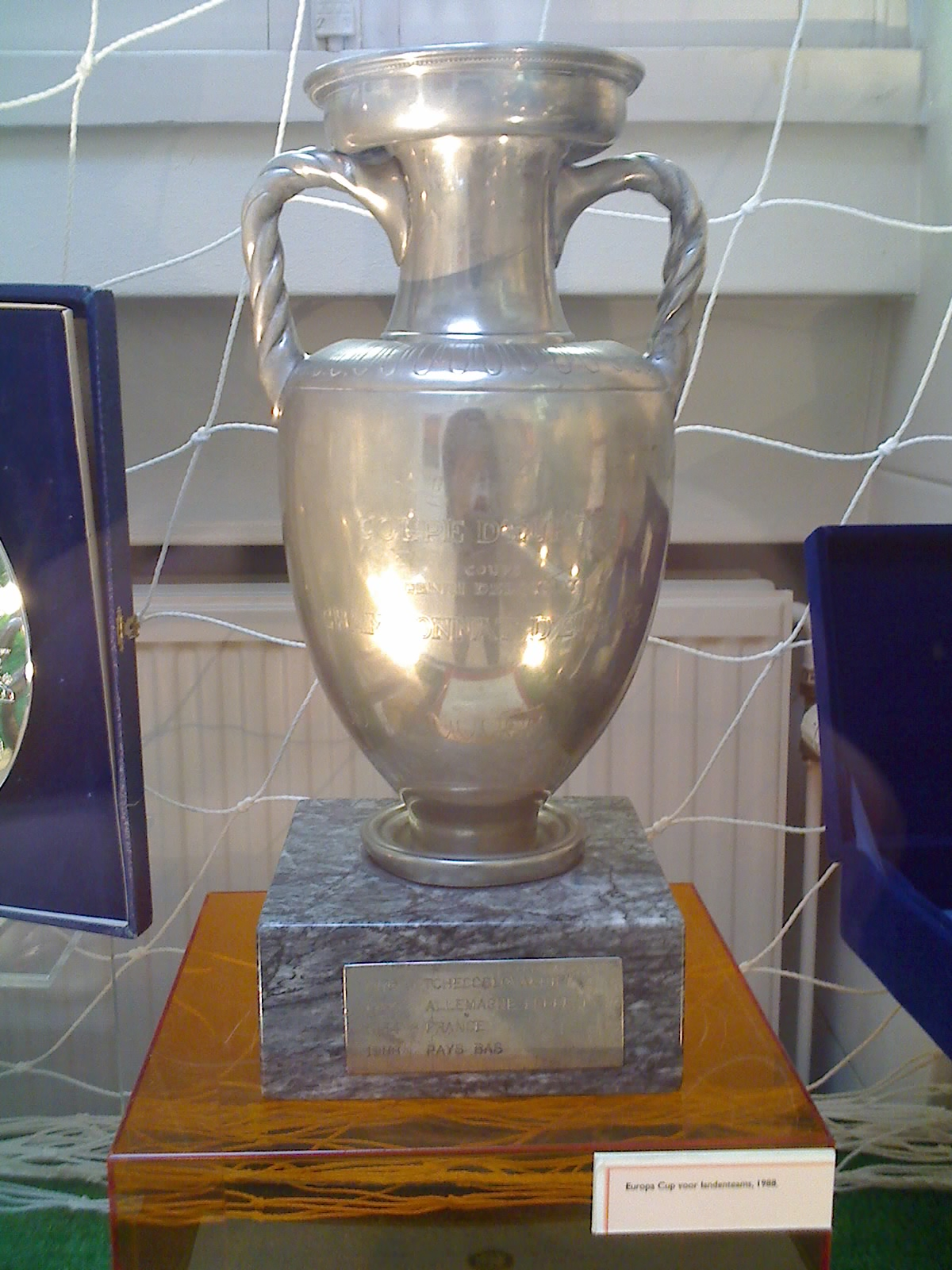
The 1988 trophy on display in Amsterdam

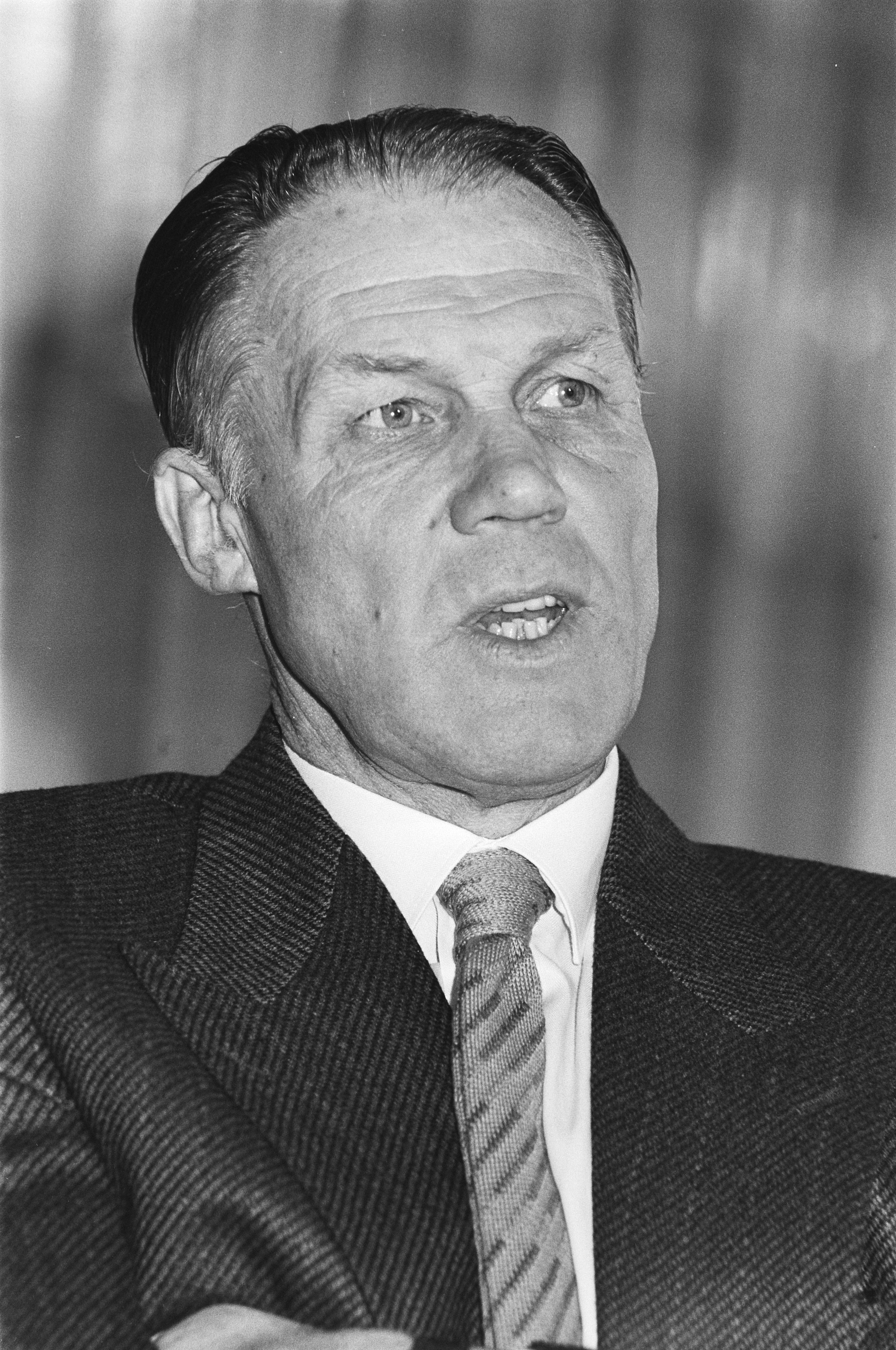
Rinus Michels

Rinus Michels returned to coach the team for the Euro '88 tournament. After losing the first group match against the Soviet Union (1–0), the Netherlands went on to qualify for the semi-final by defeating England 3–1 (with a hat-trick by the tournament's top scorer Marco van Basten), and Republic of Ireland (1–0). For many Dutch football supporters, the most important match in the tournament was the semi-final against West Germany, the host country, considered a revenge for the lost 1974 World Cup final (also in West Germany). Marco van Basten, who would later become national team coach, scored in the 89th minute of the game to sink the German side. The game is also remembered for its post-match shenanigans, including Ronald Koeman, who, in front of the German supporters, provocatively pretended to wipe his backside with the shirt of Olaf Thon as if it were toilet paper, an action Koeman later stated he regretted. The Netherlands won the final with a convincing victory over the USSR, a rematch on the round robin game, through a header by Ruud Gullit and a volley by van Basten. This was the national team's first major tournament win and it restored them to the forefront of international football for the next three years after almost a decade in the wilderness.

Despite high expectations as the team entered the 1990 World Cup, the tournament was not a success. Van Basten failed to score, as he was frequently marked by opposing defenders, while Gullit was ineffective having not fully recovered from injury. The Dutch managed to advance despite drawing all three group games, meeting their arch-rivals West Germany in the round of 16. The match is most remembered for the spitting-incident involving Frank Rijkaard and Rudi Völler as the Netherlands lost 2–1.

The team reached the semi-finals in the Euro '92, which was noted for the emergence of Dennis Bergkamp, but they were eliminated by eventual champions Denmark, with Van Basten's kick in the penalty shootout being saved by Peter Schmeichel. This was to be van Basten's last major tournament as he suffered a serious ankle injury shortly after, eventually conceding defeat and retiring at the age of 30 in 1995.

In the 1994 World Cup, in the absence of the injured van Basten and the striking Gullit, Dennis Bergkamp led the team with three goals and the Netherlands advanced to the quarter-finals, where they lost 3–2 to eventual champions Brazil.

=== 1996–2004 ===
At Euro 96, after drawing 0–0 with Scotland and beating Switzerland 2–0, they faced the hosts England in the pool A decider, with both teams on 4 points. After 62 minutes, with Scotland beating Switzerland 1–0, the Netherlands were 4–0 down and looked like finishing third behind Scotland on goal difference and going out of the tournament, but Patrick Kluivert converted a Dennis Bergkamp assist and scored in the 78th minute to see the Dutch finish second on goals scored. They then played France in the quarter-finals, drawing 0–0 and being eliminated 5–4 on penalties.

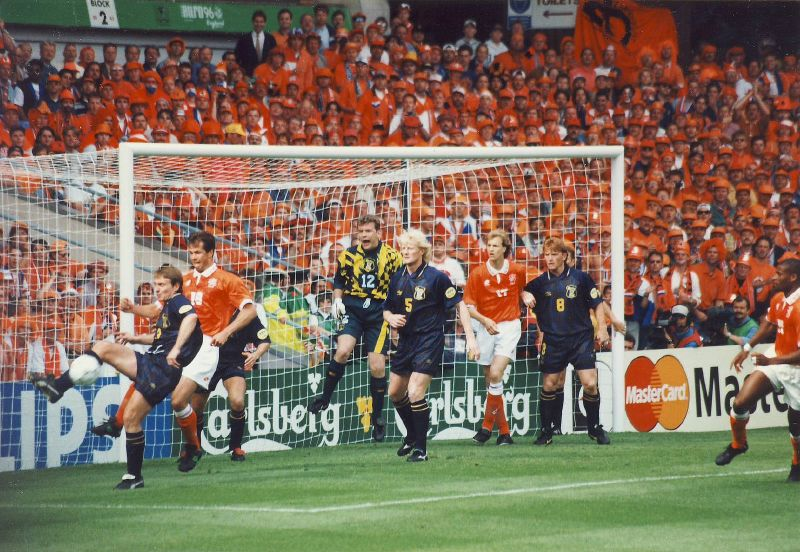
The Netherlands at Euro 96 in a match against Scotland.

In the 1998 World Cup, Netherlands, whose team included Marc Overmars, Phillip Cocu, Edgar Davids, Frank de Boer, Ronald de Boer, and Patrick Kluivert, met Argentina in the quarter-final, a rematch of the 1978 final. Near the end of regular time, after an unsuccessful dive to draw a penalty, Argentinian Ariel Ortega head-butted Edwin van der Sar. Ortega was sent off and the Netherlands won 2–1 after a Bergkamp goal in the 89th minute. Bergkamp's goal was famous because of its quality — he touched down a 60-yard (55 m) pass from Frank de Boer then reverse-flicked it inside Roberto Ayala and finally volleyed it past the Argentine goalkeeper. In the semi-final, the Netherlands took Brazil to a penalty shootout after a late Kluivert goal tied the match 1–1, but Brazil won the shootout 4–2 and advanced to the final. Netherlands lost the third place match 2–1 to upstart Croatia. Soon after the World Cup exit manager Guus Hiddink resigned after two tournaments in charge and was replaced by legendary ex-midfielder Frank Rijkaard.

Netherlands co-hosted Euro 2000 with Belgium and were one of the favourites coming into the tournament. Getting all three wins in the group stage, including a win over reigning world champions France, they then crushed Yugoslavia 6–1 in the quarter-finals, with Kluivert getting a hat-trick. In the semi-finals, their opponents, Italy, went down to ten men in the first half and the Netherlands were awarded two penalty kicks but failed to convert either chance. Italian goalkeeper Francesco Toldo made two saves in the shootout (in addition to his penalty save in regulation time) to eliminate the Netherlands. Dennis Bergkamp, who failed to score during the tournament, retired from the national team after Euro 2000 (partly due to his fear of flying effectively ruling him out from the 2002 World Cup which was to be held in East Asia.) Coach Frank Rijkaard was widely criticized by the press after the defeat to the Italians as the Dutch had squandered several chances to kill the game. Rijkaard resigned, with Louis van Gaal taking over. Van Gaal is credited with initially bringing through the backbone of this Dutch side whilst manager of Ajax during the mid nineties, including Edwin van der Sar, Edgar Davids, Michael Reiziger, Clarence Seedorf, Marc Overmars, Patrick Kluivert and the De Boer twins.

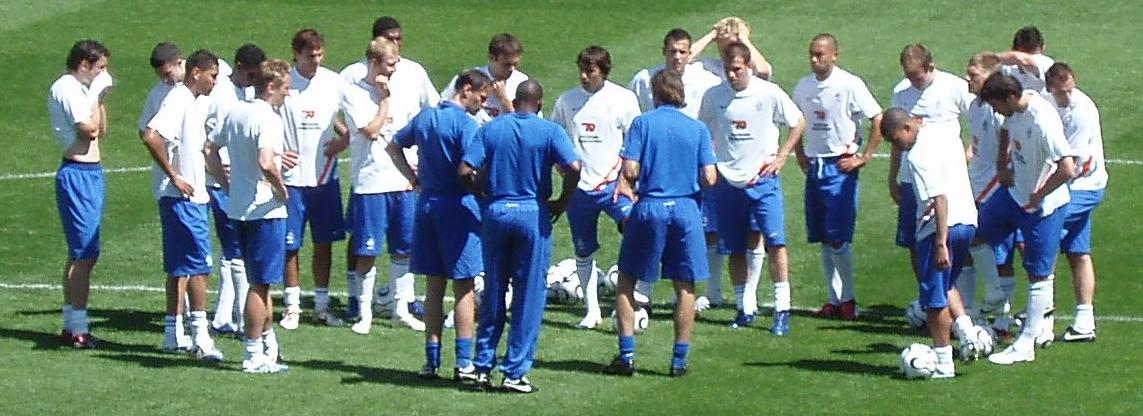
Netherlands at the 2006 World Cup

Surprisingly the Netherlands failed to qualify for the 2002 World Cup, with crucial losses to Portugal and the Republic of Ireland, the latter of which eliminated them from the Finals tournament. Van Gaal resigned at the conclusion of the Netherlands' unsuccessful campaign.

Dick Advocaat returned to coach the Netherlands for a second time and led the team to the semifinals of Euro 2004 but lost to Portugal and, after receiving criticism for his tactics and player changes, stepped down. This was to be the end for many of the team's World Cup veterans (mostly made up of the Ajax generation of 1995.) Frank and Ronald de Boer, Edgar Davids, Clarence Seedorf, Marc Overmars, Jaap Stam, and Patrick Kluivert had either retired or were not selected for the upcoming World Cup by new coach Marco van Basten.

=== 2006–2010 ===
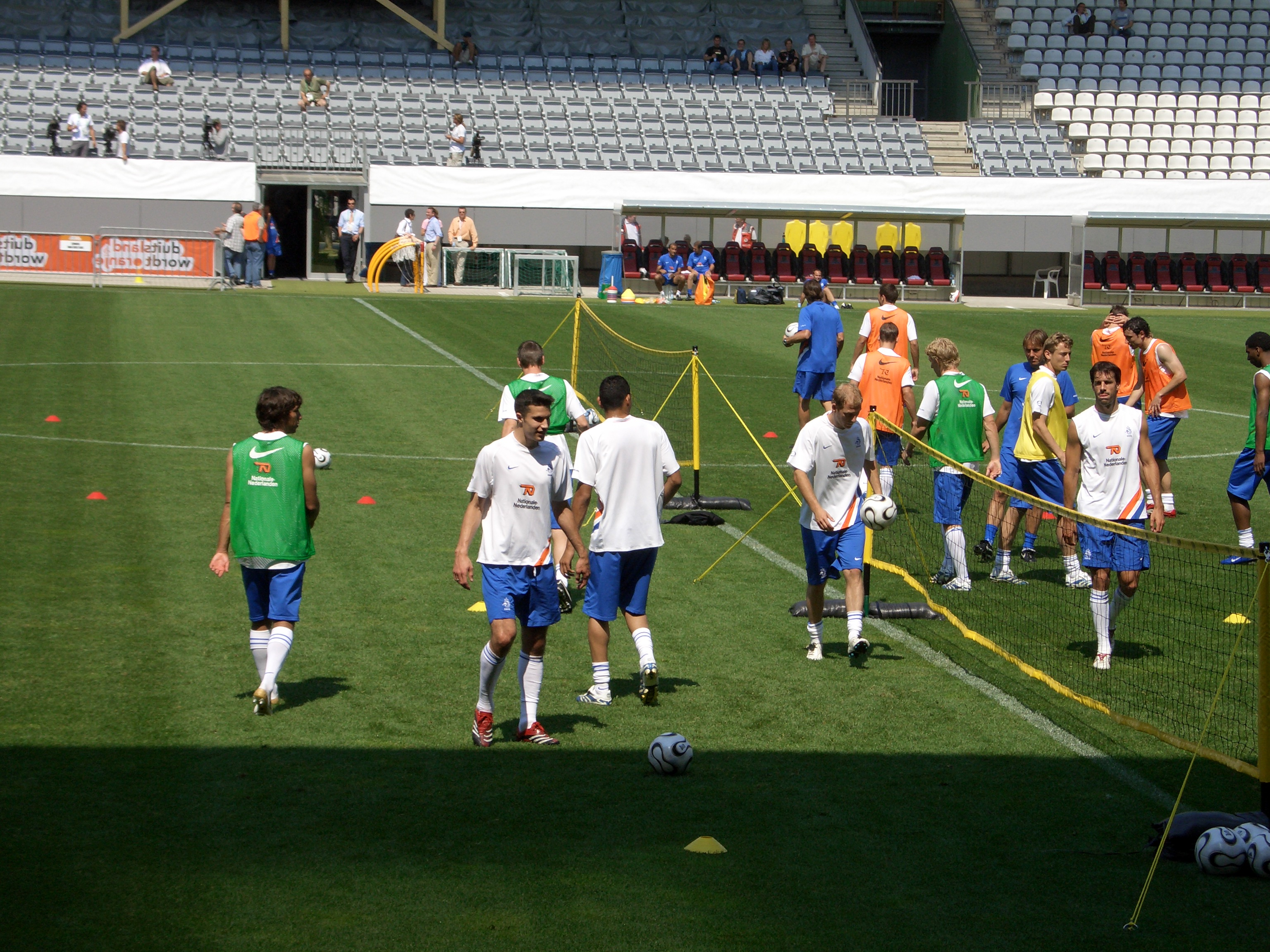
Training in Germany

The Netherlands qualified for the 2006 World Cup in Germany and finished second in Group C after beating Serbia & Montenegro (1–0) and Ivory Coast (2–1) and drawing Argentina (0–0). Both Argentina and the Netherlands finished the group stage with seven points, but the Argentinians had a superior goal difference and finished first as a result. The Dutch were eliminated in the second round after losing 1–0 to Portugal, in a match that produced 16 yellow cards (which matched the World Cup record for most cautions in one game set in 2002) and set a new World Cup record of four red cards (two for either side) and was nicknamed "the Battle of Nuremberg" by the press. Despite criticism surrounding his selection policy and the lack of attacking football from his team, Marco van Basten was offered a two-year extension to his contract by the Dutch FA, which would allow him to serve as national coach during Euro 2008 and the 2010 World Cup. The move was widely regarded as a vote of confidence in van Basten and his assistants by the KNVB officials.

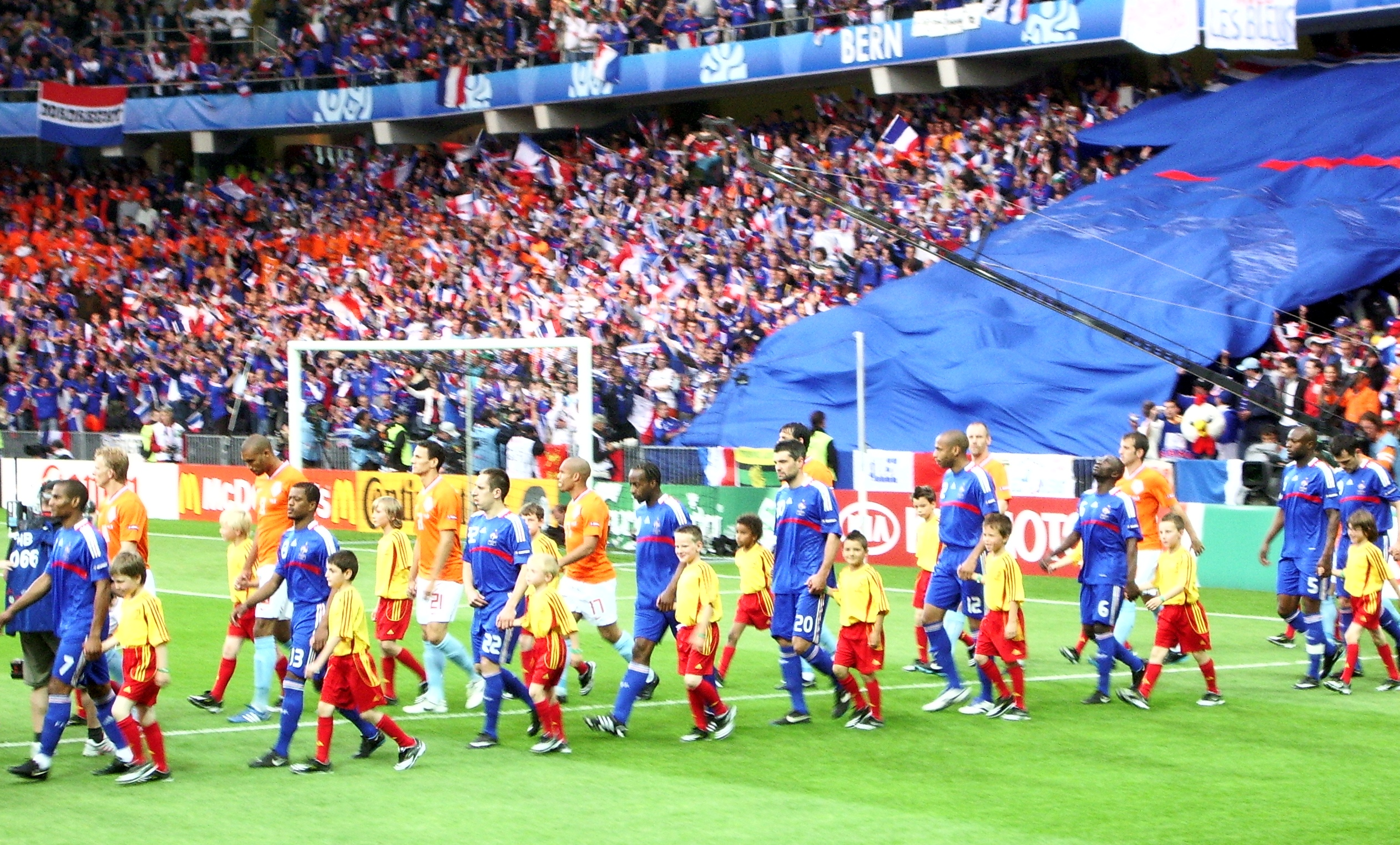
Netherlands – France at Euro 2008

The Netherlands began their Euro 2008 campaign with a win in Luxembourg on 2 September 2006. On 8 September 2007, the Oranje beat Bulgaria at the Amsterdam Arena on goals by Wesley Sneijder and Ruud van Nistelrooy. On 12 September 2007, the Netherlands won a hard-fought victory against Albania, with van Nistelrooy scoring the winning goal in stoppage time. This win took the Dutch squad into second place in Group G, on par with Romania for points, but behind on goal differential. The Oranje were beaten 1–0 in Romania on 13 October 2007, but four days later, the Netherlands' 2–0 victory over Slovenia, while rivals Bulgaria could only draw in Albania, left the Dutch needing one win from their last two games, at home to Luxembourg and away to Belarus, to qualify for Euro 2008.

The Netherlands played their first game in 2008 against Croatia in Split. The team, without Ruud van Nistelrooy, Robin van Persie, Clarence Seedorf, Orlando Engelaar and Arjen Robben, won the match 3–0. The first goal was scored by John Heitinga on a header, while Klaas-Jan Huntelaar scored the second goal on an assist from Tim de Cler. The final goal came from Celtic striker Jan Vennegoor of Hesselink. The team used a new formation under Marco van Basten, scrapping the previously used 4–3–3 formation for a 4–2–3–1.

The Dutch team was a participant in the "Group of Death," together with France, Italy, and Romania. They began Euro 2008 with a 3–0 win over World Cup Champion Italy in Bern on 9 June 2008. This was the Netherlands' first victory over Italy since 1978. In their second group match against France on 13 June 2008, the Netherlands won convincingly with a 4–1 score. The Dutch closed out an incredible group stage campaign with a 2–0 win over Romania. However, they lost in the quarter-final to former coach Guus Hiddink's Russia by 3–1, despite a late 86th-minute equalizer by Ruud van Nistelrooy.

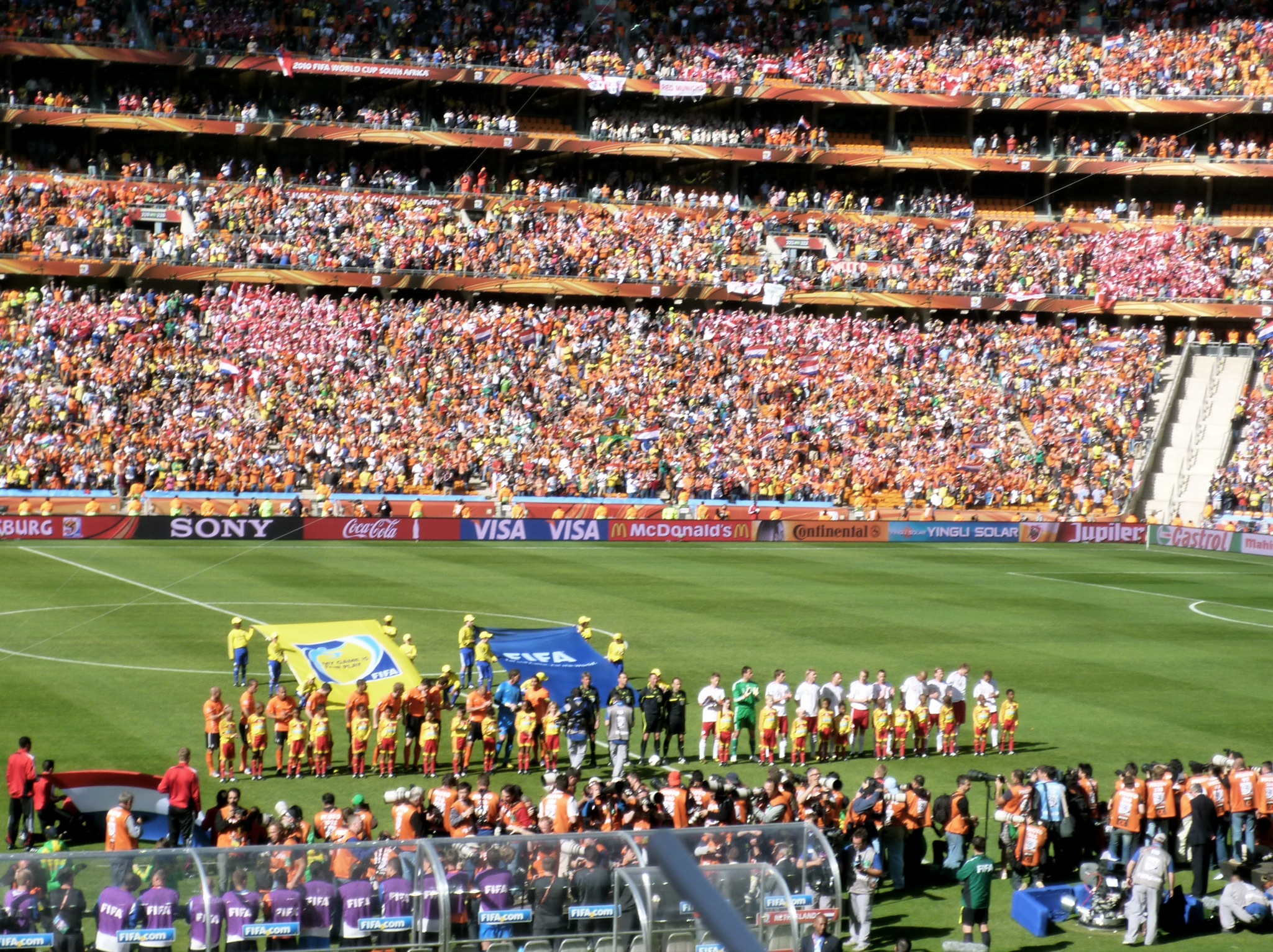
Netherlands – Denmark at the 2010 World Cup

Under new coach Bert van Marwijk, the Dutch team went on to secure a 100 percent record in their World Cup 2010 qualification campaign, winning all eight games and becoming the first European team to qualify for the World Cup. The World Cup Draw in Cape Town on the 4 December 2009 saw the Dutch being placed alongside Denmark, Cameroon and Japan in Group E. On June 14 the Dutch won 2–0 against Denmark in their opener at the World Cup. On June 19 they then beat Japan 1–0 with a goal from Wesley Sneijder. They were the first team to qualify for the Round of 16 after a 2–1 victory from Denmark over Cameroon. In the first knockout round they faced Slovakia. At the end it was 2–1 victory after goals from Arjen Robben and Wesley Sneijder. The conceded goal came in injury time from a penalty taken by Róbert Vittek. They advanced to the semifinals with a 2–1 victory over the favoured Brazilians on July 2, 2010. Brazil, who had held a 1–0 lead at the half, was the favourite to win the cup, had never lost in 37 World Cup matches (35–0–2) in which they had held a halftime lead. The first Dutch goal was originally ruled an own goal by Felipe Melo, but was later officially changed to a goal by Wesley Sneijder. The second came from a corner kick headed into the net by Wesley Sneijder despite being the shortest player on the field. In the semi-final the Dutch beat Uruguay 3–2 to advance to their first World Cup final since 1978. The Dutch hoped to cap off an undefeated run through the World Cup, but lost to Spain 1–0 after midfielder Andrés Iniesta scored in extra time. This final also became Giovanni van Bronckhorst's last match in professional football.

From August to September 2011, the team was ranked number 1 in the FIFA World Rankings, thus becoming the second national football team, after Spain, to top the rankings without previously winning a World Cup. (Spain won the World Cup in 2010.)

=== Euro 2012 ===
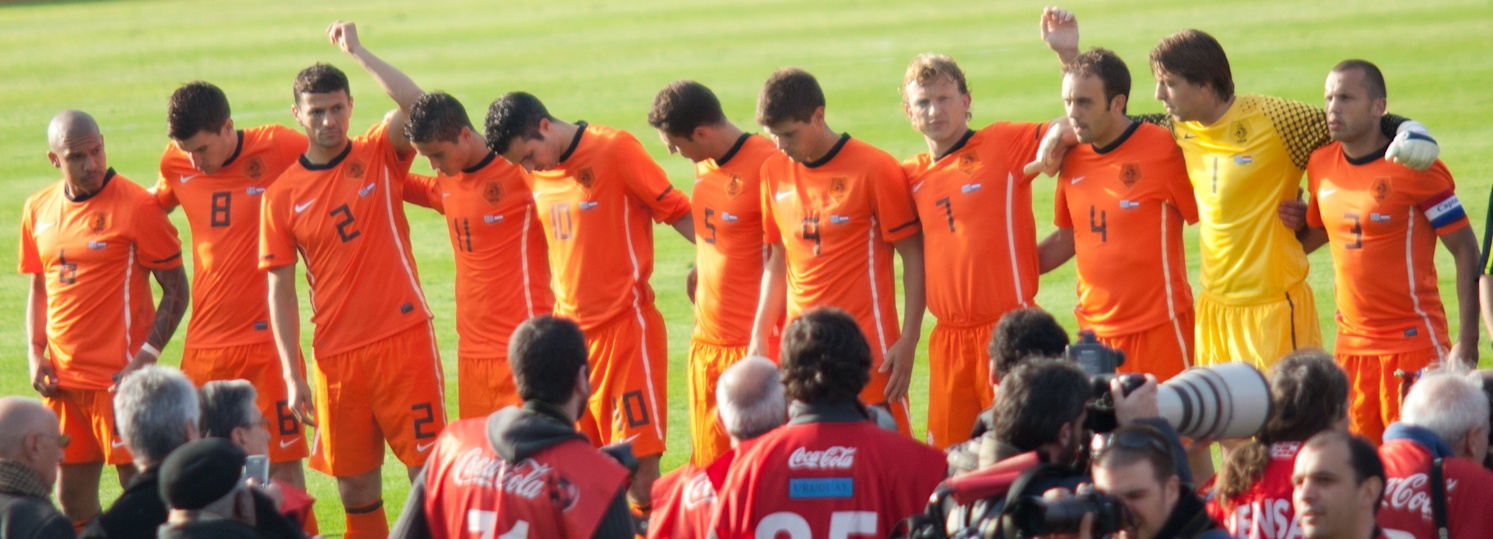
The Netherlands in 2011.

The Dutch went on after the World Cup tournament and started with the full score of 24 points from eight matches in the UEFA Euro 2012 qualifying campaign.

In between the qualification matches, the team went on a trip to South America for rematches of the World Cup quarter and semi-finals against Brazil and Uruguay. Although the matches ended in draws, coach Bert van Marwijk saw it as "a good test for his players, to prove they were fit to overcome hostile circumstances also."

The Netherlands reached the first place of the FIFA-World Ranking for the first time in August 2011, but in September they were on the second place again.

On 2 September 2011, the Netherlands defeated San Marino 11–0, their biggest victory in history.

On 6 September 2011, the Dutch defeated Finland 2–0, ensuring a place at the Euro 2012, either as Group E winner or as the best runners-ups. They later secured the top spot in the group with a 1–0 win over Moldova.

Pos	Team	Pld	W	D	L	GF	GA	GD	Pts	Qualification	(Netherlands)	(Sweden)	(Hungary)	(Finland)	(Moldova)	(San Marino)
1	Netherlands	10	9	0	1	37	8	+29	27	Qualify for final tournament	—	4–1	5–3	2–1	1–0	11–0
2	Sweden	10	8	0	2	31	11	+20	24	Qualify for final tournament	3–2	—	2–0	5–0	2–1	6–0
3	Hungary	10	6	1	3	22	14	+8	19		0–4	2–1	—	0–0	2–1	8–0
4	Finland	10	3	1	6	16	16	0	10		0–2	1–2	1–2	—	4–1	8–0
5	Moldova	10	3	0	7	12	16	−4	9		0–1	1–4	0–2	2–0	—	4–0
6	San Marino	10	0	0	10	0	53	−53	0		0–5	0–5	0–3	0–1	0–2	—

Source: UEFA
Rules for classification: Qualification tiebreakers

Finals

The draw for the final tournament took place on 2 December 2011 at the Ukraine Palace of Arts in Kyiv, Ukraine. Netherlands was placed in Group B along with Germany, Portugal, and Denmark, dubbed the tournament's "Group of Death."

On 17 June 2012, Netherlands lost to Portugal in a 2–1 defeat and exited the competition, having lost all three matches in the group. Johan Cruyff criticized the team's star players of poor build up play and sloppy execution of the easy passes.

Group B

Pos	Team	Pld	W	D	L	GF	GA	GD	Pts	Qualification
1	Germany	3	3	0	0	5	2	+3	9	Advance to knockout stage
2	Portugal	3	2	0	1	5	4	+1	6	Advance to knockout stage
3	Denmark	3	1	0	2	4	5	−1	3	
4	Netherlands	3	0	0	3	2	5	−3	0	

Source: UEFA
Rules for classification: Group stage tiebreakers
9 June 2012
19:00 UTC+3

Netherlands	0–1	Denmark
	Report	Krohn-Dehli 24'

Metalist Stadium, Kharkiv
Attendance: 35,923
Referee: Damir Skomina (Slovenia)

13 June 2012
21:45 UTC+3

Netherlands	1–2	Germany
Van Persie 73'	Report	Gómez 24', 38'

Metalist Stadium, Kharkiv
Attendance: 37,750
Referee: Jonas Eriksson (Sweden)

17 June 2012
21:45 UTC+3

Portugal	2–1	Netherlands
Ronaldo 28', 74'	Report	Van der Vaart 11'

Metalist Stadium, Kharkiv
Attendance: 37,445
Referee: Nicola Rizzoli (Italy)

=== 2014 FIFA World Cup ===
In the 2014 World Cup UEFA qualifying round, the Netherlands were placed in Group D along with Turkey, Hungary, Romania, Estonia and Andorra The Netherlands won nine games and drew one, thereby topping the group and earning automatic qualification.

Pos	Team	Pld	W	D	L	GF	GA	GD	Pts	Qualification	Netherlands national football team	Romania national football team	Hungary national football team	Turkey national football team	Estonia national football team	Andorra national football team
1	Netherlands	10	9	1	0	34	5	+29	28	Qualification to 2014 FIFA World Cup	—	4–0	8–1	2–0	3–0	3–0
2	Romania	10	6	1	3	19	12	+7	19	Advance to second round	1–4	—	3–0	0–2	2–0	4–0
3	Hungary	10	5	2	3	21	20	+1	17		1–4	2–2	—	3–1	5–1	2–0
4	Turkey	10	5	1	4	16	9	+7	16		0–2	0–1	1–1	—	3–0	5–0
5	Estonia	10	2	1	7	6	20	−14	7		2–2	0–2	0–1	0–2	—	2–0
6	Andorra	10	0	0	10	0	30	−30	0		0–2	0–4	0–5	0–2	0–1	—

== Kits ==
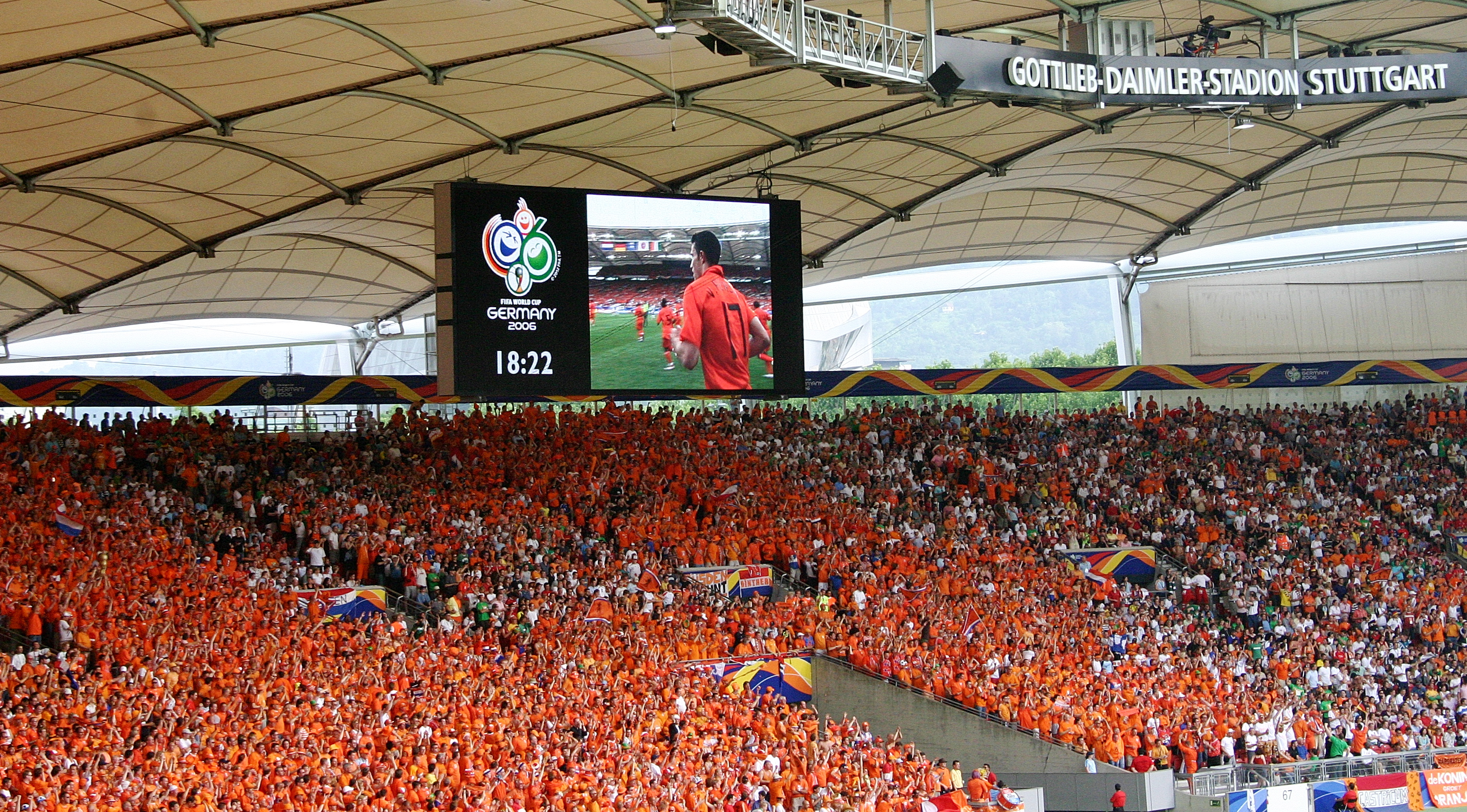
Dutch fans wearing the traditional orange colours of the national team at the 2006 FIFA World Cup

The Netherlands national football team are known for their bright orange kits with the Dutch Lion badge, supplied by Nike since 1996. Orange was the symbol of William of Orange-Nassau, the Netherlands' father of the nation and is the national colour of the country. The current Dutch away kit is white.

=== Home ===
1934	1934 World Cup	1974	1974 (alt.)	1978–80*	1978 (alt.)	1986
1988	1988 (alt.)	1990	1994	1996	1998	2000
2002	2002 (alt.)	2004	2004 (alt.)	2006	2006 (alt.)	2008
2008 (alt.)	2010	2010 (alt.)	2012	2014	2014 (alt.)	2018
2020	2022	2024	2026

=== Away ===
1978–80	1986	1990	1994	1996	1998	2000	2002	2004
2006	2008	2010	2010 (alt.)	2012	2013	2014	2018	2020
2022	2024	2026

- At UEFA Euro 1980, the kit had a piece of tape over the Adidas logos due to the prohibition of advertising on kits. This was also done by European clubs at UEFA competitions in the 1970s.

== Previous squads ==
FIFA World Cup

- 1934 FIFA World Cup squad
- 1938 FIFA World Cup squad
- 1974 FIFA World Cup squad
- 1978 FIFA World Cup squad
- 1990 FIFA World Cup squad
- 1994 FIFA World Cup squad
- 1998 FIFA World Cup squad
- 2006 FIFA World Cup squad
- 2010 FIFA World Cup squad
- 2014 FIFA World Cup squad
- 2022 FIFA World Cup squad
- 2026 FIFA World Cup squad

UEFA European Championship

- UEFA Euro 1976 squad
- UEFA Euro 1980 squad
- UEFA Euro 1988 squad
- UEFA Euro 1992 squad
- UEFA Euro 1996 squad
- UEFA Euro 2000 squad
- UEFA Euro 2004 squad
- UEFA Euro 2008 squad
- UEFA Euro 2012 squad
- UEFA Euro 2020 squad
- UEFA Euro 2024 squad

UEFA Nations League Finals

- 2019 UEFA Nations League Finals squad
- 2023 UEFA Nations League Finals squad

Olympic football tournament

- 1908 Summer Olympics squad
- 1912 Summer Olympics squad
- 1920 Summer Olympics squad
- 1924 Summer Olympics squad
- 1928 Summer Olympics squad
- 1948 Summer Olympics squad
- 1952 Summer Olympics squad
- 2008 Summer Olympics squad
