= List of international goals scored by Memphis Depay =

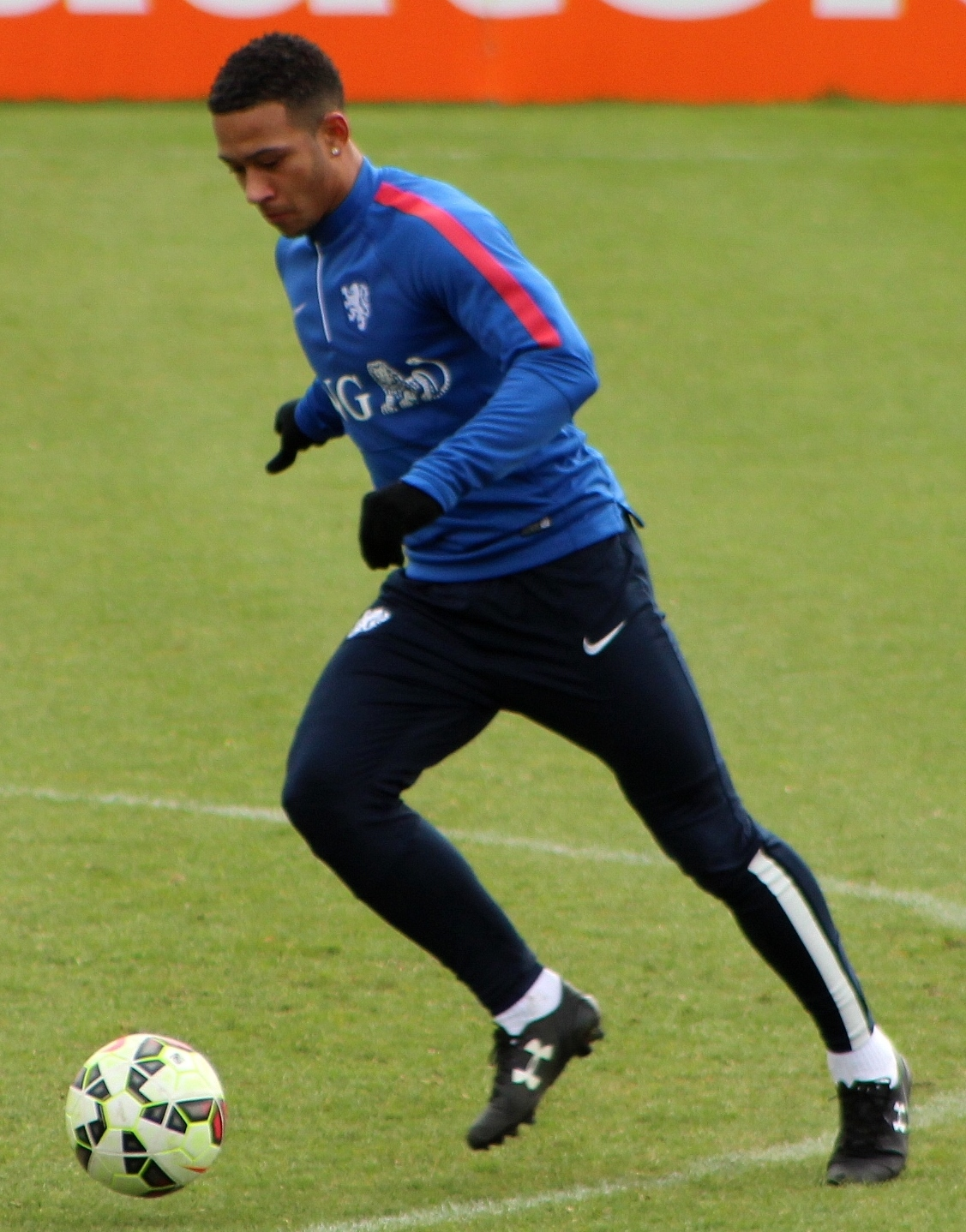
Depay during a training session with the Netherlands in March 2015

Memphis Depay is a Dutch professional footballer who has represented the Netherlands national team as a forward since 2013. As of 25 June 2026, he has scored 55 goals in 112 international appearances, making him the all-time top scorer of his country; he surpassed Robin van Persie's former record of 50 goals in 2025.

Depay made his senior debut for his country in October 2013, coming on as a substitute for Jeremain Lens in a FIFA World Cup qualifier against Turkey. On 18 June 2014, he scored his first international goal against Australia at the World Cup finals in Brazil, becoming the Netherlands' youngest ever goalscorer at the tournament at the age of 20. He then got his second goal in the competition five days later, in a 2–0 win against Chile.

Depay scored his first brace for the Netherlands in a 3–1 World Cup qualifying win over Luxembourg in November 2016. Despite only recording three goals in his first 26 caps, Depay would go on to score sixteen goals in his following 25 appearances, including eleven goals in eighteen matches under the management of Ronald Koeman in 2018 and 2019. After the Netherlands missed out on qualification for both UEFA Euro 2016 and the 2018 World Cup, Depay scored six goals during Euro 2020 qualifying to help his side reach a first major tournament for six years. In the finals tournament, Depay got on the scoresheet against both Austria and North Macedonia during the group stage.

Depay recorded his first international hat-trick in a 6–1 World Cup qualifying win over Turkey on 7 September 2021, surpassing Wesley Sneijder and equalling Johan Cruyff and Abe Lenstra in the Netherlands' top ten all-time scorers list. He then scored a further nine goals in the 2022 World Cup qualification tournament, finishing joint-top scorer of the UEFA section alongside England's Harry Kane. Depay would finish the year of 2021 with seventeen international goals in sixteen matches, breaking Patrick Kluivert's national record of twelve for most scored in a single calendar year; only five players from any UEFA country had ever surpassed this tally.

Depay scored his third World Cup goal at the 2022 tournament, coming against the United States in the round of 16. This strike saw him surpass former teammate Klaas-Jan Huntelaar as the Netherlands' second all-time top goalscorer, now trailing only Robin van Persie. At UEFA Euro 2024, Depay scored in the group game against Austria. On 10 June 2025, he equalled Van Persie's national record with his fiftieth goal, in a World Cup qualifier against Malta. Depay surpassed Van Persie with two goals in a World Cup qualifier against Lithuania on 7 September 2025.

In total, Depay has scored three goals at the FIFA World Cup, 23 during World Cup qualification, three at the UEFA European Championship, seven during European Championship qualification, and eight in the UEFA Nations League. The remainder of his goals, eleven, have come in friendlies. He has scored five goals against Gibraltar, more than against any other opponent.

== International goals ==
As of match played 14 November 2025

Scores and results list Netherlands' goal tally first, score column indicates score after each Depay goal.

Key
‡	Indicates goal was scored from a penalty kick
	Indicates Netherlands won the match
	Indicates the match ended in a draw
	Indicates Netherlands lost the match

Memphis Depay's international goals by cap, date, venue, opponent, score, result and competition
No.	Cap	Date	Venue	Opponent	Score	Result	Competition	Ref.
1	7	18 June 2014	Estádio Beira-Rio, Porto Alegre, Brazil	Australia	3–2	3–2	2014 FIFA World Cup	
2	8	23 June 2014	Arena Corinthians, São Paulo, Brazil	Chile	2–0	2–0	2014 FIFA World Cup	
3	16	5 June 2015	Amsterdam Arena, Amsterdam, Netherlands	United States	3–1	3–4	Friendly	
4	27	13 November 2016	Stade Josy Barthel, Luxembourg City, Luxembourg	Luxembourg	2–1	3–1	2018 FIFA World Cup qualification	
5	27	13 November 2016	Stade Josy Barthel, Luxembourg City, Luxembourg	Luxembourg	3–1	3–1	2018 FIFA World Cup qualification	
6	32	7 October 2017	Borisov Arena, Borisov, Belarus	Belarus	3–1	3–1	2018 FIFA World Cup qualification	
7	33	9 November 2017	Pittodrie Stadium, Aberdeen, Scotland	Scotland	1–0	1–0	Friendly	
8	34	14 November 2017	Arena Națională, Bucharest, Romania	Romania	1–0	3–0	Friendly	
9	36	26 March 2018	Stade de Genève, Geneva, Switzerland	Portugal	1–0	3–0	Friendly	
10	39	6 September 2018	Johan Cruyff Arena, Amsterdam, Netherlands	Peru	1–1	2–1	Friendly	
11	39	6 September 2018	Johan Cruyff Arena, Amsterdam, Netherlands	Peru	2–1	2–1	Friendly	
12	41	13 October 2018	Johan Cruyff Arena, Amsterdam, Netherlands	Germany	2–0	3–0	2018–19 UEFA Nations League A	
13	43	16 November 2018	De Kuip, Rotterdam, Netherlands	France	2–0‡	2–0	2018–19 UEFA Nations League A	
14	45	21 March 2019	De Kuip, Rotterdam, Netherlands	Belarus	1–0	4–0	UEFA Euro 2020 qualifying	
15	45	21 March 2019	De Kuip, Rotterdam, Netherlands	Belarus	3–0‡	4–0	UEFA Euro 2020 qualifying	
16	46	24 March 2019	Johan Cruyff Arena, Amsterdam, Netherlands	Germany	2–2	2–3	UEFA Euro 2020 qualifying	
17	50	9 September 2019	A. Le Coq Arena, Tallinn, Estonia	Estonia	3–0	4–0	UEFA Euro 2020 qualifying	
18	51	10 October 2019	De Kuip, Rotterdam, Netherlands	Northern Ireland	1–1	3–1	UEFA Euro 2020 qualifying	
19	51	10 October 2019	De Kuip, Rotterdam, Netherlands	Northern Ireland	3–1	3–1	UEFA Euro 2020 qualifying	
20	58	15 November 2020	Johan Cruyff Arena, Amsterdam, Netherlands	Bosnia and Herzegovina	3–0	3–1	2020–21 UEFA Nations League A	
21	59	18 November 2020	Silesian Stadium, Chorzów, Poland	Poland	1–1‡	2–1	2020–21 UEFA Nations League A	
22	62	30 March 2021	Victoria Stadium, Gibraltar	Gibraltar	3–0	7–0	2022 FIFA World Cup qualification	
23	62	30 March 2021	Victoria Stadium, Gibraltar	Gibraltar	7–0	7–0	2022 FIFA World Cup qualification	
24	63	2 June 2021	Estádio Algarve, Faro/Loulé, Portugal	Scotland	1–1	2–2	Friendly	
25	63	2 June 2021	Estádio Algarve, Faro/Loulé, Portugal	Scotland	2–2	2–2	Friendly	
26	64	6 June 2021	De Grolsch Veste, Enschede, Netherlands	Georgia	1–0‡	3–0	Friendly	
27	66	17 June 2021	Johan Cruyff Arena, Amsterdam, Netherlands	Austria	1–0‡	2–0	UEFA Euro 2020	
28	67	21 June 2021	Johan Cruyff Arena, Amsterdam, Netherlands	North Macedonia	1–0	3–0	UEFA Euro 2020	
29	70	4 September 2021	Philips Stadion, Eindhoven, Netherlands	Montenegro	1–0‡	4–0	2022 FIFA World Cup qualification	
30	70	4 September 2021	Philips Stadion, Eindhoven, Netherlands	Montenegro	2–0	4–0	2022 FIFA World Cup qualification	
31	71	7 September 2021	Johan Cruyff Arena, Amsterdam, Netherlands	Turkey	2–0	6–1	2022 FIFA World Cup qualification	
32	71	7 September 2021	Johan Cruyff Arena, Amsterdam, Netherlands	Turkey	3–0‡	6–1	2022 FIFA World Cup qualification	
33	71	7 September 2021	Johan Cruyff Arena, Amsterdam, Netherlands	Turkey	4–0	6–1	2022 FIFA World Cup qualification	
34	73	11 October 2021	De Kuip, Rotterdam, Netherlands	Gibraltar	2–0	6–0	2022 FIFA World Cup qualification	
35	73	11 October 2021	De Kuip, Rotterdam, Netherlands	Gibraltar	3–0‡	6–0	2022 FIFA World Cup qualification	
36	74	13 November 2021	City Stadium, Podgorica, Montenegro	Montenegro	1–0‡	2–2	2022 FIFA World Cup qualification	
37	74	13 November 2021	City Stadium, Podgorica, Montenegro	Montenegro	2–0	2–2	2022 FIFA World Cup qualification	
38	75	16 November 2021	De Kuip, Rotterdam, Netherlands	Norway	2–0	2–0	2022 FIFA World Cup qualification	
39	76	26 March 2022	Johan Cruyff Arena, Amsterdam, Netherlands	Denmark	3–1‡	4–2	Friendly	
40	78	3 June 2022	King Baudouin Stadium, Brussels, Belgium	Belgium	2–0	4–1	2022–23 UEFA Nations League A	
41	78	3 June 2022	King Baudouin Stadium, Brussels, Belgium	Belgium	4–0	4–1	2022–23 UEFA Nations League A	
42	80	14 June 2022	De Kuip, Rotterdam, Netherlands	Wales	3–2	3–2	2022–23 UEFA Nations League A	
43	85	3 December 2022	Khalifa International Stadium, Al Rayyan, Qatar	United States	1–0	3–1	2022 FIFA World Cup	
44	88	27 March 2023	De Kuip, Rotterdam, Netherlands	Gibraltar	1–0	3–0	UEFA Euro 2024 qualifying	
45	91	6 June 2024	De Kuip, Rotterdam, Netherlands	Canada	1–0	4–0	Friendly	
46	95	25 June 2024	Olympiastadion, Berlin, Germany	Austria	2–2	2–3	UEFA Euro 2024	
47	100	23 March 2025	Mestalla, Valencia, Spain	Spain	1–1‡	3–3 (a.e.t.) (4–5 p)	2024–25 UEFA Nations League A	
48	101	7 June 2025	Helsinki Olympic Stadium, Helsinki, Finland	Finland	1–0	2–0	2026 FIFA World Cup qualification	
49	102	10 June 2025	Euroborg, Groningen, Netherlands	Malta	1–0‡	8–0	2026 FIFA World Cup qualification	
50	102	10 June 2025	Euroborg, Groningen, Netherlands	Malta	2–0	8–0	2026 FIFA World Cup qualification	
51	104	7 September 2025	Darius and Girėnas Stadium, Kaunas, Lithuania	Lithuania	1–0	3–2	2026 FIFA World Cup qualification	
52	104	7 September 2025	Darius and Girėnas Stadium, Kaunas, Lithuania	Lithuania	3–2	3–2	2026 FIFA World Cup qualification	
53	105	9 October 2025	National Stadium, Ta' Qali, Malta	Malta	4–0	4–0	2026 FIFA World Cup qualification	
54	106	12 October 2025	Johan Cruyff Arena, Amsterdam, Netherlands	Finland	3–0‡	4–0	2026 FIFA World Cup qualification	
55	107	14 November 2025	Stadion Narodowy, Warsaw, Poland	Poland	1–1	1–1	2026 FIFA World Cup qualification	

== Hat-tricks ==
No.	Date	Venue	Opponent	Goals	Result	Competition	Ref.
1	7 September 2021	Johan Cruyff Arena, Amsterdam, Netherlands	Turkey	3 (16', 38' pen., 54')	6–1	2022 FIFA World Cup qualification	

== Statistics ==
As of match played 25 June 2026

Appearances and goals by year
Year	Apps	Goals
2013	3	0
2014	10	2
2015	8	1
2016	6	2
2017	7	3
2018	10	5
2019	8	6
2020	7	2
2021	16	17
2022	11	5
2023	2	1
2024	10	2
2025	10	9
2026	4	0
Total	112	55

Appearances and goals by competition
Competition	Apps	Goals
FIFA World Cup finals	12	3
FIFA World Cup qualification	23	23
UEFA European Championship finals	10	3
UEFA European Championship qualifying	16	7
UEFA Nations League	17	8
Friendlies	34	11
Total	112	55

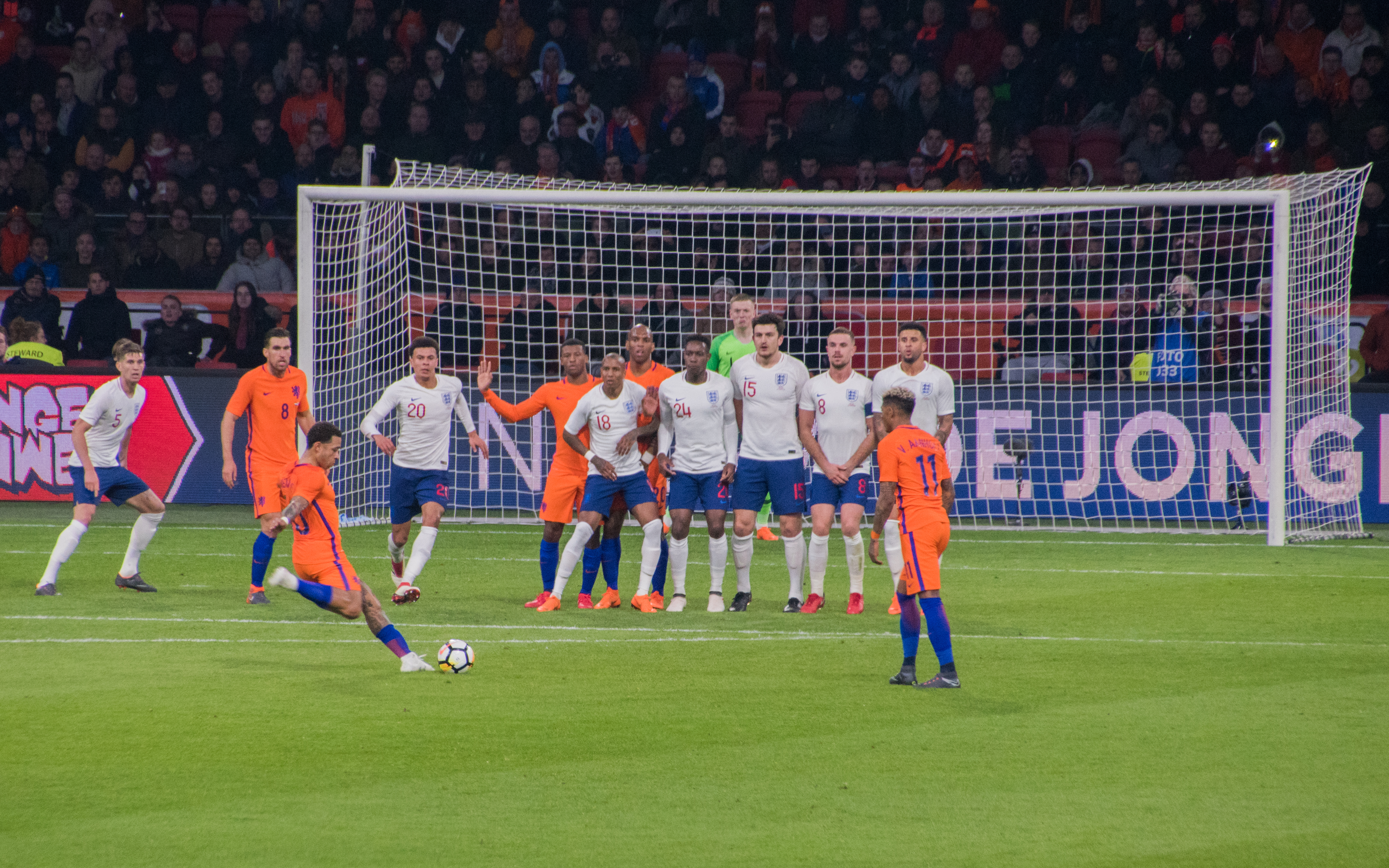
Depay taking a free kick in a friendly against England in March 2018.

Goals by opponent
Opponent	Goals
Gibraltar	5
Montenegro	4
Belarus	3
Malta	3
Scotland	3
Turkey	3
Austria	2
Belgium	2
Finland	2
Germany	2
Lithuania	2
Luxembourg	2
Northern Ireland	2
Peru	2
Poland	2
United States	2
Australia	1
Bosnia and Herzegovina	1
Canada	1
Chile	1
Denmark	1
Estonia	1
France	1
Georgia	1
North Macedonia	1
Norway	1
Portugal	1
Romania	1
Spain	1
Wales	1
Total	55

Appearances and goals by manager
Manager	Apps	Goals
Ronald Koeman	43	23
Louis van Gaal	29	17
Frank de Boer	14	9
Dick Advocaat	4	3
Danny Blind	10	2
Guus Hiddink	7	1
Fred Grim	3	0
Dwight Lodeweges	2	0
Total	112	55

Appearances and goals by club
Club	Apps	Goals
(France) Lyon	41	23
(Spain) Barcelona	18	15
(Brazil) Corinthians	14	9
(Netherlands) PSV Eindhoven	17	3
(Spain) Atlético Madrid	12	3
(England) Manchester United	10	2
Total	112	55

== See also ==
- List of top international men's football goal scorers by country
- List of men's footballers with 50 or more international goals
- List of men's footballers with 100 or more international caps
