= Beb Bakhuys =

Dutch footballer and manager

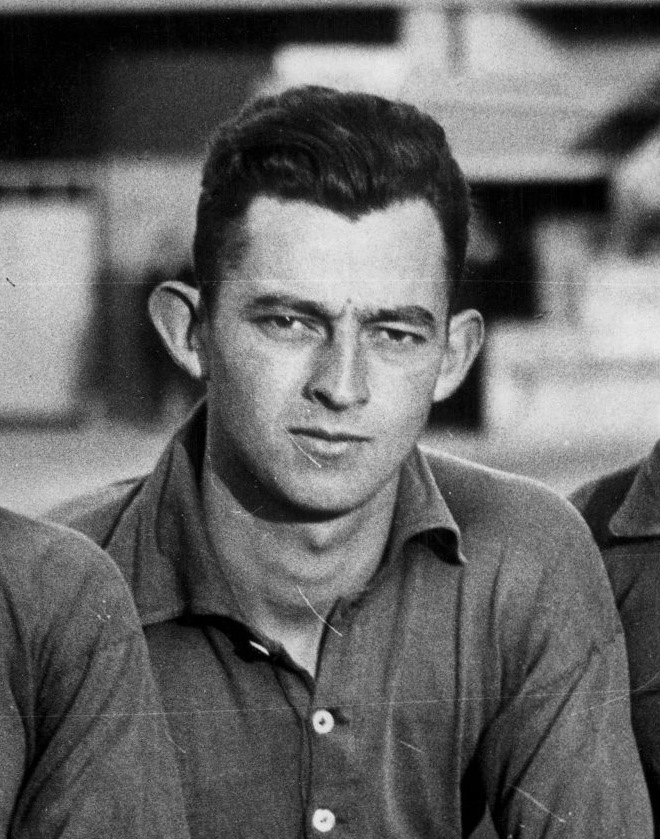
- Beb Bakhuys in 1935

Personal information
- Full name: Elisa Hendrik Bakhuys
- Date of birth: 16 April 1909
- Place of birth: Pekalongan, Dutch East Indies
- Date of death: 7 July 1982 (aged 73)
- Place of death: The Hague, Netherlands
- Height: 1.81 m (5 ft 11 1/2 in)
- Position: Striker

Senior career*
Years	Team	Apps	(Gls)
1925–1926	HBS	9	(6)
1926–1930	ZAC		
1930–1933	THOR		
1933–1935	ZAC		
1935–1937	HBS		
1937	VVV	0	(0)
1937–1939	Metz	17	(9)
1945–1946	Metz	16	(5)

International career
1928–1937	Netherlands	23	(28)

Managerial career
- 1945–1946: Metz
- * Club domestic league appearances and goals

Elisa Hendrik "Beb" Bakhuys (16 April 1909 – 7 July 1982) was a Dutch football player and manager.

== Club career ==
Bakhuys made his senior debut for HBS on 27 September 1925 against Haarlem and scored 36 goals in 44 matches for them. He joined Zwolsche AC and had a spell with THOR in his native Dutch East Indies while working for the Bataafsche Petroleum Maatschappij in Surabaya. He returned to ZAC and later HBS. In 1937 he controversially moved to VVV.

He became the second Dutch player to play outside of the country when he signed as a professional for FC Metz in 1937, in a move which ended his international career. The first Dutch national to play abroad was goalkeeper Gerrit Keizer. Bakhuys was famous for his diving headers. During the Second World War he was forced to work in Leipzig. Throughout his both spells at ZAC, Bakhuys scored 147 goals, in 99 games.

== International career ==
Bakhuys scored 28 goals in 23 games for the Dutch national side. He represented the Netherlands at the 1934 FIFA World Cup,

== Honours ==
SVB (Soerabajasche Voetbalbond)

- Dutch East Indies Championship: 1930
