= List of international goals scored by Robin van Persie =

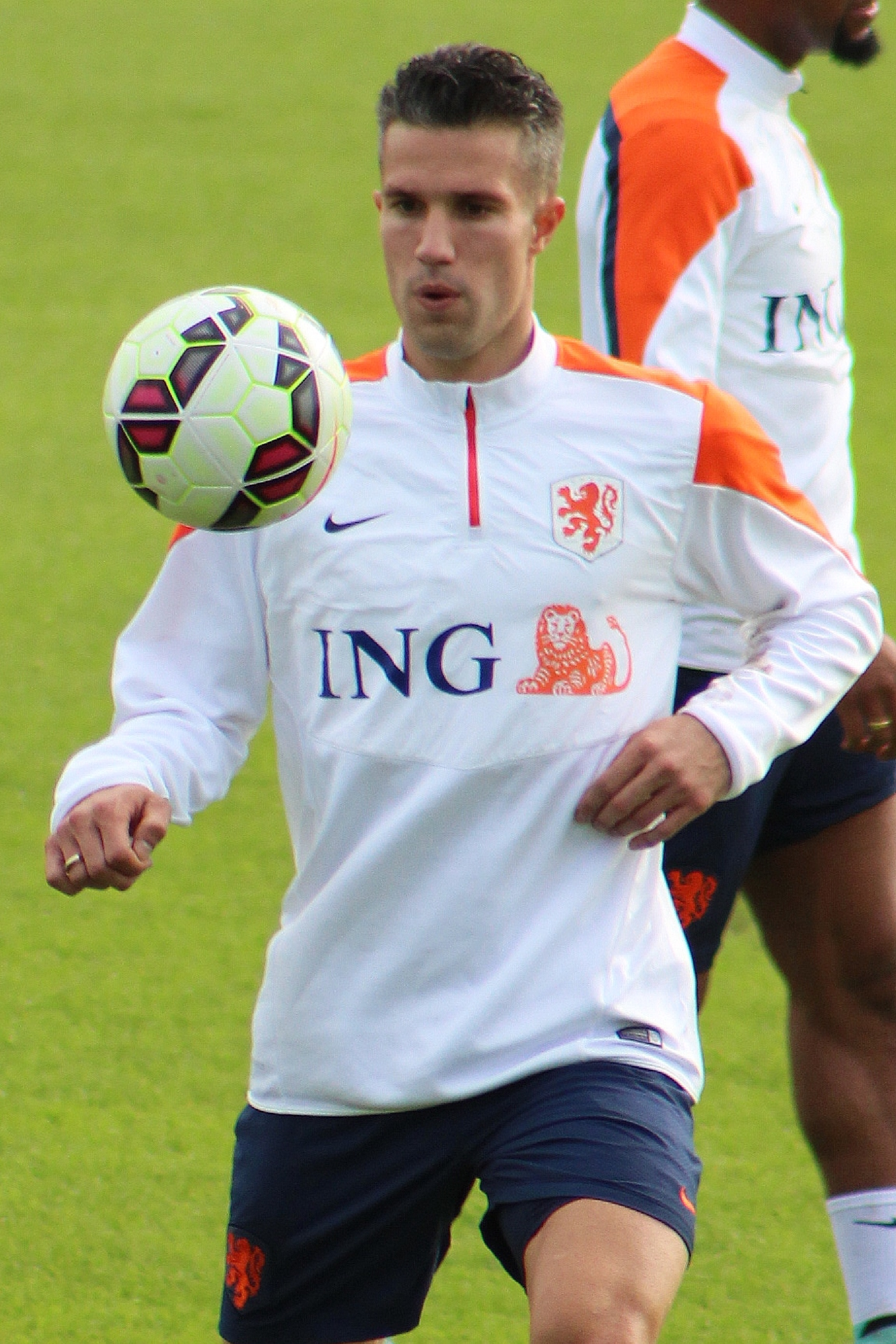
Van Persie in 2014

Robin van Persie is a Dutch retired professional footballer who played for the Netherlands national team as a striker. He made his debut for the Netherlands in June 2005, coming on as a substitute for Ruud van Nistelrooy in a 2–0 victory over Romania. His first international goal came in his next appearance for the Netherlands, scoring the final goal in a 4–0 win against Finland in Helsinki during the qualification campaign for the 2006 FIFA World Cup. With 50 goals in 102 appearances, Van Persie was formerly the Netherlands' all-time top scorer, until being overtaken by Memphis Depay in 2025. He became the country's leading scorer in 2013, when he surpassed former leader Patrick Kluivert's tally of 40 goals. Van Persie made his 102nd and final appearance for the Netherlands in August 2017.

Van Persie scored two hat-tricks during his international career. In September 2011, he scored four goals in an 11–0 victory against San Marino in a UEFA Euro 2012 qualifying match. He also scored three goals in a 2014 FIFA World Cup qualifier in an 8–1 win against Hungary in October 2013. He also scored twice in a single match on seven occasions. Van Persie scored more goals against Hungary (six) than any other nation. Twenty of his goals were scored in the Amsterdam Arena.

Van Persie scored more goals in friendlies than in any other format, with fifteen. He scored thirteen goals in qualifying for both the FIFA World Cup and UEFA European Championship, six in FIFA World Cup finals, and three in the UEFA Euro finals.

== International goals ==
Scores and results list the Netherlands' goal tally first.

Key
‡	Indicates goal was scored from a penalty kick

No.	Cap	Date	Venue	Opponent	Score	Result	Competition	Ref.
1	2	8 June 2005	Olympic Stadium, Helsinki, Finland	Finland	4–0	4–0	2006 FIFA World Cup qualification	
2	12	16 June 2006	Neckarstadion, Stuttgart, Germany	Ivory Coast	1–0	2–1	2006 FIFA World Cup	
3	15	16 August 2006	Lansdowne Road, Dublin, Ireland	(Republic of Ireland) Ireland	4–0	4–0	Friendly	
4	17	6 September 2006	Philips Stadion, Eindhoven, Netherlands	Belarus	1–0	3–0	UEFA Euro 2008 qualification	
5	17	6 September 2006	Philips Stadion, Eindhoven, Netherlands	Belarus	2–0	3–0	UEFA Euro 2008 qualification	
6	18	7 October 2006	Vasil Levski National Stadium, Sofia, Bulgaria	Bulgaria	1–1	1–1	UEFA Euro 2008 qualification	
7	19	11 October 2006	Amsterdam Arena, Amsterdam, Netherlands	Albania	1–0	2–1	UEFA Euro 2008 qualification	
8	26	13 June 2008	Stade de Suisse, Bern, Switzerland	France	2–0	4–1	UEFA Euro 2008	
9	27	17 June 2008	Stade de Suisse, Bern, Switzerland	Romania	2–0	2–0	UEFA Euro 2008	
10	29	20 August 2008	Lokomotiv Stadium, Moscow, Russia	Russia	1–0	1–1	Friendly	
11	33	19 November 2008	Amsterdam Arena, Amsterdam, Netherlands	Sweden	1–0	3–1	Friendly	
12	33	19 November 2008	Amsterdam Arena, Amsterdam, Netherlands	Sweden	3–1	3–1	Friendly	
13	35	28 March 2009	Amsterdam Arena, Amsterdam, Netherlands	Scotland	2–0	3–0	2010 FIFA World Cup qualification	
14	39	5 September 2009	De Grolsch Veste, Enschede, Netherlands	Japan	1–0	3–0	Friendly	
15	42	26 May 2010	Badenova-Stadion, Freiburg, Germany	Mexico	1–0	2–1	Friendly	
16	42	26 May 2010	Badenova-Stadion, Freiburg, Germany	Mexico	2–0	2–1	Friendly	
17	43	1 June 2010	De Kuip, Rotterdam, Netherlands	Ghana	4–1‡	4–1	Friendly	
18	44	5 June 2010	Amsterdam Arena, Amsterdam, Netherlands	Hungary	1–1	6–1	Friendly	
19	47	24 June 2010	Cape Town Stadium, Cape Town, South Africa	Cameroon	1–0	2–1	2010 FIFA World Cup	
20	53	25 March 2011	Ferenc Puskás Stadium, Budapest, Hungary	Hungary	4–0	4–0	UEFA Euro 2012 qualification	
21	54	29 March 2011	Amsterdam Arena, Amsterdam, Netherlands	Hungary	1–0	5–3	UEFA Euro 2012 qualification	
22	57	2 September 2011	Philips Stadion, Eindhoven, Netherlands	San Marino	1–0	11–0	UEFA Euro 2012 qualification	
23	57	2 September 2011	Philips Stadion, Eindhoven, Netherlands	San Marino	6–0	11–0	UEFA Euro 2012 qualification	
24	57	2 September 2011	Philips Stadion, Eindhoven, Netherlands	San Marino	7–0	11–0	UEFA Euro 2012 qualification	
25	57	2 September 2011	Philips Stadion, Eindhoven, Netherlands	San Marino	9–0	11–0	UEFA Euro 2012 qualification	
26	63	26 May 2012	Amsterdam Arena, Amsterdam, Netherlands	Bulgaria	1–0	1–2	Friendly	
27	65	2 June 2012	Amsterdam Arena, Amsterdam, Netherlands	Northern Ireland	1–0	6–0	Friendly	
28	65	2 June 2012	Amsterdam Arena, Amsterdam, Netherlands	Northern Ireland	3–0‡	6–0	Friendly	
29	67	13 June 2012	Metalist Stadium, Kharkiv, Ukraine	Germany	1–2	1–2	UEFA Euro 2012	
30	69	7 September 2012	Amsterdam Arena, Amsterdam, Netherlands	Turkey	1–0	2–0	2014 FIFA World Cup qualification	
31	71	16 October 2012	Arena Națională, Bucharest, Romania	Romania	4–1	4–1	2014 FIFA World Cup qualification	
32	73	22 March 2013	Amsterdam Arena, Amsterdam, Netherlands	Estonia	2–0	3–0	2014 FIFA World Cup qualification	
33	74	26 March 2013	Amsterdam Arena, Amsterdam, Netherlands	Romania	2–0	4–0	2014 FIFA World Cup qualification	
34	74	26 March 2013	Amsterdam Arena, Amsterdam, Netherlands	Romania	3–0‡	4–0	2014 FIFA World Cup qualification	
35	76	11 June 2013	Workers' Stadium, Beijing, China	China	1–0‡	2–0	Friendly	
36	78	6 September 2013	A. Le Coq Arena, Tallinn, Estonia	Estonia	2–2‡	2–2	2014 FIFA World Cup qualification	
37	79	10 September 2013	Estadi Comunal, Andorra la Vella, Andorra	Andorra	1–0	2–0	2014 FIFA World Cup qualification	
38	79	10 September 2013	Estadi Comunal, Andorra la Vella, Andorra	Andorra	2–0	2–0	2014 FIFA World Cup qualification	
39	80	11 October 2013	Amsterdam Arena, Amsterdam, Netherlands	Hungary	1–0	8–1	2014 FIFA World Cup qualification	
40	80	11 October 2013	Amsterdam Arena, Amsterdam, Netherlands	Hungary	4–0	8–1	2014 FIFA World Cup qualification	
41	80	11 October 2013	Amsterdam Arena, Amsterdam, Netherlands	Hungary	5–1	8–1	2014 FIFA World Cup qualification	
42	83	17 May 2014	Amsterdam Arena, Amsterdam, Netherlands	Ecuador	1–1	1–1	Friendly	
43	84	31 May 2014	De Kuip, Rotterdam, Netherlands	Ghana	1–0	1–0	Friendly	
44	86	13 June 2014	Arena Fonte Nova, Salvador, Brazil	Spain	1–1	5–1	2014 FIFA World Cup	
45	86	13 June 2014	Arena Fonte Nova, Salvador, Brazil	Spain	4–1	5–1	2014 FIFA World Cup	
46	87	18 June 2014	Estádio Beira-Rio, Porto Alegre, Brazil	Australia	2–2	3–2	2014 FIFA World Cup	
47	91	12 July 2014	Estádio Nacional, Brasília, Brazil	Brazil	1–0‡	3–0	2014 FIFA World Cup	
48	94	10 October 2014	Amsterdam Arena, Amsterdam, Netherlands	Kazakhstan	3–1‡	3–1	UEFA Euro 2016 qualification	
49	96	16 November 2014	Amsterdam Arena, Amsterdam, Netherlands	Latvia	1–0	6–0	UEFA Euro 2016 qualification	
50	101	13 October 2015	Amsterdam Arena, Amsterdam, Netherlands	Czech Republic	2–3	2–3	UEFA Euro 2016 qualification	

== Hat-tricks ==
No.	Date	Venue	Opponent	Goals	Result	Competition	Ref.
1	2 September 2011	Philips Stadion, Eindhoven, Netherlands	San Marino	4 – (7', 65', 67', 79')	11–0	UEFA Euro 2012 qualification	
2	11 October 2013	Amsterdam Arena, Amsterdam, Netherlands	Hungary	3 – (16', 44', 53')	8–1	2014 FIFA World Cup qualification	

== Quat-tricks ==
No.	Date	Venue	Opponent	Goals	Result	Competition	Ref.
1	2 September 2011	Philips Stadion, Eindhoven, Netherlands	San Marino	4 – (7', 65', 67', 79')	11–0	UEFA Euro 2012 qualification	

== Statistics ==
Goals by year
Year	Apps	Goals
2005	7	1
2006	12	6
2007	4	0
2008	9	5
2009	8	2
2010	11	5
2011	9	6
2012	10	7
2013	10	10
2014	15	8
2015	5	1
2016	0	0
2017	1	0
Total	102	50

Goals by competition
Competition	Goals
Friendlies	15
FIFA World Cup qualifiers	13
UEFA European Championship qualifiers	13
FIFA World Cup finals	6
UEFA European Championship finals	3
Total	50

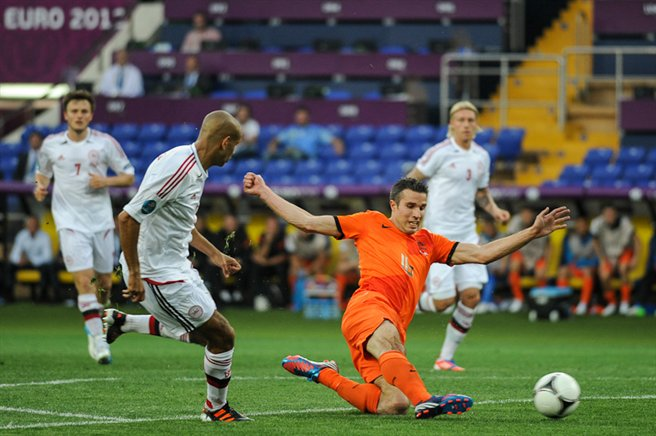
Van Persie attempting a shot against Denmark at UEFA Euro 2012
