= 2022 FIFA World Cup qualification – UEFA Group C =

The 2022 FIFA World Cup qualification UEFA Group C was one of the ten UEFA groups in the World Cup qualification tournament to decide which teams would qualify for the 2022 FIFA World Cup finals tournament in Qatar. Group C consisted of five teams: Bulgaria, Italy, Lithuania, Northern Ireland and Switzerland. The teams played against each other home-and-away in a round-robin format.

The group winners, Switzerland, qualified directly for the World Cup finals, while the runners-up, Italy, advanced to the second round (play-offs).

== Standings ==
| Pos | Team | Pld | W | D | L | GF | GA | GD | Pts | Qualification | Switzerland | Italy | | Bulgaria | Lithuania |
|---|---|---|---|---|---|---|---|---|---|---|---|---|---|---|---|
| 1 | Switzerland | 8 | 5 | 3 | 0 | 15 | 2 | +13 | 18 | Qualification for 2022 FIFA World Cup | — | 0–0 | 2–0 | 4–0 | 1–0 |
| 2 | Italy | 8 | 4 | 4 | 0 | 13 | 2 | +11 | 16 | Advance to play-offs | 1–1 | — | 2–0 | 1–1 | 5–0 |
| 3 | Northern Ireland | 8 | 2 | 3 | 3 | 6 | 7 | −1 | 9 | | 0–0 | 0–0 | — | 0–0 | 1–0 |
| 4 | Bulgaria | 8 | 2 | 2 | 4 | 6 | 14 | −8 | 8 | | 1–3 | 0–2 | 2–1 | — | 1–0 |
| 5 | Lithuania | 8 | 1 | 0 | 7 | 4 | 19 | −15 | 3 | | 0–4 | 0–2 | 1–4 | 3–1 | — |

Source: FIFA, UEFA
Rules for classification: Tiebreakers

== Matches ==
The fixture list was confirmed by UEFA on 8 December 2020, the day following the draw. Times are CET/CEST, (Note: CET (UTC+1) for matches until 27 March and from 31 October (matchday 1 and 9–10), and CEST (UTC+2) for matches from 28 March to 30 October 2021 (matchday 2–8).) as listed by UEFA (local times, if different, are in parentheses).

25 March 2021
18:00 (19:00 UTC+2)

| Bulgaria | 1–3 | Switzerland |
|---|---|---|
| Despodov 46' | Report (FIFA); Report (UEFA) | Embolo 7'; Seferovic 10'; Zuber 13' |

Vasil Levski National Stadium, Sofia
Attendance: 0 (Note: Due to the COVID-19 pandemic in Europe, the match was played behind closed doors.)
Referee: Nikola Dabanović (Montenegro)
25 March 2021
20:45

| Italy | 2–0 | Northern Ireland |
|---|---|---|
| Berardi 14'; Immobile 39' | Report (FIFA); Report (UEFA) |

Stadio Ennio Tardini, Parma
Attendance: 0
Referee: Ali Palabıyık (Turkey)

28 March 2021
20:45 (21:45 UTC+3)

| Bulgaria | 0–2 | Italy |
|---|---|---|
| | Report (FIFA); Report (UEFA) | Belotti 43' (pen.); Locatelli 83' |

Vasil Levski National Stadium, Sofia
Attendance: 0
Referee: Slavko Vinčić (Slovenia)
28 March 2021
21:00 (Note: The Switzerland vs Lithuania match, originally to be played at 20:45 UTC+2, was delayed by 15 minutes to replace a wrong-sized goal.)

| Switzerland | 1–0 | Lithuania |
|---|---|---|
| Shaqiri 2' | Report (FIFA); Report (UEFA) |

Kybunpark, St. Gallen
Attendance: 0
Referee: Mattias Gestranius (Finland)

31 March 2021
20:45 (21:45 UTC+3)

| Lithuania | 0–2 | Italy |
|---|---|---|
| | Report (FIFA); Report (UEFA) | Sensi 48'; Immobile 90+4' (pen.) |

LFF Stadium, Vilnius
Attendance: 0
Referee: Paweł Raczkowski (Poland)
31 March 2021
20:45 (19:45 UTC+1)

| Northern Ireland | 0–0 | Bulgaria |
|---|---|---|
| | Report (FIFA); Report (UEFA) |

Windsor Park, Belfast
Attendance: 0
Referee: Yigal Frid (Israel)

2 September 2021
20:45

| Italy | 1–1 | Bulgaria |
|---|---|---|
| Chiesa 16' | Report (FIFA); Report (UEFA) | A. Iliev 39' |

Stadio Artemio Franchi, Florence
Attendance: 14,366
Referee: Serdar Gözübüyük (Netherlands)
2 September 2021
20:45 (21:45 UTC+3)

| Lithuania | 1–4 | Northern Ireland |
|---|---|---|
| Baravykas 55' | Report (FIFA); Report (UEFA) | Ballard 20'; Washington 52' (pen.); Lavery 67'; McNair 82' (pen.) |

LFF Stadium, Vilnius
Attendance: 1,612
Referee: Stéphanie Frappart (France)

5 September 2021
18:00 (19:00 UTC+3)

| Bulgaria | 1–0 | Lithuania |
|---|---|---|
| Chochev 82' | Report (FIFA); Report (UEFA) |

Vasil Levski National Stadium, Sofia
Attendance: 2,503
Referee: John Beaton (Scotland)
5 September 2021
20:45

| Switzerland | 0–0 | Italy |
|---|---|---|
| | Report (FIFA); Report (UEFA) |

St. Jakob-Park, Basel
Attendance: 31,500
Referee: Carlos del Cerro Grande (Spain)

8 September 2021
20:45

| Italy | 5–0 | Lithuania |
|---|---|---|
| Kean 11', 29'; Utkus 14' (o.g.); Raspadori 24'; Di Lorenzo 54' | Report (FIFA); Report (UEFA) |

Stadio Città del Tricolore, Reggio Emilia
Attendance: 10,578
Referee: Craig Pawson (England)
8 September 2021
20:45 (19:45 UTC+1)

| Northern Ireland | 0–0 | Switzerland |
|---|---|---|
| | Report (FIFA); Report (UEFA) |

Windsor Park, Belfast
Attendance: 15,660
Referee: Harald Lechner (Austria)

9 October 2021
15:00 (16:00 UTC+3)

| Lithuania | 3–1 | Bulgaria |
|---|---|---|
| Lasickas 18'; Černych 82', 84' | Report (FIFA); Report (UEFA) | Despodov 64' |

LFF Stadium, Vilnius
Attendance: 2,526
Referee: Yevhen Aranovskyi (Ukraine)
9 October 2021
20:45

| Switzerland | 2–0 | Northern Ireland |
|---|---|---|
| Zuber 45+3'; Fassnacht 90+1' | Report (FIFA); Report (UEFA) |

Stade de Genève, Geneva
Attendance: 19,129
Referee: Slavko Vinčić (Slovenia)

12 October 2021
20:45 (21:45 UTC+3)

| Bulgaria | 2–1 | Northern Ireland |
|---|---|---|
| Nedelev 53', 63' | Report (FIFA); Report (UEFA) | Washington 37' |

Vasil Levski National Stadium, Sofia
Attendance: 822
Referee: Aleksei Kulbakov (Belarus)
12 October 2021
20:45 (21:45 UTC+3)

| Lithuania | 0–4 | Switzerland |
|---|---|---|
| | Report (FIFA); Report (UEFA) | Embolo 31', 45'; Steffen 42'; Gavranović 90+4' |

LFF Stadium, Vilnius
Attendance: 1,806
Referee: Tiago Martins (Portugal)

12 November 2021
20:45

| Italy | 1–1 | Switzerland |
|---|---|---|
| Di Lorenzo 36' | Report (FIFA); Report (UEFA) | Widmer 11' |

Stadio Olimpico, Rome
Attendance: 45,699
Referee: Anthony Taylor (England)
12 November 2021
20:45 (19:45 UTC±0)

| Northern Ireland | 1–0 | Lithuania |
|---|---|---|
| Šatkus 18' (o.g.) | Report (FIFA); Report (UEFA) |

Windsor Park, Belfast
Attendance: 14,336
Referee: István Vad (Hungary)

15 November 2021
20:45 (19:45 UTC±0)

| Northern Ireland | 0–0 | Italy |
|---|---|---|
| | Report (FIFA); Report (UEFA) |

Windsor Park, Belfast
Attendance: 15,969
Referee: István Kovács (Romania)
15 November 2021
20:45

| Switzerland | 4–0 | Bulgaria |
|---|---|---|
| Okafor 48'; Vargas 57'; Itten 72'; Freuler 90+1' | Report (FIFA); Report (UEFA) |

Swissporarena, Lucerne
Attendance: 14,300
Referee: Benoît Bastien (France)

== Goalscorers ==
There were 44 goals scored in 20 matches, for an average of 2.2 goals per match.

3 goals

- (Switzerland national football team) Breel Embolo

2 goals

- (Bulgaria national football team) Kiril Despodov
- (Bulgaria national football team) Todor Nedelev
- (Italy national football team) Giovanni Di Lorenzo
- (Italy national football team) Ciro Immobile
- (Italy national football team) Moise Kean
- (Lithuania national football team) Fedor Černych
- (Northern Ireland national football team) Conor Washington
- (Switzerland national football team) Steven Zuber

1 goal

- (Bulgaria national football team) Ivaylo Chochev
- (Bulgaria national football team) Atanas Iliev
- (Italy national football team) Andrea Belotti
- (Italy national football team) Domenico Berardi
- (Italy national football team) Federico Chiesa
- (Italy national football team) Manuel Locatelli
- (Italy national football team) Giacomo Raspadori
- (Italy national football team) Stefano Sensi
- (Lithuania national football team) Rolandas Baravykas
- (Lithuania national football team) Justas Lasickas
- (Northern Ireland national football team) Daniel Ballard
- (Northern Ireland national football team) Shayne Lavery
- (Northern Ireland national football team) Paddy McNair
- (Switzerland national football team) Christian Fassnacht
- (Switzerland national football team) Remo Freuler
- (Switzerland national football team) Mario Gavranović
- (Switzerland national football team) Cedric Itten
- (Switzerland national football team) Noah Okafor
- (Switzerland national football team) Haris Seferovic
- (Switzerland national football team) Xherdan Shaqiri
- (Switzerland national football team) Renato Steffen
- (Switzerland national football team) Rubén Vargas
- (Switzerland national football team) Silvan Widmer

1 own goal

- (Lithuania national football team) Benas Šatkus (against Northern Ireland)
- (Lithuania national football team) Edgaras Utkus (against Italy)

== Discipline ==
A player was automatically suspended for the next match for the following offences:

- Receiving a red card (red card suspensions could be extended for serious offences)
- Receiving two yellow cards in two different matches (yellow card suspensions were carried forward to the play-offs, but not the finals or any other future international matches)

The following suspensions were served during the qualifying matches:

| Team | Player | Offence(s) | Suspended for match(es) |
|---|---|---|---|
| Bulgaria | Valentin Antov | (yellow card) vs Northern Ireland (31 March 2021); (yellow card) vs Lithuania (9 October 2021) | vs Northern Ireland (12 October 2021) |
| Bulgaria | Atanas Iliev | (yellow card) vs Northern Ireland (31 March 2021); (yellow card) vs Lithuania (5 September 2021) | vs Lithuania (9 October 2021) |
| Bulgaria | Nikolay Mihaylov | (red card) vs Lithuania (5 September 2021) | vs Lithuania (9 October 2021) |
| Bulgaria | Georgi Yomov | (yellow card) vs Italy (2 September 2021); (yellow card) vs Lithuania (9 October 2021) | vs Northern Ireland (12 October 2021) |
| Italy | Manuel Locatelli | (yellow card) vs Bulgaria (28 March 2021); (yellow card) vs Lithuania (31 March 2021) | vs Bulgaria (2 September 2021) |
| Lithuania | Fedor Černych | (yellow card) vs Switzerland (28 March 2021); (yellow card) vs Bulgaria (5 September 2021) | vs Italy (8 September 2021) |
| Lithuania | Domantas Šimkus | (yellow card) vs Italy (31 March 2021); (yellow card) vs Bulgaria (5 September 2021) | vs Italy (8 September 2021) |
| Lithuania | Egidijus Vaitkūnas | (yellow card) vs Italy (31 March 2021); (yellow card) vs Bulgaria (9 October 2021) | vs Switzerland (12 October 2021) |
| Northern Ireland | Jamal Lewis | (yellow card) (yellow-red card) vs Switzerland (9 October 2021) | vs Bulgaria (12 October 2021) |
| Northern Ireland | Paddy McNair | (yellow card) vs Bulgaria (31 March 2021); (yellow card) vs Lithuania (2 September 2021) | vs Switzerland (8 September 2021) |
| Northern Ireland | George Saville | (yellow card) vs Italy (25 March 2021); (yellow card) vs Bulgaria (31 March 2021) | vs Lithuania (2 September 2021) |
| Switzerland | Manuel Akanji | (yellow card) vs Bulgaria (25 March 2021); (yellow card) vs Italy (12 November 2021) | vs Bulgaria (15 November 2021) |
| Switzerland | Fabian Frei | (yellow card) vs Italy (5 September 2021); (yellow card) vs Northern Ireland (8 September 2021) | vs Northern Ireland (9 October 2021) |
| Switzerland | Remo Freuler | (red card) vs Spain in UEFA Euro 2020 (2 July 2021) | vs Italy (5 September 2021) |
| Switzerland | Denis Zakaria | (yellow card) vs Northern Ireland (8 September 2021); (yellow card) vs Northern Ireland (9 October 2021) | vs Lithuania (12 October 2021) |
