= Estádio Algarve =

Football stadium in Faro/Loulé, Portugal

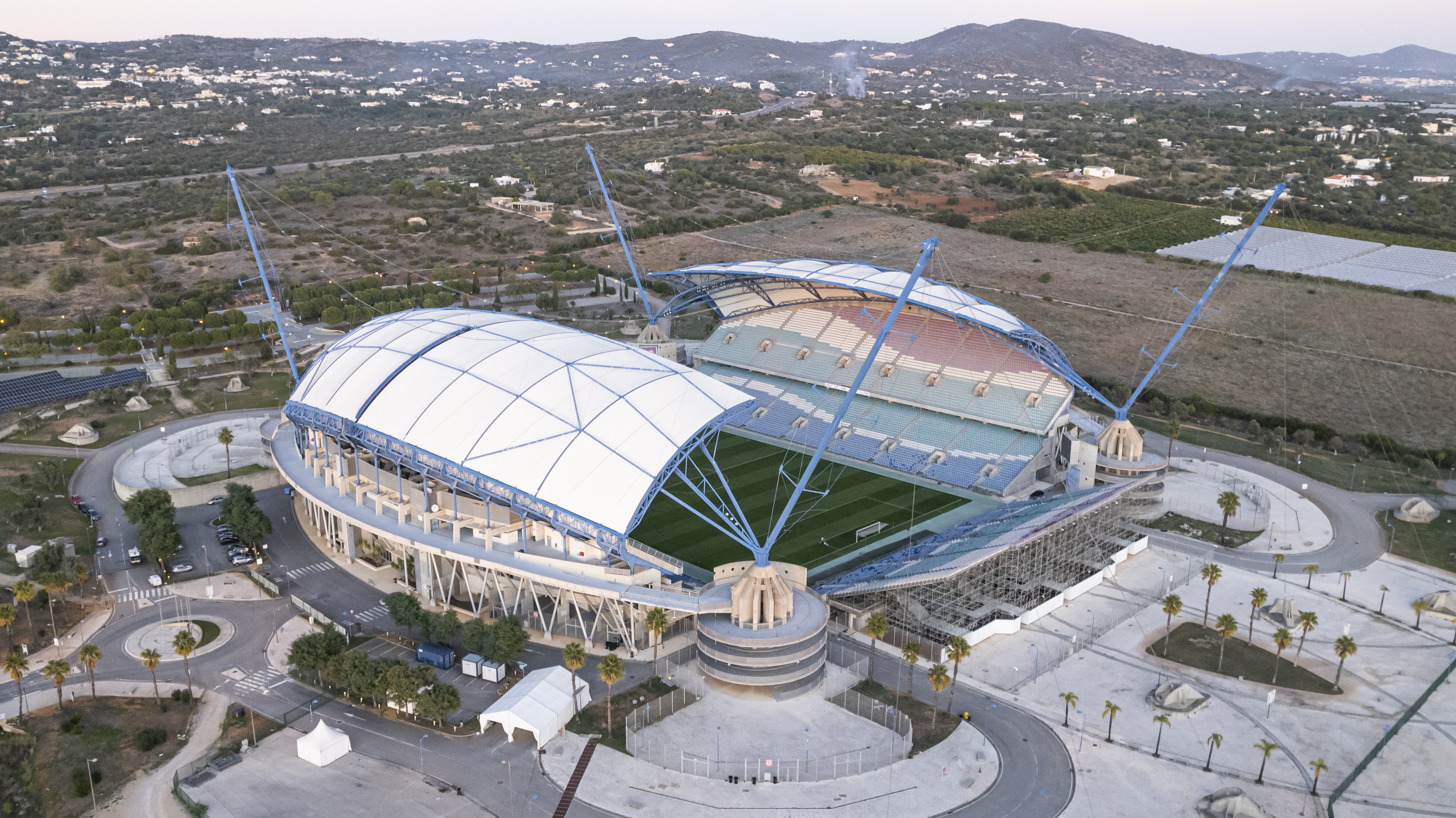
- UEFA
- Interactive map of Estádio Algarve
- Location: Faro-Loulé, Algarve, Portugal
- Coordinates: 37°05′18″N 7°58′29″W
- Owner: Faro Municipality and Loulé Municipality
- Capacity: 30,305; 22,000 (league)
- Surface: Grass
- Scoreboard: Philips
- Record attendance: 29,021 (14 August 2013); Portugal 1–1 Netherlands
- Field size: 105 x 68 m

Construction
- Opened: 23 November 2003
- Cost: €66.364 million
- Architects: Populous (formerly HOK Sport Venue Event)

Tenants
- Farense (2004–2013) (2024–Selected Matches); Louletano (2004–); Gibraltar national football team (2013–2017, 2023–) (temporary); Portugal national football team (selected matches); Algarve United (disbanded)

The Estádio Algarve (English: Algarve Stadium) is an association football stadium located between Faro and Loulé municipalities, in the Algarve region of Portugal. The stadium has a total capacity of 30,305 spectators and was purposely built for the UEFA Euro 2004 championship. Since 2023, only 22,000 seats are made available for football matches due to security concerns.

== History ==
The Estádio Algarve was designed in the summer of 2000 in accordance with UEFA and FIFA standards by Populous for the UEFA Euro 2004 championship hosted in Portugal. The design team included WS Atkins engineers and local partners including Marobal. The design is regional in nature, alluding to the maritime traditions of Portugal and harmonizing with the distinctive local landscape of the region of Algarve. The stadium is considered a model small/regional flexible use stadium for football and other sports and cultural events, being one of the most used stadiums in Portugal, compared to others used only for matches in the main Portuguese Football League.

From 2004 to 2013, Louletano shared the stadium with Sporting Clube Farense. Since 2004, the Estádio Algarve has hosted several matches of the Portugal national football team. A former home of Farense and Louletano shortly after its inauguration, the stadium also received some Olhanense and Portimonense matches during their respective stadiums' works of renovation since those teams are also from the region of Algarve. The Algarve Stadium also hosts the final match of the Algarve Cup, a major annual international tournament for women's football national teams, and the Algarve Football Cup, a pre-season friendly tournament for men's football clubs.

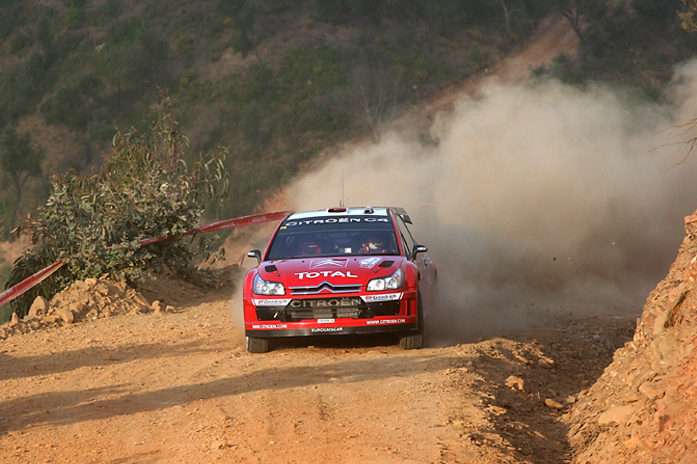
Sébastien Loeb driving his Citroën C4 WRC at the 2007 Rally de Portugal won by him. The rally included super special stages performed at the stadium.

The stadium hosted the inaugural Algarve Challenge Cup tournament on 22 and 24 July 2008 that saw Cardiff City, Celtic, Middlesbrough, and Vitória de Guimarães in action. Cardiff City were the eventual winners of the tournament with victories over Celtic and Vitória.

The Estádio Algarve was also the temporary home ground of the Gibraltar national football team around the mid-2010s. It will once again host Gibraltar from March 2023 while improvements are made to the Victoria Stadium.

Aside from football, it has also hosted music festivals and concerts, and has been temporarily converted into a super special stage during the Rally de Portugal, including the 2007 Rally de Portugal (part of the 2007 World Rally Championship season) and the 2010 Rally de Portugal (the sixth round of the 2010 World Rally Championship season).

== UEFA Euro 2004 ==
The following UEFA Euro 2004 matches were held in the stadium.

Date	Team #1	Result	Team #2	Round	Attendance
12 June 2004	Spain	1–0	Russia	Group A	28,182
20 June 2004	Russia	2–1	Greece	Group A	24,347
26 June 2004	Sweden	0–0 (4–5 p)	Netherlands	Quarter-finals	27,762

== Portugal national team matches ==
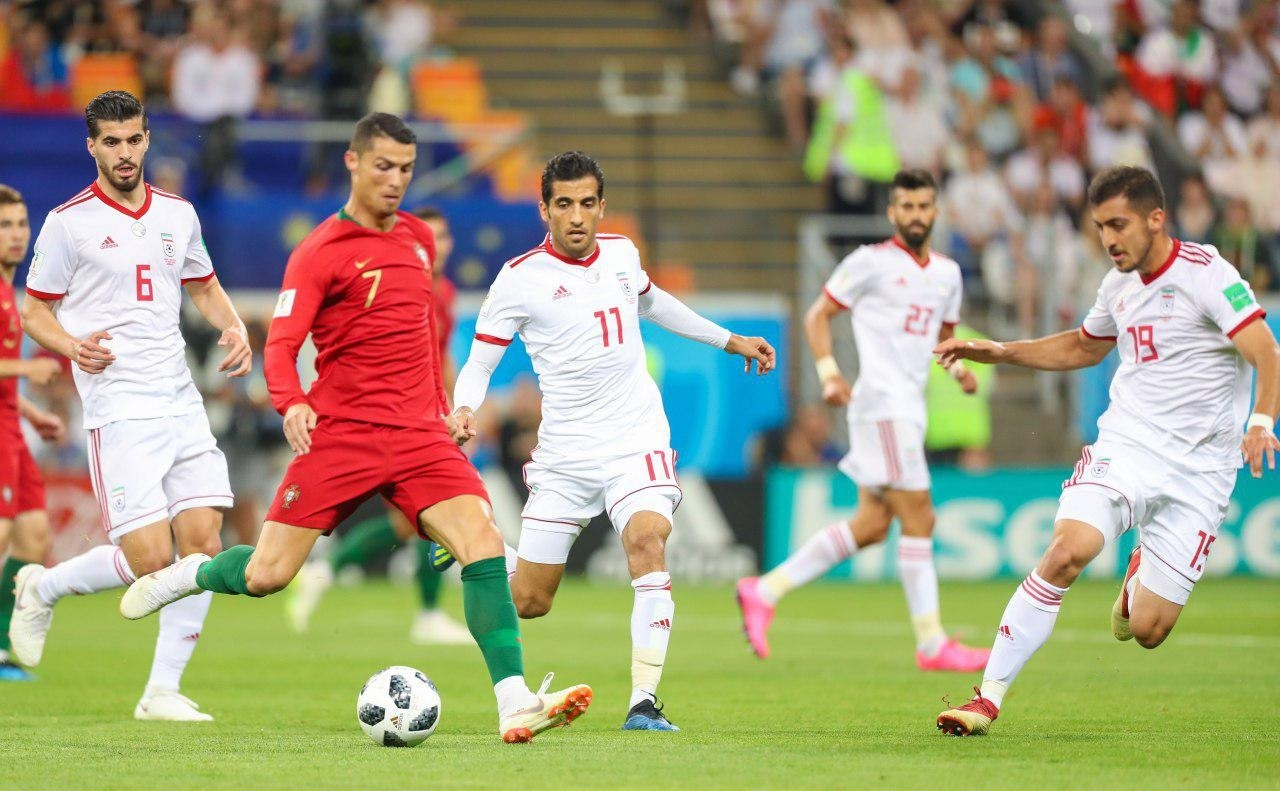
On 1 September 2021, in a Portugal and Republic of Ireland match played at Algarve Stadium, Cristiano Ronaldo became all-time leading goalscorer in men's international football with 111 goals, after surpassing Iranian legend Ali Daei's long-standing record of 109. On 9 October, in a 3–0 friendly win over Qatar at Algarve Stadium Cristiano Ronaldo made his 181st international appearance overtaking Sergio Ramos's record for the most international caps received by a European player. On the following match, played also at Algarve Stadium on October 12, Ronaldo became the first player ever to score 10 hat-tricks in men's international football. The image shows Cristiano Ronaldo playing for Portugal in an Iran and Portugal match at the FIFA World Cup 2018.

The following national team matches were held at the stadium.

#	Date	Score	Opponent	Competition
1.	18 February 2004	1–1	England	Friendly
2.	3 September 2005	6–0	Luxembourg	2006 World Cup qualification
3.	11 February 2009	1–0	Finland	Friendly
4.	10 August 2011	5–0	Luxembourg	Friendly
5.	15 August 2012	2–0	Panama	Friendly
6.	14 August 2013	1–1	Netherlands	Friendly
7.	14 November 2014	1–0	Armenia	Euro 2016 qualifying
8.	13 November 2016	4–1	Latvia	2018 World Cup qualification
9.	6 September 2018	1–1	Croatia	Friendly
10.	14 November 2019	6–0	Lithuania	Euro 2020 qualifying
11.	1 September 2021	2–1	Republic of Ireland	2022 FIFA World Cup qualification
12.	9 October 2021	3–0	Qatar	Friendly
13.	12 October 2021	5–0	Luxembourg	2022 FIFA World Cup qualification
14.	11 September 2023	9–0	Luxembourg	UEFA Euro 2024 qualifying

== Gibraltar national team matches ==
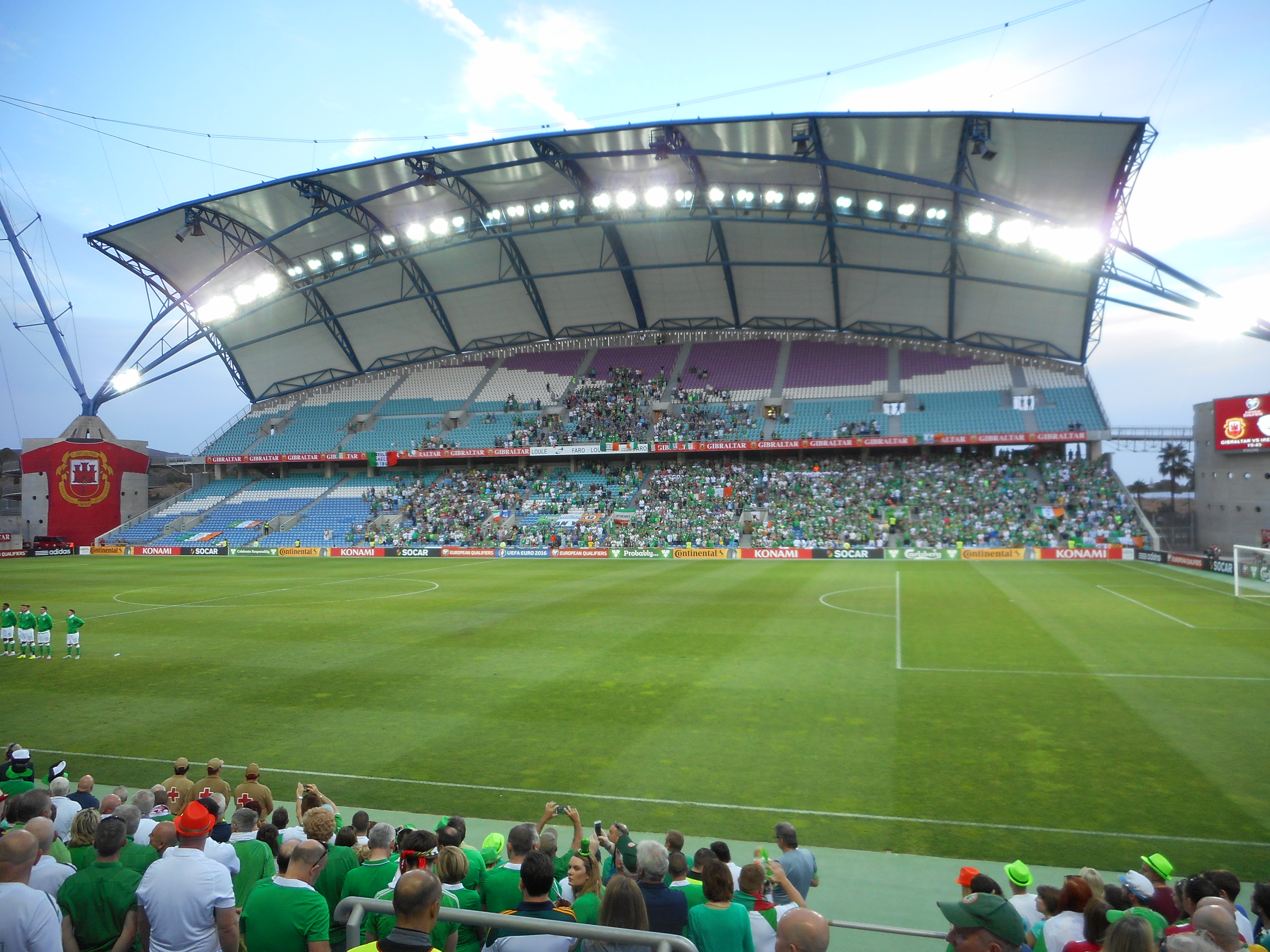
Gibraltar and Republic of Ireland national football teams playing a match in Algarve Stadium, 2015.

The following national team matches were held at the stadium.

#	Date	Score	Opponent	Competition
1.	19 November 2013	0–0	Slovakia	Friendly
2.	4 June 2014	1–0	Malta	Friendly
3.	7 September 2014	0–7	Poland	UEFA Euro 2016 qualification
4.	14 October 2014	0–3	Georgia	UEFA Euro 2016 qualification
5.	13 June 2015	0–7	Germany	UEFA Euro 2016 qualification
6.	4 September 2015	0–4	Republic of Ireland	UEFA Euro 2016 qualification
7.	11 October 2015	0–6	Scotland	UEFA Euro 2016 qualification
8.	6 September 2016	1–4	Greece	2018 FIFA World Cup qualification
9.	10 October 2016	0–6	Belgium	2018 FIFA World Cup qualification
10.	9 June 2017	1–2	Cyprus	2018 FIFA World Cup qualification
11.	3 September 2017	0–4	Bosnia and Herzegovina	2018 FIFA World Cup qualification
12.	7 October 2017	0–6	Estonia	2018 FIFA World Cup qualification
13.	24 March 2023	0–3	Greece	UEFA Euro 2024 qualifying
14.	16 June 2023	0–3	France	UEFA Euro 2024 qualifying
15.	16 October 2023	0–4	Republic of Ireland	UEFA Euro 2024 qualifying
16.	21 November 2023	0–6	Netherlands	UEFA Euro 2024 qualifying
17.	21 March 2024	0–1	Lithuania	2022–23 UEFA Nations League relegation playoffs
18.	3 June 2024	0–2	Scotland	Friendly
19.	6 June 2024	0–0	Wales	Friendly
20.	25 March 2025	0–4	Czech Republic	2026 FIFA World Cup qualification
21.	6 June 2025	0–7	Croatia	2026 FIFA World Cup qualification

== See also ==
- List of association football stadiums by capacity
- List of European stadiums by capacity
