= 2022 FIFA World Cup qualification – UEFA Group D =

Football tournament qualification round

The 2022 FIFA World Cup qualification UEFA Group D was one of the ten UEFA groups in the World Cup qualification tournament to decide which teams would qualify for the 2022 FIFA World Cup finals tournament in Qatar. Group D consisted of five teams: Bosnia and Herzegovina, Finland, France (the title holders), Kazakhstan and Ukraine. The teams played against each other home-and-away in a round-robin format.

The group winners, France, qualified directly for the World Cup finals, while the runners-up, Ukraine, advanced to the second round (play-offs).

== Standings ==
Pos	Team	Pld	W	D	L	GF	GA	GD	Pts	Qualification	France	Ukraine	Finland	Bosnia and Herzegovina	Kazakhstan
1	France	8	5	3	0	18	3	+15	18	Qualification for 2022 FIFA World Cup	—	1–1	2–0	1–1	8–0
2	Ukraine	8	2	6	0	11	8	+3	12	Advance to play-offs	1–1	—	1–1	1–1	1–1
3	Finland	8	3	2	3	10	10	0	11		0–2	1–2	—	2–2	1–0
4	Bosnia and Herzegovina	8	1	4	3	9	12	−3	7		0–1	0–2	1–3	—	2–2
5	Kazakhstan	8	0	3	5	5	20	−15	3		0–2	2–2	0–2	0–2	—

Source: FIFA, UEFA
Rules for classification: Tiebreakers

== Matches ==
The fixture list was confirmed by UEFA on 8 December 2020, the day following the draw. Times are CET/CEST, (Note: CET (UTC+1) for matches until 27 March and from 31 October (matchday 1 and 9–10), and CEST (UTC+2) for matches from 28 March to 30 October 2021 (matchday 2–8).) as listed by UEFA (local times, if different, are in parentheses).

24 March 2021
20:45 (21:45 UTC+2)

Finland	2–2	Bosnia and Herzegovina
Pukki 58', 77'	Report (FIFA); Report (UEFA)	Pjanić 55'; Stevanović 84'

Helsinki Olympic Stadium, Helsinki
Attendance: 0 (Note: Due to the COVID-19 pandemic in Europe, the match was played behind closed doors.)
Referee: Anastasios Sidiropoulos (Greece)
24 March 2021
20:45

France	1–1	Ukraine
Griezmann 19'	Report (FIFA); Report (UEFA)	Sydorchuk 57'

Stade de France, Saint-Denis
Attendance: 0
Referee: Tobias Stieler (Germany)

28 March 2021
15:00 (19:00 UTC+6)

Kazakhstan	0–2	France
	Report (FIFA); Report (UEFA)	Dembélé 19'; Malyi 44' (o.g.)

Astana Arena, Nur-Sultan
Attendance: 0
Referee: Aleksei Kulbakov (Belarus)
28 March 2021
20:45 (21:45 UTC+3)

Ukraine	1–1	Finland
Moraes 80'	Report (FIFA); Report (UEFA)	Pukki 89' (pen.)

Olympic Stadium, Kyiv
Attendance: 0
Referee: István Kovács (Romania)

31 March 2021
20:45

Bosnia and Herzegovina	0–1	France
	Report (FIFA); Report (UEFA)	Griezmann 60'

Stadion Grbavica, Sarajevo
Attendance: 0
Referee: Daniele Orsato (Italy)
31 March 2021
20:45 (21:45 UTC+3)

Ukraine	1–1	Kazakhstan
Yaremchuk 20'	Report (FIFA); Report (UEFA)	Muzhikov 59'

Olympic Stadium, Kyiv
Attendance: 0
Referee: Matej Jug (Slovenia)

1 September 2021
16:00 (20:00 UTC+6)

Kazakhstan	2–2	Ukraine
Valiullin 74', 90+6'	Report (FIFA); Report (UEFA)	Yaremchuk 2'; Sikan 90+3'

Astana Arena, Nur-Sultan
Attendance: 6,274
Referee: Donatas Rumšas (Lithuania)
1 September 2021
20:45

France	1–1	Bosnia and Herzegovina
Griezmann 40'	Report (FIFA); Report (UEFA)	Džeko 36'

Stade de la Meinau, Strasbourg
Attendance: 21,754
Referee: Sandro Schärer (Switzerland)

4 September 2021
15:00 (16:00 UTC+3)

Finland	1–0	Kazakhstan
Pohjanpalo 60'	Report (FIFA); Report (UEFA)

Helsinki Olympic Stadium, Helsinki
Attendance: 10,167
Referee: Sergei Ivanov (Russia)
4 September 2021
20:45 (21:45 UTC+3)

Ukraine	1–1	France
Shaparenko 44'	Report (FIFA); Report (UEFA)	Martial 50'

Olympic Stadium, Kyiv
Attendance: 48,000
Referee: Slavko Vinčić (Slovenia)

7 September 2021
20:45

Bosnia and Herzegovina	2–2	Kazakhstan
Pjanić 74' (pen.); Menalo 86'	Report (FIFA); Report (UEFA)	Kuat 52'; Zaynutdinov 90+5'

Bilino Polje Stadium, Zenica
Attendance: 3,980
Referee: Yigal Frid (Israel)
7 September 2021
20:45

France	2–0	Finland
Griezmann 25', 53'	Report (FIFA); Report (UEFA)

Parc Olympique Lyonnais, Lyon
Attendance: 57,057
Referee: Deniz Aytekin (Germany)

9 October 2021
15:00 (19:00 UTC+6)

Kazakhstan	0–2	Bosnia and Herzegovina
	Report (FIFA); Report (UEFA)	Prevljak 25', 66'

Astana Arena, Nur-Sultan
Attendance: 12,897
Referee: Davide Massa (Italy)
9 October 2021
18:00 (19:00 UTC+3)

Finland	1–2	Ukraine
Pukki 29'	Report (FIFA); Report (UEFA)	Yarmolenko 4'; Yaremchuk 34'

Helsinki Olympic Stadium, Helsinki
Attendance: 29,485
Referee: Jesús Gil Manzano (Spain)

12 October 2021
16:00 (20:00 UTC+6)

Kazakhstan	0–2	Finland
	Report (FIFA); Report (UEFA)	Pukki 45', 48'

Astana Arena, Nur-Sultan
Attendance: 8,365
Referee: Halis Özkahya (Turkey)
12 October 2021
20:45 (21:45 UTC+3)

Ukraine	1–1	Bosnia and Herzegovina
Yarmolenko 15'	Report (FIFA); Report (UEFA)	Ahmedhodžić 77'

Arena Lviv, Lviv
Attendance: 23,810
Referee: Felix Zwayer (Germany)

13 November 2021
15:00

Bosnia and Herzegovina	1–3	Finland
Menalo 69'	Report (FIFA); Report (UEFA)	Forss 29'; Lod 51'; O'Shaughnessy 73'

Bilino Polje Stadium, Zenica
Attendance: 10,000
Referee: Michael Oliver (England)
13 November 2021
20:45

France	8–0	Kazakhstan
Mbappé 6', 12', 32', 87'; Benzema 55', 59'; Rabiot 75'; Griezmann 84' (pen.)	Report (FIFA); Report (UEFA)

Parc des Princes, Paris
Attendance: 45,551
Referee: Glenn Nyberg (Sweden)

16 November 2021
20:45

Bosnia and Herzegovina	0–2	Ukraine
	Report (FIFA); Report (UEFA)	Zinchenko 59'; Dovbyk 79'

Bilino Polje Stadium, Zenica
Attendance: 3,370
Referee: Antonio Mateu Lahoz (Spain)
16 November 2021
20:45 (21:45 UTC+2)

Finland	0–2	France
	Report (FIFA); Report (UEFA)	Benzema 66'; Mbappé 76'

Helsinki Olympic Stadium, Helsinki
Attendance: 31,890
Referee: Marco Guida (Italy)

== Goalscorers ==
There were 53 goals scored in 20 matches, for an average of 2.65 goals per match.

6 goals

- (Finland) Teemu Pukki
- (France) Antoine Griezmann

5 goals

- (France) Kylian Mbappé

3 goals

- (France) Karim Benzema
- (Ukraine) Roman Yaremchuk

2 goals

- (Bosnia and Herzegovina) Luka Menalo
- (Bosnia and Herzegovina) Miralem Pjanić
- (Bosnia and Herzegovina) Smail Prevljak
- (Kazakhstan) Ruslan Valiullin
- (Ukraine) Andriy Yarmolenko

1 goal

- (Bosnia and Herzegovina) Anel Ahmedhodžić
- (Bosnia and Herzegovina) Edin Džeko
- (Bosnia and Herzegovina) Miroslav Stevanović
- (Finland) Marcus Forss
- (Finland) Robin Lod
- (Finland) Daniel O'Shaughnessy
- (Finland) Joel Pohjanpalo
- (France) Ousmane Dembélé
- (France) Anthony Martial
- (France) Adrien Rabiot
- (Kazakhstan) Islambek Kuat
- (Kazakhstan) Serikzhan Muzhikov
- (Kazakhstan) Bakhtiyar Zaynutdinov
- (Ukraine) Artem Dovbyk
- (Ukraine) Júnior Moraes
- (Ukraine) Mykola Shaparenko
- (Ukraine) Danylo Sikan
- (Ukraine) Serhiy Sydorchuk
- (Ukraine) Oleksandr Zinchenko

1 own goal

- (Kazakhstan) Serhiy Malyi (against France)

== Discipline ==
A player was automatically suspended for the next match for the following offences:

- Receiving a red card (red card suspensions could be extended for serious offences)
- Receiving two yellow cards in two different matches (yellow card suspensions were carried forward to the play-offs, but not the finals or any other future international matches)

The following suspensions were served during the qualifying matches:

Team	Player	Offence(s)	Suspended for match(es)
Bosnia and Herzegovina	Amir Hadžiahmetović	(yellow card) vs France (31 March 2021); (yellow card) vs France (1 September 2021)	vs Kazakhstan (7 September 2021)
Bosnia and Herzegovina	Dennis Hadžikadunić	(yellow card) vs France (31 March 2021); (yellow card) vs Kazakhstan (7 September 2021)	vs Kazakhstan (9 October 2021)
Finland	Glen Kamara	(yellow card) vs Bosnia and Herzegovina (24 March 2021); (yellow card) vs Ukraine (28 March 2021)	vs Kazakhstan (4 September 2021)
Finland	Jukka Raitala	(red card) vs Bosnia and Herzegovina (13 November 2021)	vs France (16 November 2021)
Finland	Rasmus Schüller	(yellow card) vs Bosnia and Herzegovina (24 March 2021); (yellow card) vs France (7 September 2021)	vs Ukraine (9 October 2021)
Finland	Jere Uronen	(red card) vs Wales in 2020–21 UEFA Nations League (18 November 2020)	vs Bosnia and Herzegovina (24 March 2021)
France	Jules Koundé	(red card) vs Bosnia and Herzegovina (1 September 2021)	vs Ukraine (4 September 2021) vs Finland (7 September 2021)
Kazakhstan	Islambek Kuat	(yellow card) (yellow-red card) vs Lithuania in 2020–21 UEFA Nations League (18 November 2020)	vs France (28 March 2021)
Kazakhstan	Stas Pokatilov	(yellow card) vs Ukraine (31 March 2021); (yellow card) vs Ukraine (1 September 2021)	vs Finland (4 September 2021)
Kazakhstan	Vladislav Vasilyev	(yellow card) vs Ukraine (1 September 2021); (yellow card) vs Bosnia and Herzrgovina (7 September 2021)	vs Bosnia and Herzegovina (9 October 2021)
Kazakhstan	Yan Vorogovsky	(yellow card) vs Ukraine (31 March 2021); (yellow card) vs Finland (12 October 2021)	vs France (13 November 2021)
Kazakhstan	Bakhtiyar Zaynutdinov	(yellow card) vs Bosnia and Herzegovina (7 September 2021); (yellow card) vs Finland (12 October 2021)	vs France (13 November 2021)
Ukraine	Vitalii Mykolenko	(red card) vs Finland (28 March 2021)	vs Kazakhstan (31 March 2021)
Ukraine	Oleksandr Zinchenko	(yellow card) vs Kazakhstan (31 March 2021); (yellow card) vs Kazakhstan (1 September 2021)	vs France (4 September 2021)
