= 2022 FIFA World Cup qualification (UEFA) =

Tournament details
- Dates: 24 March 2021 – 5 June 2022
- Teams: 55 (from 1 confederation)

Tournament statistics
- Matches played: 258
- Goals scored: 781 (3.03 per match)
- Attendance: 3,036,083 (11,768 per match)
- Top scorer(s): (England) Harry Kane (Netherlands) Memphis Depay (12 goals each)

The European section of the 2022 FIFA World Cup qualification acted as qualifiers for the 2022 FIFA World Cup, held in Qatar, for national teams that were members of the Union of European Football Associations (UEFA). A total of 13 slots in the final tournament were available for UEFA teams.

== Entrants ==
All 55 FIFA-affiliated national teams from UEFA entered qualification.

=== Status of Russia ===
On 9 December 2019, the World Anti-Doping Agency initially handed Russia a four-year ban from all major international sporting events, after RUSADA was found non-compliant for handing over manipulated lab data to investigators. However, the Russia national team could still enter qualification, as the ban only applies to the World Cup proper as a world championship. The WADA ruling allowed athletes who were not involved in doping or the coverup to compete, but prohibited the use of the Russian flag and anthem at major international sporting events. An appeal to the Court of Arbitration for Sport was filed, but WADA's decision was upheld though reduced to a two-year ban. The CAS ruling also allowed the name "Russia" to be displayed on uniforms if the words "Neutral Athlete" or "Neutral Team" have equal prominence. If Russia had qualified for the tournament, its players would not have been able to use their country's name alone, flag or anthem at the World Cup, as a result of the nation's two-year ban from world championships and Olympic Games in all sports.

On 27 February 2022, after the threat of boycotts by the Czech Republic, Poland and Sweden amid the Russian invasion of Ukraine, FIFA prohibited the Russia national football team from playing home matches in Russia; the team would have to play matches behind closed doors at neutral sites. In addition, the team would have been prohibited from competing under the name, flag, or national anthem of Russia, and had to compete under the name "Football Union of Russia" (RFU). On 28 February, however, following a recommendation by the International Olympic Committee (IOC), FIFA suspended the participation of Russia. Poland were subsequently given a walkover for their play-off semi-final match scheduled against Russia. The Russian Football Union announced they would appeal the decision to the Court of Arbitration for Sport. Their request for a temporary lift of the ban was rejected on 18 March.

== Format ==
The qualification format was confirmed by the UEFA Executive Committee during their meeting in Nyon, Switzerland, on 4 December 2019. The qualification would depend, in part, on results from the 2020–21 UEFA Nations League, although to a lesser degree than the 2018–19 UEFA Nations League had on qualification for UEFA Euro 2020. The structure maintained UEFA's usual 'group stage/play-off stage' structure, with only the specific format of the play-offs amended.

- Group stage: Five groups of five teams and five groups of six. Group winners qualified for the World Cup finals.
- Play-off stage: 12 teams (ten group runners-up and two best Nations League group winners, based on the Nations League overall ranking, that finished outside the top two of their qualifying group) were drawn into three play-off paths, playing two rounds of single-match play-offs (semi-finals with the seeded teams to host, followed by finals, with the home teams to be drawn). The three path winners qualified for the World Cup finals.

On 4 December 2019, the UEFA Executive Committee initially approved the use of the video assistant referee system for the qualifiers. However, VAR was not implemented at the start of qualification due to the impact of the COVID-19 pandemic on operational and logistical capabilities. On 5 August 2021, UEFA announced that the VAR system would be used for the remainder of qualification, starting from September 2021.

== Schedule ==
Below is the schedule of the European qualifiers for the 2022 FIFA World Cup.

In March 2020, UEFA announced that the two matchdays planned to take place in June 2021 would be moved following the rescheduling of UEFA Euro 2020 to June and July 2021 due to the COVID-19 pandemic. To allow for the completion of the qualifying group stage in November 2021 as scheduled, UEFA announced on 24 September 2020 that the March and September 2021 windows in the FIFA International Match Calendar were expanded from two to three matchdays. The changes to the International Match Calendar for March and September 2021, which extended each window by one day, were approved by the FIFA Council on 4 December 2020.

Round	Matchday	Dates
First round (group stage)	Matchday 1	24–25 March 2021
First round (group stage)	Matchday 2	27–28 March 2021
First round (group stage)	Matchday 3	30–31 March 2021
First round (group stage)	Matchday 4	1–2 September 2021
First round (group stage)	Matchday 5	4–5 September 2021
First round (group stage)	Matchday 6	7–8 September 2021
First round (group stage)	Matchday 7	8–9 October 2021
First round (group stage)	Matchday 8	11–12 October 2021
First round (group stage)	Matchday 9	11–13 November 2021
First round (group stage)	Matchday 10	14–16 November 2021
Second round (play-offs)	Semi-finals	24 March & 1 June 2022 (Note: Due to postponements in Path A of the second round, one semi-final and one final match were played in June 2022.)
Second round (play-offs)	Finals	29 March & 5 June 2022

The original schedule of the qualifying group stage, as planned before the pandemic, was as follows.

Original group stage schedule
Matchday	Dates
Matchday 1	25–27 March 2021
Matchday 2	28–30 March 2021
Matchday 3	4–5 June 2021
Matchday 4	7–8 June 2021
Matchday 5	2–4 September 2021
Matchday 6	5–7 September 2021
Matchday 7	7–9 October 2021
Matchday 8	10–12 October 2021
Matchday 9	11–13 November 2021
Matchday 10	14–16 November 2021

== First round ==
=== Seeding ===
The draw for the first round (group stage) was held in Zürich, Switzerland, on 7 December 2020, 18:00 CET (UTC+1). However, due to the COVID-19 pandemic, the draw occurred as a virtual event without any representatives of member associations present. It was originally planned to be held on 29 November 2020. On 18 June 2020, the UEFA Executive Committee approved the draw regulations for the qualifying group stage. The draw was presented by Spanish journalist Cristina Gullón and conducted by FIFA's acting director of competitions, Jaime Yarza. He was assisted by former footballers Daniele De Rossi and Rafael van der Vaart, who drew the balls from the pots.

The 55 teams were seeded into six pots based on the November 2020 FIFA World Rankings, after the conclusion of the league phase of the 2020–21 UEFA Nations League. Pots 1 to 5 contained ten teams, while Pot 6 contained five teams. The teams were drawn into ten groups: five groups of five teams (Groups A–E) and five groups of six teams (Groups F–J). The draw started with Pot 1 and was completed with Pot 6, from where a team was drawn and assigned to the first available group in alphabetical order. Therefore, each six-team group contains one team from each of the six pots, while each five-team group contains one team from each of the first five pots.

The following restrictions were applied with computer assistance:

- Nations League finalists: The four teams participating in the 2021 UEFA Nations League Finals (Belgium, France, Italy, and Spain) were guaranteed to be drawn into groups with only five teams (Groups A–E). A group could contain a maximum of one Nations League finalist (this condition was fulfilled automatically since all four teams were in the same pot).
- Prohibited clashes: For political reasons, matches between following pairs of teams were considered prohibited clashes, unable to be drawn into the same group: Kosovo–Bosnia and Herzegovina, Kosovo–Serbia, Kosovo–Russia, Russia–Ukraine. (Additionally, Armenia–Azerbaijan and Gibraltar–Spain were identified as prohibited clashes, but the teams in the former pair were in the same pot for the draw, while the teams in the latter pair were restricted to different-sized groups based on draw pots and conditions.)
- Winter venues: A maximum of two teams whose venues are identified as having high or medium risk of severe winter conditions could be placed in each group: Belarus, Estonia, Faroe Islands, Finland, Iceland, Latvia, Lithuania, Norway, Russia, Ukraine.
  - The two "hard winter venues" (Faroe Islands and Iceland) generally cannot host games in March or November, and therefore could not be drawn together; the others shall play as few home matches as possible in March and November.
- Excessive travel: A maximum of one pair of teams identified with excessive travel distance in relation to other countries could be placed in each group:
  - Azerbaijan: with Iceland, Gibraltar, Portugal.
  - Iceland: with Armenia, Cyprus, Georgia, Israel.
  - Kazakhstan: with England, France, Gibraltar, Iceland, Malta, Northern Ireland, Portugal, Republic of Ireland, Scotland, Spain, Wales. (Andorra and Faroe Islands were also identified with Kazakhstan for excessive travel distance, but the teams were in the same pot for the draw.)

Teams were allocated to seeding pots as follows (November 2020 FIFA Rankings shown in second column).

Pot 1
Team	Rank
Belgium	1
France	2
England	4
Portugal	5
Spain	6
Italy	10
Croatia	11
Denmark	12
Germany	13
Netherlands	14

Pot 4
Team	Rank
Bosnia and Herzegovina	55
Slovenia	62
Montenegro	63
North Macedonia	65
Albania	66
Bulgaria	68
Israel	87
Belarus	88
Georgia	89
Luxembourg	98

Pot 2
Team	Rank
Switzerland	16
Wales	18
Poland	19
Sweden	20
Austria	23
Ukraine	24
Serbia	30
Turkey	32
Slovakia	33
Romania	37

Pot 5
Team	Rank
Armenia	99
Cyprus	100
Faroe Islands	107
Azerbaijan	109
Estonia	109
Kosovo	117
Kazakhstan	122
Lithuania	129
Latvia	136
Andorra	151

Pot 3
Team	Rank
Russia	39
Hungary	40
Republic of Ireland	42
Czech Republic	43
Norway	44
Northern Ireland	45
Iceland	46
Scotland	48
Greece	53
Finland	54

Pot 6
Team	Rank
Malta	176
Moldova	177
Liechtenstein	181
Gibraltar	195
San Marino	210

=== Summary ===
Winner of each group qualified directly for the 2022 FIFA World Cup
Runner-up of each group and best two Nations League group winners advanced to the second round (play-offs)
Other teams were eliminated after the first round
Advanced to the second round (play-offs) as a group runner-up, later suspended

Group A	Group B	Group C	Group D	Group E	Group F	Group G	Group H	Group I	Group J
Serbia	Spain	Switzerland	France	Belgium	Denmark	Netherlands	Croatia	England	Germany
Portugal	Sweden	Italy	Ukraine	Wales	Scotland	Turkey	Russia	Poland	North Macedonia
Republic of Ireland	Greece	Northern Ireland	Finland	Czech Republic	Israel	Norway	Slovakia	Albania	Romania
Luxembourg	Georgia	Bulgaria	Bosnia and Herzegovina	Estonia	Austria	Montenegro	Slovenia	Hungary	Armenia
Azerbaijan	Kosovo	Lithuania	Kazakhstan	Belarus	Faroe Islands	Latvia	Cyprus	Andorra	Iceland
					Moldova	Gibraltar	Malta	San Marino	Liechtenstein

=== Groups ===
The fixture list was confirmed by UEFA on 8 December 2020, the day following the draw. Qatar were partnered with the five-team Group A, which enabled the 2022 FIFA World Cup hosts to play centralised friendlies against these countries on their "spare" match dates. However, these friendlies did not count in the qualifying group standings.

==== Group A ====
Pos	Team	Pld	W	D	L	GF	GA	GD	Pts	Qualification	Serbia	Portugal	Ireland	Luxembourg	Azerbaijan
1	Serbia	8	6	2	0	18	9	+9	20	Qualification for 2022 FIFA World Cup	—	2–2	3–2	4–1	3–1
2	Portugal	8	5	2	1	17	6	+11	17	Advance to play-offs	1–2	—	2–1	5–0	1–0
3	Republic of Ireland	8	2	3	3	11	8	+3	9		1–1	0–0	—	0–1	1–1
4	Luxembourg	8	3	0	5	8	18	−10	9		0–1	1–3	0–3	—	2–1
5	Azerbaijan	8	0	1	7	5	18	−13	1		1–2	0–3	0–3	1–3	—

Source: FIFA, UEFA
Rules for classification: Tiebreakers

==== Group B ====
Pos	Team	Pld	W	D	L	GF	GA	GD	Pts	Qualification	Spain	Sweden	Greece	Georgia	Kosovo
1	Spain	8	6	1	1	15	5	+10	19	Qualification for 2022 FIFA World Cup	—	1–0	1–1	4–0	3–1
2	Sweden	8	5	0	3	12	6	+6	15	Advance to play-offs	2–1	—	2–0	1–0	3–0
3	Greece	8	2	4	2	8	8	0	10		0–1	2–1	—	1–1	1–1
4	Georgia	8	2	1	5	6	12	−6	7		1–2	2–0	0–2	—	0–1
5	Kosovo	8	1	2	5	5	15	−10	5		0–2	0–3	1–1	1–2	—

Source: FIFA, UEFA
Rules for classification: Tiebreakers

==== Group C ====
Pos	Team	Pld	W	D	L	GF	GA	GD	Pts	Qualification	Switzerland	Italy		Bulgaria	Lithuania
1	Switzerland	8	5	3	0	15	2	+13	18	Qualification for 2022 FIFA World Cup	—	0–0	2–0	4–0	1–0
2	Italy	8	4	4	0	13	2	+11	16	Advance to play-offs	1–1	—	2–0	1–1	5–0
3	Northern Ireland	8	2	3	3	6	7	−1	9		0–0	0–0	—	0–0	1–0
4	Bulgaria	8	2	2	4	6	14	−8	8		1–3	0–2	2–1	—	1–0
5	Lithuania	8	1	0	7	4	19	−15	3		0–4	0–2	1–4	3–1	—

Source: FIFA, UEFA
Rules for classification: Tiebreakers

==== Group D ====
Pos	Team	Pld	W	D	L	GF	GA	GD	Pts	Qualification	France	Ukraine	Finland	Bosnia and Herzegovina	Kazakhstan
1	France	8	5	3	0	18	3	+15	18	Qualification for 2022 FIFA World Cup	—	1–1	2–0	1–1	8–0
2	Ukraine	8	2	6	0	11	8	+3	12	Advance to play-offs	1–1	—	1–1	1–1	1–1
3	Finland	8	3	2	3	10	10	0	11		0–2	1–2	—	2–2	1–0
4	Bosnia and Herzegovina	8	1	4	3	9	12	−3	7		0–1	0–2	1–3	—	2–2
5	Kazakhstan	8	0	3	5	5	20	−15	3		0–2	2–2	0–2	0–2	—

Source: FIFA, UEFA
Rules for classification: Tiebreakers

==== Group E ====
Pos	Team	Pld	W	D	L	GF	GA	GD	Pts	Qualification	Belgium	Wales	Czech Republic	Estonia	Belarus
1	Belgium	8	6	2	0	25	6	+19	20	Qualification for 2022 FIFA World Cup	—	3–1	3–0	3–1	8–0
2	Wales	8	4	3	1	14	9	+5	15	Advance to play-offs	1–1	—	1–0	0–0	5–1
3	Czech Republic	8	4	2	2	14	9	+5	14	Advance to play-offs via Nations League	1–1	2–2	—	2–0	1–0
4	Estonia	8	1	1	6	9	21	−12	4		2–5	0–1	2–6	—	2–0
5	Belarus	8	1	0	7	7	24	−17	3		0–1	2–3	0–2	4–2	—

Source: FIFA, UEFA
Rules for classification: Tiebreakers

==== Group F ====
Pos	Team	Pld	W	D	L	GF	GA	GD	Pts	Qualification	Denmark	Scotland	Israel	Austria	Faroe Islands	Moldova
1	Denmark	10	9	0	1	30	3	+27	27	Qualification for 2022 FIFA World Cup	—	2–0	5–0	1–0	3–1	8–0
2	Scotland	10	7	2	1	17	7	+10	23	Advance to play-offs	2–0	—	3–2	2–2	4–0	1–0
3	Israel	10	5	1	4	23	21	+2	16		0–2	1–1	—	5–2	3–2	2–1
4	Austria	10	5	1	4	19	17	+2	16	Advance to play-offs via Nations League	0–4	0–1	4–2	—	3–1	4–1
5	Faroe Islands	10	1	1	8	7	23	−16	4		0–1	0–1	0–4	0–2	—	2–1
6	Moldova	10	0	1	9	5	30	−25	1		0–4	0–2	1–4	0–2	1–1	—

Source: FIFA, UEFA
Rules for classification: Tiebreakers

==== Group G ====
Pos	Team	Pld	W	D	L	GF	GA	GD	Pts	Qualification	Netherlands	Turkey	Norway	Montenegro	Latvia	Gibraltar
1	Netherlands	10	7	2	1	33	8	+25	23	Qualification for 2022 FIFA World Cup	—	6–1	2–0	4–0	2–0	6–0
2	Turkey	10	6	3	1	27	16	+11	21	Advance to play-offs	4–2	—	1–1	2–2	3–3	6–0
3	Norway	10	5	3	2	15	8	+7	18		1–1	0–3	—	2–0	0–0	5–1
4	Montenegro	10	3	3	4	14	15	−1	12		2–2	1–2	0–1	—	0–0	4–1
5	Latvia	10	2	3	5	11	14	−3	9		0–1	1–2	0–2	1–2	—	3–1
6	Gibraltar	10	0	0	10	4	43	−39	0		0–7	0–3	0–3	0–3	1–3	—

Source: FIFA, UEFA
Rules for classification: Tiebreakers

==== Group H ====
Pos	Team	Pld	W	D	L	GF	GA	GD	Pts	Qualification	Croatia	Russia	Slovakia	Slovenia	Cyprus	Malta
1	Croatia	10	7	2	1	21	4	+17	23	Qualification for 2022 FIFA World Cup	—	1–0	2–2	3–0	1–0	3–0
2	Russia (Note: On 28 February 2022, FIFA suspended Russia from international competitions due to the Russian invasion of Ukraine.)	10	7	1	2	19	6	+13	22	Advance to play-offs	0–0	—	1–0	2–1	6–0	2–0
3	Slovakia	10	3	5	2	17	10	+7	14		0–1	2–1	—	2–2	2–0	2–2
4	Slovenia	10	4	2	4	13	12	+1	14		1–0	1–2	1–1	—	2–1	1–0
5	Cyprus	10	1	2	7	4	21	−17	5		0–3	0–2	0–0	1–0	—	2–2
6	Malta	10	1	2	7	9	30	−21	5		1–7	1–3	0–6	0–4	3–0	—

Source: FIFA, UEFA
Rules for classification: Tiebreakers

==== Group I ====
Pos	Team	Pld	W	D	L	GF	GA	GD	Pts	Qualification	England	Poland	Albania	Hungary	Andorra	San Marino
1	England	10	8	2	0	39	3	+36	26	Qualification for 2022 FIFA World Cup	—	2–1	5–0	1–1	4–0	5–0
2	Poland	10	6	2	2	30	11	+19	20	Advance to play-offs	1–1	—	4–1	1–2	3–0	5–0
3	Albania	10	6	0	4	12	12	0	18		0–2	0–1	—	1–0	1–0	5–0
4	Hungary	10	5	2	3	19	13	+6	17		0–4	3–3	0–1	—	2–1	4–0
5	Andorra	10	2	0	8	8	24	−16	6		0–5	1–4	0–1	1–4	—	2–0
6	San Marino	10	0	0	10	1	46	−45	0		0–10	1–7	0–2	0–3	0–3	—

Source: FIFA, UEFA
Rules for classification: Tiebreakers

==== Group J ====
Pos	Team	Pld	W	D	L	GF	GA	GD	Pts	Qualification	Germany	North Macedonia	Romania	Armenia	Iceland	Liechtenstein
1	Germany	10	9	0	1	36	4	+32	27	Qualification for 2022 FIFA World Cup	—	1–2	2–1	6–0	3–0	9–0
2	North Macedonia	10	5	3	2	23	11	+12	18	Advance to play-offs	0–4	—	0–0	0–0	3–1	5–0
3	Romania	10	5	2	3	13	8	+5	17		0–1	3–2	—	1–0	0–0	2–0
4	Armenia	10	3	3	4	9	20	−11	12		1–4	0–5	3–2	—	2–0	1–1
5	Iceland	10	2	3	5	12	18	−6	9		0–4	2–2	0–2	1–1	—	4–0
6	Liechtenstein	10	0	1	9	2	34	−32	1		0–2	0–4	0–2	0–1	1–4	—

Source: FIFA, UEFA
Rules for classification: Tiebreakers

== Second round ==
The second round (play-offs) was contested by the ten group runners-up and the best two Nations League group winners, based on the Nations League overall ranking, who finished outside the top two of their qualifying group. They were separated into three play-off paths, with each path featuring two single-leg semi-finals and one single-leg final. The semi-finals were hosted by the six best-ranked runners-up of the qualifying group stage, while the host of the final was determined by a draw. The semi-finals were played on 24 March and 1 June, and the finals on 29 March and 5 June 2022. The winners of each path qualified for the World Cup.

=== Team selection and seeding ===
==== Second-placed teams ====
The ten runners-up from the first round advanced to the play-offs. Based on the results from the qualifying group stage, the six best-ranked teams were seeded, while the bottom four were unseeded in the semi-final draw. Because some groups had five teams and others had six, matches against the sixth placed team in each group were discarded for the purposes of the ranking.

Seed	Grp	Team	Pld	W	D	L	GF	GA	GD	Pts	Seeding
1	A	Portugal	8	5	2	1	17	6	+11	17	Seeded in semi-final draw
2	F	Scotland	8	5	2	1	14	7	+7	17	Seeded in semi-final draw
3	C	Italy	8	4	4	0	13	2	+11	16	Seeded in semi-final draw
4	H	Russia	8	5	1	2	14	5	+9	16	Seeded in semi-final draw
5	B	Sweden	8	5	0	3	12	6	+6	15	Seeded in semi-final draw
6	E	Wales	8	4	3	1	14	9	+5	15	Seeded in semi-final draw
7	G	Turkey	8	4	3	1	18	16	+2	15	Unseeded in semi-final draw
8	I	Poland	8	4	2	2	18	10	+8	14	Unseeded in semi-final draw
9	J	North Macedonia	8	3	3	2	14	11	+3	12	Unseeded in semi-final draw
10	D	Ukraine	8	2	6	0	11	8	+3	12	Unseeded in semi-final draw

Source: FIFA, UEFA
Rules for classification: Counting only matches against teams ranked first to fifth in the group, 1. Points; 2. Goal difference; 3. Goals scored; 4. Away goals scored; 5. Wins; 6. Away wins; 7. Lower disciplinary points total; 8. Position in 2020–21 UEFA Nations League access list.

==== Nations League group winners ====
The best two Nations League group winners that finished outside the top two of their qualifying group advanced to the play-offs and were unseeded in the semi-final draw.

UNL	Rank	UNL group winner	Qualifying group
A	1	France ^{&}	D
A	2	Spain ^{&}	B
A	3	Italy ^{†}	C
A	4	Belgium ^{&}	E
B	17	Wales ^{†}	E
B	18	Austria ^{‡}	F
B	19	Czech Republic ^{‡}	E
B	20	Hungary	I
C	33	Slovenia	H
C	34	Montenegro	G
C	35	Albania	I
C	36	Armenia	J
D	49	Gibraltar	G
D	50	Faroe Islands	F

Key

- & Team qualified directly for World Cup as qualifying group winner
- † Team advanced to the play-offs as qualifying group runner-up
- ‡ Team (in **bold**) advanced to the play-offs as one of the best two Nations League group winners outside top two of their qualifying group

==== Draw ====
Following the completion of the UEFA first round, the twelve teams that advanced to the play-offs were drawn into three paths of four teams on 26 November 2021, 17:00 CET, in Zürich, Switzerland. The following procedure was applied in the draw:

- The six seeded teams were allocated to semi-finals 1 to 6 as the host team in the order drawn.
- The six unseeded teams were allocated to semi-finals 1 to 6 as the away team in the order drawn.
- Play-off Path A was formed by semi-finals 1 and 2, with the winners of both semi-finals advancing to final A.
- Play-off Path B was formed by semi-finals 3 and 4, with the winners of both semi-finals advancing to final B.
- Play-off Path C was formed by semi-finals 5 and 6, with the winners of both semi-finals advancing to final C.
- The semi-final winners that host play-off finals A, B and C were decided by a draw.

For political reasons related to the Russo-Ukrainian War, Russia and Ukraine could not be drawn into the same play-off path.

The six runners-up with the best group stage performance were seeded in the semi-final draw, while the remaining four runners-up and two teams advancing via the Nations League were unseeded. The seedings were as follows:

Pot 1 (seeded)
Team	Rank
Portugal	1
Scotland	2
Italy	3
Russia	4
Sweden	5
Wales	6

Pot 2 (unseeded)
Team	Rank
Turkey	7
Poland	8
North Macedonia	9
Ukraine	10
Austria	NL–18
Czech Republic	NL–19

=== Path A ===
Home team	Score	Away team
**Semi-finals**
Scotland	1–3	**Ukraine**
**Wales**	2–1	Austria
**Final**
**Wales**	1–0	Ukraine

=== Path B ===
Home team	Score	Away team
**Semi-finals**
Russia	w/o (Note: Due to the Russian invasion of Ukraine, Russia were suspended, and Poland advanced to the final on a walkover.)	**Poland**
**Sweden**	1–0 (a.e.t.)	Czech Republic
**Final**
**Poland**	2–0	Sweden

=== Path C ===
Home team	Score	Away team
**Semi-finals**
Italy	0–1	**North Macedonia**
**Portugal**	3–1	Turkey
**Final**
**Portugal**	2–0	North Macedonia

== Qualified teams ==
Status of UEFA countries with respect to the 2022 FIFA World Cup: Team has qualified for World Cup Team failed to qualify Team suspended Country not a UEFA member

The following 13 teams from UEFA qualified for the final tournament.

Team	Qualified as	Qualified on	Previous appearances in FIFA World Cup^{1}
Germany	Group J winners	11 October 2021	19 (1934, 1938, **1954**^{2}, 1958^{2}, 1962^{2}, 1966^{2}, 1970^{2}, **1974**^{2}, 1978^{2}, 1982^{2}, 1986^{2}, **1990**^{2}, 1994, 1998, 2002, 2006, 2010, **2014**, 2018)
Denmark	Group F winners	12 October 2021	5 (1986, 1998, 2002, 2010, 2018)
France	Group D winners	13 November 2021	15 (1930, 1934, 1938, 1954, 1958, 1966, 1978, 1982, 1986, **1998**, 2002, 2006, 2010, 2014, **2018**)
Belgium	Group E winners	13 November 2021	13 (1930, 1934, 1938, 1954, 1970, 1982, 1986, 1990, 1994, 1998, 2002, 2014, 2018)
Croatia	Group H winners	14 November 2021	5 (1998, 2002, 2006, 2014, 2018)
Spain	Group B winners	14 November 2021	15 (1934, 1950, 1962, 1966, 1978, 1982, 1986, 1990, 1994, 1998, 2002, 2006, **2010**, 2014, 2018)
Serbia	Group A winners	14 November 2021	12 (1930^{3}, 1950^{3}, 1954^{3}, 1958^{3}, 1962^{3}, 1974^{3}, 1982^{3}, 1990^{3}, 1998^{3}, 2006^{3}, 2010, 2018)
England	Group I winners	15 November 2021	15 (1950, 1954, 1958, 1962, **1966**, 1970, 1982, 1986, 1990, 1998, 2002, 2006, 2010, 2014, 2018)
Switzerland	Group C winners	15 November 2021	11 (1934, 1938, 1950, 1954, 1962, 1966, 1994, 2006, 2010, 2014, 2018)
Netherlands	Group G winners	16 November 2021	10 (1934, 1938, 1974, 1978, 1990, 1994, 1998, 2006, 2010, 2014)
Portugal	Play-offs Path C winners	29 March 2022	7 (1966, 1986, 2002, 2006, 2010, 2014, 2018)
Poland	Play-offs Path B winners	29 March 2022	8 (1938, 1974, 1978, 1982, 1986, 2002, 2006, 2018)
Wales	Play-offs Path A winners	5 June 2022	1 (1958)

^{1} Bold indicates champions for that year. Italic indicates hosts for that year.
^{2} Competed as West Germany. A separate team for East Germany also participated in qualifications during this time, having only qualified in 1974.
^{3} From 1930 to 1998, Serbia competed as Yugoslavia, while in 2006 as Serbia and Montenegro.

== Top goalscorers ==
There were 781 goals scored in 258 matches, for an average of 3.03 goals per match.

12 goals

- (England national football team) Harry Kane
- (Netherlands national football team) Memphis Depay

9 goals

- (Poland national football team) Robert Lewandowski

8 goals

- (Israel national football team) Eran Zahavi
- (Serbia national football team) Aleksandar Mitrović

6 goals

- (Finland national football team) Teemu Pukki
- (France national football team) Antoine Griezmann
- (Israel national football team) Mu'nas Dabbur
- (Portugal national football team) Cristiano Ronaldo
- (Turkey national football team) Burak Yılmaz
- (Wales national football team) Gareth Bale

Below are full goalscorer lists for all groups and the play-off rounds:

- Group A
- Group B
- Group C
- Group D
- Group E
- Group F
- Group G
- Group H
- Group I
- Group J
- Play-offs
