= 2022 FIFA World Cup qualification – UEFA Group A =

The 2022 FIFA World Cup qualification UEFA Group A was one of the ten UEFA groups in the World Cup qualification tournament to decide which teams would qualify for the 2022 FIFA World Cup finals tournament in Qatar. Group A consisted of five teams: Azerbaijan, Luxembourg, Portugal, the Republic of Ireland and Serbia. The teams played against each other home-and-away in a round-robin format.

The group winners, Serbia, qualified directly for the World Cup finals, while the runners-up, Portugal, advanced to the second round (play-offs).

Qatar were partnered with the five-team group that does not contain a UEFA Nations League finalist, Group A, which enabled the 2022 FIFA World Cup hosts to play centralized friendlies against these countries on their "spare" match dates. However, these friendlies did not count in the qualifying group standings. Also, Qatar played their "home" matches in Europe in order to allow short travel times for their opponents.

== Standings ==
| Pos | Team | Pld | W | D | L | GF | GA | GD | Pts | Qualification | Serbia | Portugal | Ireland | Luxembourg | Azerbaijan |
|---|---|---|---|---|---|---|---|---|---|---|---|---|---|---|---|
| 1 | Serbia | 8 | 6 | 2 | 0 | 18 | 9 | +9 | 20 | Qualification for 2022 FIFA World Cup | — | 2–2 | 3–2 | 4–1 | 3–1 |
| 2 | Portugal | 8 | 5 | 2 | 1 | 17 | 6 | +11 | 17 | Advance to play-offs | 1–2 | — | 2–1 | 5–0 | 1–0 |
| 3 | Republic of Ireland | 8 | 2 | 3 | 3 | 11 | 8 | +3 | 9 | | 1–1 | 0–0 | — | 0–1 | 1–1 |
| 4 | Luxembourg | 8 | 3 | 0 | 5 | 8 | 18 | −10 | 9 | | 0–1 | 1–3 | 0–3 | — | 2–1 |
| 5 | Azerbaijan | 8 | 0 | 1 | 7 | 5 | 18 | −13 | 1 | | 1–2 | 0–3 | 0–3 | 1–3 | — |

Source: FIFA, UEFA
Rules for classification: Tiebreakers

== Matches ==
The fixture list was confirmed by UEFA on 8 December 2020, the day following the draw. Times are CET/CEST, (Note: CET (UTC+1) for matches until 27 March and from 31 October (matchday 1–2 and 9–10), and CEST (UTC+2) for matches from 28 March to 30 October 2021 (matchday 3–8).) as listed by UEFA (local times, if different, are in parentheses).

24 March 2021
20:45

| Portugal | 1–0 | Azerbaijan |
|---|---|---|
| Medvedev 36' (o.g.) | Report (FIFA); Report (UEFA) |

Juventus Stadium, Turin (Italy)
Attendance: 0 (Note: Due to the COVID-19 pandemic in Europe, the match was played behind closed doors.)
Referee: Daniel Siebert (Germany)
24 March 2021
20:45

| Serbia | 3–2 | Republic of Ireland |
|---|---|---|
| Vlahović 40'; A. Mitrović 69', 75' | Report (FIFA); Report (UEFA) | Browne 18'; Collins 86' |

Red Star Stadium, Belgrade
Attendance: 0
Referee: Davide Massa (Italy)

27 March 2021
20:45 (19:45 UTC±0)

| Republic of Ireland | 0–1 | Luxembourg |
|---|---|---|
| | Report (FIFA); Report (UEFA) | Rodrigues 85' |

Aviva Stadium, Dublin
Attendance: 0
Referee: Fran Jović (Croatia)
27 March 2021
20:45

| Serbia | 2–2 | Portugal |
|---|---|---|
| A. Mitrović 46'; Kostić 60' | Report (FIFA); Report (UEFA) | Jota 11', 36' |

Red Star Stadium, Belgrade
Attendance: 0
Referee: Danny Makkelie (Netherlands)

30 March 2021
18:00 (20:00 UTC+4)

| Azerbaijan | 1–2 | Serbia |
|---|---|---|
| Mahmudov 59' (pen.) | Report (FIFA); Report (UEFA) | A. Mitrović 16', 81' |

Baku Olympic Stadium, Baku
Attendance: 0
Referee: Roi Reinshreiber (Israel)
30 March 2021
20:45

| Luxembourg | 1–3 | Portugal |
|---|---|---|
| Rodrigues 30' | Report (FIFA); Report (UEFA) | Jota 45+2'; Ronaldo 51'; Palhinha 80' |

Stade Josy Barthel, Luxembourg City
Attendance: 0
Referee: Sergey Ivanov (Russia)

1 September 2021
20:45

| Luxembourg | 2–1 | Azerbaijan |
|---|---|---|
| Pinto 8'; Rodrigues 28' (pen.) | Report (FIFA); Report (UEFA) | Mahmudov 67' |

Stade de Luxembourg, Luxembourg City
Attendance: 2,000
Referee: Irfan Peljto (Bosnia and Herzegovina)
1 September 2021
20:45 (19:45 UTC+1)

| Portugal | 2–1 | Republic of Ireland |
|---|---|---|
| Ronaldo 89', 90+6' | Report (FIFA); Report (UEFA) | Egan 45' |

Estádio Algarve, Faro/Loulé
Attendance: 7,831
Referee: Matej Jug (Slovenia)

4 September 2021
18:00 (17:00 UTC+1)

| Republic of Ireland | 1–1 | Azerbaijan |
|---|---|---|
| Duffy 87' | Report (FIFA); Report (UEFA) | Mahmudov 45+1' |

Aviva Stadium, Dublin
Attendance: 21,287
Referee: Jérôme Brisard (France)
4 September 2021
18:00

| Serbia | 4–1 | Luxembourg |
|---|---|---|
| A. Mitrović 22', 35'; Chanot 82' (o.g.); Milenković 90+6' | Report (FIFA); Report (UEFA) | O. Thill 77' |

Red Star Stadium, Belgrade
Attendance: 10,078
Referee: Halil Umut Meler (Turkey)

7 September 2021
18:00 (20:00 UTC+4)

| Azerbaijan | 0–3 | Portugal |
|---|---|---|
| | Report (FIFA); Report (UEFA) | B. Silva 26'; A. Silva 31'; Jota 75' |

Baku Olympic Stadium, Baku
Attendance: 20,574
Referee: Marco Guida (Italy)
7 September 2021
20:45 (19:45 UTC+1)

| Republic of Ireland | 1–1 | Serbia |
|---|---|---|
| Milenković 87' (o.g.) | Report (FIFA); Report (UEFA) | Milinković-Savić 20' |

Aviva Stadium, Dublin
Attendance: 25,415
Referee: José María Sánchez (Spain)

9 October 2021
18:00 (20:00 UTC+4)

| Azerbaijan | 0–3 | Republic of Ireland |
|---|---|---|
| | Report (FIFA); Report (UEFA) | Robinson 7', 39'; Ogbene 90' |

Baku Olympic Stadium, Baku
Attendance: 6,852
Referee: Espen Eskås (Norway)
9 October 2021
20:45

| Luxembourg | 0–1 | Serbia |
|---|---|---|
| | Report (FIFA); Report (UEFA) | Vlahović 68' |

Stade de Luxembourg, Luxembourg City
Attendance: 2,000
Referee: Willie Collum (Scotland)

12 October 2021
20:45 (19:45 UTC+1)

| Portugal | 5–0 | Luxembourg |
|---|---|---|
| Ronaldo 8' (pen.), 13' (pen.), 87'; Fernandes 18'; Palhinha 69' | Report (FIFA); Report (UEFA) |

Estádio Algarve, Faro/Loulé
Attendance: 18,553
Referee: Benoît Bastien (France)
12 October 2021
20:45

| Serbia | 3–1 | Azerbaijan |
|---|---|---|
| Vlahović 30' (pen.), 53'; Tadić 83' (pen.) | Report (FIFA); Report (UEFA) | Mahmudov 45+2' |

Red Star Stadium, Belgrade
Attendance: 5,890
Referee: Erik Lambrechts (Belgium)

11 November 2021
18:00 (21:00 UTC+4)

| Azerbaijan | 1–3 | Luxembourg |
|---|---|---|
| Salahli 82' | Report (FIFA); Report (UEFA) | Rodrigues 67', 90+1'; S. Thill 78' |

Baku Olympic Stadium, Baku
Attendance: 2,986
Referee: Manuel Schüttengruber (Austria)
11 November 2021
20:45 (19:45 UTC±0)

| Republic of Ireland | 0–0 | Portugal |
|---|---|---|
| | Report (FIFA); Report (UEFA) |

Aviva Stadium, Dublin
Attendance: 50,373
Referee: Jesús Gil Manzano (Spain)

14 November 2021
20:45

| Luxembourg | 0–3 | Republic of Ireland |
|---|---|---|
| | Report (FIFA); Report (UEFA) | Duffy 67'; Ogbene 75'; Robinson 88' |

Stade de Luxembourg, Luxembourg City
Attendance: 9,268
Referee: Tamás Bognár (Hungary)
14 November 2021
20:45 (19:45 UTC±0)

| Portugal | 1–2 | Serbia |
|---|---|---|
| Sanches 2' | Report (FIFA); Report (UEFA) | Tadić 33'; A. Mitrović 90' |

Estádio da Luz, Lisbon
Attendance: 58,873
Referee: Daniele Orsato (Italy)

== Goalscorers ==
There were 59 goals scored in 20 matches, for an average of 2.95 goals per match.

8 goals

- (Serbia national football team) Aleksandar Mitrović

6 goals

- (Portugal national football team) Cristiano Ronaldo

5 goals

- (Luxembourg national football team) Gerson Rodrigues

4 goals

- (Azerbaijan national football team) Emin Mahmudov
- (Portugal national football team) Diogo Jota
- (Serbia national football team) Dušan Vlahović

3 goals

- (Republic of Ireland national football team) Callum Robinson

2 goals

- (Portugal national football team) João Palhinha
- (Republic of Ireland national football team) Shane Duffy
- (Republic of Ireland national football team) Chiedozie Ogbene
- (Serbia national football team) Dušan Tadić

1 goal

- (Azerbaijan national football team) Azer Salahli
- (Luxembourg national football team) Mica Pinto
- (Luxembourg national football team) Olivier Thill
- (Luxembourg national football team) Sébastien Thill
- (Portugal national football team) Bruno Fernandes
- (Portugal national football team) Renato Sanches
- (Portugal national football team) André Silva
- (Portugal national football team) Bernardo Silva
- (Republic of Ireland national football team) Alan Browne
- (Republic of Ireland national football team) James Collins
- (Republic of Ireland national football team) John Egan
- (Serbia national football team) Filip Kostić
- (Serbia national football team) Nikola Milenković
- (Serbia national football team) Sergej Milinković-Savić

1 own goal

- (Azerbaijan national football team) Maksim Medvedev (against Portugal)
- (Luxembourg national football team) Maxime Chanot (against Serbia)
- (Serbia national football team) Nikola Milenković (against Republic of Ireland)

== Discipline ==
A player was automatically suspended for the next match for the following offences:

- Receiving a red card (red card suspensions could be extended for serious offences)
- Receiving two yellow cards in two different matches (yellow card suspensions were carried forward to the play-offs, but not the finals or any other future international matches)

The following suspensions were served during the qualifying matches:

| Team | Player | Offence(s) | Suspended for match(es) |
|---|---|---|---|
| Azerbaijan | Hojjat Haghverdi | (yellow card) vs Portugal (7 September 2021); (yellow card) vs Serbia (12 October 2021) | vs Luxembourg (11 November 2021) |
| Azerbaijan | Anton Krivotsyuk | (yellow card) vs Luxembourg (1 September 2021); (yellow card) vs Republic of Ireland (4 September 2021) | vs Portugal (7 September 2021) |
| Luxembourg | Dirk Carlson | (yellow card) vs Serbia (9 October 2021); (yellow card) vs Azerbaijan (11 November 2021) | vs Republic of Ireland (14 November 2021) |
| Luxembourg | Maxime Chanot | (yellow card) (yellow-red card) vs Portugal (30 March 2021) | vs Azerbaijan (1 September 2021) |
| Luxembourg | Christopher Martins | (yellow card) vs Azerbaijan (1 September 2021); (yellow card) vs Serbia (4 September 2021) | vs Serbia (9 October 2021) |
| Luxembourg | Gerson Rodrigues | (yellow card) (yellow-red card) vs Serbia (4 September 2021) | vs Serbia (9 October 2021) |
| Portugal | Bruno Fernandes | (yellow card) vs Azerbaijan (24 March 2021); (yellow card) vs Serbia (27 March 2021) | vs Luxembourg (30 March 2021) |
| Portugal | Nuno Mendes | (yellow card) vs Azerbaijan (7 September 2021); (yellow card) vs Luxembourg (12 October 2021) | vs Republic of Ireland (11 November 2021) |
| Portugal | Pepe | (yellow card) (yellow-red card) vs Republic of Ireland (11 November 2021) | vs Serbia (14 November 2021) |
| Portugal | Cristiano Ronaldo | (yellow card) vs Serbia (27 March 2021); (yellow card) vs Republic of Ireland (1 September 2021) | vs Azerbaijan (7 September 2021) |
| Serbia | Filip Đuričić | (yellow card) vs Republic of Ireland (7 September 2021); (yellow card) vs Luxembourg (9 October 2021) | vs Azerbaijan (12 October 2021) |
| Serbia | Nikola Milenković | (red card) vs Portugal (27 March 2021) | vs Azerbaijan (30 March 2021) |
| Serbia | Strahinja Pavlović | (yellow card) vs Republic of Ireland (24 March 2021); (yellow card) vs Luxembourg (9 October 2021) | vs Azerbaijan (12 October 2021) |
| Republic of Ireland | Alan Browne | (yellow card) vs Azerbaijan (4 September 2021); (yellow card) vs Serbia (7 September 2021) | vs Azerbaijan (9 October 2021) |
| Republic of Ireland | Jayson Molumby | (yellow card) vs Azerbaijan (4 September 2021); (yellow card) vs Serbia (7 September 2021) | vs Azerbaijan (9 October 2021) |
