= Baku Olympic Stadium =

Sports stadium in Baku, Azerbaijan

Coordinates: 40.4298°N 49.9198°E

Baku Olympic Stadium Bakı Olimpiya Stadionu
- UEFA Category 4 Stadium

- Exterior view of stadium at night
- Interactive map of Baku Olympic Stadium; Bakı Olimpiya Stadionu
- Location: Baku, Azerbaijan
- Owner: Association of Football Federations of Azerbaijan
- Capacity: 69,870
- Surface: GrassMaster
- Record attendance: 67,200 (Qarabağ 1–2 Roma, 27 September 2017)
- Public transit: Koroğlu

Construction
- Groundbreaking: 6 June 2011; 15 years ago
- Built: 2011–2015
- Opened: 6 March 2015; 11 years ago
- Architects: TOCA (Concept Design), Heerim, ROSSETTI (Sports Architect)
- Structural engineer: Thornton Tomasetti
- General contractors: Tekfen Construction, Turkey

Tenants
- Azerbaijan national football team Qarabağ FK, Sabah FK (European matches)

Baku Olympic Stadium (Azerbaijani: Bakı Olimpiya Stadionu) is a stadium, designed and constructed to meet the international standards for stadiums set by the Union of European Football Associations (UEFA), the International Federation of Association Football (FIFA) and the World Athletics. Having seating capacity for 69,870 people, it is the largest stadium in Azerbaijan. Despite the name, it has never hosted and is not scheduled to host any competition of the Olympic Games.

Construction of the 205,000-square-metre (2,210,000 sq ft) stadium on a 500,000-square-metre (5,380,000 sq ft) site was completed in February 2015. The six-storey, 60-metre (197 ft) structure near Boyukshor Lake, Baku, Azerbaijan, opened on 6 March 2015. The main tenant of the stadium is Azerbaijan's national football team, who moved from their previous home at the Tofiq Bahramov Republican Stadium. In June 2015, the stadium served as the main venue for the 2015 European Games, hosting the opening and closing ceremonies and the athletic games. The venue hosted the opening match of the UEFA European Under-17 Championship in 2016, the final match of 2018–19 UEFA Europa League, three group games and a quarterfinal at the UEFA Euro 2020, the Baku concert of Mercury World Tour, and the 2024 United Nations Climate Change Conference (COP29). A green area is being developed around the stadium, which is accessible via public transport.

== History ==
=== The foundation ceremony ===
The foundation of the Baku Olympic Stadium was laid on 6 June 2011 in a ceremony to mark the 100th anniversary of Azerbaijani football.

The ceremony was attended by the President of Azerbaijan Ilham Aliyev and his spouse Mehriban Aliyeva, FIFA president Sepp Blatter, UEFA president Michel Platini, prominent members of the global football community, heads of various federations, football veterans and other guests. Azerbaijani President Ilham Aliyev was informed about the future plans for the construction of the stadium. Speaking at the ceremony, Blatter said:

"This is really beautiful, grand building, and more than 60 thousand football fans coming to the stadium will be able to enjoy football."

Aliyev then placed a symbolic metal capsule inside a football. His son Heydar, scoring a goal in a symbolic gate, dropped the ball into the foundation. Presidents Aliyev with Blatter and Platini, operated a switch starting the concrete pour, and signed a football, which was preserved in memory of the ceremony.

=== Construction ===
Despite the groundbreaking ceremony taking place in 2011, the construction of the stadium started only in November 2012 with the excavation and backfilling of the stadium area.

The stadium was completed on 28 February 2015, and the opening took place on 6 March 2015. President Aliyev participated in the opening ceremony.

The total layout of the stadium covers 617,000-square-metre (6,640,000 sq ft) and has a capacity for 68,700 people. It is six stories tall.

Baku was ready to host the first European Games in 2015.

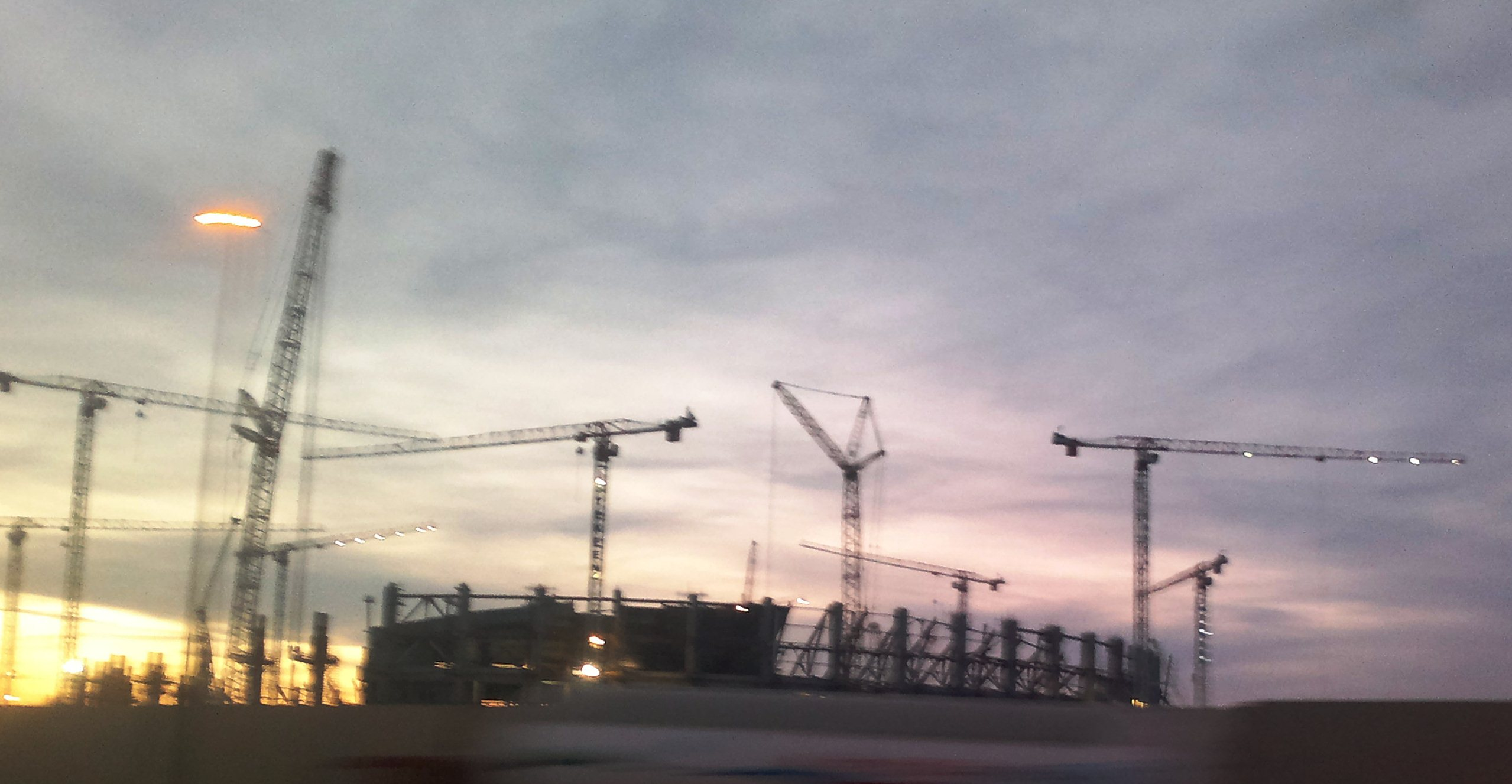
Construction of the stadium in Baku

The project was funded by the SOCAR. The Turkish company Tekfen Construction and Installation Co., Inc, was given a design-and-build contract.

Along with the stadium, a number of hotels, a parking venue with 3,617 parking spaces, and 81,574 square metres (878,055 sq ft) of green space were built.

== Events ==
The stadium hosted athletics and the opening and closing ceremonies during 2015 European Games.

Baku Olympic Stadium hosted the 2024 United Nations Climate Change Conference (COP29) from 11 to 24 November 2024.

In 2016, opening match of UEFA European Under-17 Championship also took place here.

In 2017 Baku Olympic Stadium became one of the home stadiums for Qarabag FK. Thus, Qarabağ FK played UEFA Champions League group stage matches in the 2017–18 UEFA Champions League at the stadium, group stage matches of the 2018–19 UEFA Europa League, and a first group stage match of 2021–22 UEFA Europa Conference League against FC Basel.

The stadium hosted the 2019 UEFA Europa League Final on 29 May 2019.

On 2 September 2023, Imagine Dragons took the stage at Baku Olympic Stadium for the first time. The concert was part of the Mercury World Tour.

From 11 to 24 November 2024, Baku Olympic Stadium hosted the 2024 United Nations Climate Change Conference (COP29).

== Azerbaijan national football team matches ==
The following national team matches were held in the stadium.

Date	Time (CEST)	Team #1	Res.	Team #2	Round	Attendance
10 October 2015	18:00	Azerbaijan	1–3	Italy	UEFA Euro 2016 qualifying	48,000
8 October 2016	18:00	Azerbaijan	1–0	Norway	2018 FIFA World Cup qualifying	35,000
5 October 2017	18:00	Azerbaijan	1–2	Czech Republic	2018 FIFA World Cup qualifying	16,200
30 March 2021	18:00	Azerbaijan	1–2	Serbia	2022 FIFA World Cup qualifying	0
7 September 2021	18:00	Azerbaijan	0–3	Portugal	2022 FIFA World Cup qualifying	20,574
9 October 2021	18:00	Azerbaijan	0–3	Republic of Ireland	2022 FIFA World Cup qualifying	6,852
11 November 2021	18:00	Azerbaijan	1–3	Luxembourg	2022 FIFA World Cup qualifying	2,986

== UEFA Euro 2020 ==
The stadium hosted three group stage matches and one quarter-final's match at the UEFA Euro 2020, which was postponed to 2021 due to the COVID-19 pandemic in Europe.

Date	Team #1	Result	Team #2	Round	Attendance
12 June 2021	Wales	1–1	Switzerland	Group A	8,782
16 June 2021	Turkey	0–2	Wales	Group A	19,762
20 June 2021	Switzerland	3–1	Turkey	Group A	17,138
3 July 2021	Czech Republic	1–2	Denmark	Quarter-finals	16,306

== Notable matches ==
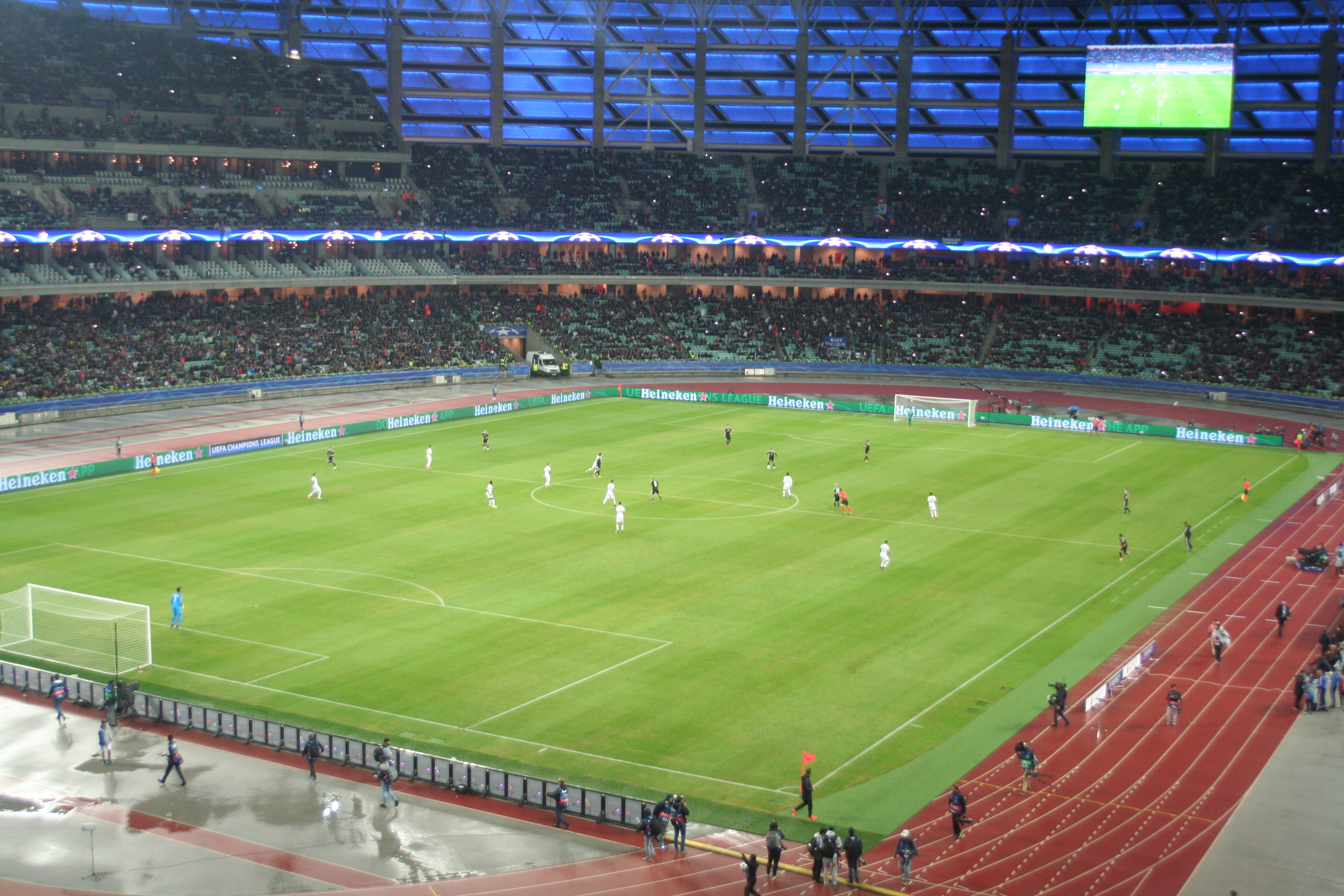
Qarabağ playing against Roma at Baku Olympic Stadium during the 2017–18 UEFA Champions League.

Date		Result		Competition	Attendance
27 September 2017	(Azerbaijan) Qarabağ	1–2	(Italy) Roma	UEFA Champions League group stage	67,200
18 October 2017	(Azerbaijan) Qarabağ	0–0	(Spain) Atlético Madrid	UEFA Champions League group stage	47,923
22 November 2017	(Azerbaijan) Qarabağ	0–4	(England) Chelsea	UEFA Champions League group stage	67,100
4 October 2018	(Azerbaijan) Qarabağ	0–3	(England) Arsenal	UEFA Europa League group stage	63,412
29 May 2019	(England) Chelsea	4–1	(England) Arsenal	UEFA Europa League Final	51,370

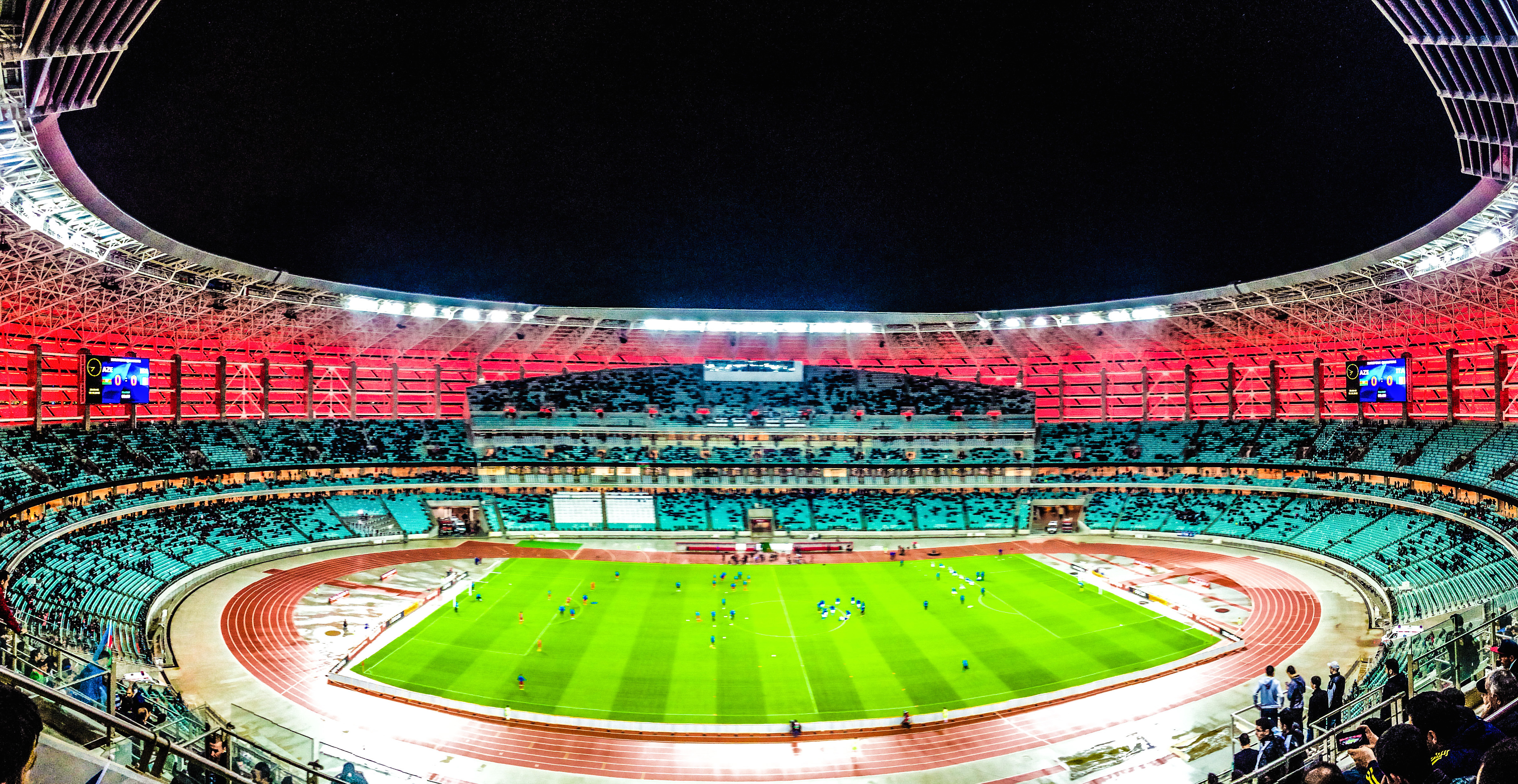
Inside Baku Olympic Stadium, 10 October 2015.

== See also ==
- List of football stadiums in Azerbaijan
- List of European stadiums by capacity
- Lists of stadiums

Preceded by Parc Olympique Lyonnais; Lyon	UEFA Europa League; Final venue 2019	Succeeded by RheinEnergieStadion; Cologne
