= 2022 FIFA World Cup qualification – UEFA Group B =

The 2022 FIFA World Cup qualification UEFA Group B was one of the ten UEFA groups in the World Cup qualification tournament to decide which teams would qualify for the 2022 FIFA World Cup finals tournament in Qatar. Group B consisted of five teams: Georgia, Greece, Kosovo, Spain and Sweden. The teams played against each other home-and-away in a round-robin format.

The group winners, Spain, qualified directly for the World Cup finals, while the runners-up, Sweden, advanced to the second round (play-offs).

Greece, Georgia and Spain did not recognize Kosovo as an independent country, and therefore, during the match between Spain and Kosovo, the latter team was named "Kosovo Football Federation".

== Standings ==
Pos	Team	Pld	W	D	L	GF	GA	GD	Pts	Qualification	Spain	Sweden	Greece	Georgia	Kosovo
1	Spain	8	6	1	1	15	5	+10	19	Qualification for 2022 FIFA World Cup	—	1–0	1–1	4–0	3–1
2	Sweden	8	5	0	3	12	6	+6	15	Advance to play-offs	2–1	—	2–0	1–0	3–0
3	Greece	8	2	4	2	8	8	0	10		0–1	2–1	—	1–1	1–1
4	Georgia	8	2	1	5	6	12	−6	7		1–2	2–0	0–2	—	0–1
5	Kosovo	8	1	2	5	5	15	−10	5		0–2	0–3	1–1	1–2	—

Source: FIFA, UEFA
Rules for classification: Tiebreakers

== Matches ==
The fixture list was confirmed by UEFA on 8 December 2020, the day following the draw. Times are CET/CEST, (Note: CET (UTC+1) for matches until 27 March and from 31 October (matchday 1 and 9–10), and CEST (UTC+2) for matches from 28 March to 30 October 2021 (matchday 2–8).) as listed by UEFA (local times, if different, are in parentheses).

25 March 2021
20:45

Spain	1–1	Greece
Morata 33'	Report (FIFA); Report (UEFA)	Bakasetas 57' (pen.)

Nuevo Los Cármenes, Granada
Attendance: 0 (Note: Due to the COVID-19 pandemic in Europe, the match was played behind closed doors.)
Referee: Marco Guida (Italy)
25 March 2021
20:45

Sweden	1–0	Georgia
Claesson 35'	Report (FIFA); Report (UEFA)

Friends Arena, Solna
Attendance: 0
Referee: Benoît Bastien (France)

28 March 2021
18:00 (20:00 UTC+4)

Georgia	1–2	Spain
Kvaratskhelia 44'	Report (FIFA); Report (UEFA)	Torres 56'; Olmo 90+2'

Boris Paichadze Dinamo Arena, Tbilisi
Attendance: 16,500
Referee: Radu Petrescu (Romania)
28 March 2021
20:45

Kosovo	0–3	Sweden
	Report (FIFA); Report (UEFA)	Augustinsson 12'; Isak 35'; Larsson 70' (pen.)

Fadil Vokrri Stadium, Pristina
Attendance: 0
Referee: Tamás Bognár (Hungary)

31 March 2021
20:45 (21:45 UTC+3)

Greece	1–1	Georgia
Kakabadze 76' (o.g.)	Report (FIFA); Report (UEFA)	Kvaratskhelia 78'

Toumba Stadium, Thessaloniki
Attendance: 0
Referee: Szymon Marciniak (Poland)
31 March 2021
20:45

Spain	3–1	Kosovo
Olmo 34'; Torres 36'; Gerard 75'	Report (FIFA); Report (UEFA)	Halimi 70'

La Cartuja, Seville
Attendance: 0
Referee: Jakob Kehlet (Denmark)

2 September 2021
18:00 (20:00 UTC+4)

Georgia	0–1	Kosovo
	Report (FIFA); Report (UEFA)	Muriqi 18'

Batumi Stadium, Batumi
Attendance: 122
Referee: Mykola Balakin (Ukraine)
2 September 2021
20:45

Sweden	2–1	Spain
Isak 6'; Claesson 57'	Report (FIFA); Report (UEFA)	Soler 5'

Friends Arena, Solna
Attendance: 16,901
Referee: Anthony Taylor (England)

5 September 2021
20:45

Kosovo	1–1	Greece
Muriqi 90+2'	Report (FIFA); Report (UEFA)	Douvikas 45+1'

Fadil Vokrri Stadium, Pristina
Attendance: 1,200
Referee: François Letexier (France)
5 September 2021
20:45

Spain	4–0	Georgia
Gayà 14'; Soler 25'; Torres 41'; Sarabia 63'	Report (FIFA); Report (UEFA)

Nuevo Vivero, Badajoz
Attendance: 8,444
Referee: Tiago Martins (Portugal)

8 September 2021
20:45 (21:45 UTC+3)

Greece	2–1	Sweden
Bakasetas 62'; Pavlidis 78'	Report (FIFA); Report (UEFA)	Quaison 80'

Olympic Stadium, Athens
Attendance: 3,475
Referee: Sergei Karasev (Russia)
8 September 2021
20:45

Kosovo	0–2	Spain
	Report (FIFA); Report (UEFA)	Fornals 32'; Torres 90'

Fadil Vokrri Stadium, Pristina
Attendance: 1,200
Referee: Bobby Madden (Scotland)

9 October 2021
18:00 (20:00 UTC+4)

Georgia	0–2	Greece
	Report (FIFA); Report (UEFA)	Bakasetas 90' (pen.); Pelkas 90+5'

Batumi Stadium, Batumi
Attendance: 0 (Note: The match was played behind closed doors.)
Referee: Donatas Rumšas (Lithuania)
9 October 2021
18:00

Sweden	3–0	Kosovo
Forsberg 29' (pen.); Isak 62'; Quaison 79'	Report (FIFA); Report (UEFA)

Friends Arena, Solna
Attendance: 44,213
Referee: Marco Di Bello (Italy)

12 October 2021
20:45

Kosovo	1–2	Georgia
Muriqi 45' (pen.)	Report (FIFA); Report (UEFA)	Okriashvili 11'; Davitashvili 82'

Fadil Vokrri Stadium, Pristina
Attendance: 3,550
Referee: Paweł Raczkowski (Poland)
12 October 2021
20:45

Sweden	2–0	Greece
Forsberg 59' (pen.); Isak 69'	Report (FIFA); Report (UEFA)

Friends Arena, Solna
Attendance: 47,314
Referee: Tobias Stieler (Germany)

11 November 2021
18:00 (21:00 UTC+4)

Georgia	2–0	Sweden
Kvaratskhelia 61', 77'	Report (FIFA); Report (UEFA)

Batumi Stadium, Batumi
Attendance: 6,800
Referee: Serdar Gözübüyük (Netherlands)
11 November 2021
20:45 (21:45 UTC+2)

Greece	0–1	Spain
	Report (FIFA); Report (UEFA)	Sarabia 26' (pen.)

Olympic Stadium, Athens
Attendance: 7,825
Referee: Szymon Marciniak (Poland)

14 November 2021
20:45 (21:45 UTC+2)

Greece	1–1	Kosovo
Masouras 44'	Report (FIFA); Report (UEFA)	Rrahmani 76'

Olympic Stadium, Athens
Attendance: 1,388
Referee: Aleksei Kulbakov (Belarus)
14 November 2021
20:45

Spain	1–0	Sweden
Morata 86'	Report (FIFA); Report (UEFA)

La Cartuja, Seville
Attendance: 51,844
Referee: Felix Brych (Germany)

== Goalscorers ==
There were 46 goals scored in 20 matches, for an average of 2.3 goals per match.

4 goals

- (Georgia national football team) Khvicha Kvaratskhelia
- (Spain national football team) Ferran Torres
- (Sweden men's national football team) Alexander Isak

3 goals

- (Greece national football team) Anastasios Bakasetas
- (Kosovo national football team) Vedat Muriqi

2 goals

- (Spain national football team) Álvaro Morata
- (Spain national football team) Dani Olmo
- (Spain national football team) Pablo Sarabia
- (Spain national football team) Carlos Soler
- (Sweden men's national football team) Viktor Claesson
- (Sweden men's national football team) Emil Forsberg
- (Sweden men's national football team) Robin Quaison

1 goal

- (Georgia national football team) Zuriko Davitashvili
- (Georgia national football team) Tornike Okriashvili
- (Greece national football team) Anastasios Douvikas
- (Greece national football team) Georgios Masouras
- (Greece national football team) Vangelis Pavlidis
- (Greece national football team) Dimitrios Pelkas
- (Kosovo national football team) Besar Halimi
- (Kosovo national football team) Amir Rrahmani
- (Spain national football team) Pablo Fornals
- (Spain national football team) José Gayà
- (Spain national football team) Gerard Moreno
- (Sweden men's national football team) Ludwig Augustinsson
- (Sweden men's national football team) Sebastian Larsson

1 own goal

- (Georgia national football team) Otar Kakabadze (against Greece)

== Discipline ==
A player was automatically suspended for the next match for the following offences:

- Receiving a red card (red card suspensions could be extended for serious offences)
- Receiving two yellow cards in two different matches (yellow card suspensions were carried forward to the play-offs, but not the finals or any other future international matches)

The following suspensions were served during the qualifying matches:

Team	Player	Offence(s)	Suspended for match(es)
Georgia	Giorgi Aburjania	(yellow card) vs Greece (31 March 2021); (yellow card) vs Greece (9 October 2021)	vs Kosovo (12 October 2021)
Georgia	Grigol Chabradze	(yellow card) vs Kosovo (2 September 2021); (yellow card) vs Spain (5 September 2021)	vs Greece (9 October 2021)
Georgia	Lasha Dvali	(yellow card) vs Sweden (25 March 2021); (yellow card) vs Kosovo (12 October 2021)	vs Sweden (11 November 2021)
Georgia	Guram Giorbelidze	(yellow card) vs Greece (9 October 2021); (yellow card) vs Kosovo (12 October 2021)	vs Sweden (11 November 2021)
Georgia	Jaba Kankava	(yellow card) vs Greece (31 March 2021); (yellow card) vs Greece (9 October 2021)	vs Kosovo (12 October 2021)
Georgia	Guram Kashia	(yellow card) vs Kosovo (2 September 2021); (yellow card) vs Spain (5 September 2021)	vs Greece (9 October 2021)
Georgia	Levan Shengelia	(red card) vs Spain (28 March 2021)	vs Greece (31 March 2021) vs Kosovo (2 September 2021)
Greece	Anastasios Bakasetas	(yellow card) vs Georgia (9 October 2021); (yellow card) vs Sweden (12 October 2021)	vs Spain (11 November 2021)
Greece	Pantelis Chatzidiakos	(red card) vs Slovenia in 2020–21 UEFA Nations League (18 November 2020)	vs Spain (25 March 2021)
Greece	Pantelis Chatzidiakos	(yellow card) (yellow-red card) vs Sweden (12 October 2021)	vs Spain (11 November 2021)
Greece	Giorgos Giakoumakis	(yellow card) vs Spain (25 March 2021); (yellow card) vs Georgia (31 March 2021)	vs Kosovo (5 September 2021)
Greece	Manolis Siopis	(yellow card) vs Georgia (9 October 2021); (yellow card) vs Spain (11 November 2021)	vs Kosovo (14 November 2021)
Greece	Georgios Tzavellas	(yellow card) vs Kosovo (5 September 2021); (yellow card) vs Georgia (9 October 2021)	vs Sweden (12 October 2021)
Greece	Zeca	(yellow card) vs Spain (25 March 2021); (yellow card) vs Georgia (31 March 2021)	vs Kosovo (5 September 2021)
Kosovo	Bernard Berisha	(yellow card) (yellow-red card) vs Sweden (28 March 2021)	vs Spain (31 March 2021)
Kosovo	Ibrahim Drešević	(red card) vs Moldova in 2020–21 UEFA Nations League (18 November 2020)	vs Sweden (28 March 2021)
Kosovo	Ibrahim Drešević	(yellow card) vs Sweden (9 October 2021); (yellow card) vs Georgia (12 October 2021)	vs Greece (14 November 2021)
Kosovo	Florent Hadergjonaj	(yellow card) vs Sweden (28 March 2021); (yellow card) vs Sweden (9 October 2021)	vs Georgia (12 October 2021)
Kosovo	Besar Halimi	(yellow card) vs Sweden (28 March 2021); (yellow card) vs Greece (5 September 2021)	vs Spain (8 September 2021)
Kosovo	Lirim M. Kastrati	(yellow card) vs Georgia (2 September 2021); (yellow card) vs Greece (5 September 2021)	vs Spain (8 September 2021)
Kosovo	Hekuran Kryeziu	(yellow card) vs Sweden (28 March 2021); (yellow card) vs Spain (31 March 2021)	vs Georgia (2 September 2021)
Sweden	Marcus Danielson	(red card) vs Ukraine in UEFA Euro 2020 (29 June 2021)	vs Spain (2 September 2021)
Sweden	Albin Ekdal	(yellow card) vs Kosovo (9 October 2021); (yellow card) vs Greece (12 October 2021)	vs Georgia (11 November 2021)
Sweden	Dejan Kulusevski	(yellow card) vs Spain (2 September 2021); (yellow card) vs Kosovo (9 October 2021)	vs Greece (12 October 2021)
