= 2022 FIFA World Cup qualification – UEFA second round =

The second round of the qualification tournament for the 2022 FIFA World Cup from UEFA (also known as the UEFA play-offs) was contested by twelve teams from the UEFA segment of qualifying. The play-offs determined the final three European teams that joined the group winners at the World Cup in Qatar. The ten runners-up from the UEFA first round groups participated in the play-offs, along with two group winners from the 2020–21 UEFA Nations League. The teams were divided into three paths, each containing four teams, with each play-off path featuring two single-leg semi-finals, and one single-leg final. The matches took place in March and June 2022.

Wales, Poland and Portugal qualified for the final tournament.

== Format ==
The qualification format was confirmed by the UEFA Executive Committee during their meeting in Nyon, Switzerland on 4 December 2019. The play-offs depended, in part, on results from the 2020–21 UEFA Nations League, although to a lesser degree than play-offs of the UEFA Euro 2020 qualifying tournament.

Unlike previous editions, the play-offs were not contested in two-legged ties. Instead, the twelve teams were split into three play-off paths, each containing four teams. Each play-off path was planned to feature two single-leg semi-finals on 24 March, and one single-leg final on 29 March 2022. The winners of the final in each play-off path qualified for the 2022 FIFA World Cup in Qatar. The semi-finals were hosted by the six best-ranked runners-up of the qualifying group stage, while the host of the final was determined by a draw.

The play-offs were played in single-leg knockout matches. If scores were level at the end of normal time, 30 minutes of extra time would be played, where each team was allowed to make a sixth substitution. If the scores remained tied, a penalty shoot-out would be used to determine the winner. Following approval from the UEFA Executive Committee in December 2019, the use of the video assistant referee system was approved for the entire World Cup qualification tournament.

== Qualified teams ==
Twelve teams advanced to the play-offs. Unlike previous editions, all participants were not decided solely on the results of the first round. Two of the twelve spots were allocated to group winners of the 2020–21 edition of the UEFA Nations League.

=== Second-placed teams (all ten advanced) ===
The ten runners-up from the UEFA first round advanced to the play-offs. Based on the results from the qualifying group stage, the six best-ranked teams were seeded, while the bottom four were unseeded in the semi-final draw.

Seed	Grp	Team	Pld	W	D	L	GF	GA	GD	Pts	Seeding
1	A	Portugal	8	5	2	1	17	6	+11	17	Seeded in semi-final draw
2	F	Scotland	8	5	2	1	14	7	+7	17	Seeded in semi-final draw
3	C	Italy	8	4	4	0	13	2	+11	16	Seeded in semi-final draw
4	H	Russia	8	5	1	2	14	5	+9	16	Seeded in semi-final draw
5	B	Sweden	8	5	0	3	12	6	+6	15	Seeded in semi-final draw
6	E	Wales	8	4	3	1	14	9	+5	15	Seeded in semi-final draw
7	G	Turkey	8	4	3	1	18	16	+2	15	Unseeded in semi-final draw
8	I	Poland	8	4	2	2	18	10	+8	14	Unseeded in semi-final draw
9	J	North Macedonia	8	3	3	2	14	11	+3	12	Unseeded in semi-final draw
10	D	Ukraine	8	2	6	0	11	8	+3	12	Unseeded in semi-final draw

Source: FIFA, UEFA
Rules for classification: Counting only matches against teams ranked first to fifth in the group, 1. Points; 2. Goal difference; 3. Goals scored; 4. Away goals scored; 5. Wins; 6. Away wins; 7. Lower disciplinary points total; 8. Position in 2020–21 UEFA Nations League access list.

=== Nations League group winners (best two advanced) ===
Based on the 2020–21 UEFA Nations League overall ranking, the best two Nations League group winners that finished outside the top two of their qualifying group advanced to the play-offs and were unseeded in the semi-final draw.

UNL	Rank	UNL group winner	Qualifying group
A	1	France ^{&}	D
A	2	Spain ^{&}	B
A	3	Italy ^{†}	C
A	4	Belgium ^{&}	E
B	17	Wales ^{†}	E
B	18	Austria ^{‡}	F
B	19	Czech Republic ^{‡}	E
B	20	Hungary	I
C	33	Slovenia	H
C	34	Montenegro	G
C	35	Albania	I
C	36	Armenia	J
D	49	Gibraltar	G
D	50	Faroe Islands	F

Key

- & Team qualified directly for World Cup as qualifying group winner
- † Team advanced to the play-offs as qualifying group runner-up
- ‡ Team (in **bold**) advanced to the play-offs as one of the best two Nations League group winners outside top two of their qualifying group

== Draw ==
Following the completion of the UEFA first round, the twelve teams that advanced to the play-offs were drawn into three paths of four teams on 26 November 2021, 17:00 CET, in Zürich, Switzerland. The following procedure was applied in the draw:

- The six seeded teams were allocated to semi-finals 1 to 6 as the host team in the order drawn.
- The six unseeded teams were allocated to semi-finals 1 to 6 as the away team in the order drawn.
- Play-off Path A was formed by semi-finals 1 and 2, with the winners of both semi-finals advancing to final A.
- Play-off Path B was formed by semi-finals 3 and 4, with the winners of both semi-finals advancing to final B.
- Play-off Path C was formed by semi-finals 5 and 6, with the winners of both semi-finals advancing to final C.
- The semi-final winners that host play-off finals A, B and C were decided by a draw.

For political reasons related to the Russo-Ukrainian War, Russia and Ukraine could not be drawn into the same play-off path. Armenia / Azerbaijan, Gibraltar / Spain, Kosovo / Bosnia and Herzegovina, Kosovo / Serbia and Kosovo / Russia were also identified as prohibited clashes, but among these teams only Russia advanced to the play-offs.

The six runners-up with the best group stage performance were seeded in the semi-final draw, while the remaining four runners-up and two teams advancing via the Nations League were unseeded. The seedings were as follows:

Pot 1 (seeded)
Team	Rank
Portugal	1
Scotland	2
Italy	3
Russia	4
Sweden	5
Wales	6

Pot 2 (unseeded)
Team	Rank
Turkey	7
Poland	8
North Macedonia	9
Ukraine	10
Austria	NL–18
Czech Republic	NL–19

== Effects of the Russian invasion of Ukraine ==
FIFA and UEFA suspended Russia on 28 February, and announced on 8 March that their semi-final opponents Poland received a bye to the Path B final; a request by the Russian Football Union for a temporary lift of the ban was rejected by the Court of Arbitration for Sport on 18 March. An initial decision by FIFA on 27 February had ruled that Russia had to compete under the name "Football Union of Russia" (RFU) and without its flag or anthem, and play its home matches on neutral ground without spectators. By that point, the football associations of the other three teams in the Path (Czech Republic, Poland, and Sweden) had refused to play any matches against Russia, regardless of location, a stance to which they remained committed following FIFA's initial decision.

In Path A, following a request by the Ukrainian Association of Football, on 8 March, FIFA postponed the semi-final between Scotland and Ukraine until June 2022, along with the path final. In the interest of preventing further fixture congestion, the other semi-final match between Wales and Austria would go ahead as scheduled in March. The participation of the Ukrainian team despite the war in their home country was the subject of an ESPN E60 Edition "Remember the Blue & Yellow".

== Schedule ==
Four of the semi-final matches took place on 24 March, and two of the final matches on 29 March 2022. In Path A, one semi-final and the final were postponed to 1 and 5 June 2022, respectively, due to the Russian invasion of Ukraine. The kick-off times were confirmed on 26 November 2021 following the draw. As part of UEFA's scheduling, the losing semi-finalists of each path played a friendly match against each other on the day of the play-off finals.

Times are CET/CEST, (Note: CET (UTC+1) for the matches on 24 March, and CEST (UTC+2) for the matches on 29 March and in June 2022.) as listed by UEFA (local times, if different, are in parentheses).

== Path A ==
The winner of Path A, Wales, entered Group B in the final tournament.

=== Bracket ===
Semi-finals
24 March 2022 – Cardiff
Wales	2
Austria	1
1 June 2022 – Glasgow
Scotland	1
Ukraine	3

Final
5 June 2022 – Cardiff
Wales	1
Ukraine	0

=== Summary ===
Home team	Score	Away team
Semi-finals
Scotland	1–3	Ukraine
Wales	2–1	Austria
Final
Wales	1–0	Ukraine

=== Semi-finals ===
24 March 2022
20:45 (19:45 UTC±0)

Wales	2–1	Austria
Bale 25', 51'	Report (FIFA); Report (UEFA)	Sabitzer 65'

Cardiff City Stadium, Cardiff
Attendance: 32,053
Referee: Szymon Marciniak (Poland)

1 June 2022 (Note: The Scotland v Ukraine match, originally scheduled for 24 March 2022, 20:45 (19:45 UTC±0), was postponed to 1 June 2022, 20:45 (19:45 UTC+1), due to the Russian invasion of Ukraine.)
20:45 (19:45 UTC+1)

Scotland	1–3	Ukraine
McGregor 79'	Report (FIFA); Report (UEFA)	Yarmolenko 33'; Yaremchuk 49'; Dovbyk 90+5'

Hampden Park, Glasgow
Attendance: 49,772
Referee: Danny Makkelie (Netherlands)

=== Final ===
5 June 2022 (Note: The Path A final, originally scheduled for 29 March 2022, 20:45, was postponed to 5 June 2022, 18:00 (17:00 UTC+1), due to the postponement of the Scotland v Ukraine semi-final match.)
18:00 (17:00 UTC+1)

Wales	1–0	Ukraine
Bale 34' (Note: FIFA and UEFA initially awarded the goal as an own goal by Andriy Yarmolenko, but FIFA technical experts subsequently awarded the goal to Gareth Bale.)	Report (FIFA); Report (UEFA)

Cardiff City Stadium, Cardiff
Attendance: 32,660
Referee: Antonio Mateu Lahoz (Spain)

== Path B ==
The winner of Path B, Poland, entered Group C in the final tournament.

=== Bracket ===
Semi-finals
Cancelled
Russia
Poland (Note: Russia were suspended, and Poland advanced to the final on a walkover.)	w/o
24 March 2022 – Solna
Sweden (a.e.t.)	1
Czech Republic	0

Final
29 March 2022 – Chorzów
Poland	2
Sweden	0

=== Summary ===
Home team	Score	Away team
Semi-finals
Russia	w/o	Poland
Sweden	1–0 (a.e.t.)	Czech Republic
Final
Poland	2–0	Sweden

=== Semi-finals ===
24 March 2022
18:00 (20:00 UTC+3)

Russia	Cancelled	Poland
	Report (FIFA); Report (UEFA)

VTB Arena, Moscow (Note: The Russia v Poland match, originally scheduled to be played at Luzhniki Stadium, Moscow, was later moved on 2 February 2022 to VTB Arena, Moscow, due to the epidemiological situation in Moscow and the possible limitations associated with it.)

Poland advanced to the play-off final on walkover.

24 March 2022
20:45

Sweden	1–0 (a.e.t.)	Czech Republic
Quaison 110'	Report (FIFA); Report (UEFA)

Friends Arena, Solna
Attendance: 48,628
Referee: Michael Oliver (England)

=== Final ===
29 March 2022
20:45

Poland	2–0	Sweden
Lewandowski 49' (pen.); Zieliński 72'	Report (FIFA); Report (UEFA)

Stadion Śląski, Chorzów (Note: The potential final match hosted by Poland, originally scheduled to be played at Stadion Narodowy, Warsaw, was later moved on 19 January 2022 to Stadion Śląski, Chorzów, due to the presence of a temporary hospital at the Stadion Narodowy as part of the response to the COVID-19 pandemic in Poland.)
Attendance: 54,078
Referee: Daniele Orsato (Italy)

== Path C ==
The winner of Path C, Portugal, entered Group H in the final tournament.

=== Bracket ===
Semi-finals
24 March 2022 – Porto
Portugal	3
Turkey	1
24 March 2022 – Palermo
Italy	0
North Macedonia	1

Final
29 March 2022 – Porto
Portugal	2
North Macedonia	0

=== Summary ===
Home team	Score	Away team
Semi-finals
Italy	0–1	North Macedonia
Portugal	3–1	Turkey
Final
Portugal	2–0	North Macedonia

=== Semi-finals ===
24 March 2022
20:45

Italy	0–1	North Macedonia
	Report (FIFA); Report (UEFA)	Trajkovski 90+2'

Stadio Renzo Barbera, Palermo
Attendance: 34,129
Referee: Clément Turpin (France)

24 March 2022
20:45 (19:45 UTC±0)

Portugal	3–1	Turkey
Otávio 15'; Jota 42'; Nunes 90+4'	Report (FIFA); Report (UEFA)	Yılmaz 65'

Estádio do Dragão, Porto
Attendance: 48,010
Referee: Daniel Siebert (Germany)

=== Final ===
29 March 2022
20:45 (19:45 UTC+1)

Portugal	2–0	North Macedonia
Fernandes 32', 65'	Report (FIFA); Report (UEFA)

Estádio do Dragão, Porto
Attendance: 48,010
Referee: Anthony Taylor (England)

== Goalscorers ==
There were 18 goals scored in 8 matches, for an average of 2.25 goals per match.

3 goals

- (Wales national football team) Gareth Bale

2 goals

- (Portugal national football team) Bruno Fernandes

1 goal

- (Austria national football team) Marcel Sabitzer
- (North Macedonia national football team) Aleksandar Trajkovski
- (Poland national football team) Robert Lewandowski
- (Poland national football team) Piotr Zieliński
- (Portugal national football team) Diogo Jota
- (Portugal national football team) Matheus Nunes
- (Portugal national football team) Otávio
- (Scotland national football team) Callum McGregor
- (Sweden men's national football team) Robin Quaison
- (Turkey national football team) Burak Yılmaz
- (Ukraine national football team) Artem Dovbyk
- (Ukraine national football team) Roman Yaremchuk
- (Ukraine national football team) Andriy Yarmolenko

== Discipline ==
A player was automatically suspended for the next match for the following offences:

- Receiving a red card (red card suspensions could be extended for serious offences)
- Receiving two yellow cards in two different qualifying group stage matches (yellow card suspensions were carried forward to the play-off semi-finals, but not the play-off finals, World Cup final tournament or any other future international matches)

On 17 January 2022, following a UEFA request, FIFA announced the expiration of yellow cards received during the qualifying group stage, thus preventing suspensions in the play-off finals due to yellow cards received in the semi-finals. However, yellow card suspensions accumulated at the end of the qualifying group stage were still carried forward to the play-offs.

The following suspensions were served during the second round qualifying matches:

Team	Player	Offence(s)	Suspended for match(es)
North Macedonia	Eljif Elmas	(yellow card) vs Germany (31 March 2021); (yellow card) vs Iceland (14 November 2021)	vs Italy (24 March 2022)
North Macedonia	Tihomir Kostadinov	(yellow card) vs Armenia (11 November 2021); (yellow card) vs Iceland (14 November 2021)	vs Italy (24 March 2022)
Poland	Mateusz Klich	(yellow card) vs Andorra (12 November 2021); (yellow card) vs Hungary (15 November 2021)	vs Sweden (29 March 2022)
Portugal	João Cancelo	(yellow card) vs Luxembourg (12 October 2021); (yellow card) vs Serbia (14 November 2021)	vs Turkey (24 March 2022)
Portugal	Renato Sanches	(yellow card) vs Luxembourg (30 March 2021); (yellow card) vs Serbia (14 November 2021)	vs Turkey (24 March 2022)
Sweden	Zlatan Ibrahimović	(yellow card) vs Georgia (25 March 2021); (yellow card) vs Spain (14 November 2021)	vs Czech Republic (24 March 2022)
Sweden	Emil Krafth	(yellow card) vs Spain (2 September 2021); (yellow card) vs Spain (14 November 2021)	vs Czech Republic (24 March 2022)
Wales	Joe Morrell	(yellow card) vs Estonia (8 September 2021); (yellow card) vs Belgium (16 November 2021)	vs Austria (24 March 2022)

Prior to their suspension, Russia were to serve the following suspensions in their semi-final:

Team	Player	Offence(s)	Suspended for match(es)
Russia	Aleksandr Golovin	(yellow card) vs Slovenia (27 March 2021); (yellow card) vs Croatia (14 November 2021)	vs Poland (24 March 2022)
Russia	Fyodor Smolov	(yellow card) vs Cyprus (4 September 2021); (yellow card) vs Croatia (14 November 2021)	vs Poland (24 March 2022)

== See also ==
- 2022 FIFA World Cup qualification (inter-confederation play-offs)
