= 2022 FIFA World Cup qualification – UEFA Group E =

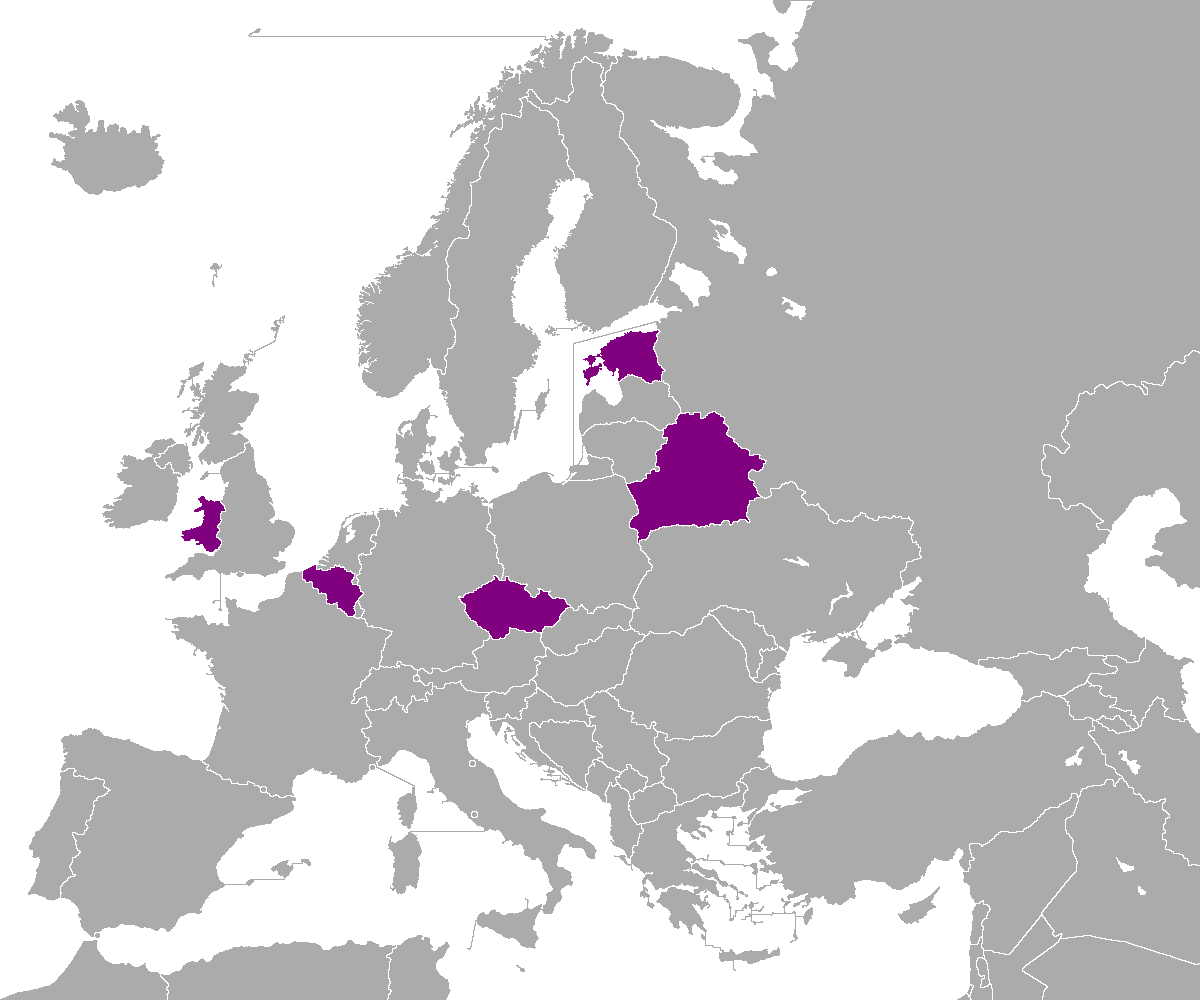
2022 FIFA World Cup qualifiers UEFA Group E

The 2022 FIFA World Cup qualification UEFA Group E was one of the ten UEFA groups in the World Cup qualification tournament to decide which teams would qualify for the 2022 FIFA World Cup finals tournament in Qatar. Group E consisted of five teams: Belarus, Belgium, the Czech Republic, Estonia and Wales. The teams played against each other home-and-away in a round-robin format.

The group winners, Belgium, qualified directly for the World Cup finals, while the runners-up, Wales, and the third-placed team, the Czech Republic, advanced to the second round (play-offs).

== Standings ==
Pos	Team	Pld	W	D	L	GF	GA	GD	Pts	Qualification	Belgium	Wales	Czech Republic	Estonia	Belarus
1	Belgium	8	6	2	0	25	6	+19	20	Qualification for 2022 FIFA World Cup	—	3–1	3–0	3–1	8–0
2	Wales	8	4	3	1	14	9	+5	15	Advance to play-offs	1–1	—	1–0	0–0	5–1
3	Czech Republic	8	4	2	2	14	9	+5	14	Advance to play-offs via Nations League	1–1	2–2	—	2–0	1–0
4	Estonia	8	1	1	6	9	21	−12	4		2–5	0–1	2–6	—	2–0
5	Belarus	8	1	0	7	7	24	−17	3		0–1	2–3	0–2	4–2	—

Source: FIFA, UEFA
Rules for classification: Tiebreakers

== Matches ==
The fixture list was confirmed by UEFA on 8 December 2020, the day following the draw. Times are CET/CEST, (Note: CET (UTC+1) for matches until 27 March and from 31 October (matchday 1–2 and 9–10), and CEST (UTC+2) for matches from 28 March to 30 October 2021 (matchday 3–8).) as listed by UEFA (local times, if different, are in parentheses).

24 March 2021
20:45

Belgium	3–1	Wales
De Bruyne 22'; T. Hazard 28'; Lukaku 73' (pen.)	Report (FIFA); Report (UEFA)	Wilson 11'

Den Dreef, Leuven
Attendance: 0 (Note: Due to the COVID-19 pandemic in Europe, the match was played behind closed doors.)
Referee: Cüneyt Çakır (Turkey)
24 March 2021
20:45

Estonia	2–6	Czech Republic
Sappinen 12'; Anier 86'	Report (FIFA); Report (UEFA)	Schick 18'; Barák 27'; Souček 32', 43', 48'; Jankto 56'

Arena Lublin, Lublin (Poland)
Attendance: 0
Referee: Anastasios Papapetrou (Greece)

27 March 2021
18:00 (20:00 UTC+3)

Belarus	4–2	Estonia
V. Lisakovich 45' (pen.), 83'; Kendysh 64'; Savitski 81'	Report (FIFA); Report (UEFA)	Anier 31', 55'

Dinamo Stadium, Minsk
Attendance: 3,611
Referee: Robert Hennessy (Ireland)
27 March 2021
20:45

Czech Republic	1–1	Belgium
Provod 50'	Report (FIFA); Report (UEFA)	Lukaku 60'

Sinobo Stadium, Prague
Attendance: 0
Referee: Willie Collum (Scotland)

30 March 2021
20:45

Belgium	8–0	Belarus
Batshuayi 14'; Vanaken 17', 89'; Trossard 38', 74'; Doku 42'; Praet 49'; Benteke 70'	Report (FIFA); Report (UEFA)

Den Dreef, Leuven
Attendance: 0
Referee: Donatas Rumšas (Lithuania)
30 March 2021
20:45 (19:45 UTC+1)

Wales	1–0	Czech Republic
James 82'	Report (FIFA); Report (UEFA)

Cardiff City Stadium, Cardiff
Attendance: 0
Referee: Ovidiu Haţegan (Romania)

2 September 2021
20:45

Czech Republic	1–0	Belarus
Barák 34'	Report (FIFA); Report (UEFA)

Městský stadion v Ostravě-Vítkovicích, Ostrava
Attendance: 7,218
Referee: Srđan Jovanović (Serbia)
2 September 2021
20:45 (21:45 UTC+3)

Estonia	2–5	Belgium
Käit 2'; Sorga 83'	Report (FIFA); Report (UEFA)	Vanaken 22'; Lukaku 29', 52'; Witsel 65'; Foket 76'

Lilleküla Stadium, Tallinn
Attendance: 6,685
Referee: Guillermo Cuadra Fernández (Spain)

5 September 2021
15:00 (16:00 UTC+3)

Belarus	2–3	Wales
V. Lisakovich 29' (pen.); Sedko 31'	Report (FIFA); Report (UEFA)	Bale 6' (pen.), 69' (pen.), 90+3'

Central Stadium, Kazan (Russia)
Attendance: 0 (Note: The match was played behind closed doors.)
Referee: Giorgi Kruashvili (Georgia)
5 September 2021
20:45

Belgium	3–0	Czech Republic
Lukaku 8'; E. Hazard 41'; Saelemaekers 65'	Report (FIFA); Report (UEFA)

King Baudouin Stadium, Brussels
Attendance: 21,416
Referee: Michael Oliver (England)

8 September 2021
20:45 (21:45 UTC+3)

Belarus	0–1	Belgium
	Report (FIFA); Report (UEFA)	Praet 33'

Central Stadium, Kazan (Russia)
Attendance: 0
Referee: Paweł Raczkowski (Poland)
8 September 2021
20:45 (19:45 UTC+1)

Wales	0–0	Estonia
	Report (FIFA); Report (UEFA)

Cardiff City Stadium, Cardiff
Attendance: 21,624
Referee: Ruddy Buquet (France)

8 October 2021
20:45

Czech Republic	2–2	Wales
Pešek 38'; Ward 49' (o.g.)	Report (FIFA); Report (UEFA)	Ramsey 36'; James 69'

Sinobo Stadium, Prague
Attendance: 16,856
Referee: Deniz Aytekin (Germany)
8 October 2021
20:45 (21:45 UTC+3)

Estonia	2–0	Belarus
Sorga 58'; Zenjov 90+3'	Report (FIFA); Report (UEFA)

Lilleküla Stadium, Tallinn
Attendance: 3,597
Referee: Mohammed Al-Hakim (Sweden)

11 October 2021
20:45 (21:45 UTC+3)

Belarus	0–2	Czech Republic
	Report (FIFA); Report (UEFA)	Schick 22'; Hložek 65'

Central Stadium, Kazan (Russia)
Attendance: 0
Referee: François Letexier (France)
11 October 2021
20:45 (21:45 UTC+3)

Estonia	0–1	Wales
	Report (FIFA); Report (UEFA)	Moore 12'

Lilleküla Stadium, Tallinn
Attendance: 5,118
Referee: Sandro Schärer (Switzerland)

13 November 2021
20:45

Belgium	3–1	Estonia
Benteke 11'; Carrasco 53'; T. Hazard 74'	Report (FIFA); Report (UEFA)	Sorga 70'

King Baudouin Stadium, Brussels
Attendance: 29,865
Referee: Halil Umut Meler (Turkey)
13 November 2021
20:45 (19:45 UTC±0)

Wales	5–1	Belarus
Ramsey 3', 50' (pen.); N. Williams 20'; B. Davies 77'; C. Roberts 89'	Report (FIFA); Report (UEFA)	Kontsevoy 87'

Cardiff City Stadium, Cardiff
Attendance: 27,152
Referee: Maurizio Mariani (Italy)

16 November 2021
20:45

Czech Republic	2–0	Estonia
Brabec 59'; Sýkora 85'	Report (FIFA); Report (UEFA)

Stadion Letná, Prague
Attendance: 10,076
Referee: Orel Grinfeld (Israel)
16 November 2021
20:45 (19:45 UTC±0)

Wales	1–1	Belgium
Moore 32'	Report (FIFA); Report (UEFA)	De Bruyne 12'

Cardiff City Stadium, Cardiff
Attendance: 32,343
Referee: Artur Soares Dias (Portugal)

== Goalscorers ==
There were 69 goals scored in 20 matches, for an average of 3.45 goals per match.

5 goals

- (Belgium national football team) Romelu Lukaku

3 goals

- (Belarus national football team) Vitaly Lisakovich
- (Belgium national football team) Hans Vanaken
- (Czech Republic national football team) Tomáš Souček
- (Estonia national football team) Henri Anier
- (Estonia national football team) Erik Sorga
- (Wales national football team) Gareth Bale
- (Wales national football team) Aaron Ramsey

2 goals

- (Belgium national football team) Christian Benteke
- (Belgium national football team) Kevin De Bruyne
- (Belgium national football team) Thorgan Hazard
- (Belgium national football team) Dennis Praet
- (Belgium national football team) Leandro Trossard
- (Czech Republic national football team) Antonín Barák
- (Czech Republic national football team) Patrik Schick
- (Wales national football team) Daniel James
- (Wales national football team) Kieffer Moore

1 goal

- (Belarus national football team) Yury Kendysh
- (Belarus national football team) Artem Kontsevoy
- (Belarus national football team) Pavel Savitski
- (Belarus national football team) Pavel Sedko
- (Belgium national football team) Michy Batshuayi
- (Belgium national football team) Yannick Carrasco
- (Belgium national football team) Jérémy Doku
- (Belgium national football team) Thomas Foket
- (Belgium national football team) Eden Hazard
- (Belgium national football team) Alexis Saelemaekers
- (Belgium national football team) Axel Witsel
- (Czech Republic national football team) Jakub Brabec
- (Czech Republic national football team) Adam Hložek
- (Czech Republic national football team) Jakub Jankto
- (Czech Republic national football team) Jakub Pešek
- (Czech Republic national football team) Lukáš Provod
- (Czech Republic national football team) Jan Sýkora
- (Estonia national football team) Mattias Käit
- (Estonia national football team) Rauno Sappinen
- (Estonia national football team) Sergei Zenjov
- (Wales national football team) Ben Davies
- (Wales national football team) Connor Roberts
- (Wales national football team) Neco Williams
- (Wales national football team) Harry Wilson

1 own goal

- (Wales national football team) Danny Ward (against Czech Republic)

== Discipline ==
A player was automatically suspended for the next match for the following offences:

- Receiving a red card (red card suspensions could be extended for serious offences)
- Receiving two yellow cards in two different matches (yellow card suspensions were carried forward to the play-offs, but not the finals or any other future international matches)

The following suspensions were served during the qualifying matches:

Team	Player	Offence(s)	Suspended for match(es)
Belarus	Artyom Bykov	(yellow card) vs Wales (5 September 2021); (yellow card) vs Czech Republic (11 October 2021)	vs Wales (13 November 2021)
Belarus	Max Ebong	(yellow card) vs Czech Republic (2 September 2021); (yellow card) vs Belgium (8 September 2021)	vs Estonia (8 October 2021)
Belgium	Romelu Lukaku	(yellow card) vs Estonia (2 September 2021); (yellow card) vs Czech Republic (5 September 2021)	vs Belarus (8 September 2021)
Belgium	Jan Vertonghen	(yellow card) vs Czech Republic (27 March 2021); (yellow card) vs Czech Republic (5 September 2021)	vs Belarus (8 September 2021)
Czech Republic	Antonín Barák	(yellow card) vs Belgium (5 September 2021); (yellow card) vs Wales (8 October 2021)	vs Belarus (11 October 2021)
Czech Republic	Patrik Schick	(red card) vs Wales (30 March 2021)	vs Belarus (2 September 2021) vs Belgium (5 September 2021)
Estonia	Henri Anier	(yellow card) vs Belarus (27 March 2021); (yellow card) vs Belarus (8 October 2021)	vs Wales (11 October 2021)
Estonia	Vladislav Kreida	(yellow card) vs Wales (8 September 2021); (yellow card) vs Belarus (8 October 2021)	vs Wales (11 October 2021)
Estonia	Märten Kuusk	(yellow card) vs Belarus (27 March 2021); (yellow card) vs Wales (11 October 2021)	vs Belgium (13 November 2021)
Estonia	Karl Rudolf Õigus	(yellow card) (yellow-red card) vs Belarus (27 March 2021)	vs Belgium (2 September 2021)
Wales	Ethan Ampadu	(yellow card) vs Czech Republic (8 October 2021); (yellow card) vs Belarus (13 November 2021)	vs Belgium (16 November 2021)
Wales	Kieffer Moore	(yellow card) vs Czech Republic (8 October 2021); (yellow card) vs Estonia (11 October 2021)	vs Belarus (13 November 2021)
Wales	Connor Roberts	(yellow card) (yellow-red card) vs Czech Republic (30 March 2021)	vs Belarus (5 September 2021)
Wales	Harry Wilson	(red card) vs Denmark in UEFA Euro 2020 (26 June 2021)	vs Belarus (5 September 2021)
