= Benas Šatkus =

Lithuanian footballer

Personal information
- Date of birth: 1 April 2001 (age 25)
- Place of birth: Klaipėda, Lithuania
- Height: 1.90 m (6 ft 3 in)
- Position: Centre-back

Youth career
- –2017: Banga Gargždai
- 2017–2022: 1. FC Nürnberg

Senior career*
Years	Team	Apps	(Gls)
2020–2022	1. FC Nürnberg II	18	(1)
2022–2023	VfL Osnabrück	0	(0)
2023	→ Banga Gargždai (loan)	10	(0)
2024	Banga Gargždai	14	(0)

International career^{‡}
2017	Lithuania U17	3	(0)
2019–	Lithuania U21	5	(0)
2019–	Lithuania	14	(0)
- * Club domestic league appearances and goals as of 6 February 2025 (UTC) ‡ National team caps and goals as of 17 April 2023

Benas Šatkus (born 1 April 2001) is a Lithuanian professional footballer who plays as a centre-back for the Lithuania national team.

== Club career ==
=== 1. FC Nürnberg ===
In 2020, Šatkus signed his first professional contract with 1. FC Nürnberg. In German he played from summer of the 2020. He appeared for the reserves, competing in Fußball-Regionalliga Bayern.

=== VfL Osnabrück ===
In the summer of 2022, Šatkus moved to 3. Liga club VfL Osnabrück.

== International career ==
Šatkus made his international debut for Lithuania national team on 17 November 2019 in a friendly match against New Zealand, which finished as a 1–0 home win.
