= 2020–21 UEFA Nations League A =

Tournament details
- Dates: League phase: 3 September – 18 November 2020; Nations League Finals: 6–10 October 2021
- Teams: 16

Final positions
- Champions: France (1st title)
- Runners-up: Spain
- Third place: Italy
- Fourth place: Belgium
- Relegated: Bosnia and Herzegovina; Iceland; Sweden; Ukraine

Tournament statistics
- Matches played: 51
- Goals scored: 143 (2.8 per match)
- Attendance: 156,538 (3,069 per match)
- Top scorer(s): (Belgium) Romelu Lukaku (Spain) Ferran Torres (6 goals each)

The 2020–21 UEFA Nations League A was the top division of the 2020–21 edition of the UEFA Nations League, the second season of the international football competition involving the men's national teams of the 55 member associations of UEFA. League A culminated with the Nations League Finals in October 2021 to determine the champions of the competition.

Portugal were the defending champions, having won the inaugural 2019 finals. However, they failed to qualify for the 2021 finals after finishing second in their group behind France. None of the teams that had qualified for the previous UEFA Nations League Finals qualified for the 2021 edition.

France won the final 2–1 against Spain for their first UEFA Nations League title.

== Format ==
Following a format change from the first season, League A was expanded from 12 to 16 teams. The league consisted of the top ranked UEFA members from 1–16 in the 2018–19 UEFA Nations League overall ranking, split into four groups of four. Each team played six matches within their group, using the home-and-away round-robin format on double matchdays in September, October and November 2020. The winners of each group advanced to the 2021 UEFA Nations League Finals, and the fourth-placed team of each group was relegated to the 2022–23 UEFA Nations League B.

The Nations League Finals was played in a knockout format, consisting of the semi-finals, third place play-off, and final. The semi-final pairings were determined by means of an open draw. Host country Italy was selected among the four qualified teams by the UEFA Executive Committee, with the winners of the final crowned as the champions of the UEFA Nations League. Though originally planned for 2–6 June 2021, the Nations League Finals were moved to October 2021 following the rescheduling of UEFA Euro 2020 to June and July 2021 due to the COVID-19 pandemic.

The four group winners were drawn into groups of five teams for 2022 FIFA World Cup qualification (in order to accommodate for the Nations League Finals).

== Teams ==
=== Team changes ===
The following were the team changes of League A from the 2018–19 season:

Incoming
Promoted from
Nations League B
- Bosnia and Herzegovina
- Denmark
- Sweden
- Ukraine

The following team changes were initially set to occur in League A, but did not after no teams were relegated due to the format change by UEFA:

Outgoing
Initially relegated to
Nations League B
- Croatia
- Germany
- Iceland
- Poland

=== Seeding ===
In the 2020–21 access list, UEFA ranked teams based on the 2018–19 Nations League overall ranking, with a slight modification: teams that were originally relegated in the previous season were ranked immediately below teams promoted prior to the format change. The seeding pots for the league phase were confirmed 4 December 2019, and were based on the access list ranking.

Pot 1
Team	Rank
Portugal (title holders)	1
Netherlands	2
England	3
Switzerland	4

Pot 2
Team	Rank
Belgium	5
France	6
Spain	7
Italy	8

Pot 3
Team	Rank
Bosnia and Herzegovina	9
Ukraine	10
Denmark	11
Sweden	12

Pot 4
Team	Rank
Croatia	13
Poland	14
Germany	15
Iceland	16

The draw for the league phase took place at the Beurs van Berlage Conference Centre in Amsterdam, Netherlands on 3 March 2020, 18:00 CET. Each group contained one team from each pot.

== Groups ==
The original fixture list was confirmed by UEFA on 3 March 2020 following the draw. On 17 June 2020, the UEFA Executive Committee adjusted the league phase schedule for October and November 2020 to allow for the completion of the UEFA Euro 2020 qualifying play-offs. Following the change, a revised schedule for the October and November 2020 fixtures was released by UEFA on 26 June 2020.

Times are CET/CEST, (Note: CEST (UTC+2) for matchdays 1–4 (September and October 2020), CET (UTC+1) for matchdays 5–6 (November 2020).) as listed by UEFA (local times, if different, are in parentheses).

=== Group 1 ===
Pos	Team	Pld	W	D	L	GF	GA	GD	Pts	Qualification or relegation	(Italy)	(Netherlands)	(Poland)	(Bosnia and Herzegovina)
1	Italy	6	3	3	0	7	2	+5	12	Qualification for Nations League Finals	—	1–1	2–0	1–1
2	Netherlands	6	3	2	1	7	4	+3	11		0–1	—	1–0	3–1
3	Poland	6	2	1	3	6	6	0	7		0–0	1–2	—	3–0
4	Bosnia and Herzegovina (R)	6	0	2	4	3	11	−8	2	Relegation to League B	0–2	0–0	1–2	—

Source: UEFA
Rules for classification: Tiebreakers
(R) Relegated
4 September 2020
20:45

Italy	1–1	Bosnia and Herzegovina
Sensi 67'	Report	Džeko 57'

Stadio Artemio Franchi, Florence
Attendance: 0 (Note: Due to the COVID-19 pandemic in Europe, all matches scheduled for September 2020 were played behind closed doors.)
Referee: Anastasios Sidiropoulos (Greece)
4 September 2020
20:45

Netherlands	1–0	Poland
Bergwijn 61'	Report

Johan Cruyff Arena, Amsterdam
Attendance: 0
Referee: Georgi Kabakov (Bulgaria)

7 September 2020
20:45

Bosnia and Herzegovina	1–2	Poland
Hajradinović 24' (pen.)	Report	Glik 45'; Grosicki 67'

Bilino Polje, Zenica
Attendance: 0
Referee: Cüneyt Çakır (Turkey)
7 September 2020
20:45

Netherlands	0–1	Italy
	Report	Barella 45+1'

Johan Cruyff Arena, Amsterdam
Attendance: 0
Referee: Felix Brych (Germany)

11 October 2020
18:00

Bosnia and Herzegovina	0–0	Netherlands
	Report

Bilino Polje, Zenica
Attendance: 1,600
Referee: István Kovács (Romania)
11 October 2020
20:45

Poland	0–0	Italy
	Report

Stadion Energa Gdańsk, Gdańsk
Attendance: 9,200
Referee: José María Sánchez Martínez (Spain)

14 October 2020
20:45

Italy	1–1	Netherlands
Pellegrini 16'	Report	Van de Beek 25'

Stadio Atleti Azzurri d'Italia, Bergamo
Attendance: 623
Referee: Anthony Taylor (England)
14 October 2020
20:45

Poland	3–0	Bosnia and Herzegovina
Lewandowski 40', 52'; Linetty 45+1'	Report

Stadion Miejski, Wrocław
Attendance: 8,152
Referee: Craig Pawson (England)

15 November 2020
18:00

Netherlands	3–1	Bosnia and Herzegovina
Wijnaldum 6', 14'; Depay 55'	Report	Prevljak 63'

Johan Cruyff Arena, Amsterdam
Attendance: 0 (Note: Due to the COVID-19 pandemic in Europe, the match was played behind closed doors.)
Referee: François Letexier (France)
15 November 2020
20:45

Italy	2–0	Poland
Jorginho 27' (pen.); Berardi 84'	Report

Stadio Città del Tricolore, Reggio Emilia
Attendance: 0
Referee: Clément Turpin (France)

18 November 2020
20:45

Bosnia and Herzegovina	0–2	Italy
	Report	Belotti 22'; Berardi 68'

Stadion Grbavica, Sarajevo
Attendance: 0
Referee: Artur Soares Dias (Portugal)
18 November 2020
20:45

Poland	1–2	Netherlands
Jóźwiak 6'	Report	Depay 77' (pen.); Wijnaldum 84'

Silesian Stadium, Chorzów
Attendance: 0
Referee: Orel Grinfeld (Israel)

=== Group 2 ===
Pos	Team	Pld	W	D	L	GF	GA	GD	Pts	Qualification or relegation	(Belgium)	(Denmark)	(England)	(Iceland)
1	Belgium	6	5	0	1	16	6	+10	15	Qualification for Nations League Finals	—	4–2	2–0	5–1
2	Denmark	6	3	1	2	8	7	+1	10 (Note: Head-to-head points: Denmark 4, England 1.)		0–2	—	0–0	2–1
3	England	6	3	1	2	7	4	+3	10		2–1	0–1	—	4–0
4	Iceland (R)	6	0	0	6	3	17	−14	0	Relegation to League B	1–2	0–3	0–1	—

Source: UEFA
Rules for classification: Tiebreakers
(R) Relegated
Notes:
5 September 2020
18:00 (16:00 UTC±0)

Iceland	0–1	England
	Report	Sterling 90+1' (pen.)

Laugardalsvöllur, Reykjavík
Attendance: 0
Referee: Srđan Jovanović (Serbia)
5 September 2020
20:45

Denmark	0–2	Belgium
	Report	Denayer 9'; Mertens 76'

Parken Stadium, Copenhagen
Attendance: 0
Referee: Sandro Schärer (Switzerland)

8 September 2020
20:45

Belgium	5–1	Iceland
Witsel 13'; Batshuayi 17', 69'; Mertens 50'; Doku 80'	Report	H. Friðjónsson 11'

King Baudouin Stadium, Brussels
Attendance: 0
Referee: Paweł Raczkowski (Poland)
8 September 2020
20:45

Denmark	0–0	England
	Report

Parken Stadium, Copenhagen
Attendance: 0
Referee: István Kovács (Romania)

11 October 2020
18:00 (17:00 UTC+1)

England	2–1	Belgium
Rashford 39' (pen.); Mount 65'	Report	Lukaku 16' (pen.)

Wembley Stadium, London
Attendance: 0
Referee: Tobias Stieler (Germany)
11 October 2020
20:45 (18:45 UTC±0)

Iceland	0–3	Denmark
	Report	Sigurjónsson 45' (o.g.); Eriksen 46'; Skov 61'

Laugardalsvöllur, Reykjavík
Attendance: 60
Referee: Bojan Pandžić (Sweden)

14 October 2020
20:45 (19:45 UTC+1)

England	0–1	Denmark
	Report	Eriksen 35' (pen.)

Wembley Stadium, London
Attendance: 0
Referee: Jesús Gil Manzano (Spain)
14 October 2020
20:45 (18:45 UTC±0)

Iceland	1–2	Belgium
Sævarsson 17'	Report	Lukaku 9', 38' (pen.)

Laugardalsvöllur, Reykjavík
Attendance: 60
Referee: Andris Treimanis (Latvia)

15 November 2020
20:45

Belgium	2–0	England
Tielemans 10'; Mertens 24'	Report

Den Dreef, Leuven
Attendance: 0
Referee: Danny Makkelie (Netherlands)
15 November 2020
20:45

Denmark	2–1	Iceland
Eriksen 12' (pen.), 90+2' (pen.)	Report	Kjartansson 85'

Parken Stadium, Copenhagen
Attendance: 141
Referee: Halil Umut Meler (Turkey)

18 November 2020
20:45

Belgium	4–2	Denmark
Tielemans 3'; Lukaku 56', 69'; De Bruyne 87'	Report	Wind 17'; Chadli 86' (o.g.)

Den Dreef, Leuven
Attendance: 0
Referee: Slavko Vinčić (Slovenia)
18 November 2020
20:45 (19:45 UTC±0)

England	4–0	Iceland
Rice 20'; Mount 24'; Foden 80', 84'	Report

Wembley Stadium, London
Attendance: 0
Referee: Fábio Veríssimo (Portugal)

=== Group 3 ===
Pos	Team	Pld	W	D	L	GF	GA	GD	Pts	Qualification or relegation	(France)	(Portugal)	(Croatia)	(Sweden)
1	France	6	5	1	0	12	5	+7	16	Qualification for Nations League Finals	—	0–0	4–2	4–2
2	Portugal	6	4	1	1	12	4	+8	13		0–1	—	4–1	3–0
3	Croatia	6	1	0	5	9	16	−7	3 (Note: Tied on head-to-head results. Overall goal difference was used as the tiebreaker.)		1–2	2–3	—	2–1
4	Sweden (R)	6	1	0	5	5	13	−8	3	Relegation to League B	0–1	0–2	2–1	—

Source: UEFA
Rules for classification: Tiebreakers
(R) Relegated
Notes:
5 September 2020
20:45 (19:45 UTC+1)

Portugal	4–1	Croatia
Cancelo 41'; Jota 58'; Félix 70'; A. Silva 90+5'	Report	Petković 90+1'

Estádio do Dragão, Porto
Attendance: 0
Referee: Davide Massa (Italy)
5 September 2020
20:45

Sweden	0–1	France
	Report	Mbappé 41'

Friends Arena, Solna
Attendance: 0
Referee: Szymon Marciniak (Poland)

8 September 2020
20:45

France	4–2	Croatia
Griezmann 43'; Livaković 45+1' (o.g.); Upamecano 65'; Giroud 77' (pen.)	Report	Lovren 17'; Brekalo 55'

Stade de France, Saint-Denis
Attendance: 0
Referee: Ovidiu Hațegan (Romania)
8 September 2020
20:45

Sweden	0–2	Portugal
	Report	Ronaldo 45+1', 72'

Friends Arena, Solna
Attendance: 0
Referee: Danny Makkelie (Netherlands)

11 October 2020
18:00

Croatia	2–1	Sweden
Vlašić 32'; Kramarić 84'	Report	Berg 66'

Stadion Maksimir, Zagreb
Attendance: 2,020
Referee: John Beaton (Scotland)
11 October 2020
20:45

France	0–0	Portugal
	Report

Stade de France, Saint-Denis
Attendance: 1,000
Referee: Carlos del Cerro Grande (Spain)

14 October 2020
20:45

Croatia	1–2	France
Vlašić 64'	Report	Griezmann 8'; Mbappé 79'

Stadion Maksimir, Zagreb
Attendance: 6,266
Referee: Björn Kuipers (Netherlands)
14 October 2020
20:45 (19:45 UTC+1)

Portugal	3–0	Sweden
B. Silva 21'; Jota 44', 72'	Report

Estádio José Alvalade, Lisbon
Attendance: 5,000
Referee: Srđan Jovanović (Serbia)

14 November 2020
20:45 (19:45 UTC±0)

Portugal	0–1	France
	Report	Kanté 54'

Estádio da Luz, Lisbon
Attendance: 0
Referee: Tobias Stieler (Germany)
14 November 2020
20:45

Sweden	2–1	Croatia
Kulusevski 36'; Danielson 45+2'	Report	Danielson 82' (o.g.)

Friends Arena, Solna
Attendance: 0
Referee: Daniel Siebert (Germany)

17 November 2020
20:45

Croatia	2–3	Portugal
Kovačić 29', 65'	Report	Dias 52', 90'; Félix 60'

Stadion Poljud, Split
Attendance: 0
Referee: Michael Oliver (England)
17 November 2020
20:45

France	4–2	Sweden
Giroud 16', 59'; Pavard 36'; Coman 90+5'	Report	Claesson 4'; Quaison 88'

Stade de France, Saint-Denis
Attendance: 0
Referee: Aleksei Kulbakov (Belarus)

=== Group 4 ===
Pos	Team	Pld	W	D	L	GF	GA	GD	Pts	Qualification or relegation	(Spain)	(Germany)	(Switzerland)	(Ukraine)
1	Spain	6	3	2	1	13	3	+10	11	Qualification for Nations League Finals	—	6–0	1–0	4–0
2	Germany	6	2	3	1	10	13	−3	9		1–1	—	3–3	3–1
3	Switzerland	6	1	3	2	9	8	+1	6 (Note: Tied on head-to-head points (3). Head-to-head goal difference: Switzerland +2, Ukraine −2.)		1–1	1–1	—	3–0 (Note: The Switzerland v Ukraine match was awarded as a 3–0 win to Switzerland after being cancelled as Ukraine were placed in quarantine prior to the match due to positive SARS-CoV-2 tests in the team.)
4	Ukraine (R)	6	2	0	4	5	13	−8	6	Relegation to League B	1–0	1–2	2–1	—

Source: UEFA
Rules for classification: Tiebreakers
(R) Relegated
Notes:
3 September 2020
20:45

Germany	1–1	Spain
Werner 51'	Report	Gayà 90+6'

Mercedes-Benz Arena, Stuttgart
Attendance: 0
Referee: Daniele Orsato (Italy)
3 September 2020
20:45 (21:45 UTC+3)

Ukraine	2–1	Switzerland
Yarmolenko 14'; Zinchenko 68'	Report	Seferovic 41'

Arena Lviv, Lviv
Attendance: 0
Referee: Andreas Ekberg (Sweden)

6 September 2020
20:45

Spain	4–0	Ukraine
Ramos 3' (pen.), 29'; Fati 32'; F. Torres 84'	Report

Alfredo Di Stéfano, Madrid
Attendance: 0
Referee: Benoît Bastien (France)
6 September 2020
20:45

Switzerland	1–1	Germany
Widmer 58'	Report	Gündoğan 14'

St. Jakob-Park, Basel
Attendance: 0
Referee: Michael Oliver (England)

10 October 2020
20:45

Spain	1–0	Switzerland
Oyarzabal 14'	Report

Alfredo Di Stéfano, Madrid
Attendance: 0
Referee: Ali Palabıyık (Turkey)
10 October 2020
20:45 (21:45 UTC+3)

Ukraine	1–2	Germany
Malinovskyi 77' (pen.)	Report	Ginter 20'; Goretzka 49'

NSC Olimpiyskiy Stadium, Kyiv
Attendance: 17,753
Referee: Orel Grinfeld (Israel)

13 October 2020
20:45

Germany	3–3	Switzerland
Werner 28'; Havertz 55'; Gnabry 60'	Report	Gavranović 5', 57'; Freuler 26'

RheinEnergieStadion, Cologne
Attendance: 0
Referee: Ruddy Buquet (France)
13 October 2020
20:45 (21:45 UTC+3)

Ukraine	1–0	Spain
Tsyhankov 76'	Report

NSC Olimpiyskiy Stadium, Kyiv
Attendance: 10,495
Referee: Paweł Gil (Poland)

14 November 2020
20:45

Germany	3–1	Ukraine
Sané 23'; Werner 33', 64'	Report	Yaremchuk 12'

Red Bull Arena, Leipzig
Attendance: 0
Referee: Ovidiu Hațegan (Romania)
14 November 2020
20:45

Switzerland	1–1	Spain
Freuler 26'	Report	Gerard 89'

St. Jakob-Park, Basel
Attendance: 0
Referee: Willie Collum (Scotland)

17 November 2020
20:45

Spain	6–0	Germany
Morata 17'; F. Torres 33', 55', 71'; Rodri 38'; Oyarzabal 89'	Report

La Cartuja, Seville
Attendance: 0
Referee: Andreas Ekberg (Sweden)
17 November 2020
20:45

Switzerland	3–0 Awarded (Note: The Switzerland v Ukraine match was cancelled and awarded as a 3–0 win to Switzerland after the Ukraine national team were placed in quarantine by the Department of Health of the Canton of Lucerne due to positive SARS-CoV-2 tests in the squad. The Ukrainian Association of Football appealed the decision to the Court of Arbitration for Sport, which was subsequently dismissed.)	Ukraine
	Report

Swissporarena, Lucerne
Referee: Anastasios Sidiropoulos (Greece)

== Nations League Finals ==
The host of the Nations League Finals, Italy, was selected from the four qualified teams. The semi-final pairings were determined by means of an open draw on 3 December 2020, 17:30 CET, at the UEFA headquarters in Nyon, Switzerland. For scheduling purposes, the host team was allocated to semi-final 1 as the administrative home team.

Times are CEST (UTC+2), as listed by UEFA.

=== Bracket ===
Semi-finals
6 October – Milan
Italy	1
Spain	2
7 October – Turin
Belgium	2
France	3

Final
10 October – Milan
Spain	1
France	2
Third place play-off
10 October – Turin
Italy	2
Belgium	1

=== Semi-finals ===
6 October 2021
20:45

Italy	1–2	Spain
Pellegrini 83'	Report	F. Torres 17', 45+2'

San Siro, Milan
Attendance: 33,524
Referee: Sergei Karasev (Russia)

7 October 2021
20:45

Belgium	2–3	France
Carrasco 37'; Lukaku 40'	Report	Benzema 62'; Mbappé 69' (pen.); T. Hernandez 90'

Juventus Stadium, Turin
Attendance: 12,409
Referee: Daniel Siebert (Germany)

=== Third-place play-off ===
10 October 2021
15:00

Italy	2–1	Belgium
Barella 46'; Berardi 65' (pen.)	Report	De Ketelaere 86'

Juventus Stadium, Turin
Attendance: 16,724
Referee: Srđan Jovanović (Serbia)

=== Final ===
10 October 2021
20:45

Spain	1–2	France
Oyarzabal 64'	Report	Benzema 66'; Mbappé 80'

San Siro, Milan
Attendance: 31,511
Referee: Anthony Taylor (England)

== Goalscorers ==
There were 143 goals scored in 51 matches, for an average of 2.8 goals per match.

6 goals

- (Belgium) Romelu Lukaku
- (Spain) Ferran Torres

4 goals

- (Denmark) Christian Eriksen
- (France) Kylian Mbappé
- (Germany) Timo Werner

3 goals

- (Belgium) Dries Mertens
- (France) Olivier Giroud
- (Italy) Domenico Berardi
- (Netherlands) Georginio Wijnaldum
- (Portugal) Diogo Jota
- (Spain) Mikel Oyarzabal

2 goals

- (Belgium) Michy Batshuayi
- (Belgium) Youri Tielemans
- (Croatia) Mateo Kovačić
- (Croatia) Nikola Vlašić
- (England) Phil Foden
- (England) Mason Mount
- (France) Karim Benzema
- (France) Antoine Griezmann
- (Italy) Nicolò Barella
- (Italy) Lorenzo Pellegrini
- (Netherlands) Memphis Depay
- (Poland) Robert Lewandowski
- (Portugal) Rúben Dias
- (Portugal) João Félix
- (Portugal) Cristiano Ronaldo
- (Spain) Sergio Ramos
- (Switzerland) Remo Freuler
- (Switzerland) Mario Gavranović

1 goal

- (Belgium) Yannick Carrasco
- (Belgium) Kevin De Bruyne
- (Belgium) Charles De Ketelaere
- (Belgium) Jason Denayer
- (Belgium) Jérémy Doku
- (Belgium) Axel Witsel
- (Bosnia and Herzegovina) Edin Džeko
- (Bosnia and Herzegovina) Haris Hajradinović
- (Bosnia and Herzegovina) Smail Prevljak
- (Croatia) Josip Brekalo
- (Croatia) Andrej Kramarić
- (Croatia) Dejan Lovren
- (Croatia) Bruno Petković
- (Denmark) Robert Skov
- (Denmark) Jonas Wind
- (England) Marcus Rashford
- (England) Declan Rice
- (England) Raheem Sterling
- (France) Kingsley Coman
- (France) Theo Hernandez
- (France) N'Golo Kanté
- (France) Benjamin Pavard
- (France) Dayot Upamecano
- (Germany) Matthias Ginter
- (Germany) Serge Gnabry
- (Germany) Leon Goretzka
- (Germany) İlkay Gündoğan
- (Germany) Kai Havertz
- (Germany) Leroy Sané
- (Iceland) Hólmbert Friðjónsson
- (Iceland) Viðar Örn Kjartansson
- (Iceland) Birkir Már Sævarsson
- (Italy) Andrea Belotti
- (Italy) Jorginho
- (Italy) Stefano Sensi
- (Netherlands) Donny van de Beek
- (Netherlands) Steven Bergwijn
- (Poland) Kamil Glik
- (Poland) Kamil Grosicki
- (Poland) Kamil Jóźwiak
- (Poland) Karol Linetty
- (Portugal) João Cancelo
- (Portugal) André Silva
- (Portugal) Bernardo Silva
- (Spain) Ansu Fati
- (Spain) José Gayà
- (Spain) Gerard
- (Spain) Álvaro Morata
- (Spain) Rodri
- (Sweden) Marcus Berg
- (Sweden) Viktor Claesson
- (Sweden) Marcus Danielson
- (Sweden) Dejan Kulusevski
- (Sweden) Robin Quaison
- (Switzerland) Haris Seferović
- (Switzerland) Silvan Widmer
- (Ukraine) Ruslan Malinovskyi
- (Ukraine) Viktor Tsyhankov
- (Ukraine) Roman Yaremchuk
- (Ukraine) Andriy Yarmolenko
- (Ukraine) Oleksandr Zinchenko

1 own goal

- (Belgium) Nacer Chadli (against Denmark)
- (Croatia) Dominik Livaković (against France)
- (Iceland) Rúnar Már Sigurjónsson (against Denmark)
- (Sweden) Marcus Danielson (against Croatia)

== Overall ranking ==
The 16 League A teams were ranked 1st to 16th overall in the 2020–21 UEFA Nations League according to the following rules:

- The teams finishing first in the groups were ranked 1st to 4th according to the results of the Nations League Finals.
- The teams finishing second in the groups were ranked 5th to 8th according to the results of the league phase.
- The teams finishing third in the groups were ranked 9th to 12th according to the results of the league phase.
- The teams finishing fourth in the groups were ranked 13th to 16th according to the results of the league phase.

Rnk	Grp	Team	Pld	W	D	L	GF	GA	GD	Pts
1	A3	France	6	5	1	0	12	5	+7	16
2	A4	Spain	6	3	2	1	13	3	+10	11
3	A1	Italy	6	3	3	0	7	2	+5	12
4	A2	Belgium	6	5	0	1	16	6	+10	15
5	A3	Portugal	6	4	1	1	12	4	+8	13
6	A1	Netherlands	6	3	2	1	7	4	+3	11
7	A2	Denmark	6	3	1	2	8	7	+1	10
8	A4	Germany	6	2	3	1	10	13	−3	9
9	A2	England	6	3	1	2	7	4	+3	10
10	A1	Poland	6	2	1	3	6	6	0	7
11	A4	Switzerland	6	1	3	2	9	8	+1	6
12	A3	Croatia	6	1	0	5	9	16	−7	3
13	A4	Ukraine	6	2	0	4	5	13	−8	6
14	A3	Sweden	6	1	0	5	5	13	−8	3
15	A1	Bosnia and Herzegovina	6	0	2	4	3	11	−8	2
16	A2	Iceland	6	0	0	6	3	17	−14	0

Source: UEFA
Rules for classification: Ranking criteria
