= 2020–21 UEFA Nations League =

Association football competition

Tournament details
- Dates: League phase: 3 September – 18 November 2020; Nations League Finals: 6–10 October 2021; Relegation play-outs: 24–29 March 2022
- Teams: 55

Final positions
- Champions: France (1st title)
- Runners-up: Spain
- Third place: Italy
- Fourth place: Belgium

Tournament statistics
- Matches played: 168
- Goals scored: 382 (2.27 per match)
- Attendance: 222,505 (1,324 per match)
- Top scorer(s): (Belgium) Romelu Lukaku (Norway) Erling Haaland (Spain) Ferran Torres (6 goals each)

The 2020–21 UEFA Nations League was the second season of the UEFA Nations League, an international association football competition involving the men's national teams of the 55 member associations of UEFA. The competition was held from September to November 2020 (league phase), October 2021 (Nations League Finals) and March 2022 (relegation play-outs).

Portugal were the defending champions, having won the inaugural 2019 finals. However, they failed to qualify for the 2021 finals after finishing second in their group behind France. None of the teams that had qualified for the previous UEFA Nations League Finals qualified for the 2021 edition.

France won the final 2–1 against Spain for their first UEFA Nations League title.

== Format ==
On 24 September 2019, UEFA announced that a revised format would be used for the 2020–21 edition, the second season of the competition. The 55 UEFA national teams were divided into four leagues, with Leagues A, B and C featuring sixteen teams each, divided into four groups of four teams. League D featured seven teams divided into two groups, with one containing four teams and the other containing three. The teams were allocated to leagues based on the 2018–19 UEFA Nations League overall ranking. Each team now played six matches within their group, except for one group in League D that played four, using the home-and-away round-robin format on double matchdays in September, October, and November 2020. This format ensured that for almost all groups, teams in the same group played their last matches at the same time. It also increased the number of total league phase matches from 138 to 162 and minimized the number of friendly matches.

In the top division, League A, teams competed to become the UEFA Nations League champions. The four group winners of League A qualified for the Nations League Finals, which was played in a knockout format consisting of the semi-finals, third place play-off, and final. The semi-final pairings were determined using an open draw. Host country Italy was selected among the four qualified teams by the UEFA Executive Committee, with the winners of the final crowned as the Nations League champions. The video assistant referee (VAR) system was used in the Nations League Finals.

Teams also competed for promotion and relegation to a higher or lower league. The group winners from Leagues B, C, and D were promoted, while the last-placed teams of each group in Leagues A and B were relegated. As League C had four groups while League D had only two, the two League C teams that were to be relegated were determined by play-outs in March 2022. Based on the Nations League overall ranking of the fourth-placed teams, the first-ranked team faced the fourth-ranked team and the second-ranked team faced the third-ranked team. Two ties were played over two legs, with the higher-ranked team hosting the second leg. The team that scored more goals on aggregate over the two legs remained in League C, while the loser was relegated to League D. If the aggregate score was level, extra time was played (the away goals rule was not applied). If still tied after extra time, a penalty shoot-out was used to decide the winner. The away goals rule was originally to be used but was abolished by the UEFA Executive Committee on 16 December 2021.

== Tiebreakers ==
=== Tiebreakers for group ranking ===
If two or more teams in the same group were equal on points on completion of the league phase, the following tie-breaking criteria were applied:

1. Higher number of points obtained in the matches played among the teams in question;
2. Superior goal difference in matches played among the teams in question;
3. Higher number of goals scored in the matches played among the teams in question;
4. Higher number of goals scored away from home in the matches played among the teams in question;
5. If, after having applied criteria 1 to 4, teams still had an equal ranking, criteria 1 to 4 were reapplied exclusively to the matches between the teams in question to determine their final rankings. (Note: When there were two or more teams tied in points, criteria 1 to 4 were applied. After these criteria were applied, they may have defined the position of some of the teams involved, but not all of them. For example, if there was a three-way tie on points, the application of the first four criteria may only have broken the tie for one of the teams, leaving the other two teams still tied. In this case, the tiebreaking procedure was resumed, from the beginning, for those teams that were still tied.) If this procedure did not lead to a decision, criteria 6 to 10 applied;
6. Superior goal difference in all group matches;
7. Higher number of goals scored in all group matches;
8. Higher number of away goals scored in all group matches;
9. Higher number of wins in all group matches;
10. Higher number of away wins in all group matches;
11. Lower disciplinary points total in all group matches (1 point for a single yellow card, 3 points for a red card as a consequence of two yellow cards, 3 points for a direct red card, 4 points for a yellow card followed by a direct red card).
12. Position in the 2020–21 UEFA Nations League access list.

=== Criteria for league ranking ===
Individual league rankings were established according to the following criteria:

1. Position in the group;
2. Higher number of points;
3. Superior goal difference;
4. Higher number of goals scored;
5. Higher number of goals scored away from home;
6. Higher number of wins;
7. Higher number of wins away from home;
8. Lower disciplinary points total (1 point for a single yellow card, 3 points for a red card as a consequence of two yellow cards, 3 points for a direct red card, 4 points for a yellow card followed by a direct red card).
9. Position in the 2020–21 UEFA Nations League access list.

To rank teams in League D, which was composed of different-sized groups, the results against the fourth-placed team in Group D1 were not taken into account to compare teams placed first, second, and third in their respective groups.

The ranking of the top four teams in League A was determined by their finish in the Nations League Finals (first to fourth).

=== Criteria for overall ranking ===
The overall UEFA Nations League rankings were established as follows:

1. The 16 League A teams were ranked 1st to 16th according to their league rankings.
2. The 16 League B teams were ranked 17th to 32nd according to their league rankings.
3. The 16 League C teams were ranked 33rd to 48th according to their league rankings.
4. The 7 League D teams were ranked 49th to 55th according to their league rankings.

=== 2022 FIFA World Cup qualification ===
The Nations League was partially linked with European qualification for the 2022 FIFA World Cup in Qatar, with the format confirmed by the UEFA Executive Committee during their meeting in Nyon, Switzerland on 4 December 2019. The qualifying structure depended on results from the Nations League, although to a lesser degree than the UEFA Euro 2020 qualifying play-offs. The ten group winners after the first round (group stage) qualified directly for the World Cup. Then, the second round (play-offs) was contested by the ten group runners-up, along with the best two Nations League group winners, based on the Nations League overall ranking, that finished outside the top two of their qualifying group. The play-offs were split into three play-off paths, played in two single-match knockout rounds (semi-finals and finals, with the home teams to be drawn), from which an additional three teams also qualified.

=== Effects of the COVID-19 pandemic ===
Due to the COVID-19 pandemic in Europe, the UEFA Executive Committee approved on 28 August 2020 the following principles for the league phase of the 2020–21 UEFA Nations League:

- If a team could not field the minimum required number of players (at least 13 players including at least one goalkeeper) due to positive SARS-CoV-2 tests and the match could not be rescheduled, the team responsible for the match not taking place were considered to have forfeited the match and lost 0–3.
- If UEFA came to the conclusion that both or none of the teams were responsible for the match not taking place, the outcome of the match was decided by drawing of lots of either one team winning 1-0 or a goalless draw carried out by the UEFA administration.

On 24 September 2020, UEFA announced that five substitutions would be permitted in Nations League matches during the October and November 2020 international windows. On 31 March 2021, the use of five substitutes was extended to the Nations League Finals in October 2021 and the League C relegation play-outs in March 2022, with these knockout matches permitting a sixth substitution should the match go to extra time. However, each team was only given three opportunities to make substitutions during matches, excluding substitutions made at half-time, before the start of extra time and at half-time in extra time. During the September 2020 window, only three substitutions had been permitted.

All matches played in September 2020 were required by UEFA to be held behind closed doors due to the COVID-19 pandemic in Europe. On 1 October 2020, UEFA announced the partial return of spectators to matches beginning in October 2020, restricted to a maximum of 30 percent of the respective stadium capacity. However, the return of spectators was subject to the decision of local authorities, with regional limits taking precedence over UEFA's maximum allowed capacity. Away supporters were not allowed at the venues. Social distancing was mandatory for spectators and additional precautionary measures (such as face masks) were implemented per local regulations.

== Schedule ==
Below was the schedule of the 2020–21 UEFA Nations League.

The Nations League Finals, originally scheduled for 2–6 June 2021, were moved to October 2021 following the rescheduling of UEFA Euro 2020 to June and July 2021 due to the COVID-19 pandemic. The scheduling of the league phase was reviewed by the UEFA Executive Committee during their meeting on 17 June 2020. At the meeting, UEFA decided to adjust the match schedule for October and November 2020 in order for an additional match to be played in each window. This allowed for the UEFA Euro 2020 qualifying play-offs, along with the postponed March 2020 international friendlies, to be played on 7–8 October and 11–12 November 2020. Therefore, matchdays 3–6, which originally would spread over three days each during 8–13 October and 12–17 November 2020, would now spread over only two days. The changes to the International Match Calendar for October and November 2020, which extended each window by one day, were approved by the FIFA Council on 25 June 2020.

Stage	Round	Dates
League phase	Matchday 1	3–5 September 2020
League phase	Matchday 2	6–8 September 2020
League phase	Matchday 3	10–11 October 2020
League phase	Matchday 4	13–14 October 2020
League phase	Matchday 5	14–15 November 2020
League phase	Matchday 6	17–18 November 2020
Finals	Semi-finals	6–7 October 2021
Finals	Third place play-off	10 October 2021
Finals	Final	10 October 2021
Relegation play-outs	First leg	24 March 2022
Relegation play-outs	Second leg	29 March 2022

The original fixture list was confirmed by UEFA on 3 March 2020 following the draw. However, due to the change of the league phase calendar, a revised schedule for the October and November 2020 fixtures was released by UEFA on 26 June 2020.

The relegation play-outs of League C were scheduled on the same dates as the 2022 FIFA World Cup qualifying play-offs. If one or more of the teams due to participate in the relegation play-outs had also qualified for the World Cup qualifying play-offs, the relegation play-outs would have been cancelled and the teams in League C ranked 47th and 48th in the Nations League overall ranking would have been automatically relegated.

== Seeding ==
Map showing the leagues each national team is participating in. League A League B League C League D

All 55 UEFA national teams entered the competition. Due to the format change of the competition, no teams were actually relegated from the 2018–19 season. In addition to the group winners, the second-placed teams in Leagues C and D, along with the best-ranked third-placed team of League D, were also promoted.

In the 2020–21 access list, UEFA ranked teams based on the 2018–19 Nations League overall ranking, with a slight modification: teams that were originally relegated in the previous season were ranked immediately below teams promoted prior to the format change. The seeding pots for the league phase were based on the access list ranking. The seeding pots, draw procedure and fixture list procedures were confirmed by the UEFA Executive Committee during their meeting in Nyon, Switzerland on 4 December 2019. All teams promoted to a higher tier made their debut appearance at that level.

Key
▲	Originally promoted in previous season (prior to format change)
†	Originally relegated in previous season (spared after format change)
▲†	Promoted after format change

League A
Pot	Team	Prv	Rank
1	Portugal (title holders)		1
1	Netherlands		2
1	England		3
1	Switzerland		4
2	Belgium		5
2	France		6
2	Spain		7
2	Italy		8
3	Bosnia and Herzegovina	▲	9
3	Ukraine	▲	10
3	Denmark	▲	11
3	Sweden	▲	12
4	Croatia	†	13
4	Poland	†	14
4	Germany	†	15
4	Iceland	†	16

League C
Pot	Team	Prv	Rank
1	Greece		33
1	Albania		34
1	Montenegro		35
1	Georgia	▲	36
2	North Macedonia	▲	37
2	Kosovo	▲	38
2	Belarus	▲	39
2	Cyprus	†	40
3	Estonia	†	41
3	Slovenia	†	42
3	Lithuania	†	43
3	Luxembourg	▲†	44
4	Armenia	▲†	45
4	Azerbaijan	▲†	46
4	Kazakhstan	▲†	47
4	Moldova	▲†	48

League B
Pot	Team	Prv	Rank
1	Russia		17
1	Austria		18
1	Wales		19
1	Czech Republic		20
2	Scotland	▲	21
2	Norway	▲	22
2	Serbia	▲	23
2	Finland	▲	24
3	Slovakia	†	25
3	Turkey	†	26
3	Republic of Ireland	†	27
3	Northern Ireland	†	28
4	Bulgaria	▲†	29
4	Israel	▲†	30
4	Hungary	▲†	31
4	Romania	▲†	32

League D
Pot	Team	Rank
1	Gibraltar	49
1	Faroe Islands	50
1	Latvia	51
1	Liechtenstein	52
2	Andorra	53
2	Malta	54
2	San Marino	55

The draw for the league phase took place at the Beurs van Berlage Conference Centre in Amsterdam, Netherlands on 3 March 2020, 18:00 CET. While the draw typically had restrictions for prohibited clashes, winter venues and excessive travel, no conditions applied to the draw given the allocation of the teams to both leagues and pots.

== League A ==
=== Group A1 ===
Pos	Team	Pld	W	D	L	GF	GA	GD	Pts	Qualification or relegation	(Italy)	(Netherlands)	(Poland)	(Bosnia and Herzegovina)
1	Italy	6	3	3	0	7	2	+5	12	Qualification for Nations League Finals	—	1–1	2–0	1–1
2	Netherlands	6	3	2	1	7	4	+3	11		0–1	—	1–0	3–1
3	Poland	6	2	1	3	6	6	0	7		0–0	1–2	—	3–0
4	Bosnia and Herzegovina (R)	6	0	2	4	3	11	−8	2	Relegation to League B	0–2	0–0	1–2	—

Source: UEFA
(R) Relegated

=== Group A2 ===
Pos	Team	Pld	W	D	L	GF	GA	GD	Pts	Qualification or relegation	(Belgium)	(Denmark)	(England)	(Iceland)
1	Belgium	6	5	0	1	16	6	+10	15	Qualification for Nations League Finals	—	4–2	2–0	5–1
2	Denmark	6	3	1	2	8	7	+1	10 (Note: Head-to-head points: Denmark 4, England 1.)		0–2	—	0–0	2–1
3	England	6	3	1	2	7	4	+3	10		2–1	0–1	—	4–0
4	Iceland (R)	6	0	0	6	3	17	−14	0	Relegation to League B	1–2	0–3	0–1	—

Source: UEFA
(R) Relegated

=== Group A3 ===
Pos	Team	Pld	W	D	L	GF	GA	GD	Pts	Qualification or relegation	(France)	(Portugal)	(Croatia)	(Sweden)
1	France	6	5	1	0	12	5	+7	16	Qualification for Nations League Finals	—	0–0	4–2	4–2
2	Portugal	6	4	1	1	12	4	+8	13		0–1	—	4–1	3–0
3	Croatia	6	1	0	5	9	16	−7	3 (Note: Tied on head-to-head results. Overall goal difference was used as the tiebreaker.)		1–2	2–3	—	2–1
4	Sweden (R)	6	1	0	5	5	13	−8	3	Relegation to League B	0–1	0–2	2–1	—

Source: UEFA
(R) Relegated

=== Group A4 ===
Pos	Team	Pld	W	D	L	GF	GA	GD	Pts	Qualification or relegation	(Spain)	(Germany)	(Switzerland)	(Ukraine)
1	Spain	6	3	2	1	13	3	+10	11	Qualification for Nations League Finals	—	6–0	1–0	4–0
2	Germany	6	2	3	1	10	13	−3	9		1–1	—	3–3	3–1
3	Switzerland	6	1	3	2	9	8	+1	6 (Note: Tied on head-to-head points (3). Head-to-head goal difference: Switzerland +2, Ukraine −2.)		1–1	1–1	—	3–0 (Note: The Switzerland v Ukraine match was awarded as a 3–0 win to Switzerland after being cancelled as Ukraine were placed in quarantine prior to the match due to positive SARS-CoV-2 tests in the team.)
4	Ukraine (R)	6	2	0	4	5	13	−8	6	Relegation to League B	1–0	1–2	2–1	—

Source: UEFA
(R) Relegated

=== Nations League Finals ===
The host of the Nations League Finals, Italy, was selected from the four qualified teams. The semi-final pairings were determined by means of an open draw on 3 December 2020, 17:30 CET, at the UEFA headquarters in Nyon, Switzerland. For scheduling purposes, the host team was allocated to semi-final 1 as the administrative home team.

Times are CEST (UTC+2), as listed by UEFA.

==== Bracket ====
Semi-finals
6 October – Milan
Italy	1
Spain	2
7 October – Turin
Belgium	2
France	3

Final
10 October – Milan
Spain	1
France	2
Third place play-off
10 October – Turin
Italy	2
Belgium	1

==== Semi-finals ====
6 October 2021
20:45

Italy	1–2	Spain
Pellegrini 83'	Report	F. Torres 17', 45+2'

San Siro, Milan
Attendance: 33,524
Referee: Sergei Karasev (Russia)

7 October 2021
20:45

Belgium	2–3	France
Carrasco 37'; Lukaku 40'	Report	Benzema 62'; Mbappé 69' (pen.); T. Hernandez 90'

Juventus Stadium, Turin
Attendance: 12,409
Referee: Daniel Siebert (Germany)

==== Third-place play-off ====
10 October 2021
15:00

Italy	2–1	Belgium
Barella 46'; Berardi 65' (pen.)	Report	De Ketelaere 86'

Juventus Stadium, Turin
Attendance: 16,724
Referee: Srđan Jovanović (Serbia)

==== Final ====
10 October 2021
20:45

Spain	1–2	France
Oyarzabal 64'	Report	Benzema 66'; Mbappé 80'

San Siro, Milan
Attendance: 31,511
Referee: Anthony Taylor (England)

=== Top goalscorers ===
There were 143 goals scored in 51 matches, for an average of 2.8 goals per match.

League A top goalscorers
Rank	Player	Goals
1	(Belgium) Romelu Lukaku	6
1	(Spain) Ferran Torres	6
3	(Denmark) Christian Eriksen	4
3	(France) Kylian Mbappé	4
3	(Germany) Timo Werner	4
6	(Belgium) Dries Mertens	3
6	(France) Olivier Giroud	3
6	(Italy) Domenico Berardi	3
6	(Netherlands) Georginio Wijnaldum	3
6	(Portugal) Diogo Jota	3
6	(Spain) Mikel Oyarzabal	3

== League B ==
=== Group B1 ===
Pos	Team	Pld	W	D	L	GF	GA	GD	Pts	Promotion or relegation	(Austria)	(Norway)	(Romania)	(Northern Ireland)
1	Austria (P)	6	4	1	1	9	6	+3	13	Promotion to League A	—	1–1	2–3	2–1
2	Norway	6	3	1	2	12	7	+5	10		1–2	—	4–0	1–0
3	Romania	6	2	2	2	8	9	−1	8		0–1	3–0 (Note: The Romania v Norway match was awarded as a 3–0 win to Romania after being cancelled as Norway could not travel to the match due to a positive SARS-CoV-2 test in the team.)	—	1–1
4	Northern Ireland (R)	6	0	2	4	4	11	−7	2	Relegation to League C	0–1	1–5	1–1	—

Source: UEFA
(P) Promoted; (R) Relegated

=== Group B2 ===
Pos	Team	Pld	W	D	L	GF	GA	GD	Pts	Promotion or relegation	(Czech Republic)	(Scotland)	(Israel)	(Slovakia)
1	Czech Republic (P)	6	4	0	2	9	5	+4	12	Promotion to League A	—	1–2	1–0	2–0
2	Scotland	6	3	1	2	5	4	+1	10		1–0	—	1–1	1–0
3	Israel	6	2	2	2	7	7	0	8		1–2	1–0	—	1–1
4	Slovakia (R)	6	1	1	4	5	10	−5	4	Relegation to League C	1–3	1–0	2–3	—

Source: UEFA
(P) Promoted; (R) Relegated

=== Group B3 ===
Pos	Team	Pld	W	D	L	GF	GA	GD	Pts	Promotion or relegation	(Hungary)	(Russia)	(Serbia)	(Turkey)
1	Hungary (P)	6	3	2	1	7	4	+3	11	Promotion to League A	—	2–3	1–1	2–0
2	Russia	6	2	2	2	9	12	−3	8		0–0	—	3–1	1–1
3	Serbia	6	1	3	2	9	7	+2	6 (Note: Tied on head-to-head points (2) and head-to-head goal difference (0). Head-to-head away goals: Serbia 2, Turkey 0.)		0–1	5–0	—	0–0
4	Turkey (R)	6	1	3	2	6	8	−2	6	Relegation to League C	0–1	3–2	2–2	—

Source: UEFA
(P) Promoted; (R) Relegated

=== Group B4 ===
Pos	Team	Pld	W	D	L	GF	GA	GD	Pts	Promotion or relegation	(Wales)	(Finland)	(Republic of Ireland)	(Bulgaria)
1	Wales (P)	6	5	1	0	7	1	+6	16	Promotion to League A	—	3–1	1–0	1–0
2	Finland	6	4	0	2	7	5	+2	12		0–1	—	1–0	2–0
3	Republic of Ireland	6	0	3	3	1	4	−3	3		0–0	0–1	—	0–0
4	Bulgaria (R)	6	0	2	4	2	7	−5	2	Relegation to League C	0–1	1–2	1–1	—

Source: UEFA
(P) Promoted; (R) Relegated

=== Top goalscorers ===
There were 104 goals scored in 47 matches, for an average of 2.21 goals per match.

League B top goalscorers
Rank	Player	Goals
1	(Norway) Erling Haaland	6
2	(Israel) Eran Zahavi	5
3	(Finland) Fredrik Jensen	3
3	(Norway) Alexander Sørloth	3
5	12 players	2

== League C ==
=== Group C1 ===
Pos	Team	Pld	W	D	L	GF	GA	GD	Pts	Promotion or qualification	(Montenegro)	(Luxembourg)	(Azerbaijan)	(Cyprus)
1	Montenegro (P)	6	4	1	1	10	2	+8	13	Promotion to League B	—	1–2	2–0	4–0
2	Luxembourg	6	3	1	2	7	5	+2	10		0–1	—	0–0	2–0
3	Azerbaijan	6	1	3	2	2	4	−2	6		0–0	1–2	—	0–0
4	Cyprus (O)	6	1	1	4	2	10	−8	4	Qualification to relegation play-outs	0–2	2–1	0–1	—

Source: UEFA
(O) Play-off winners; (P) Promoted

=== Group C2 ===
Pos	Team	Pld	W	D	L	GF	GA	GD	Pts	Promotion or qualification	(Armenia)	(North Macedonia)	(Georgia (country))	(Estonia)
1	Armenia (P)	6	3	2	1	9	6	+3	11	Promotion to League B	—	1–0	2–2	2–0
2	North Macedonia	6	2	3	1	9	8	+1	9		2–1	—	1–1	2–1
3	Georgia	6	1	4	1	6	6	0	7		1–2	1–1	—	0–0
4	Estonia (R)	6	0	3	3	5	9	−4	3	Qualification to relegation play-outs	1–1	3–3	0–1	—

Source: UEFA
(P) Promoted; (R) Relegated

=== Group C3 ===
Pos	Team	Pld	W	D	L	GF	GA	GD	Pts	Promotion or qualification	(Slovenia)	(Greece)	(Kosovo)	(Moldova)
1	Slovenia (P)	6	4	2	0	8	1	+7	14	Promotion to League B	—	0–0	2–1	1–0
2	Greece	6	3	3	0	6	1	+5	12		0–0	—	0–0	2–0
3	Kosovo	6	1	2	3	4	6	−2	5		0–1	1–2	—	1–0
4	Moldova (R)	6	0	1	5	1	11	−10	1	Qualification to relegation play-outs	0–4	0–2	1–1	—

Source: UEFA
(P) Promoted; (R) Relegated

=== Group C4 ===
Pos	Team	Pld	W	D	L	GF	GA	GD	Pts	Promotion or qualification	(Albania)	(Belarus)	(Lithuania)	(Kazakhstan)
1	Albania (P)	6	3	2	1	8	4	+4	11	Promotion to League B	—	3–2	0–1	3–1
2	Belarus	6	3	1	2	10	8	+2	10		0–2	—	2–0	2–0
3	Lithuania	6	2	2	2	5	7	−2	8		0–0	2–2	—	0–2
4	Kazakhstan (O)	6	1	1	4	5	9	−4	4	Qualification to relegation play-outs	0–0	1–2	1–2	—

Source: UEFA
(O) Play-off winners; (P) Promoted

=== Relegation play-outs ===
Team 1	Agg.	Team 2	1st leg	2nd leg
Moldova	2–2 (4–5 p)	Kazakhstan	1–2	1–0 (a.e.t.)
Estonia	0–2	Cyprus	0–0	0–2

=== Top goalscorers ===
There were 103 goals scored in 52 matches, for an average of 1.98 goals per match.

League C top goalscorers
Rank	Player	Goals
1	(Albania) Sokol Cikalleshi	4
1	(Estonia) Rauno Sappinen	4
1	(Montenegro) Stevan Jovetić	4
1	(Slovenia) Haris Vučkić	4
5	(Luxembourg) Danel Sinani	3
6	14 players	2

== League D ==
=== Group D1 ===
Pos	Team	Pld	W	D	L	GF	GA	GD	Pts	Promotion	(Faroe Islands)	(Malta)	(Latvia)	(Andorra)
1	Faroe Islands (P)	6	3	3	0	9	5	+4	12	Promotion to League C	—	3–2	1–1	2–0
2	Malta	6	2	3	1	8	6	+2	9		1–1	—	1–1	3–1
3	Latvia	6	1	4	1	8	4	+4	7		1–1	0–1	—	0–0
4	Andorra	6	0	2	4	1	11	−10	2		0–1	0–0	0–5	—

Source: UEFA
(P) Promoted

=== Group D2 ===
Pos	Team	Pld	W	D	L	GF	GA	GD	Pts	Promotion	(Gibraltar)	(Liechtenstein)	(San Marino)
1	Gibraltar (P)	4	2	2	0	3	1	+2	8	Promotion to League C	—	1–1	1–0
2	Liechtenstein	4	1	2	1	3	2	+1	5		0–1	—	0–0
3	San Marino	4	0	2	2	0	3	−3	2		0–0	0–2	—

Source: UEFA
(P) Promoted

=== Top goalscorers ===
There were 32 goals scored in 18 matches, for an average of 1.78 goals per match.

League D top goalscorers
Rank	Player	Goals
1	(Faroe Islands) Klæmint Olsen	4
2	(Latvia) Jānis Ikaunieks	3
3	(Malta) Jurgen Degabriele	2
4	20 players	1

== Overall ranking ==
The results of each team were used to calculate the overall ranking of the competition.

League A
League B

Rnk	Team	Pld	Pts
1	France	6	16
2	Spain	6	11
3	Italy	6	12
4	Belgium	6	15
5	Portugal	6	13
6	Netherlands	6	11
7	Denmark	6	10
8	Germany	6	9
9	England	6	10
10	Poland	6	7
11	Switzerland	6	6
12	Croatia	6	3
13	Ukraine	6	6
14	Sweden	6	3
15	Bosnia and Herzegovina	6	2
16	Iceland	6	0

Source: UEFA

Rnk	Team	Pld	Pts
17	Wales	6	16
18	Austria	6	13
19	Czech Republic	6	12
20	Hungary	6	11
21	Finland	6	12
22	Norway	6	10
23	Scotland	6	10
24	Russia	6	8
25	Israel	6	8
26	Romania	6	8
27	Serbia	6	6
28	Republic of Ireland	6	3
29	Turkey	6	6
30	Slovakia	6	4
31	Bulgaria	6	2
32	Northern Ireland	6	2

Source: UEFA
League C
League D

Rnk	Team	Pld	Pts
33	Slovenia	6	14
34	Montenegro	6	13
35	Albania	6	11
36	Armenia	6	11
37	Greece	6	12
38	Belarus	6	10
39	Luxembourg	6	10
40	North Macedonia	6	9
41	Lithuania	6	8
42	Georgia	6	7
43	Azerbaijan	6	6
44	Kosovo	6	5
45	Kazakhstan	6	4
46	Cyprus	6	4
47	Estonia	6	3
48	Moldova	6	1

Source: UEFA

Rnk	Team	Pld	Pts
49	Gibraltar	4	8
50	Faroe Islands	4	6
51	Liechtenstein	4	5
52	Malta	4	5
53	Latvia	4	3
54	San Marino	4	2
55	Andorra	6	2

Source: UEFA

== 2022 World Cup qualification play-offs ==
The best two Nations League group winners based on the overall ranking that finished outside the top two of their World Cup qualifying group joined the ten group runners-up in the World Cup qualification second round (play-offs).

UNL	Rank	UNL group winner	Qualifying group
A	1	France ^{&}	D
A	2	Spain ^{&}	B
A	3	Italy ^{†}	C
A	4	Belgium ^{&}	E
B	17	Wales ^{†}	E
B	18	Austria ^{‡}	F
B	19	Czech Republic ^{‡}	E
B	20	Hungary	I
C	33	Slovenia	H
C	34	Montenegro	G
C	35	Albania	I
C	36	Armenia	J
D	49	Gibraltar	G
D	50	Faroe Islands	F

Key

- & Team qualified directly for World Cup as qualifying group winner
- † Team advanced to the play-offs as qualifying group runner-up
- ‡ Team (in **bold**) advanced to the play-offs as one of the best two Nations League group winners outside top two of their qualifying group
