= 2021 UEFA Nations League final =

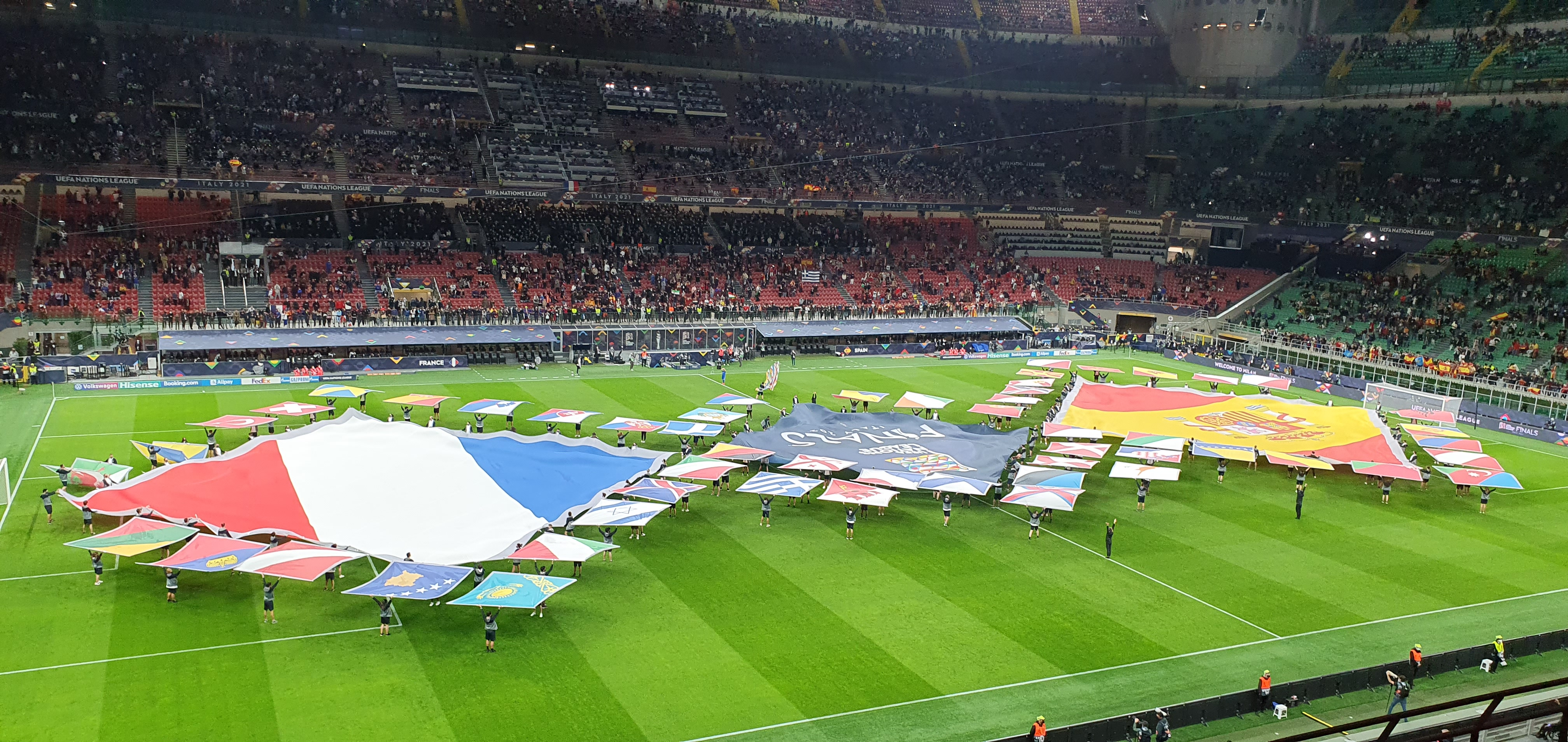
- Pre-show at the final in San Siro, Milan.
- Event: 2021 UEFA Nations League Finals
Spain	France
1	2
- Date: 10 October 2021
- Venue: San Siro, Milan
- Man of the Match: Karim Benzema (France)
- Referee: Anthony Taylor (England)
- Attendance: 31,511
- Weather: Clear night 12 °C (54 °F); 57% humidity

The 2021 UEFA Nations League final was a football match that determined the winners of the final tournament of the 2020–21 UEFA Nations League. It was the second final of the international football competition involving the men's national teams of the member associations of UEFA. The match was held on 10 October 2021 at the San Siro in Milan, Italy, and was contested by Spain and France.

France won the match 2–1 for their first UEFA Nations League title.

== Venue ==
The final was played at the San Siro in Milan, home to Milan and Inter Milan.

== Background ==
The match was the 36th meeting between the two rivals. They had met in the UEFA Euro 1984 final, which France won 2–0.

=== Previous finals ===
Team	Previous final appearances
Spain	None
France	None

== Route to the final ==
Note: In all results below, the score of the finalist is given first (H: home; A: away).

Spain
Round
France
Opponents
Result
League phase
Opponents
Result
Germany
1–1 (A)
Match 1
Sweden
1–0 (A)
Ukraine
4–0 (H)
Match 2
Croatia
4–2 (H)
Switzerland
1–0 (H)
Match 3
Portugal
0–0 (H)
Ukraine
0–1 (A)
Match 4
Croatia
2–1 (A)
Switzerland
1–1 (A)
Match 5
Portugal
1–0 (A)
Germany
6–0 (H)
Match 6
Sweden
4–2 (H)
Group A4 winner

Pos	Team	Pld	Pts
1	Spain	6	11
2	Germany	6	9
3	Switzerland	6	6
4	Ukraine (R)	6	6

Source: UEFA
(R) Relegated
Final standings
Group A3 winner

Pos	Team	Pld	Pts
1	France	6	16
2	Portugal	6	13
3	Croatia	6	3
4	Sweden (R)	6	3

Source: UEFA
(R) Relegated
Opponents
Result
Nations League Finals
Opponents
Result
Italy
2–1
Semi-finals
Belgium
3–2

== Pre-match ==
=== Officials ===
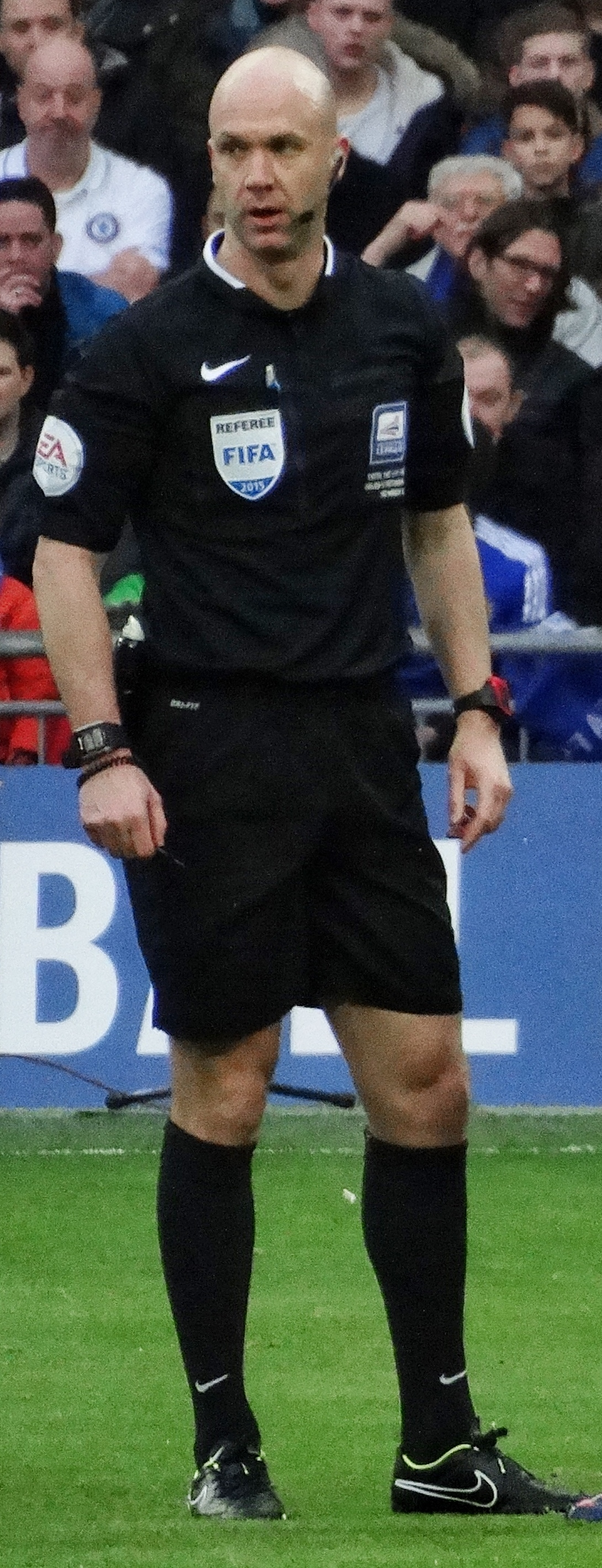
Englishman Anthony Taylor was selected as the referee for the final.

On 8 October 2021, the UEFA Referees Committee announced the officiating team for the final, led by 42-year-old English referee Anthony Taylor of the Football Association. He was joined by seven of his compatriots, including assistant referees Gary Beswick and Adam Nunn. Craig Pawson served as the fourth official, while Stuart Burt was selected as the reserve assistant referee. At UEFA headquarters in Nyon, Switzerland, Stuart Attwell worked as the video assistant referee (VAR) for the match. Chris Kavanagh and Lee Betts were appointed as assistant VAR officials, along with Dutchman Pol van Boekel.

Taylor has been a FIFA referee since 2013. The match was his third UEFA final as lead referee, having officiated the 2015 UEFA European Under-19 Championship final and the 2020 UEFA Super Cup. He also was selected as a referee at UEFA Euro 2020, where he officiated three matches. He previously served as an additional assistant referee at UEFA Euro 2016, including the final, as well as in the 2015 UEFA Europa League final and 2016 UEFA Champions League Final. Domestically, he officiated the FA Cup final in 2017 and 2020, the Football League Cup final in 2015, and the FA Community Shield in 2015. The final was the fourth time Taylor had refereed Spain (two wins and one loss) and the third for France (one win and one loss).

=== Team selection ===
Spain had all their players available for selection. However, Ferran Torres was a doubt with an ankle issue which required him to be substituted out of Spain's semi-final against Italy and miss Spain's final training session. France had two players missing, after left-back Lucas Digne left the squad due to a muscle injury, while midfielder Adrien Rabiot testing positive for SARS‑CoV‑2.

Both teams made two changes to their starting line-ups after their semi-final victories. Spain replaced centre-back Pau Torres with Eric García and midfielder Koke with Rodri, while France replaced centre-back Lucas Hernandez with Presnel Kimpembe and COVID-positive Rabiot with Aurélien Tchouaméni.

== Match ==
=== Summary ===
After a goalless first half, Mikel Oyarzabal put Spain into the lead after 64 minutes with a low finish from the left to the bottom right corner of the net after a pass from Sergio Busquets which French defender Dayot Upamecano failed to cut out. This goal came seconds after Théo Hernandez shot against the underside of the crossbar for France. Two minutes later Karim Benzema scored to make it 1–1, cutting in from the left to the edge of the penalty area before shooting to the top right corner of the net past Unai Simón who managed to get a touch on the ball but could not prevent it going into the net. With ten minutes remaining Kylian Mbappé got the winning goal when he received the ball from Théo Hernandez before shooting low under the advancing goalkeeper Simón from the left. Mbappé was initially in an offside position from the pass but as the ball was deflected into his path by Eric García he became onside and so the goal was given.

=== Details ===
10 October 2021
20:45 UTC+2

Spain	1–2	France
Oyarzabal 64'	Report	Benzema 66'; Mbappé 80'

San Siro, Milan
Attendance: 31,511
Referee: Anthony Taylor (England)

Spain	France

GK	23	Unai Simón
RB	2	César Azpilicueta
CB	19	Aymeric Laporte	(yellow card) 86'
CB	12	Eric García
LB	17	Marcos Alonso
CM	9	Gavi		(substituted off) 75'
CM	5	Sergio Busquets (c)
CM	16	Rodri		(substituted off) 84'
RF	11	Ferran Torres		(substituted off) 84'
CF	22	Pablo Sarabia		(substituted off) 61'
LF	21	Mikel Oyarzabal
Substitutions:
FW	7	Yeremy Pino		(substituted on) 61'
MF	8	Koke		(substituted on) 75'
MF	20	Mikel Merino		(substituted on) 84'
MF	18	Pablo Fornals		(substituted on) 84'
Manager:
Luis Enrique

GK	1	Hugo Lloris (c)
CB	5	Jules Koundé	(yellow card) 55'
CB	4	Raphaël Varane		(substituted off) 43'
CB	3	Presnel Kimpembe
RWB	2	Benjamin Pavard		(substituted off) 79'
LWB	22	Théo Hernandez
CM	6	Paul Pogba	(yellow card) 46'
CM	8	Aurélien Tchouaméni
AM	7	Antoine Griezmann		(substituted off) 90+2'
CF	19	Karim Benzema
CF	10	Kylian Mbappé	(yellow card) 90'
Substitutions:
DF	15	Dayot Upamecano		(substituted on) 43'
DF	12	Léo Dubois		(substituted on) 79'
MF	17	Jordan Veretout		(substituted on) 90+2'
Manager:
Didier Deschamps

Man of the Match:
Karim Benzema (France)

Assistant referees:
Gary Beswick (England)
Adam Nunn (England)
Fourth official:
Craig Pawson (England)
Reserve assistant referee:
Stuart Burt (England)
Video assistant referee:
Stuart Attwell (England)
Assistant video assistant referees:
Chris Kavanagh (England)
Lee Betts (England)
Pol van Boekel (Netherlands)

Match rules

- 90 minutes
- 30 minutes of extra time if necessary
- Penalty shoot-out if scores still level
- Maximum of twelve named substitutes
- Maximum of five substitutions, with a sixth allowed in extra time (Note: Each team was given only three opportunities to make substitutions, with a fourth opportunity in extra time, excluding substitutions made at half-time, before the start of extra time and at half-time in extra time.)

=== Statistics ===
First half
Statistic	Spain	France
Goals scored	0	0
Total shots	2	1
Shots on target	1	0
Saves	0	1
Ball possession	65%	35%
Corner kicks	2	2
Fouls committed	5	6
Offsides	0	1
Yellow cards	0	0
Red cards	0	0

Second half
Statistic	Spain	France
Goals scored	1	2
Total shots	10	11
Shots on target	3	5
Saves	3	2
Ball possession	56%	44%
Corner kicks	5	3
Fouls committed	6	8
Offsides	0	1
Yellow cards	1	3
Red cards	0	0

Overall
Statistic	Spain	France
Goals scored	1	2
Total shots	12	12
Shots on target	4	5
Saves	3	3
Ball possession	60%	40%
Corner kicks	7	5
Fouls committed	11	14
Offsides	0	2
Yellow cards	1	3
Red cards	0	0
