= 2021 UEFA Nations League Finals =

Football tournament

Fase finale della UEFA Nations League 2021 (in Italian)

Tournament details
- Host country: Italy
- Dates: 6–10 October
- Teams: 4
- Venue: 2 (in 2 host cities)

Final positions
- Champions: France (1st title)
- Runners-up: Spain
- Third place: Italy
- Fourth place: Belgium

Tournament statistics
- Matches played: 4
- Goals scored: 14 (3.5 per match)
- Attendance: 94,168 (23,542 per match)
- Top scorer(s): (France) Karim Benzema (France) Kylian Mbappé (Spain) Ferran Torres (2 goals each)
- Best player: (Spain) Sergio Busquets

The 2021 UEFA Nations League Finals was the final tournament of the 2020–21 edition of the UEFA Nations League, the second season of the international football competition involving the men's national teams of the 55 member associations of UEFA. The tournament was held in Italy from 6 to 10 October 2021, and was contested by the four group winners of Nations League A. The tournament consisted of two semi-finals, a third place play-off and final to determine the champions of the UEFA Nations League. While originally scheduled for 2 to 6 June 2021, the tournament was pushed back due to the postponement of UEFA Euro 2020 to June and July 2021.

Portugal were the defending champions, having won the inaugural 2019 finals. However, they failed to qualify for the 2021 finals after finishing second in their group behind France.

France won the final 2–1 against Spain for their first UEFA Nations League title.

== Format ==
The Nations League Finals took place in October 2021 and were contested by the four group winners of League A. The four teams were each drawn into a five-team group (rather than a six-team group) for the 2022 FIFA World Cup qualification group stage, thereby leaving the October 2021 window available for the Nations League Finals.

The Nations League Finals were played in single-leg knockout matches, consisting of two semi-finals, a third place play-off and a final. The semi-final pairings were determined by means of an open draw. All matches in the tournament utilised the goal-line technology and video assistant referee (VAR) systems.

In the Nations League Finals, if the scores were level at the end of normal time:

- In the semi-finals and final, 30 minutes of extra time would be played. If the score was still level after extra time, the winner would be determined by a penalty shoot-out.
- In the third place play-off, extra time would not be played, and the winner would be determined by a penalty shoot-out (this was a change from the 2019 finals, which utilized extra time in the third place play-off).

On 31 March 2021, the UEFA Executive Committee approved the use of a maximum of five substitutions in matches at the Nations League Finals (with a sixth allowed in extra time). However, each team was only given three opportunities to make substitutions, with a fourth opportunity allowed in extra time, excluding substitutions made at half-time, before the start of extra time and at half-time in extra time. The use of five substitutes had been permitted by IFAB during the COVID-19 pandemic due to the resulting fixture congestion, which created a greater burden on players.

== Qualified teams ==
The four group winners of League A qualified for the Nations League Finals.

Group	Winners	Date of qualification	Previous UNL Finals appearances	Previous best UNL Ranking	UNL Rankings November 2020	FIFA Rankings September 2021
A1	Italy (host)	18 November 2020	0 (debut)	8 (2018–19)	3	5
A2	Belgium	18 November 2020	0 (debut)	5 (2018–19)	2	1
A3	France	14 November 2020	0 (debut)	6 (2018–19)	1	4
A4	Spain	17 November 2020	0 (debut)	7 (2018–19)	4	8

== Schedule ==
The Nations League Finals, originally scheduled for 2–6 June 2021, were moved to 6–10 October 2021 following the rescheduling of UEFA Euro 2020 to June and July 2021 due to the COVID-19 pandemic. The tournament took place over five days, with the semi-finals on 6 and 7 October (the first of which featured the host team), and the third place play-off and final three days after the second semi-final on 10 October 2021.

== Host selection ==
Italy was confirmed as the host country by the UEFA Executive Committee during their meeting on 3 December 2020. Only League A teams could bid for the Nations League Finals, and only one of the four participants is selected as hosts. The Nations League Finals were held in two stadiums, each with a seating capacity of at least 30,000. Ideally, the stadiums would be located in the same host city or up to approximately 150 kilometres (93 mi) apart.

On 24 September 2020, UEFA announced that Italy, the Netherlands, and Poland had declared interest in hosting the tournament, all three of which are members of Group A1. Italy were confirmed as winners of Group A1 over the Netherlands and Poland on 18 November 2020, thereby confirming hosting rights, which were confirmed by the UEFA Executive Committee on 3 December 2020, the same day as the Nations League Finals draw. If the fourth member of the group, Bosnia and Herzegovina, had qualified for the Nations League Finals, the UEFA Executive Committee would have decided the venues.

Bidding venues

- Italy
  - San Siro, Milan
  - Juventus Stadium, Turin
- Netherlands
  - Johan Cruyff Arena, Amsterdam
  - De Kuip, Rotterdam
- Poland
  - Stadion Narodowy, Warsaw
  - Stadion Wojska Polskiego, Warsaw (potential second venue)
  - Stadion Śląski, Chorzów (potential second venue)
  - Stadion Miejski im. Henryka Reymana, Kraków (potential second venue)

== Venues ==
In their bid dossier, the Italian Football Federation proposed the San Siro in Milan and Juventus Stadium in Turin as the venues.

Milan	2021 UEFA Nations League Finals is located in Italy	Turin
San Siro	2021 UEFA Nations League Finals is located in Italy	Juventus Stadium
Capacity: 75,923	2021 UEFA Nations League Finals is located in Italy	Capacity: 41,507

== Draw ==
The semi-final pairings were determined by means of an open draw on 3 December 2020, 17:30 CET, at the UEFA headquarters in Nyon, Switzerland. The first two teams drawn were allocated to match pairing A, while the remaining two teams drawn were allocated to match pairing B. For scheduling purposes, the host team was allocated to the first semi-final as the administrative home team. The administrative home team for both the third place play-off and final were predetermined as the teams which advanced from semi-final 1.

== Squads ==
Each national team had to submit a squad of 23 players, three of whom had to be goalkeepers, at least ten days before the opening match of the tournament. If a player became injured or ill severely enough to prevent his participation in the tournament before his team's first match, he was replaced by another player.

== Bracket ==
Semi-finals
6 October – Milan
Italy	1
Spain	2
7 October – Turin
Belgium	2
France	3

Final
10 October – Milan
Spain	1
France	2
Third place play-off
10 October – Turin
Italy	2
Belgium	1

All times are local, CEST (UTC+2).

== Semi-finals ==
=== Italy vs Spain ===
6 October 2021
20:45

Italy	1–2	Spain
Pellegrini 83'	Report	F. Torres 17', 45+2'

San Siro, Milan
Attendance: 33,524
Referee: Sergei Karasev (Russia)

Italy	Spain

GK	21	Gianluigi Donnarumma
RB	2	Giovanni Di Lorenzo
CB	19	Leonardo Bonucci (c)	(yellow card) 30' (yellow-red card) 42'
CB	23	Alessandro Bastoni
LB	13	Emerson Palmieri
CM	18	Nicolò Barella		(substituted off) 72'
CM	8	Jorginho		(substituted off) 64'
CM	6	Marco Verratti		(substituted off) 58'
RF	14	Federico Chiesa
CF	20	Federico Bernardeschi		(substituted off) 46'
LF	10	Lorenzo Insigne		(substituted off) 58'
Substitutions:
DF	3	Giorgio Chiellini		(substituted on) 46'
FW	17	Moise Kean		(substituted on) 58'
MF	5	Manuel Locatelli	(yellow card) 82'	(substituted on) 58'
MF	7	Lorenzo Pellegrini		(substituted on) 64'
DF	4	Davide Calabria		(substituted on) 72'
Manager:
Roberto Mancini

GK	23	Unai Simón
RB	2	César Azpilicueta	(yellow card) 45'
CB	19	Aymeric Laporte
CB	3	Pau Torres
LB	17	Marcos Alonso
CM	8	Koke		(substituted off) 75'
CM	5	Sergio Busquets (c)
CM	9	Gavi		(substituted off) 84'
RF	22	Pablo Sarabia	(yellow card) 65'	(substituted off) 75'
CF	11	Ferran Torres		(substituted off) 49'
LF	21	Mikel Oyarzabal	(yellow card) 89'
Substitutions:
FW	7	Yeremy Pino	(yellow card) 71'	(substituted on) 49'
MF	20	Mikel Merino		(substituted on) 75'
MF	6	Bryan Gil		(substituted on) 75'
MF	10	Sergi Roberto		(substituted on) 84'
Manager:
Luis Enrique

Man of the Match:
Ferran Torres (Spain)

Assistant referees:
Igor Demeshko (Russia)
Maksim Gavrilin (Russia)
Fourth official:
Sergey Ivanov (Russia)
Video assistant referee:
Pol van Boekel (Netherlands)
Assistant video assistant referee:
Christian Dingert (Germany)

=== Belgium vs France ===
7 October 2021
20:45

Belgium	2–3	France
Carrasco 37'; Lukaku 40'	Report	Benzema 62'; Mbappé 69' (pen.); T. Hernandez 90'

Juventus Stadium, Turin
Attendance: 12,409
Referee: Daniel Siebert (Germany)

Belgium	France

GK	1	Thibaut Courtois
CB	2	Toby Alderweireld
CB	3	Jason Denayer
CB	5	Jan Vertonghen	(yellow card) 67'
RM	21	Timothy Castagne		(substituted off) 90+2'
CM	6	Axel Witsel
CM	8	Youri Tielemans		(substituted off) 70'
LM	11	Yannick Carrasco
RF	7	Kevin De Bruyne
CF	9	Romelu Lukaku
LF	10	Eden Hazard (c)		(substituted off) 74'
Substitutions:
MF	17	Hans Vanaken		(substituted on) 70'
FW	20	Leandro Trossard		(substituted on) 74'
FW	23	Michy Batshuayi		(substituted on) 90+2'
Manager:
(Spain) Roberto Martínez

GK	1	Hugo Lloris (c)
CB	5	Jules Koundé
CB	4	Raphaël Varane
CB	21	Lucas Hernandez
RM	2	Benjamin Pavard	(substituted off) 90+2'
CM	6	Paul Pogba
CM	14	Adrien Rabiot	(substituted off) 75'
LM	22	Théo Hernandez
AM	7	Antoine Griezmann
CF	19	Karim Benzema	(substituted off) 90+7'
CF	10	Kylian Mbappé
Substitutions:
MF	8	Aurélien Tchouaméni	(substituted on) 75'
DF	12	Léo Dubois	(substituted on) 90+2'
MF	17	Jordan Veretout	(substituted on) 90+7'
Manager:
Didier Deschamps

Man of the Match:
Kylian Mbappé (France)

Assistant referees:
Jan Seidel (Germany)
Eduard Beitinger (Germany)
Fourth official:
Harm Osmers (Germany)
Video assistant referee:
Christian Dingert (Germany)
Assistant video assistant referee:
Pol van Boekel (Netherlands)

== Third place play-off ==
10 October 2021
15:00

Italy	2–1	Belgium
Barella 46'; Berardi 65' (pen.)	Report	De Ketelaere 86'

Juventus Stadium, Turin
Attendance: 16,724
Referee: Srđan Jovanović (Serbia)

Italy	Belgium

GK	21	Gianluigi Donnarumma (c)
RB	2	Giovanni Di Lorenzo	(yellow card) 30'
CB	15	Francesco Acerbi
CB	23	Alessandro Bastoni
LB	13	Emerson Palmieri	(yellow card) 82'
CM	18	Nicolò Barella		(substituted off) 70'
CM	5	Manuel Locatelli
CM	7	Lorenzo Pellegrini		(substituted off) 70'
RF	11	Domenico Berardi		(substituted off) 90+1'
CF	9	Giacomo Raspadori		(substituted off) 65'
LF	14	Federico Chiesa		(substituted off) 90+2'
Substitutions:
FW	17	Moise Kean		(substituted on) 65'
MF	16	Bryan Cristante		(substituted on) 70'
MF	8	Jorginho		(substituted on) 70'
FW	10	Lorenzo Insigne		(substituted on) 90+1'
MF	20	Federico Bernardeschi		(substituted on) 90+2'
Manager:
Roberto Mancini

GK	1	Thibaut Courtois
CB	2	Toby Alderweireld	(yellow card) 63'
CB	3	Jason Denayer
CB	5	Jan Vertonghen (c)	(yellow card) 14'
RM	21	Timothy Castagne
CM	6	Axel Witsel	(yellow card) 56'
CM	8	Youri Tielemans		(substituted off) 59'
LM	22	Alexis Saelemaekers		(substituted off) 59'
RF	17	Hans Vanaken
CF	23	Michy Batshuayi
LF	11	Yannick Carrasco		(substituted off) 87'
Substitutions:
MF	7	Kevin De Bruyne		(substituted on) 59'
FW	18	Charles De Ketelaere		(substituted on) 59'
FW	20	Leandro Trossard		(substituted on) 87'
Manager:
(Spain) Roberto Martínez

Man of the Match:
Domenico Berardi (Italy)

Assistant referees:
Uroš Stojković (Serbia)
Milan Mihajlović (Serbia)
Fourth official:
Novak Simović (Serbia)
Video assistant referee:
Marco Fritz (Germany)
Assistant video assistant referees:
Chris Kavanagh (England)
Lee Betts (England)
Pol van Boekel (Netherlands)

== Final ==
10 October 2021
20:45

Spain	1–2	France
Oyarzabal 64'	Report	Benzema 66'; Mbappé 80'

San Siro, Milan
Attendance: 31,511
Referee: Anthony Taylor (England)

Spain	France

GK	23	Unai Simón
RB	2	César Azpilicueta
CB	19	Aymeric Laporte	(yellow card) 86'
CB	12	Eric García
LB	17	Marcos Alonso
CM	9	Gavi		(substituted off) 75'
CM	5	Sergio Busquets (c)
CM	16	Rodri		(substituted off) 84'
RF	11	Ferran Torres		(substituted off) 84'
CF	22	Pablo Sarabia		(substituted off) 61'
LF	21	Mikel Oyarzabal
Substitutions:
FW	7	Yeremy Pino		(substituted on) 61'
MF	8	Koke		(substituted on) 75'
MF	20	Mikel Merino		(substituted on) 84'
MF	18	Pablo Fornals		(substituted on) 84'
Manager:
Luis Enrique

GK	1	Hugo Lloris (c)
CB	5	Jules Koundé	(yellow card) 55'
CB	4	Raphaël Varane		(substituted off) 43'
CB	3	Presnel Kimpembe
RWB	2	Benjamin Pavard		(substituted off) 79'
LWB	22	Théo Hernandez
CM	6	Paul Pogba	(yellow card) 46'
CM	8	Aurélien Tchouaméni
AM	7	Antoine Griezmann		(substituted off) 90+2'
CF	19	Karim Benzema
CF	10	Kylian Mbappé	(yellow card) 90'
Substitutions:
DF	15	Dayot Upamecano		(substituted on) 43'
DF	12	Léo Dubois		(substituted on) 79'
MF	17	Jordan Veretout		(substituted on) 90+2'
Manager:
Didier Deschamps

Man of the Match:
Karim Benzema (France)

Assistant referees:
Gary Beswick (England)
Adam Nunn (England)
Fourth official:
Craig Pawson (England)
Reserve assistant referee:
Stuart Burt (England)
Video assistant referee:
Stuart Attwell (England)
Assistant video assistant referees:
Chris Kavanagh (England)
Lee Betts (England)
Pol van Boekel (Netherlands)

== Statistics ==
=== Goalscorers ===
There were 14 goals scored in 4 matches, for an average of 3.5 goals per match.

2 goals

- (France national football team) Karim Benzema
- (France national football team) Kylian Mbappé
- (Spain national football team) Ferran Torres

1 goal

- (Belgium national football team) Yannick Carrasco
- (Belgium national football team) Charles De Ketelaere
- (Belgium national football team) Romelu Lukaku
- (France national football team) Theo Hernandez
- (Italy national football team) Nicolò Barella
- (Italy national football team) Domenico Berardi
- (Italy national football team) Lorenzo Pellegrini
- (Spain national football team) Mikel Oyarzabal

=== Assists ===
2 assists

- (Belgium) Kevin De Bruyne
- (France) Kylian Mbappé
- (Spain) Mikel Oyarzabal

1 assist

- (Italy) Federico Chiesa

Source: UEFA

=== Awards ===
Player of the Tournament

The Hisense Player of the Finals award was given to Sergio Busquets, who was chosen by UEFA's technical observers.

- (Spain) Sergio Busquets

Top Scorer

The "Alipay Top Scorer Trophy", given to the top scorer in the Nations League Finals, was awarded to Kylian Mbappé, who finished with two goals and two assists in the Nations League Finals. The ranking was determined using the following criteria: 1) goals in Nations League Finals, 2) assists in Nations League Finals, 3) fewest minutes played in Nations League Finals, 4) goals in league phase.

Top scorer rankings
Rank	Player	Goals	Assists	Minutes
1st place, gold medalist(s)	(France) Kylian Mbappé	2	2	180
2nd place, silver medalist(s)	(France) Karim Benzema	2	0	179
3rd place, bronze medalist(s)	(Spain) Ferran Torres	2	0	133

Goal of the Tournament

The Gazprom Goal of the Tournament was decided by online voting. A total four goals were in the shortlist, chosen by UEFA's technical observers: Karim Benzema (against Spain), Ferran Torres (second goal against Italy), Théo Hernandez (against Belgium) and Romelu Lukaku (against France). Benzema won the award for his goal in the final.

Rank	Goalscorer	Opponent	Score	Result	Round
1st place, gold medalist(s)	(France) Karim Benzema	Spain	1–1	2–1	Final
2nd place, silver medalist(s)	(Belgium) Romelu Lukaku	France	2–0	2–3	Semi-finals
3rd place, bronze medalist(s)	(Spain) Ferran Torres	Italy	2–0	2–1	Semi-finals
4	(France) Théo Hernandez	Belgium	3–2	3–2	Semi-finals

=== Discipline ===
A player was automatically suspended for the next match for receiving a red card, which could be extended for serious offences. Yellow card suspensions did not apply in the Nations League Finals.

The following suspensions were served during the tournament:

Player	Offence(s)	Suspension(s)
(Italy) Leonardo Bonucci	(yellow card) (yellow-red card) in semi-finals vs Spain (6 October 2021)	Third place play-off vs Belgium (10 October 2021)
