= Ferran Torres =

Spanish footballer (born 2000)

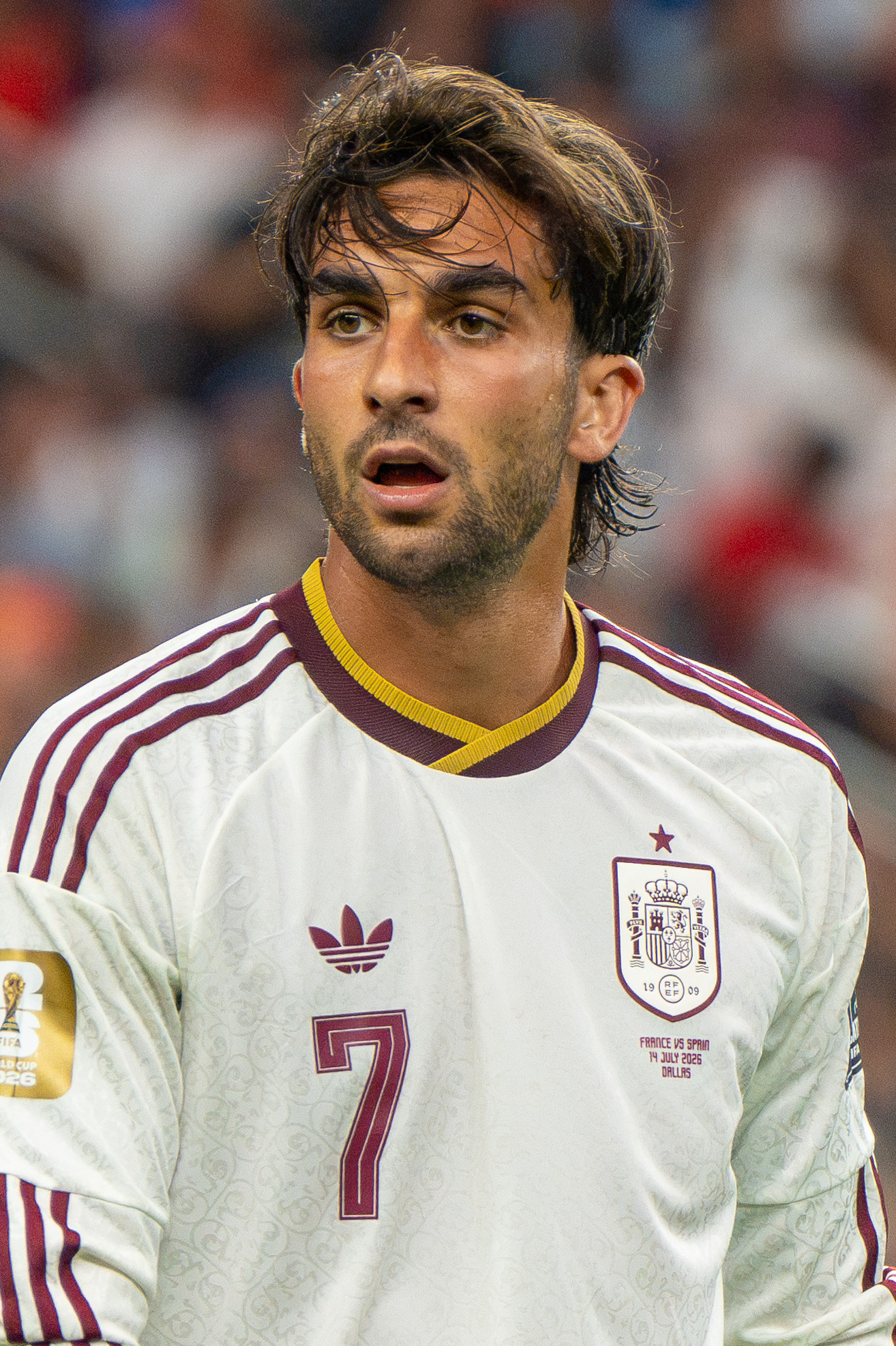
- Torres with Spain in 2026

Personal information
- Full name: Ferran Torres García
- Date of birth: 29 February 2000 (age 26)
- Place of birth: Foios, Spain
- Height: 1.82 m (6 ft 0 in)
- Position: Forward

Team information
- Current team: Paris Saint-Germain
- Number: 9

Youth career
- 2006–2017: Valencia

Senior career*
Years	Team	Apps	(Gls)
2016–2017	Valencia Mestalla	12	(1)
2017–2020	Valencia	71	(6)
2020–2022	Manchester City	28	(9)
2022–2026	Barcelona	140	(41)
2026–	Paris Saint-Germain	11	(5)

International career^{‡}
2016–2017	Spain U17	24	(2)
2018–2019	Spain U19	17	(10)
2019–2021	Spain U21	6	(0)
2020–	Spain	67	(25)
Medal record
Men's football
Representing Spain
FIFA World Cup
Winner	2026 Canada–Mexico–US
UEFA European Championship
Winner	2024 Germany
Bronze medal – third place	2020 Europe
UEFA Nations League
Runner-up	2021 Italy
UEFA European Under-19 Championship
Winner	2019 Armenia
FIFA U-17 World Cup
Runner-up	2017 India
UEFA European Under-17 Championship
Winner	2017 Croatia
- * Club domestic league appearances and goals as of 18:18, 21 November 2026 (UTC) ‡ National team caps and goals as of 21:10, 12 November 2026 (UTC)

Ferran Torres García (Note: Valencian pronunciation: [feˈran ˈtores]) (born 29 February 2000) is a Spanish professional footballer who plays as a forward for Ligue 1 club Paris Saint-Germain and the Spain national team.

Nicknamed “El Tiburón” (lit. 'The Shark') by former Barcelona manager Xavi, Torres began his career at Valencia, where he made his senior debut in 2017. He moved to Manchester City in 2020 and won the Premier League and the EFL Cup in the 2020–21 season. He departed for Barcelona in January 2022. After struggling in his first two seasons, Torres' form improved under coach Hansi Flick, and he won three La Liga titles, one Copa del Rey, and three Supercopa de España titles, including a domestic treble in the 2024–25 season. In 2026, Torres signed for Paris Saint-Germain for a fee of €50 million.

Torres made his debut for Spain in 2020. He helped them win UEFA Euro 2024, and guided Spain to victory at the 2026 FIFA World Cup, scoring the only goal in the final. Torres ranks as Spain's tenth-highest all-time top goalscorer.

== Club career ==
=== Valencia ===
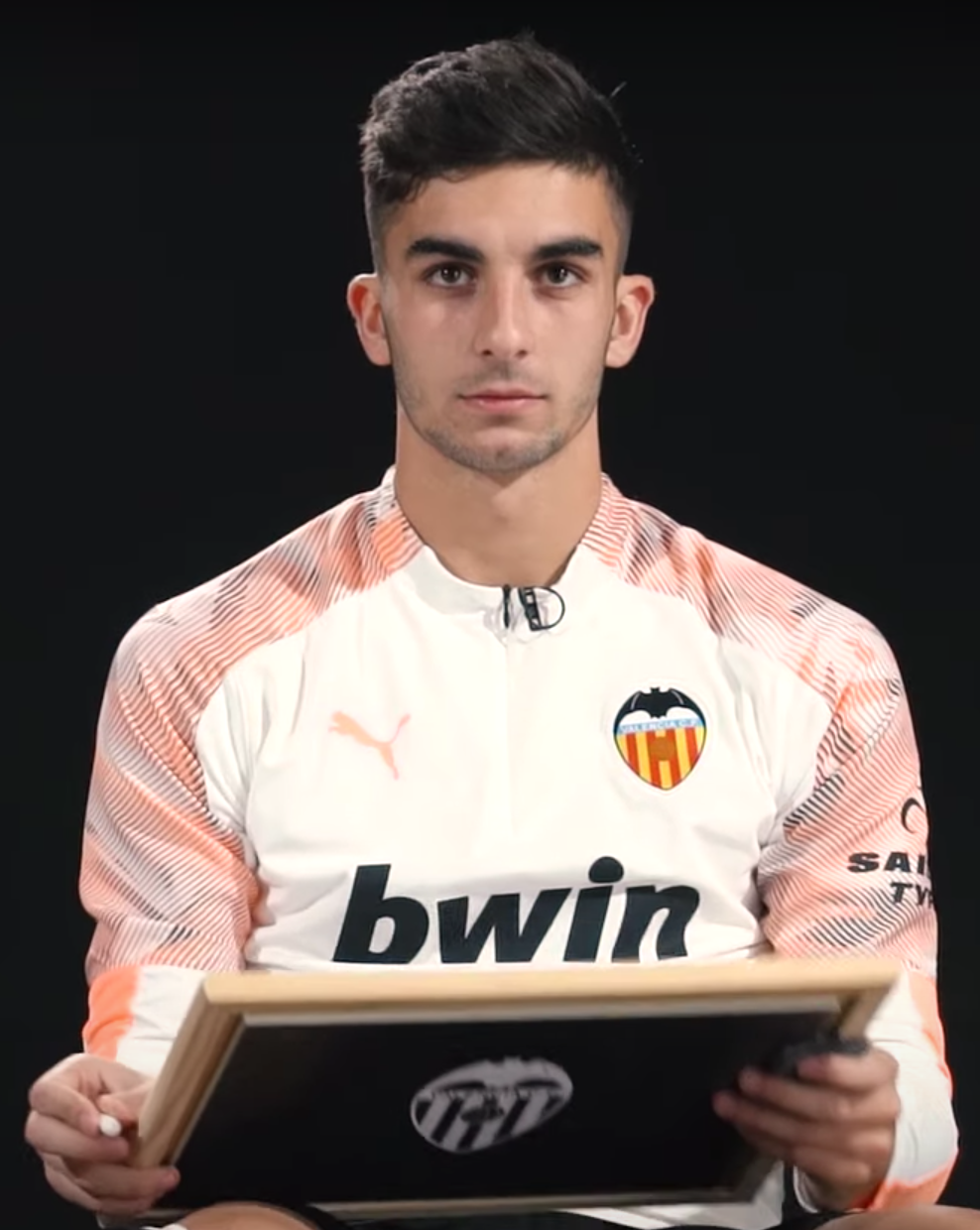
Torres with Valencia in 2020

Born in Foios, Valencia, Valencian Community, Spain. Torres joined Valencia CF's youth setup in 2006, aged six. On 15 October 2016, while still a junior, he made his senior debut with the reserve team by coming on as a substitute for Grego in a 2–0 Segunda División B home loss against Mallorca B.

Torres was promoted to the B-side ahead of the 2017–18 campaign, and scored his first senior goal on 26 August 2017 by netting his team's second in a 4–1 home win over Peralada-Girona B. On 5 October, after being strongly linked to Barcelona and Real Madrid, he renewed his contract, which increased his release clause to €25 million. He was also promoted to the first team on 1 January 2018.

Torres made his first team debut on 30 November 2017, replacing fellow youth graduate Nacho Gil in a 4–1 home routing of Real Zaragoza, for the season's Copa del Rey. He made his La Liga debut on 16 December, playing the last nine minutes in a 1–2 loss at Eibar, becoming the first player born in the 2000s to play in the league. Torres made his European and Champions League debut on 23 October 2018, starting in a 1–1 draw against Young Boys. He scored his first La Liga goal on 19 January 2019, ten minutes after coming on as a substitute in a 2–1 victory against Celta Vigo. He remained on the bench as Valencia defeated Barcelona 2–1 in the 2019 Copa del Rey Final at the Estadio Benito Villamarín in Seville, on 25 May.

On 5 November 2019, Torres scored his first Champions League goal, netting his team's last goal in a 4–1 home win against Lille, becoming Valencia's youngest goalscorer in the competition. On 23 November, Torres marked his 50th appearance in La Liga for Valencia with a 2–1 away defeat against Real Betis, becoming the youngest Los Ches player to play 50 league games at the age of 19 years and 254 days, breaking a 38-year-old record of Miguel Tendillo (19 years old and 351 days).

=== Manchester City ===
On 4 August 2020, English club Manchester City confirmed the signing of Torres on a five-year contract, until 2025, for a reported transfer fee of €23 million (£20.8 million). The club later revealed that Torres had inherited the shirt number 21 previously worn by club legend David Silva, a fellow Spanish player who also arrived from Valencia. Torres made his debut in City's first game of the season, coming on as a substitute in a 3–1 away win against Wolverhampton Wanderers in the Premier League. On 30 September, Torres scored his first goal for the club, in a 3–0 away win over Burnley in the EFL Cup.

On 21 October 2020, he made his Champions League debut with Manchester City, scoring a goal in a 3–1 win against Porto. Just a week later, Torres started and scored again in the Champions League in a 0–3 victory over Marseille, becoming the youngest Spanish player ever to score in three consecutive appearances in the competition, at 20 years and 241 days old. On 28 November, Torres scored his first league goal for City in a 5–0 home win over Burnley. On 14 May, Torres scored his first hat-trick for City in a 4–3 away league win over Newcastle United.

Having fallen out of favour during the 2021–22 season, mainly due to injury, Torres agreed a transfer to Barcelona for €55 million (plus conditional add-ons worth €10 million) in December 2021, to be completed the following month dependent on Barça selling players from their squad. He had scored 16 goals in 43 appearances.

=== Barcelona ===
On 28 December 2021, both Barcelona and Manchester City confirmed that Torres had completed a permanent move to Barcelona, signing a five-year contract until June 2027, with a buyout clause of €1bn. On 20 January 2022, Torres scored his first goal for Barcelona in a 3–2 loss against Athletic Bilbao at the end of extra time in the Copa del Rey round of 16. On 20 March 2022, he scored a goal and assisted Pierre-Emerick Aubameyang in his first El Clásico, helping Barcelona to a 4–0 away victory against the league leaders. During his first six months at the club, Torres made 25 appearances in all competitions, scoring seven goals. Torres struggled with his form at the start of the 2022–23 season, and was often benched in favour of Ousmane Dembélé and new signings Raphinha and Robert Lewandowski. On 19 February 2023, he put on a man-of-the-match performance in a 2–0 league win over Cádiz. The following day, Torres revealed in an interview that he had "fallen into a bottomless well", and had worked with a psychologist during his form slump.

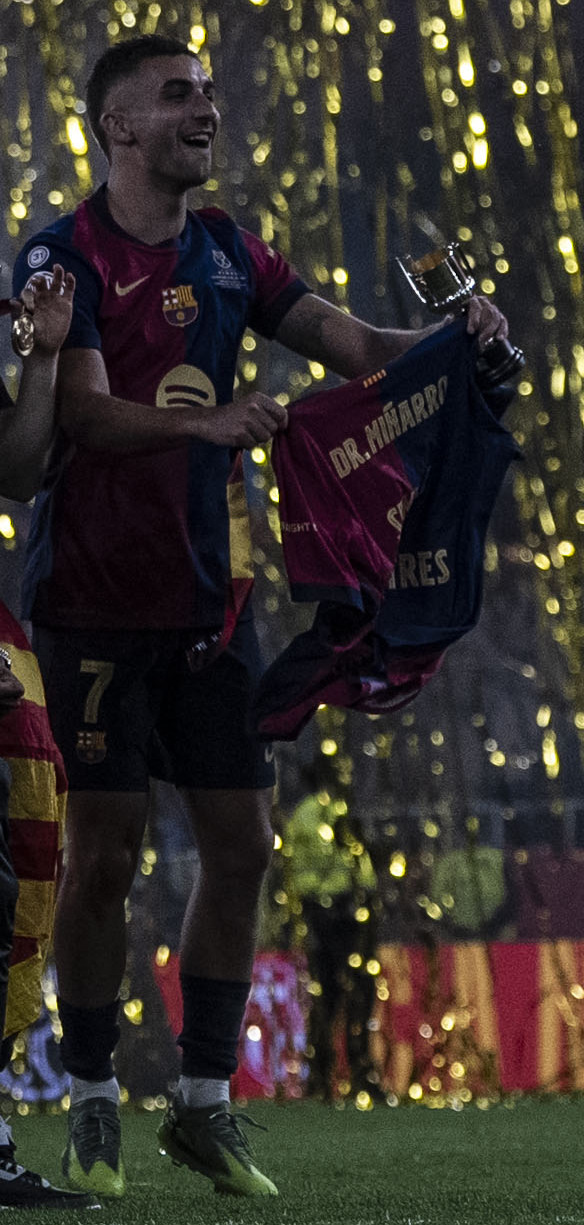
Torres celebration after winning the 2025 Copa del Rey final with Barcelona

On 21 January 2024, Torres scored his first hat-trick for Barcelona and provided an assist for João Félix on his 100th appearance for the club in a 4–2 away win against Real Betis. Later that year, on 11 December, in a thrilling Champions League match against Borussia Dortmund, Torres delivered a stunning performance by scoring a decisive brace, securing a 3–2 away victory for Barcelona. On 6 February 2025, he scored a hat-trick in the first half of a 5–0 away win over his former club Valencia in the Copa del Rey quarter-finals. Two months later, on 2 April, he scored the only goal in a 1–0 away win over Atlético Madrid, clinching a 5–4 aggregate victory and a spot in the Copa del Rey final. On 26 April 2025, he once again showed up to score a late equaliser against arch-rivals Real Madrid in the Copa del Rey final, forcing the game into extra time, where Barcelona secured the win thanks to Jules Koundé's winner. He was named MVP of the final and was the competition's top goal scorer.

On 11 May 2025, Torres secured a vital hat-trick of assists for Barcelona in a 4–3 win against Real Madrid. Four days later, the club said he had undergone surgery for appendicitis. Later that year, on 6 December, he netted a first-half hat-trick in a 5–3 victory away to Real Betis, bringing his tally to 11 goals in 15 matches in the 2025–26 season which marked his best scoring run ever in La Liga. He concluded the 2025–26 season by scoring 16 goals in La Liga, finishing as the club's joint-top scorer alongside Lamine Yamal.

=== Paris-Saint-Germain ===
On 15 August 2026, Torres joined Ligue 1 club Paris Saint-Germain on a five-year contract. The transfer fee was reportedly €50m. A week later, on 23 August, he made his debut as a substitute, scoring twice against Rennes — both goals assisted by his compatriot Fabián Ruiz — helping his new club secure a 2–2 draw and overturn a two-goal deficit. On 9 September, Torres started his first UEFA Champions League match for PSG against Slovan Bratislava on the first matchday of the league phase. He scored a hat-trick, contributing to his team's 6–1 victory. He thus became the second player in PSG's history to score five goals in his first four matches for the club, tying Zlatan Ibrahimović record. He was named Ligue 1's Player of the Month for September.

== International career ==
=== Youth ===
Torres was a member of the Spain squad that won the 2017 UEFA European Under-17 Championship final over England, and was also a member of the squad that reached the final of the 2017 FIFA U-17 World Cup later that same year, losing out to the same opponent. He was named in Spain's squad for the 2019 UEFA European Under-19 Championship in Armenia, scoring the winning penalty in the semi-final victory over France and both goals of the 2–0 final victory against reigning champions Portugal at the Vazgen Sargsyan Republican Stadium in Yerevan. He made his debut for the Spain U21 side on 6 September 2019, in a 1–0 away win over Kazakhstan in a European Championship qualifier.

=== Senior ===
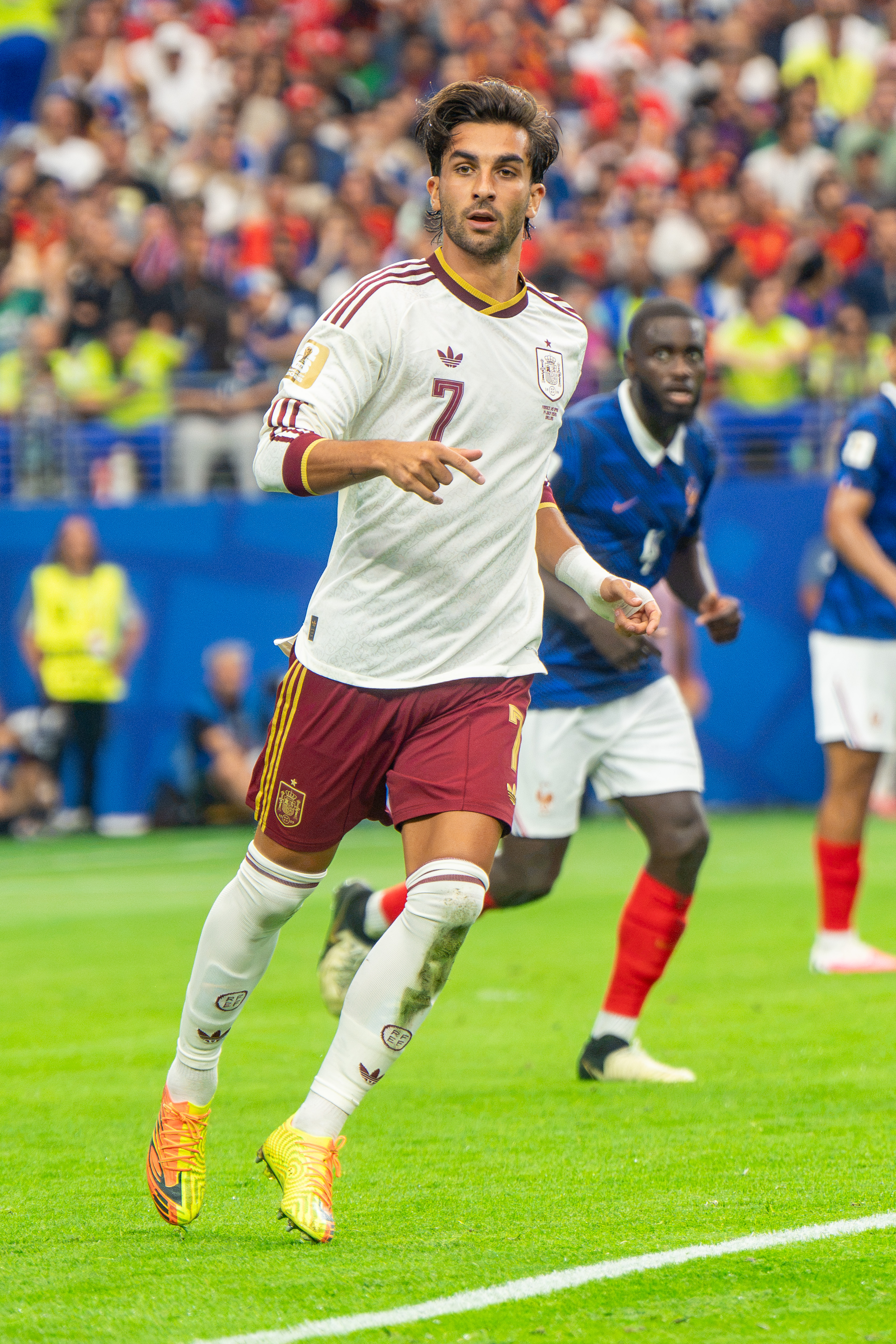
Torres playing for Spain at the 2026 FIFA World Cup

==== 2020–2022: Early senior career ====
Just 16 days after signing for Manchester City, Torres was called up to the senior Spain national team for the first time. He debuted against Germany in the UEFA Nations League on 3 September 2020, playing the full 90 minutes in a 1–1 away draw and setting up a pre-assist for Spain's last minute equaliser. Three days later, Torres scored his first senior international goal in a 4–0 win over Ukraine. On 17 November 2020, he scored his first international hat-trick in a 6–0 victory over Germany.

On 24 May 2021, Torres was included in Spain's 24-man squad for UEFA Euro 2020. He scored the third goal of the Euro 2020 final 16 in the 76th minute of the game against Croatia, resulting in a 5–3 victory on 28 June.

On 6 October, Torres scored both goals in Spain's 2–1 away victory over reigning European Champions Italy in the semi-finals of the 2020–21 UEFA Nations League. In the final four days later, Spain suffered a 2–1 defeat against France. With two goals, he was the joint–top scorer of the Nations League Finals, along with France's Karim Benzema and Kylian Mbappé, with the latter winning the Top Scorer Trophy due to having also provided two assists.

On 11 November 2022, Torres was selected in the Spanish squad for the 2022 FIFA World Cup in Qatar and scored his first ever World Cup brace against Costa Rica in a 7–0 victory.

==== 2022–Present: International titles and World Cup victory ====
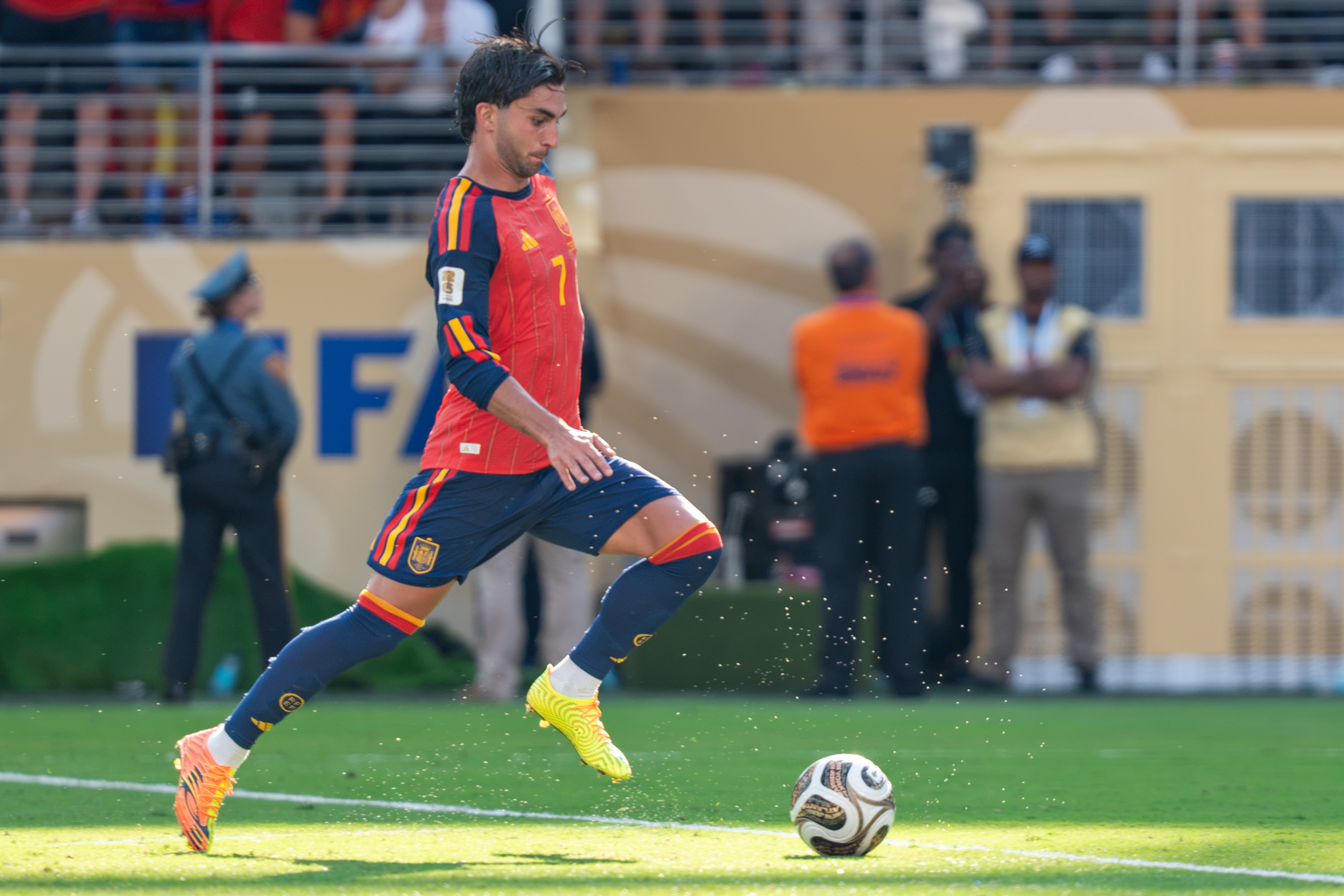
Torres with Spain against Argentina at the 2026 World Cup final

In May 2024, he was named in the 26-man squad for the UEFA Euro 2024. With Spain's victory against England in the final, Torres joined 12 other players in having won both youth and senior Euro titles, alongside his teammates Mikel Merino, Álvaro Morata, Nacho and Rodri.

On 25 May 2026, Torres was named in Spain’s squad for the 2026 FIFA World Cup. In their round of 16 match against Portugal, he provided the assist that secured them the victory in a 1–0 finish. On 19 July, Torres scored the match-winning goal for Spain in the final. Having come on as a substitute in the 62nd minute, he found the back of the net in the 106th minute during extra time, securing a 1–0 victory over defending champions Argentina. It was his first and only goal of the tournament. He was also named the final's Man of the Match.

== Style of play ==
In his youth Ferran Torres was regarded as a highly promising young winger, he had been described as a traditional wide midfielder due to his work rate and penchant for running to the touchline, although he is also capable of cutting inside towards the centre of the pitch. Torres is known in particular for his pace, creativity, technique, and close control at speed, which enable him to beat opponents in one-on-one situations and create overloads on the flanks. Despite being primarily a right winger, his height, athleticism, and heading ability also make him a strong aerial presence.

In 2018, Spanish football journalist Guillem Balagué described Torres as "a dribbler, fast on the wing, can play on either wing, and he has got ability and intelligence. He can also play inside if needed, so he is a modern winger." Valencia academy recruitment director José Giménez similarly praised his power, speed, two-footedness, aerial ability, and unpredictability in possession, highlighting his ability to beat defenders either inside or outside, as well as his crossing, finishing, and shooting. Due to his role, nationality, and playing style, Italian journalist Simone Lorini likened him to Joaquín.

Although naturally deployed on the right, Torres is a versatile forward capable of playing anywhere across the front line, including as a left winger, striker, or false nine.

== Personal life ==
Torres is a devout Catholic. "I have a cross and an image of the Virgin," he said in a video shared by the Spanish national football team. "In the end, I think it's something that gives me a lot of support. It gives me great strength in my faith, and for me it's something very important."

== Career statistics ==
=== Club ===
As of match played 21 November 2026

Appearances and goals by club, season and competition
Club	Season	League			National cup (Note: Includes Copa del Rey, FA Cup)		League cup (Note: Includes EFL Cup)		Europe		Other		Total	
Club	Season	Division	Apps	Goals	Apps	Goals	Apps	Goals	Apps	Goals	Apps	Goals	Apps	Goals
Valencia Mestalla	2016–17	Segunda División B	2	0	—		—		—		—		2	0
Valencia Mestalla	2017–18	Segunda División B	10	1	—		—		—		—		10	1
Valencia Mestalla	Total		12	1	—		—		—		—		12	1
Valencia	2017–18	La Liga	13	0	3	0	—		—		—		16	0
Valencia	2018–19	La Liga	24	2	6	1	—		7 (Note: Three appearances in UEFA Champions League, four appearances in UEFA Europa League)	0	—		37	3
Valencia	2019–20	La Liga	34	4	3	0	—		6 (Note: Appearance(s) in UEFA Champions League)	2	1 (Note: Appearance(s) in Supercopa de España)	0	44	6
Valencia	Total		71	6	12	1	—		13	2	1	0	97	9
Manchester City	2020–21	Premier League	24	7	3	1	3	1	6	4	—		36	13
Manchester City	2021–22	Premier League	4	2	—		1	1	1	0	1 (Note: Appearance in FA Community Shield)	0	7	3
Manchester City	Total		28	9	3	1	4	2	7	4	1	0	43	16
Barcelona	2021–22	La Liga	18	4	1	1	—		6 (Note: Appearances in UEFA Europa League)	2	1	0	26	7
Barcelona	2022–23	La Liga	33	4	4	0	—		7 (Note: Five appearances and three goals in UEFA Champions League, two appearances in UEFA Europa League)	3	1	0	45	7
Barcelona	2023–24	La Liga	29	7	3	1	—		8	3	2	0	42	11
Barcelona	2024–25	La Liga	27	10	5	6	—		11	3	2	0	45	19
Barcelona	2025–26	La Liga	33	16	4	1	—		10	3	2	1	49	21
Barcelona	Total		140	41	17	9	—		42	14	8	1	207	65
Paris Saint-Germain	2026–27	Ligue 1	11	5	0	0	—		4	3	0	0	15	8
Career total			262	62	32	11	4	2	66	23	10	1	374	99

=== International ===
As of match played 12 November 2026

Appearances and goals by national team and year
National team	Year	Apps	Goals
Spain	2020	7	4
Spain	2021	15	8
Spain	2022	13	3
Spain	2023	5	3
Spain	2024	8	3
Spain	2025	5	2
Spain	2026	14	2
Total		67	25

As of match played 12 November 2026
Spain score listed first, score column indicates score after each Torres goal.

List of international goals scored by Ferran Torres
No.	Date	Venue	Cap	Opponent	Score	Result	Competition	Ref.
1	6 September 2020	Alfredo Di Stéfano Stadium, Madrid, Spain	2	Ukraine	4–0	4–0	2020–21 UEFA Nations League A	
2	17 November 2020	La Cartuja, Seville, Spain	7	Germany	2–0	6–0	2020–21 UEFA Nations League A	
3	17 November 2020	La Cartuja, Seville, Spain	7	Germany	4–0	6–0	2020–21 UEFA Nations League A	
4	17 November 2020	La Cartuja, Seville, Spain	7	Germany	5–0	6–0	2020–21 UEFA Nations League A	
5	28 March 2021	Boris Paichadze Dinamo Arena, Tbilisi, Georgia	9	Georgia	1–1	2–1	2022 FIFA World Cup qualification	
6	31 March 2021	La Cartuja, Seville, Spain	10	Kosovo	2–0	3–1	2022 FIFA World Cup qualification	
7	23 June 2021	La Cartuja, Seville, Spain	14	Slovakia	4–0	5–0	UEFA Euro 2020	
8	28 June 2021	Parken Stadium, Copenhagen, Denmark	15	Croatia	3–1	5–3 (a.e.t.)	UEFA Euro 2020	
9	5 September 2021	Nuevo Vivero, Badajoz, Spain	19	Georgia	3–0	4–0	2022 FIFA World Cup qualification	
10	8 September 2021	Fadil Vokrri Stadium, Pristina, Kosovo	20	Kosovo	2–0	2–0	2022 FIFA World Cup qualification	
11	6 October 2021	San Siro, Milan, Italy	21	Italy	1–0	2–1	2021 UEFA Nations League Finals	
12	6 October 2021	San Siro, Milan, Italy	21	Italy	2–0	2–1	2021 UEFA Nations League Finals	
13	26 March 2022	RCDE Stadium, Cornellà de Llobregat, Spain	23	Albania	1–0	2–1	Friendly	
14	23 November 2022	Al Thumama Stadium, Doha, Qatar	32	Costa Rica	3–0	7–0	2022 FIFA World Cup	
15	23 November 2022	Al Thumama Stadium, Doha, Qatar	32	Costa Rica	4–0	7–0	2022 FIFA World Cup	
16	12 September 2023	Nuevo Estadio de Los Cármenes, Granada, Spain	36	Cyprus	4–0	6–0	UEFA Euro 2024 qualifying	
17	12 September 2023	Nuevo Estadio de Los Cármenes, Granada, Spain	36	Cyprus	6–0	6–0	UEFA Euro 2024 qualifying	
18	19 November 2023	José Zorrilla Stadium, Valladolid, Spain	40	Georgia	2–1	3–1	UEFA Euro 2024 qualifying	
19	5 June 2024	Nuevo Vivero, Badajoz, Spain	41	Andorra	5–0	5–0	Friendly	
20	24 June 2024	Merkur Spiel-Arena, Düsseldorf, Germany	44	Albania	1–0	1–0	UEFA Euro 2024	
21	8 September 2024	Stade de Genève, Geneva, Switzerland	48	Switzerland	4–1	4–1	2024–25 UEFA Nations League A	
22	7 September 2025	Konya Metropolitan Municipality Stadium, Konya, Turkey	50	Turkey	4–0	6–0	2026 FIFA World Cup qualification	
23	15 November 2025	Boris Paichadze Dinamo Arena, Tbilisi, Georgia	52	Georgia	3–0	4–0	2026 FIFA World Cup qualification	
24	4 June 2026	Estadio Riazor, A Coruña, Spain	56	Iraq	1–0	1–1	Friendly	
25	19 July 2026	MetLife Stadium, East Rutherford, United States	65	Argentina	1–0	1–0 (a.e.t.)	2026 FIFA World Cup final	

== Honours ==
Valencia

- Copa del Rey: 2018–19

Manchester City

- Premier League: 2020–21
- EFL Cup: 2020–21
- UEFA Champions League runner-up: 2020–21

Barcelona

- La Liga: 2022–23, 2024–25, 2025–26
- Copa del Rey: 2024–25
- Supercopa de España: 2023, 2025, 2026

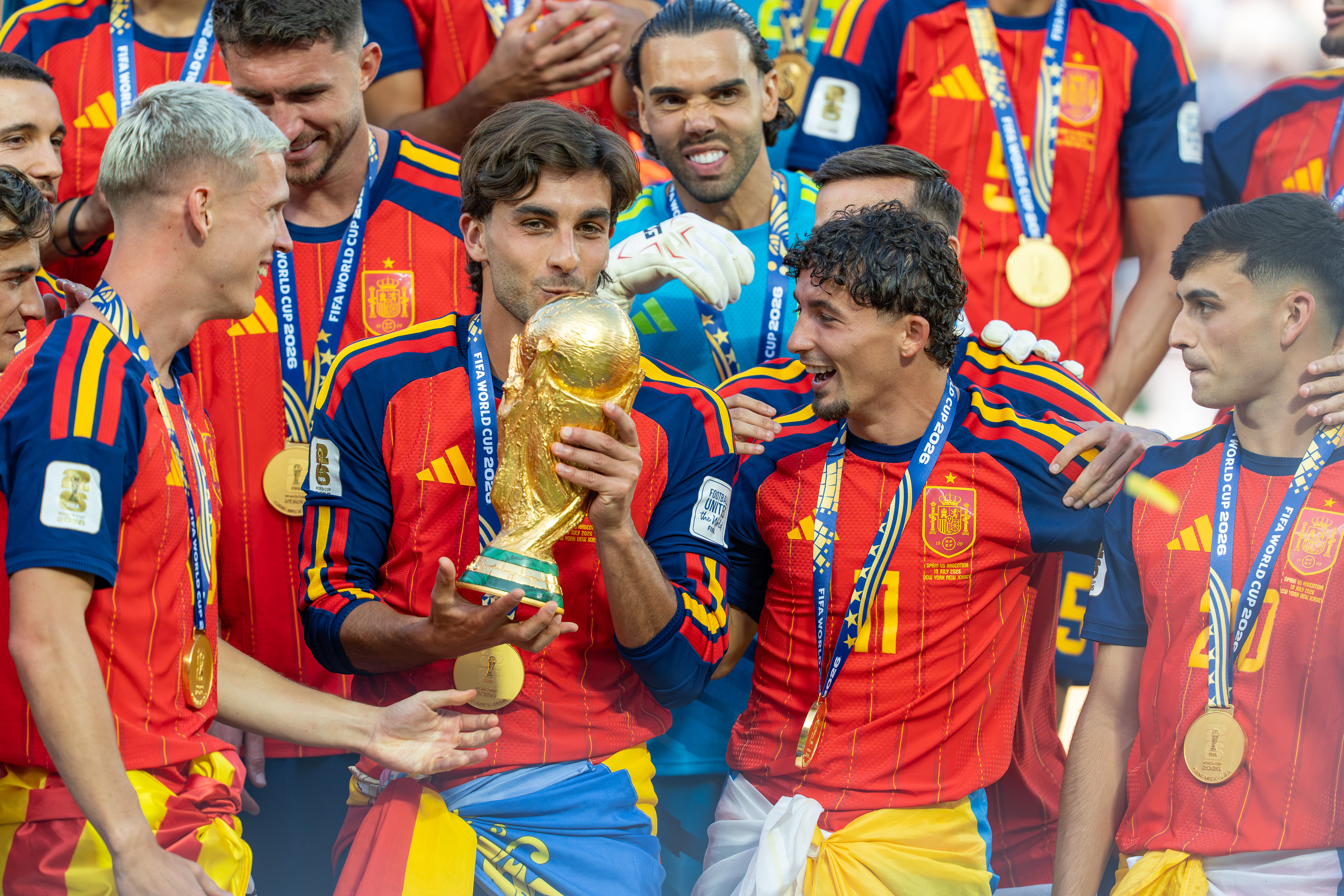
Torres holding the FIFA World Cup Trophy after Spain won the 2026 final

Spain U17

- UEFA European Under-17 Championship: 2017
- FIFA U-17 World Cup runner-up: 2017

Spain U19

- UEFA European Under-19 Championship: 2019

Spain

- FIFA World Cup: 2026
- UEFA European Championship: 2024
- UEFA Nations League runner-up: 2020–21

Individual

- UEFA European Under-19 Championship Team of the Tournament: 2019
- Manchester City Goal of the Season: 2020–21
- UEFA Nations League top scorer: 2020–21
- UEFA Nations League Finals Silver Boot: 2021
- La Liga Play of the Month: January 2024 (with João Félix)
- Copa del Rey top scorer: 2024–25
- Ligue 1 Player of the Month: September 2026
