= Théo Hernandez =

French footballer (born 1997)

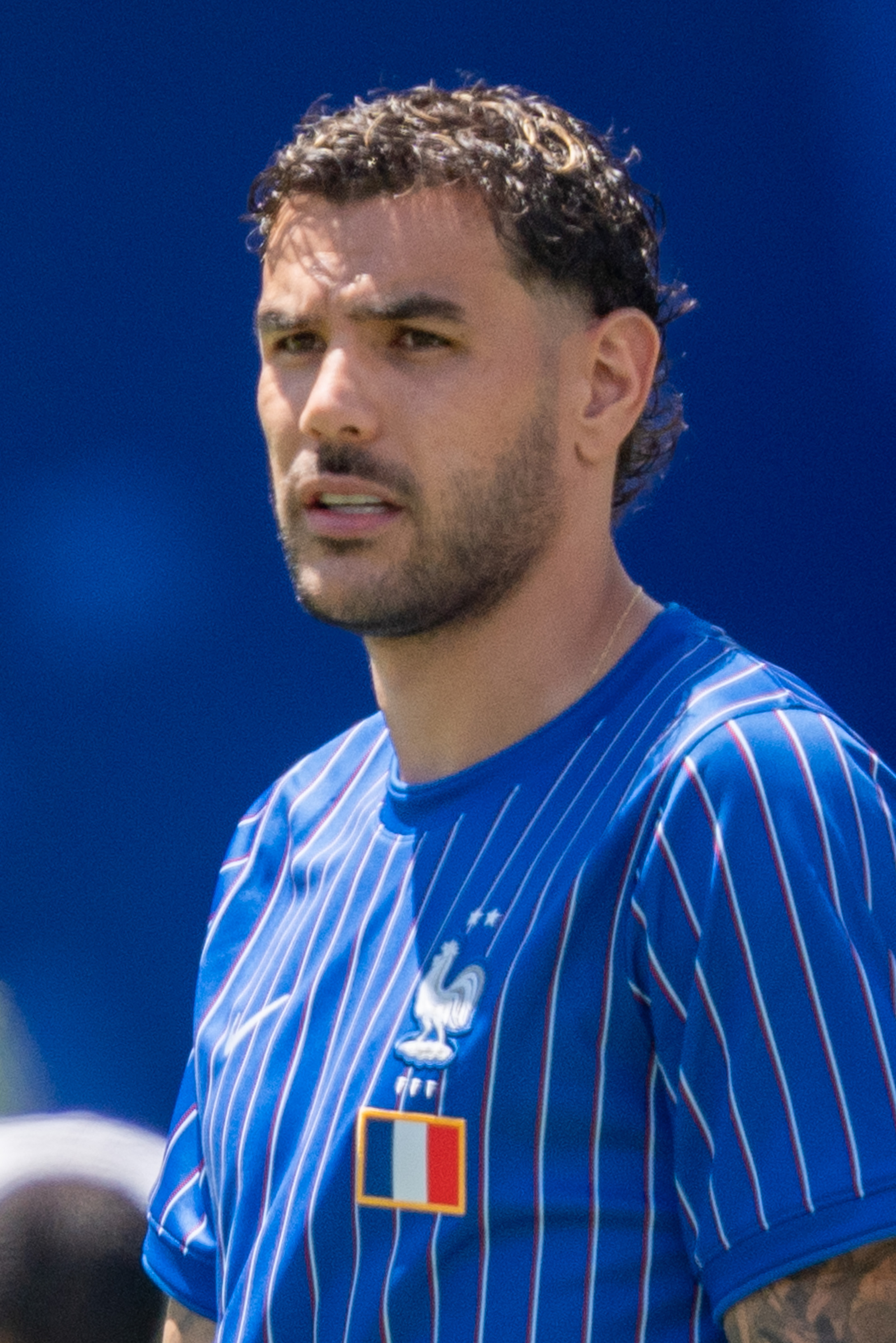
- Hernandez with France in 2026

Personal information
- Full name: Théo Bernard François Hernandez
- Date of birth: 6 October 1997 (age 29)
- Place of birth: Marseille, Bouches-du-Rhône, France
- Height: 1.84 m (6 ft 0 in)
- Position: Left-back

Team information
- Current team: Al Hilal
- Number: 19

Youth career
- 2006–2007: Rayo Majadahonda
- 2007–2015: Atlético Madrid

Senior career*
Years	Team	Apps	(Gls)
2015–2017	Atlético Madrid B	9	(0)
2016–2017	→ Alavés (loan)	32	(1)
2017–2019	Real Madrid	13	(0)
2018–2019	→ Real Sociedad (loan)	24	(1)
2019–2025	AC Milan	195	(31)
2025–	Al Hilal	38	(6)

International career^{‡}
2015	France U18	4	(0)
2015–2016	France U19	9	(0)
2016	France U20	3	(1)
2021–	France	49	(2)
Medal record
Men's football
Representing France
FIFA World Cup
Runner-up	2022 Qatar
UEFA Nations League
Winner	2021 Italy
Third place	2025 Germany
- * Club domestic league appearances and goals as of 21:18, 31 October 2026 (UTC) ‡ National team caps and goals as of 23:15, 18 July 2026 (UTC)

Théo Bernard François Hernandez (French pronunciation: [teo ɛʁnɑ̃dɛz, - ɛʁnandɛs]; born 6 October 1997) is a French professional footballer who plays primarily as a left-back for Saudi Pro League club Al Hilal and the France national team.

Born in France, Hernandez moved to Spain at the age of two and started his career with Atlético Madrid. After a loan spell at Alavés, he joined Real Madrid in 2017, winning the Champions League and Club World Cup in his first season. He was sent out on loan to Real Sociedad the next season, before joining AC Milan in 2019. He spent the next six seasons there, winning the Serie A once in 2022 and was named in the Serie A Team of the Year four times. In 2025, he moved to Al Hilal in Saudi Arabia.

Hernandez made his senior debut for France in 2021. Hernandez was part of the squad that reached the 2022 World Cup Final. He also participated at Euro 2024, the 2026 World Cup, and was part of the team that won the 2020–21 Nations League. Théo is the younger brother of fellow professional footballer Lucas Hernandez, and the son of Jean-François Hernandez, a retired footballer.

== Club career ==
=== Atlético Madrid ===
Born in Marseille, Bouches-du-Rhône, Hernandez moved to Spain at the age of two. He then joined Atlético Madrid's academy in 2007, aged nine. After progressing through the youth categories, he was promoted to the reserves in Tercera División in summer 2015.

On 3 February 2016, Hernandez renewed his contract. Two days later, he was called up to the first team for a La Liga match against Eibar due to injuries, but remained an unused substitute in the 3–1 home win.

=== Alavés ===
On 4 August 2016, Hernandez extended his contract until 2021, being immediately loaned to fellow league club Alavés for one year. He made his professional debut late in the month, starting in a 0–0 home draw with Sporting de Gijón.

On 16 October 2016, Hernandez was given a straight red card in a 1–1 home draw to Málaga after a hard tackle on Ignacio Camacho. He scored his first professional goal the following 7 May, netting the game's only goal in a home victory over Athletic Bilbao. A regular starter during the Basque team's run in the Copa del Rey, Hernandez helped them reach the final for the first time in their 91-year history. During the decisive match on 27 May 2017, he scored the equaliser through a direct free kick in an eventual 1–3 loss against Barcelona.

=== Real Madrid ===
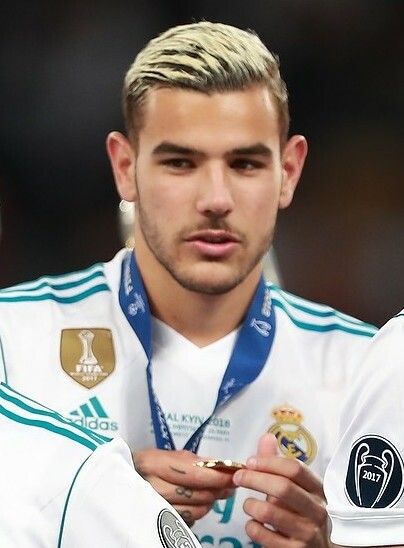
Hernandez celebrating after winning the 2017–18 UEFA Champions League with Real Madrid

On 5 July 2017, Hernandez signed a six-year deal with Real Madrid after they met his release clause of €24 million. He made his competitive debut on 16 August, replacing Marco Asensio in a 2–0 home win against Barcelona for that year's Supercopa de España.

Hernandez made three appearances during the 2017–18 edition of the UEFA Champions League, helping the club win its third consecutive and 13th overall title in the competition. On 10 August 2018, he was loaned to Real Sociedad.

=== AC Milan ===
On 7 July 2019, Hernandez joined Serie A club AC Milan in a deal worth maximum of €20 million. The transfer was approved and carried out by Paolo Maldini, who met with him informally in Ibiza to persuade him to join. Hernandez made his debut on 21 September, playing 18 minutes in the 2–0 defeat against Inter Milan in the Derby della Madonnina. He scored his first goal for the Rossoneri on 5 October, helping the visitors come from behind to win 2–1 at Genoa. During his first season with Milan he managed to score 7 goals in all competitions and had 3 assists.

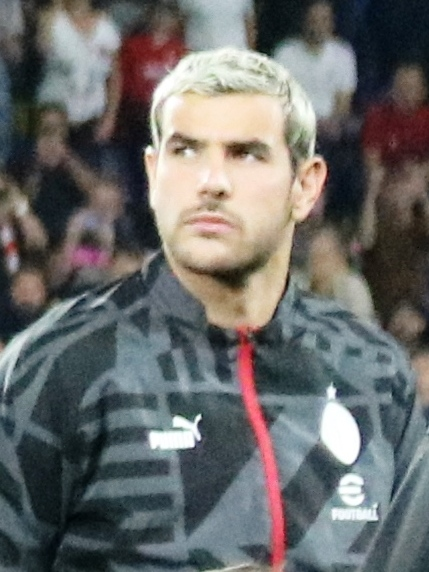
Hernandez with AC Milan in 2022

On 23 December 2020, Hernandez's 93rd-minute winning goal gave AC Milan a victory over Lazio to keep them top of Serie A. During the 2020–21 season, Hernandez was the only defender in the top five European leagues to have scored two braces. He was also the defender with the most successful dribbles in Serie A that season with 73. During his second season with the team, he managed to score 8 goals and assisted 7 in all competitions.

On 6 January 2022, Hernandez wore the captain's armband for the first time against Roma. Three days later, he scored a brace in a 3–0 win against Venezia, becoming first defender to score at least three braces in AC Milan's Serie A history. On 11 February, Hernandez renewed his contract with Milan until 2026. On 15 May 2022 against Atalanta, Hernandez ran for 95 metres before scoring the second goal of a 2–0 win. A week later, Milan were crowned with their first Serie A title in 11 years, Hernandez's contributions were 5 goals and 6 assists, the most for any defender in Serie A that season.

On 25 October 2023, Hernandez faced his older brother, Lucas, for the first time as an opponent playing competitive senior football in the UEFA Champions League group stage away game against Paris Saint-Germain, a 3–0 loss for Milan. The two faced each other once again two weeks later, with Milan prevailing 2–1 at home and Théo assisting the winning goal scored by Olivier Giroud. On 2 December 2023, amidst an injury crisis in Milan's central defense, Hernandez volunteered to play as a centre-back for the first time in his senior career and was highly praised for his performance by the Italian football media as Milan won 3–1 against Frosinone.

On 27 September 2024, Hernandez contributed to a 3–0 win against Lecce with a goal, which became his 29th in the Serie A. As a result, he equaled Paolo Maldini's goalscoaring record for AC Milan in the Serie A competitions and was praised on social media by the club and Maldini himself.

On 6 October 2024, his 27th birthday, Hernandez had a controversial game in Florence, which ended in a 2–1 loss for Milan to Fiorentina, followed by his post-game argument with a referee that culminated in a red card and a subsequent two-game suspension. During the first half, Hernandez caused a penalty (shot saved by Mike Maignan) and failed to score from the penalty spot himself, with his shot saved by David de Gea. In the second, he assisted the equalizing goal scored by Christian Pulisic with a curling cross from the left side and nearly caused another penalty kick for a risky tackle inside Milan's penalty box, with the referee ultimately deciding against it after a video review. On 14 January 2025, he scored his 30th Serie A goal for Milan in a 2–1 away victory over Como, becoming the club's highest-scoring defender, surpassing Paolo Maldini's previous record.

=== Al Hilal ===
On 10 July 2025, 27-year-old Hernandez joined Saudi Pro League club Al Hilal permanently, for an estimated €25 million fee.

In early January 2026, Italian reports suggested Juventus were in talks over a move to bring Hernandez back to Serie A from Al Hilal, including claims of a verbal agreement and that he "misses Italy".

== International career ==
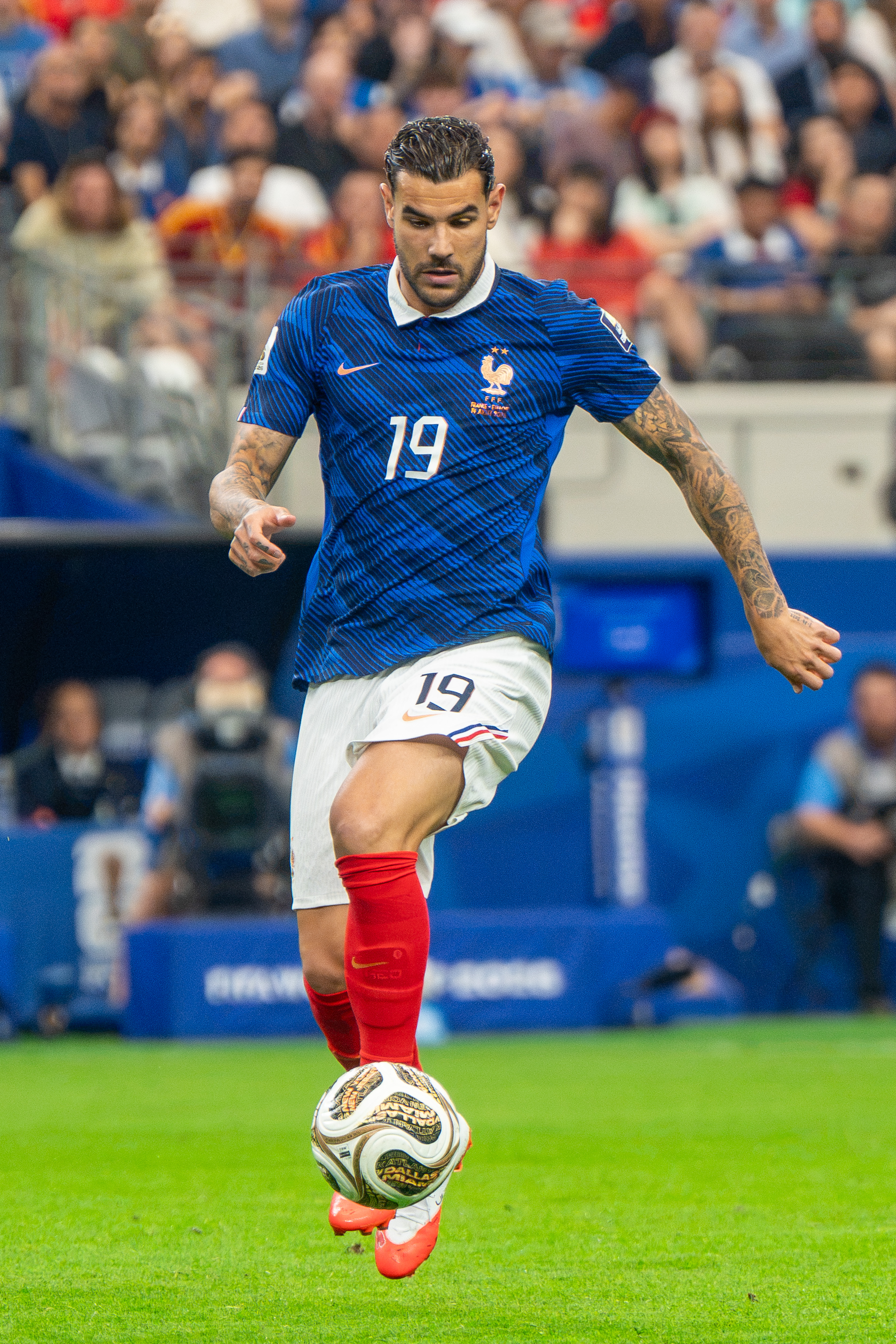
Hernandez at the 2026 FIFA World Cup

Hernandez played for France at under–18, under–19, and under–20 levels. In October 2017, due to a lack of call ups to the France under–21 team, Hernandez suggested he might switch his allegiance to Spain, where he had lived since he was two.

On 26 April 2018, Hernandez received his first call to the France senior squad. He made his debut on 7 September 2021 in a World Cup qualifier against Finland, a 2–0 home victory. He started and played the whole game. In October 2021, ahead of the UEFA Nations League semi-finals against Belgium, Théo for the first time received a call-up to the national team from Didier Deschamps together with his brother Lucas; the two were later fielded in the 3–4–1–2 formation as a left centre-back and a left wing-back, respectively, making it the first time they played together in a senior competitive game. On 7 October, he scored a late-time winner in the 3–2 victory against the aforementioned opponent, sending his team to the final for the first time in history of the tournament.

In November 2022, Hernandez was named in France's final squad for the 2022 FIFA World Cup in Qatar. On 14 December, he scored a goal in a 2–0 win over Morocco in the semi-finals.

In June 2024, he was named in the squad for UEFA Euro 2024 in Germany. In their quarter-final match against Portugal on 5 July, he scored the winning penalty kick of the shoot-out to send his country into the next round.

On 14 May 2026, Hernandez was selected in the 26-man squad for the 2026 FIFA World Cup.

== Personal life ==
Hernandez's father, Jean-François, was also a footballer and is of Spanish descent. A centre-back from France, he too played for Atlético Madrid; his older brother Lucas, who plays for Paris Saint-Germain and France, was also developed at the club. In 2022, French newspaper L'Équipe found that Jean-François – who went missing in 2004 – was living in Thailand, and had allegedly been legally blocked by his ex-partner from seeing their children.

He has been dating Italian model Zoe Cristofoli since June 2020. On 8 April 2022, the couple's son was born.

== Career statistics ==
=== Club ===
As of match played 3 November 2026

Appearances and goals by club, season and competition
Club	Season	League			National cup (Note: Includes Copa del Rey, Coppa Italia, King's Cup)		Continental		Other		Total	
Club	Season	Division	Apps	Goals	Apps	Goals	Apps	Goals	Apps	Goals	Apps	Goals
Atlético Madrid B	2015–16	Tercera División	9	0	—		—		1 (Note: Appearance in Tercera División play-offs)	0	10	0
Alavés (loan)	2016–17	La Liga	32	1	6	1	—		—		38	2
Real Madrid	2017–18	La Liga	13	0	6	0	3 (Note: Appearances in UEFA Champions League)	0	1 (Note: Appearance in Supercopa de España)	0	23	0
Real Sociedad (loan)	2018–19	La Liga	24	1	4	0	—		—		28	1
AC Milan	2019–20	Serie A	33	6	3	1	—		—		36	7
AC Milan	2020–21	Serie A	33	7	2	0	10 (Note: Appearances in UEFA Europa League)	1	—		45	8
AC Milan	2021–22	Serie A	32	5	4	0	5	0	—		41	5
AC Milan	2022–23	Serie A	32	4	1	0	11	0	1 (Note: Appearance(s) in Supercoppa Italiana)	0	45	4
AC Milan	2023–24	Serie A	32	5	2	0	12 (Note: Six appearances in UEFA Champions League, six appearances in UEFA Europa League)	0	—		46	5
AC Milan	2024–25	Serie A	33	4	4	0	10	0	2	1	49	5
AC Milan	Total		195	31	16	1	48	1	3	1	262	34
Al Hilal	2025–26	Saudi Pro League	31	5	5	2	8 (Note: Appearances in AFC Champions League Elite)	2	—		44	9
Al Hilal	2026–27	Saudi Pro League	7	1	1	0	3	0	—		11	1
Al Hilal	Total		38	6	6	2	11	2	—		55	10
Career total			311	39	38	4	62	3	5	1	416	47

=== International ===
As of match played 18 July 2026

Appearances and goals by national team and year
National team	Year	Apps	Goals
France	2021	4	1
France	2022	9	1
France	2023	10	0
France	2024	13	0
France	2025	5	0
France	2026	8	0
Total		49	2

As of match played 18 July 2026
Scores and results list France's goal tally first, score column indicates score after each Hernandez goal

List of international goals scored by Théo Hernandez
No.	Date	Venue	Cap	Opponent	Score	Result	Competition	Ref.
1	7 October 2021	Juventus Stadium, Turin, Italy	2	Belgium	3–2	3–2	2021 UEFA Nations League Finals	
2	14 December 2022	Al Bayt Stadium, Al Khor, Qatar	12	Morocco	1–0	2–0	2022 FIFA World Cup	

== Honours ==
Alavés

- Copa del Rey runner-up: 2016–17

Real Madrid

- Supercopa de España: 2017
- UEFA Champions League: 2017–18
- UEFA Super Cup: 2017
- FIFA Club World Cup: 2017

AC Milan

- Serie A: 2021–22
- Supercoppa Italiana: 2024–25

Al Hilal

- King's Cup: 2025–26

France

- UEFA Nations League: 2020–21; third place: 2024–25
- FIFA World Cup runner-up: 2022

Individual

- AC Milan Player of the Season: 2019–20
- Best Rossoneri Goal of the Season: 2022–23
- Serie A Team of the Year: 2019–20, 2020–21, 2021–22, 2022–23
- Serie A Goal of the Month: May 2022, May 2023
- Serie A Goal of the Season: 2021–22
- ESM Team of the Season: 2022–23
- Saudi Pro League Team of the Season: 2025–26

== See also ==
- List of European association football families
