= History of Arsenal F.C. =

The history of Arsenal Football Club spans the period from 1886 to the present day. For detail on individual periods of the club's history, see one of the following articles:

- History of Arsenal F.C. (1886–1966)
- History of Arsenal F.C. (1966–present)

For a season-by-season account of Arsenal's history, see List of Arsenal F.C. seasons.

== See also ==
- Arsenal F.C. § History
