= Olivier Giroud =

French footballer (born 1986)

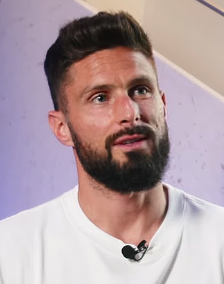
- Giroud in 2024

Personal information
- Full name: Olivier Jonathan Giroud
- Date of birth: 30 September 1986 (age 40)
- Place of birth: Chambéry, France
- Height: 1.93 m (6 ft 4 in)
- Position: Striker

Team information
- Current team: Lille
- Number: 9

Youth career
- 1992–1999: Froges
- 1999–2005: Grenoble

Senior career*
| Years | Team | Apps | (Gls) |
| 2005–2008 | Grenoble | 23 | (2) |
| 2007–2008 | → Istres (loan) | 33 | (14) |
| 2008–2010 | Tours | 44 | (24) |
| 2010–2012 | Montpellier | 73 | (33) |
| 2010 | → Tours (loan) | 17 | (6) |
| 2012–2018 | Arsenal | 180 | (73) |
| 2018–2021 | Chelsea | 75 | (17) |
| 2021–2024 | AC Milan | 97 | (39) |
| 2024–2025 | Los Angeles FC | 21 | (3) |
| 2025– | Lille | 40 | (10) |

International career
| 2011–2024 | France | 137 | (57) |
Medal record
Men's football
Representing France
FIFA World Cup
| Winner | 2018 Russia |
| Runner-up | 2022 Qatar |
UEFA Nations League
| Winner | 2021 Italy |
UEFA European Championship
| Runner-up | 2016 France |
- * Club domestic league appearances and goals as of 21:41, 21 November 2026 (UTC)

Olivier Jonathan Giroud (French pronunciation: [ɔlivje ʒɔnatɑ̃ ʒiʁu]; born 30 September 1986) is a French professional footballer who plays as a striker for Ligue 1 club Lille. Known for his aerial ability, hold up play and longevity, he is considered to be one of the most underrated players of his generation.

Giroud began his senior club career playing for hometown club Grenoble, before he signed with Tours in 2008, aged 21. He was named Ligue 2 Player of the Year in 2010 after finishing as the league's top goalscorer. He was subsequently the subject of a then-club record football transfer when he moved to Montpellier in a transfer worth €2 million, winning the club's first Ligue 1 title and finishing as league top goalscorer in 2012. He then joined Arsenal, where he won three FA Cups to help end Arsenal's nine-year trophy drought, and went on to score over 100 goals.

Giroud signed for crosstown rivals Chelsea in 2018 in a transfer worth £18 million (€20.7 million), winning the FA Cup, the UEFA Champions League, and the UEFA Europa League, finishing as top goalscorer in the latter in 2019. Giroud then signed for AC Milan in 2021, helping them win the 2021–22 Serie A, which ended the club's 11-year league title drought. After a one-year stint in the United States, playing for Major League Soccer side for Los Angeles FC, he made his return to France and Ligue 1, joining Lille.

Giroud made his senior international debut for the France national team in 2011 at age 25, and went on to earn 137 caps, including appearing in seven major tournaments. He is his country's second highest goalscorer, receiving the Bronze Boot as joint second-highest goalscorer as France finished runner-up at UEFA Euro 2016. He later won the 2020-21 UEFA Nations League, the 2018 FIFA World Cup and finished runner-up at the 2022 World Cup, where Giroud again received the Bronze Boot.

== Early life ==
Olivier Jonathan Giroud was born on 30 September 1986 in Chambéry in the Rhône-Alpes region, and was raised in the nearby village of Froges, close to Grenoble. He is of partial Italian descent through both his paternal and maternal grandmothers (Yvonne Avogadro and Antonia Gaiatto).

Independently of his professional career, Giroud, after obtaining his baccalaureate in economics and social sciences (ES), completed a second year of a degree in science and techniques of physical and sports activities (STAPS) at the Joseph Fourier University, in Grenoble.

Giroud began organised football playing for his hometown club, Olympique Club de Froges. He spent six years training at the club before joining professional club Grenoble at the age of 13.

== Club career ==
=== Grenoble ===
Giroud spent five years developing in Grenoble's youth academy before signing his first professional contract at the age of 21. He later admitted that signing his first contract was an important part in his development as a player, stating "It took me signing my first professional contract to become aware of my abilities. If you [a club] trusted me, it was because I must have had some qualities." Ahead of the 2005–06 season, he was promoted to the club's reserve team, which was playing in the Championnat de France Amateur 2, the fifth level of French football. Giroud quickly became an important player in the team scoring 15 goals in 15 matches. His performances over seven months with the reserve team resulted in the player being called up to the senior team in March 2006 by manager Thierry Goudet. Giroud made his professional debut on 27 March appearing as a late-match substitute in a 1–1 draw with Gueugnon in Ligue 2. He remained a part of the senior team for the rest of the campaign making five more substitute appearances.

Giroud was promoted to the senior team permanently for the 2006–07 season by new manager Payton Pouliquen and Nicola Malgeri and was assigned the number 22 shirt. After appearing as a substitute in the team's first league match of the campaign, he made his first professional start in a 2–1 defeat away to Niort playing the entire match. On 26 February 2007, Giroud scored his first professional goal netting the injury time winner against Le Havre. He described the goal as "a fantastic memory. I could not dream better for a first pro goal". A month later, Giroud made his third start of the campaign against Gueugnon. In the match, which ended 0–0, Giroud incurred his first professional red card. He finished the campaign with 18 total appearances and two goals as Grenoble finished in fifth place.

==== Loan to Istres ====
In an attempt to earn some playing time, Giroud spent the 2007–08 season on loan at Istres in the Championnat National, the third level of football in France. Under the tutelage of manager Frédéric Arpinon, he continued his development as a striker and, in his second match with the club, scored his first goal in a 2–1 win over Laval. Two weeks later, Giroud scored goals in back-to-back matches against Vannes and Créteil. He scored his first double of the season in a 2–0 win against Arles-Avignon. A fortnight later, Giroud converted two goals again, this time in a 3–2 win over Pau. After going through the months of November and December without scoring a league goal, Giroud returned to form in January scoring goals in a 3–2 defeat to Vannes and a 2–0 win over Beauvais. He finished the campaign by scoring goals in April league fixtures against Paris and Martigues, which brought his total goal tally with Istres to 14. Of the 14 goals, Giroud only scored four at the Stade Parsemain, Istres's home stadium.

After a successful loan stint, Giroud returned to Grenoble with hopes of receiving some significant playing time as the club was now playing in Ligue 1. However, club manager Mehmed Baždarević, who was hired while Giroud was on his loan stint at Istres, deemed the player surplus to requirements and, subsequently, listed him for transfer. According to reports, Baždarević had declared that Giroud "did not have the level to play among the elite". In 2011, Giroud reevaluated his departure from Grenoble stating "I am neither resentful nor vengeful. I am just disappointed with what happened to Grenoble when there was great potential".

=== Tours ===
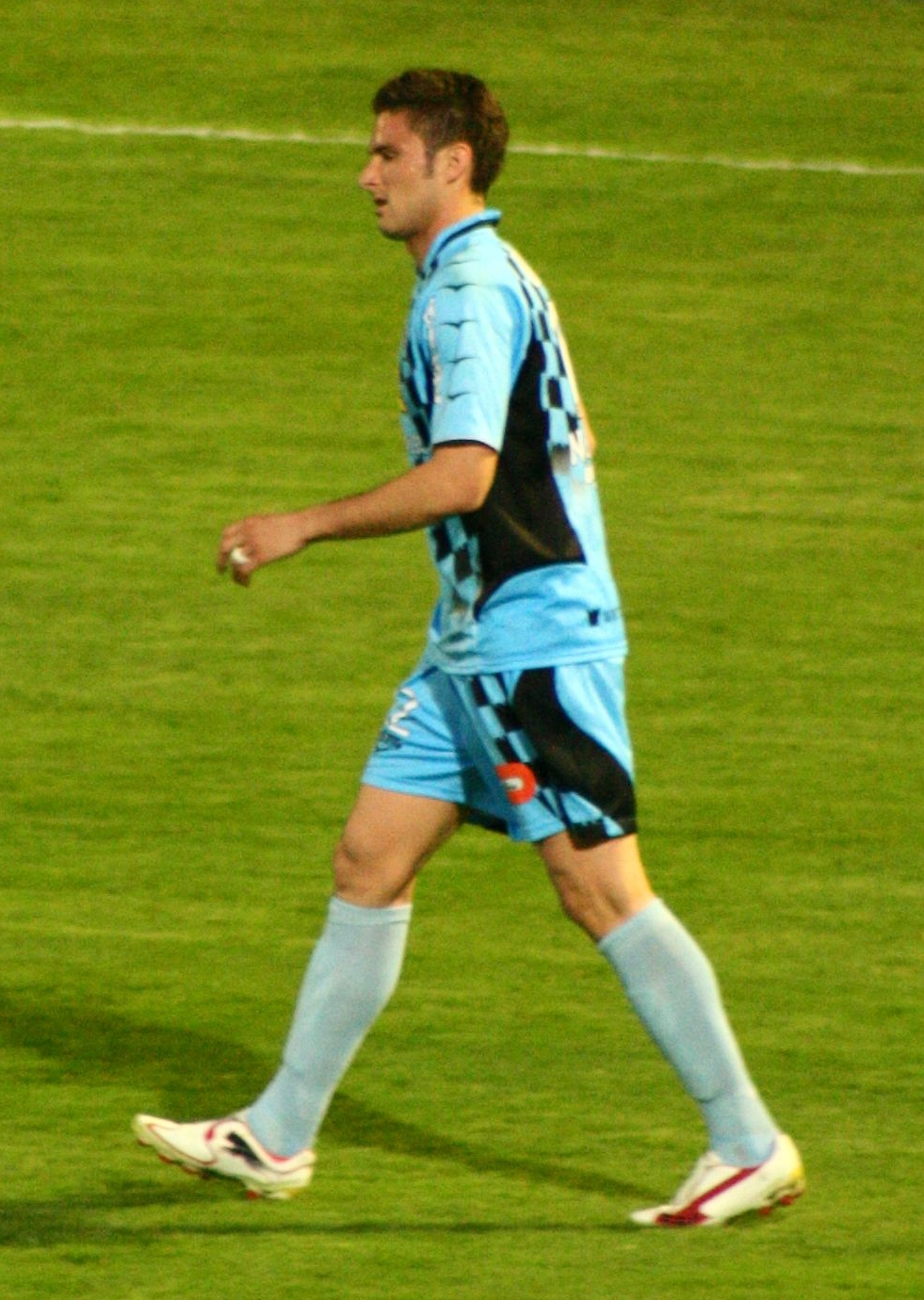
Giroud playing for Tours in 2010

On 28 May 2008, it was reported that Giroud had agreed to a three-year deal with Ligue 2 club Tours. The striker was lured to the club by sporting director Max Marty who had previously served as the chief executive officer of Grenoble, Giroud's former club. Giroud was also fond of Tours's manager Daniel Sanchez stating "It's always a plus to have a former striker as a coach. His advice to me really helped a lot. With him, I progressed in my positioning and also in front of goal". Giroud was given the number 12 shirt and, due to injury, made his club debut on 3 September 2008 in a 2–1 defeat to Boulogne in the Coupe de la Ligue. He made his league debut a week later playing the entire match in a 1–0 win over Nîmes. A month later, Giroud scored his first goal for the club converting the opener in a league match against Lens. In the second half, he scored another goal to cap a 3–1 win. Two weeks later, Giroud scored his third goal for the club in a victory over Ajaccio.

In the Coupe de France, Giroud scored five goals in two matches. In the eighth round of the competition, he scored the team's only goal in a 1–0 win over semi-professional club Pacy Vallée-d'Eure. In the ensuing round against Réunionais club Jeanne d'Arc, Giroud scored four goals in a 7–1 win. Tours would later be eliminated in the next round by Lorient. After his four-goal display against Jeanne d'Arc, Giroud followed up the performance by scoring goals in back-to-back league matches against Montpellier and Metz. After a double against Nîmes on 20 February 2009, the striker suffered an injury, which forced him to miss three league matches. After making two substitute appearances on his return, in his first start since the injury on 3 April against Angers, Giroud scored the team's opening goal in a 3–1 win. Giroud later re-aggravated the previous injury in training, which led to him missing the entire month of April as Tours were contesting a promotion battle with several clubs. Despite losing Giroud, the club went unbeaten in the four league matches he missed. On his return against Boulogne on 8 May, Giroud scored his final goal of the season in a victory. In Tours's final three league matches of the campaign, the club failed to achieve a win, which resulted in the club failing to earn promotion to Ligue 1. Giroud finished the season with 27 total appearances and 14 goals.

In the 2009–10 season, Giroud was promoted to the lead striker role following the departure of Tenema N'Diaye to Nantes. The promotion immediately paid off as Giroud scored two goals in the team's opening match of the season; a 2–1 win over Le Havre in the Coupe de la Ligue. On 18 August 2009, he scored his first league goal against the same opposition in another win. Following another league goal in a win over Guingamp, on 18 September, Giroud scored all four of Tours's goals in a 4–2 win over Arles-Avignon. It was his second career four-goal match at the professional level and his third overall having had one at amateur level while playing with the Grenoble reserve team. In the team's next 15 matches in all competitions, Giroud remained on form scoring ten goals. During that span, the striker scored in consecutive matches on three occasions. Giroud finished the fall campaign with 16 goals, 13 of which came in league play.

On 26 January 2010, it was reported that Ligue 1 club Montpellier had signed Giroud from Tours on a three-and-a-half-year deal. The transfer fee was priced at €2 million and it was also announced that Montpellier would loan Giroud back to Tours until the end of the 2009–10 season. The striker admitted the move to Montpellier would benefit him the most stating "I feel that here (Montpellier), the coach and staff will be able to help me make real progress. The environment is ideal, the training center is good, the group is healthy, and there's a beautiful stadium with an audience that responds to this". Following the transfer, Giroud went three weeks without scoring a goal before converting one on 19 February 2010 in a win over Arles-Avignon. Two weeks later, he scored the team's only goal in a 2–1 defeat to Nantes. On 19 March, Giroud scored two goals in a shutout win against Châteauroux. A week later, he scored in another shutout victory over Strasbourg. After the goal against Strasbourg, Giroud went seven matches without scoring before netting on the final matchday of the season against Nîmes. He finished the season with 42 appearances and 24 goals. Giroud scored 21 in the league and was named the league's top goalscorer. After the season, he was named the National Union of Professional Footballers (UNFP) Ligue 2 Player of the Year. Giroud was also named to the league's Team of the Year.

=== Montpellier ===
Giroud officially joined Montpellier on 1 July 2010. He simultaneously made his club and European debut on 29 July in the first leg of Montpellier's UEFA Europa League third qualifying round with Hungarian club Győri ETO. In the match, Giroud scored his first goal for the club in the first half. Montpellier won the match courtesy of Giroud's goal, but were defeated on aggregate after losing on penalties in the second leg. Giroud made his league debut in the team's first match of the campaign; a 1–0 win over Bordeaux. On 28 August, he scored his first league goal in a 1–0 away win against Valenciennes. On 25 September, Giroud scored two goals in a home victory over Arles-Avignon. The double brought his career goal tally to nine against the Bouches-du-Rhône-based club. A week later, he scored Montpellier's lone goal in a 3–1 loss to Lille. In November 2010, Giroud scored game-winning goals in consecutive weeks against Toulouse and Nice.

In the Coupe de la Ligue, Montpellier surprisingly reached the final of the competition. In the semi-finals against Paris Saint-Germain, Giroud played the entire match, which went into extra time. In the 117th minute, he scored the match-winning goal to send Montpellier to its first major final since the 1993–94 season when the club reached the final of the Coupe de France. In the 2011 Coupe de la Ligue Final, Montpellier faced Marseille and were defeated 1–0 courtesy of a goal by Taye Taiwo. Giroud played the entire match. Following his goal against Paris Saint-Germain, Giroud went scoreless for nearly two months before converting both club goals against the same opposition in a 2–2 draw at the Parc des Princes. Towards the end of the league season, Giroud scored goals against title contenders Marseille and Lyon. However, Montpellier lost both matches. After finishing the season as the club's top scorer, on 31 May 2011, Giroud signed a contract extension with Montpellier until 2014.

Giroud began the 2011–12 campaign on form scoring in the team's first two league matches of the season against Auxerre and the defending champions Lille. Montpellier won both matches. After scoring a double in a 2–2 draw with Brest, French newspaper Le Parisien affectionately dubbed him le buteur de charme (the charm striker). The nickname paid tribute to his goalscoring ability, as well as personality and looks and was, subsequently, used by several other media outlets in France to describe the player. In the team's next 18 matches in all competitions, Giroud lived up to the nickname by scoring 13 goals. The impressive output consisted of hat-tricks against Dijon and Sochaux, match-winning goals against Nancy, Lyon, and Nice, and a goal each in the Coupe de la Ligue and Coupe de France.

As a result of Giroud's performance and the team as a whole, Montpellier topped the league table in November 2011. In January 2012, Giroud was linked with a transfer to several clubs. Montpellier's owner Louis Nicollin responded to the rumours on French radio station RTL and surprised many by deeming one club "not big enough" for Giroud, while also declaring that the striker would cost "at least €50 or €60 million". At the start of the second half of the campaign, Giroud scored in back-to-back league matches against Lyon and Nice. Two weeks later against Ajaccio, he assisted on Montpellier's second goal and scored the team's final goal in a 3–0 win. On 24 March 2012, Giroud scored in the 1–0 win over Saint-Étienne. The victory placed Montpellier at the top of the table and the club remained there for the rest of the campaign capturing its first league title in club history after beating Auxerre 2–1 on the final day of the season. Giroud finished the season with a league-leading 21 goals and 9 assists. Despite being tied on goals with Paris Saint-Germain attacker Nenê, he was named the league's top scorer by the Ligue de Football Professionnel due to finishing with more goals in open play.

=== Arsenal ===
==== 2012–13: Debut season ====
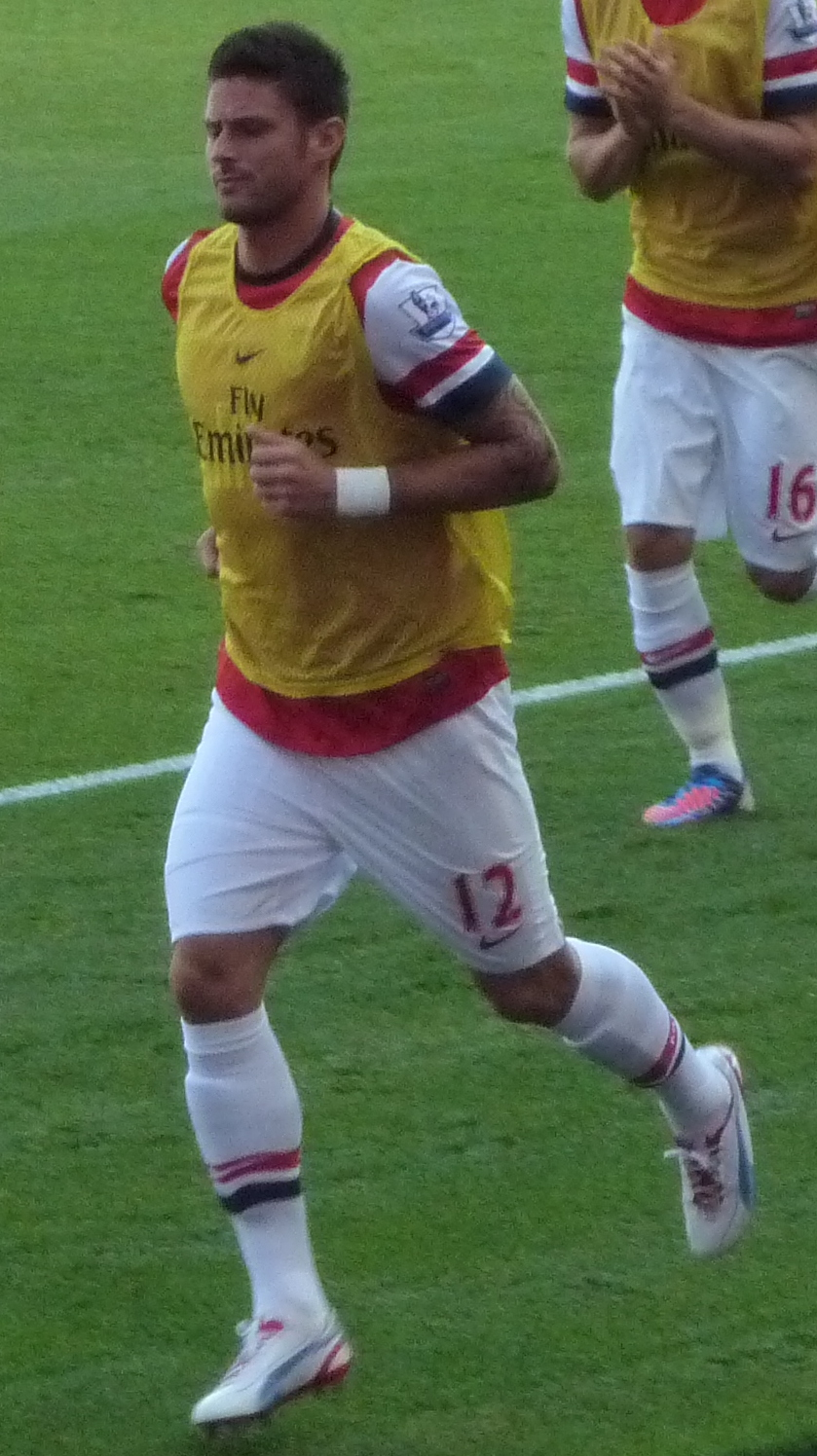
Giroud warming up for Arsenal in 2012

On 26 June 2012, Arsenal won the race to sign Giroud on a long-term contract for a fee believed to be around £9.6 million (€12.4 million). He was given the number 12 shirt. He made his debut on 18 August as a substitute for fellow debutant Lukas Podolski in a goalless home draw against Sunderland in the Premier League and scored his first goal for Arsenal on 26 September, in a 6–1 win against Coventry City in the League Cup. His first Premier League goal came on 6 October, with the equaliser in a 3–1 win against West Ham United, in which he also assisted a Theo Walcott goal. On 30 October, he helped Arsenal to a historic comeback in a League Cup tie against Reading, as Arsenal were 4–0 down before coming back to win the game 7–5 after extra-time, with Giroud scoring Arsenal's second goal. Giroud scored his first UEFA Champions League goal for Arsenal in a 2–2 draw at Schalke 04 on 6 November and four days later he scored twice in a 3–3 draw at home to Fulham. Giroud's form earned him a place in the Premier League team of the week.

On 17 November, Giroud scored the third goal in Arsenal's 5–2 derby win over Tottenham. Four days later, Giroud assisted both Jack Wilshere's and Lukas Podolski's goals in Arsenal's 2–0 victory over former club Montpellier, which allowed Arsenal to qualify for the knockout stages of the tournament. Arsenal fans began warming to Giroud as he started to pick up form after an initially shaky start; a run of goals in consecutive games led to a chant mimicking The Beatles' "Hey Jude" of 'Na na na, Na na naaaa, Na na naaaa, Giroud' echoing around the Emirates Stadium. On 29 December 2012, Giroud scored a brace and hit the crossbar after coming on as a substitute for Alex Oxlade-Chamberlain in the 80th minute, as Arsenal beat Newcastle United 7–3 at the Emirates Stadium.

On 23 January, Giroud scored a brace as Arsenal beat West Ham 5–1, and did the same in a Man of the Match performance against Brighton & Hove Albion in the fourth round of the FA Cup three days later. On 30 January, Giroud scored as Arsenal fought back to earn a 2–2 draw, from 2–0 down at home to Liverpool. Giroud scored a header from a Wilshere free kick, and provided an assist for Theo Walcott. For January, Giroud was awarded with the Arsenal Fan's Player of the Month Award. On 13 April 2013, Giroud played a big part of Arsenal's 3–1 win against Norwich City at home, winning a penalty that led to the equalizer in the 85th minute. He then sent Arsenal ahead himself two minutes later and set up for Lukas Podolski. This victory sent Arsenal to third in the table, climbing past London-rivals Chelsea and Tottenham. He received his first red card for Arsenal against Fulham, which meant he would miss three of Arsenal's last four games of the season. His appeal was rejected by the Football Association. Giroud finished the season with 17 goals and 11 assists in 47 appearances.

==== 2013–15: Ending the trophy drought ====
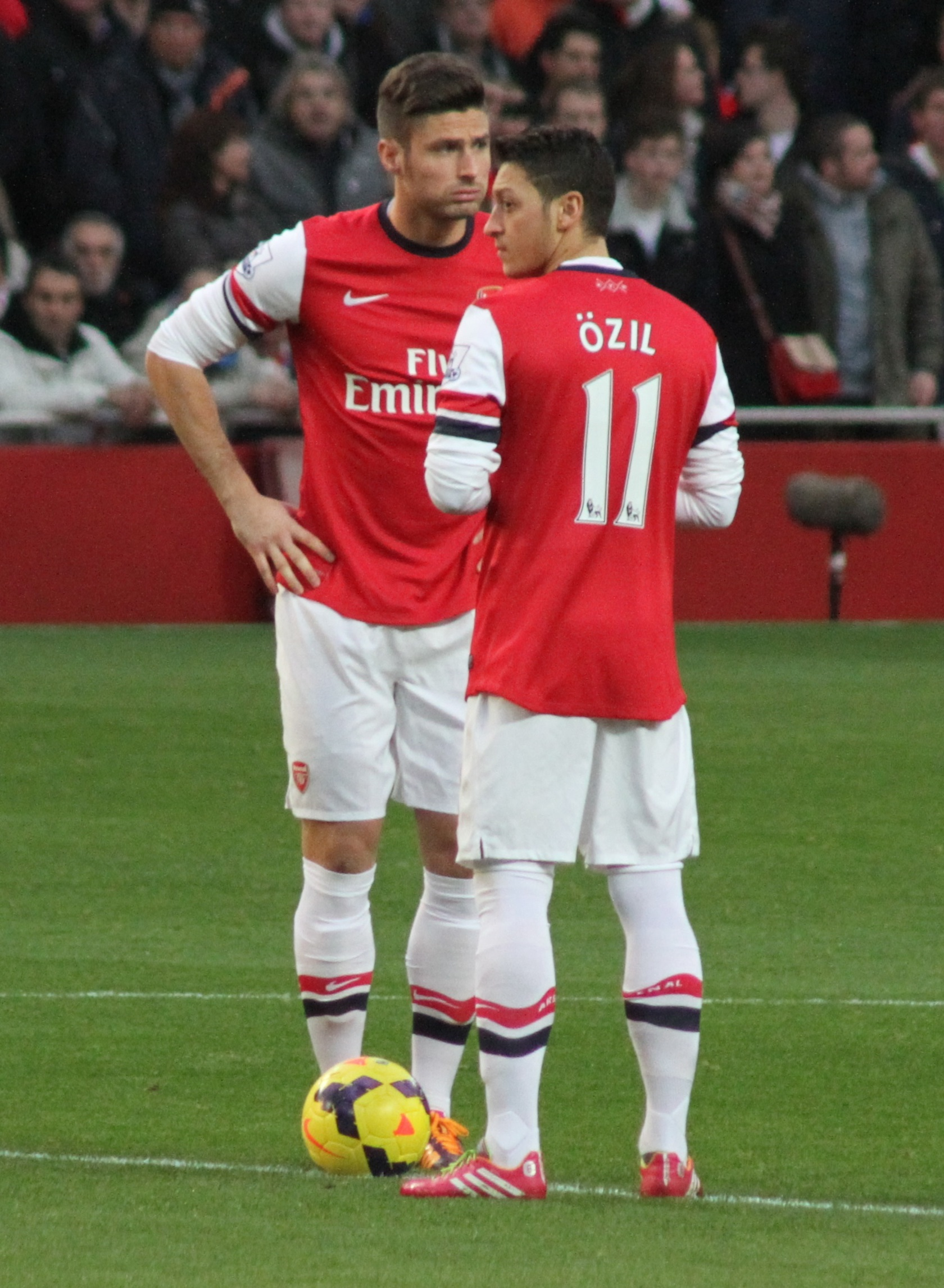
Giroud and Mesut Özil before kick-off against Southampton in November 2013

Giroud scored in the opening game of the Premier League season against Aston Villa, a 3–1 loss for Arsenal. His scored the only goal in the North London derby against Tottenham Hotspur on 1 September. On 26 October, Giroud scored the second goal in a 2–0 win at Crystal Palace, keeping Arsenal at the top of the Premier League, and almost a month later scored a double against Southampton, following a mistake from the Saints' goalkeeper Artur Boruc, and then he converted a penalty in a 2–0 win. Giroud's last goal of 2013, and Arsenal's last of the year, came against Newcastle United. His flicked header from Theo Walcott's free kick gave Arsenal a narrow 1–0 win and placed them at the top of the table going into 2014. He then scored on his return to the first team against Aston Villa after an ankle injury, a match that ended 2–1 in Arsenal's favour.

On 8 March 2014, Giroud scored twice against Everton in the FA Cup quarter-final, helping Arsenal to a 4–1 win. On 12 April, Giroud scored one of the penalties in the shootout against Wigan Athletic to send Arsenal to the final of the FA Cup at Wembley Stadium. On 17 May, Giroud started in the 2014 FA Cup final as Arsenal beat Hull City 3–2 at Wembley and assisted Aaron Ramsey's cup-winning goal.

Giroud started the season by scoring the third goal in Arsenal's 3–0 win against Manchester City in the 2014 FA Community Shield, a 25-yard shot which dipped over goalkeeper Willy Caballero, thus winning Giroud's second title for Arsenal. Despite only coming on as a half-time substitute, he was named man of the match. Shortly after scoring the equaliser in a 2–2 draw against Everton on 22 August, he broke his left tibia and was ruled out for four months.

On 30 September 2014, his 28th birthday, Giroud signed a new contract at Arsenal, keeping him at the club until 2018 and increasing his weekly wage to £80,000. Giroud returned to action quicker than expected, replacing Aaron Ramsey for the last 13 minutes of a 1–2 home defeat against Manchester United on 22 November and scoring Arsenal's consolation goal in added time. Later, he scored twice in a 4–1 home victory against Newcastle United on 13 December. Thirteen days later, he was sent off in Arsenal's 2–1 win over Queens Park Rangers for a headbutt on Nedum Onuoha after being pushed by the QPR defender. He later returned from his three-game suspension to feature in a 3–0 victory at home against Stoke City on 11 January. On 18 January, he scored the second goal in a 2–0 victory against Manchester City, giving the gunners their first victory at the City of Manchester Stadium since 2010. Giroud carried on his Premier League form by opening the scoring and by setting up Mesut Özil for the second goal of the match as Arsenal beat Aston Villa 5–0.

On 15 February, he netted two goals in the space of three minutes as Arsenal defeated Middlesbrough 2–0 to reach the quarter-finals of the FA Cup. His first goal concluded a move in which every Arsenal player touched the ball without Middlesbrough taking possession.

On 25 February, Giroud was substituted 60 minutes into Arsenal's 3–1 Champions League round of 16 loss to AS Monaco after missing several good chances for his club. Four days later, on 1 March, he scored Arsenal's opening goal in a 2–1 Premier League defeat of Everton. Giroud kept up his fine form by netting one goals each against Queens Park Rangers, West Ham United and two against Newcastle United in the Premier League while also scoring against Monaco in the Champions League. Giroud was announced as the Premier League Player of the Month for March. On 4 April, Giroud scored the fourth goal for his team in a 4–1 win over Liverpool.

On 30 May, Giroud scored Arsenal's fourth goal after appearing as a substitute in the team's 4–0 2015 FA Cup final victory over Aston Villa at Wembley Stadium.

==== 2015–18: Premier League runner-up, third FA Cup ====
Giroud scored Arsenal's first goal of the season, a sideways scissor kick from an Özil assist at Crystal Palace in a 2–1 loss. On 20 October 2015, he came off the bench to score the first goal in a 2–0 win against Bayern Munich in the 2015–16 UEFA Champions League group stage. On 9 December, he scored his first competitive Arsenal hat-trick in a 3–0 away victory at Olympiacos helping the Gunners, who needed a two-goal win, make the last-16 of the Champions League. Giroud scored the first goal in a 2–0 victory over Aston Villa four days later, becoming only the seventh Arsenal player to reach 50 Premier League goals for the club. On 8 March, Giroud ended a 12-match scoreless run, with a brace in a 4–0 away victory over Hull City in a FA Cup replay.

On 8 May 2016, Giroud scored in a 2–2 against Manchester City at the City of Manchester Stadium to end a run of 15 Premier League matches without a goal. He also assisted the team's second goal, scored by Alexis Sánchez. A week later, in the team's final match of the season, Giroud scored a hat-trick against Aston Villa to end 2015–16 with 16 goals in the Premier League and 24 in all competitions.

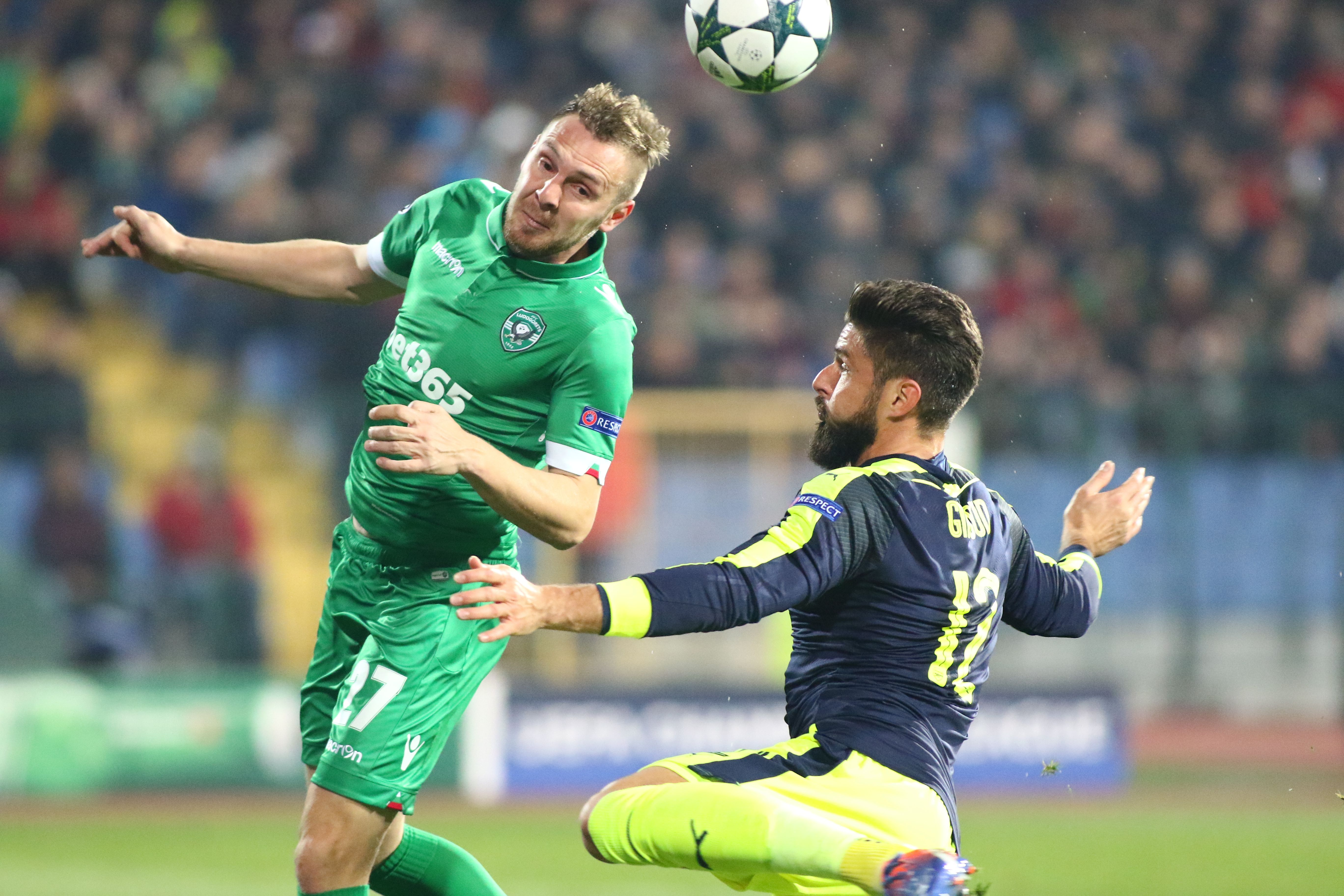
Giroud battling for the ball with Cosmin Moți of Ludogorets in a UEFA Champions League match in November 2016

Giroud made only three appearances in Arsenal's first nine matches of the 2016–17 Premier League, all of them coming on as a substitute. On 29 October 2016, after coming onto the pitch as a substitute in the 69th minute on matchday 10 of the Premier League, Giroud scored two goals with his first two touches in Arsenal's 4–1 away win against Sunderland. On 19 November, Giroud scored an 89th-minute equalising goal after appearing as a substitute in a 1–1 draw with Manchester United at Old Trafford. On 26 December, he scored in a 1–0 home defeat of West Bromwich Albion on his first Premier League start of the season. On 1 January 2017, Giroud scored with a backheeled "scorpion kick" volley in a 2–0 win against Crystal Palace, a goal described by Arsène Wenger as the greatest he had seen at the Emirates Stadium. The goal later earned him the FIFA Puskás Award for the goal of the year.

On 12 January 2017, Giroud, alongside teammates Francis Coquelin and Laurent Koscielny signed a new long-term contract with Arsenal. During the 2017 FA Cup final against Chelsea at Wembley, Giroud came on in the 78th minute with the score 1–1, and a minute later he delivered an assist for Aaron Ramsey to score the winning goal which saw Arsenal lift the Cup for a record-breaking thirteenth time. On 28 September 2017, during Arsenal's Europa League group game away to BATE Borisov, Giroud scored his 100th goal for the club in a 4–2 victory.

=== Chelsea ===
On 31 January 2018, Giroud signed an 18-month contract with Chelsea for an undisclosed fee.

==== 2018–20: Fourth FA Cup and Europa League victory ====
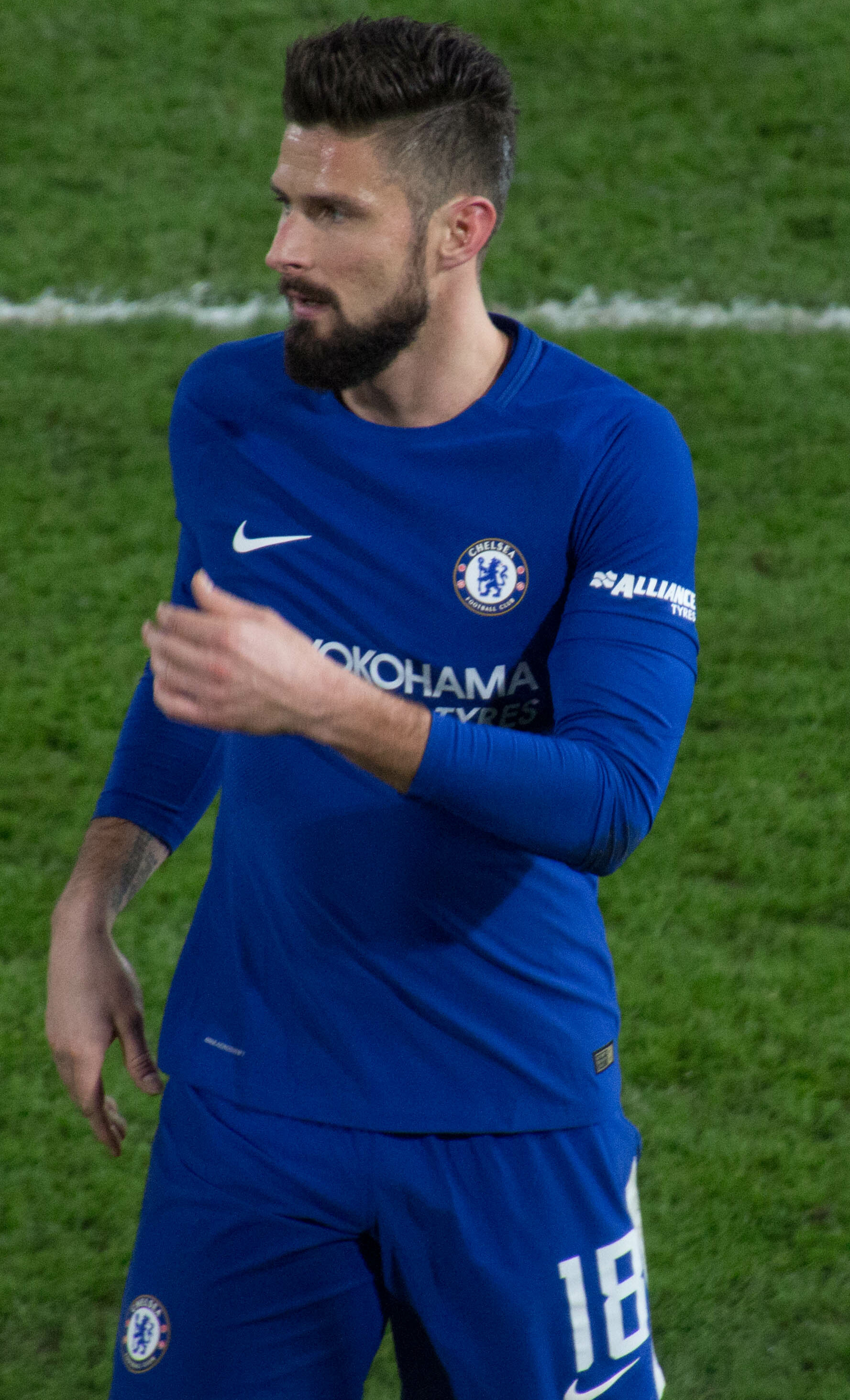
Giroud playing for Chelsea in February 2018

He made his debut five days later in a Premier League away game at Watford, where he came on in the 64th minute replacing Pedro. However, the result was a 4–1 loss. On 12 February, Giroud started his first game for the club in which he provided an assist for Eden Hazard in a 3–0 home win against West Bromwich Albion. He scored his first goal in the FA Cup fifth round against Hull City in the 4–0 home win. On 14 April, Giroud came off the bench to score twice as Chelsea recovered from a 2–0 deficit to beat Southampton 3–2 at St Mary's Stadium. It was his first time scoring in the Premier League with his new club.

On 8 November, Giroud registered his first goal of the season away to BATE Borisov in matchday four of the Europa League group stage. It was the only goal of the match, sending Chelsea through to the knockout stages of the tournament. In his next outing, he scored his first Premier League goal of the season in a 3–1 away loss to Tottenham Hotspur on 24 November. Giroud then made it four goals in three games, bagging a brace at home to PAOK in matchday five of the Europa League. Chelsea won the match 4–0. On his 500th career appearance, Giroud scored a free kick to equalise and preserve Chelsea's unbeaten Europa League group stage campaign. The match against Vidi at MOL Aréna Sóstó finished 2–2. Giroud scored his first Chelsea hat trick on 14 March in a 5–0 (8–0 aggregate) win over Dynamo Kyiv in the second leg of the Europa League round of 16 tie at NSC Olimpiyskiy. The following month, he became the first Chelsea player to score 10 goals in a single European campaign when he scored in a 4–3 semi-final second-leg win over Slavia Prague. In May 2019, he signed a new contract with Chelsea through the 2019–20 season. On 29 May, he scored in Chelsea's 4–1 win over his former club Arsenal in the Europa League final; during the match, he also set-up Hazard's second goal. With 11 goals in the competition, he set a new record for most goals by a French player in a single European season, breaking the previous record held jointly by Nestor Combin (achieved during the 1963–64 European Cup Winners' Cup) and Just Fontaine (achieved during the 1958–59 European Cup).

On 14 August 2019, Giroud scored his first goal of the season against Liverpool in the UEFA Super Cup. Liverpool went on to win the match on penalties (5–4) after a 2–2 scoreline. His first Premier League goal came on 22 February 2020 against Tottenham in a 2–1 home win. On 20 May 2020, Giroud signed a new one-year contract with Chelsea. On 19 July 2020, he scored a goal and helped Chelsea to reach their 14th FA Cup final after beating Manchester United 3–1 in the semi-final. Giroud finished the league season with a goal in Chelsea's 2–0 win over Wolves on 26 July, a result which secured Chelsea a place in the 2020–21 UEFA Champions League. The goal was also his fifth goal in six matches and sixth overall since the restart of football following the COVID-19 pandemic.

==== 2020–21: Final season and Champions League victory ====
At Chelsea, when you are not scoring enough goals they might pick up another striker to replace you. Maybe in a club like Chelsea you have less time to show your qualities than at Arsenal. That's the main difference and the last 10 years show that Chelsea have won more trophies. At Chelsea [...] you have to be good sooner.

— Giroud, reflecting on his time at Chelsea.

On 23 September 2020, Giroud made his first appearance in 2020–21 season from the bench and scored his first goal of the season against Barnsley in the third round of the EFL Cup, which ended in a 6–0 win at home. He scored the winning goal for Chelsea in stoppage time against Rennes in the Champions League on 24 November; the victory secured Chelsea's progression to the knockout phase of the competition. On 2 December, Giroud became the oldest player in Champions League history to score a hat-trick when he scored all four goals in a 4–0 win at Sevilla. He also became the oldest player to achieve the feat in the European Cup since Real Madrid's Ferenc Puskás in September 1965 (38 year and 173 days against Feyenoord). On 5 December, Giroud marked his first league start of the season with his fifth goal against Leeds United and landed himself in the Premier League's record books after continuing his remarkable goalscoring form. He became the oldest player to ever score in six successive Premier League starts at the age of 34 years and 63 days. He also became the first Chelsea player to score in six consecutive Premier League starts for the club since Jimmy Floyd Hasselbaink in October 2001. On 8 December, Giroud marked his 100th appearance for Chelsea in a 1–1 home draw against Krasnodar in the Champions League final group stage match.

On 15 February 2021, Giroud became the 17th player in Premier League history to make 100 substitute appearances when he replaced an injured Tammy Abraham in the first half of Chelsea's match against Newcastle; Giroud would go on to open the scoring in an eventual 2–0 win. On 23 February, he executed a bicycle kick that scored the only goal in a 1–0 win over Atlético Madrid in the Champions League round of 16. Giroud was an unused substitute as Chelsea defeated Manchester City 1–0 in the 2021 UEFA Champions League final on 29 May. Although Giroud's contract was due to expire at the end of season, with him having numerous offers to join as a free agent, on 4 June 2021, however, Chelsea announced that a one-year contract extension clause was unilaterally triggered earlier in April, thus keeping the player at the club for the upcoming season.

=== AC Milan ===
==== 2021–22: Serie A champion ====
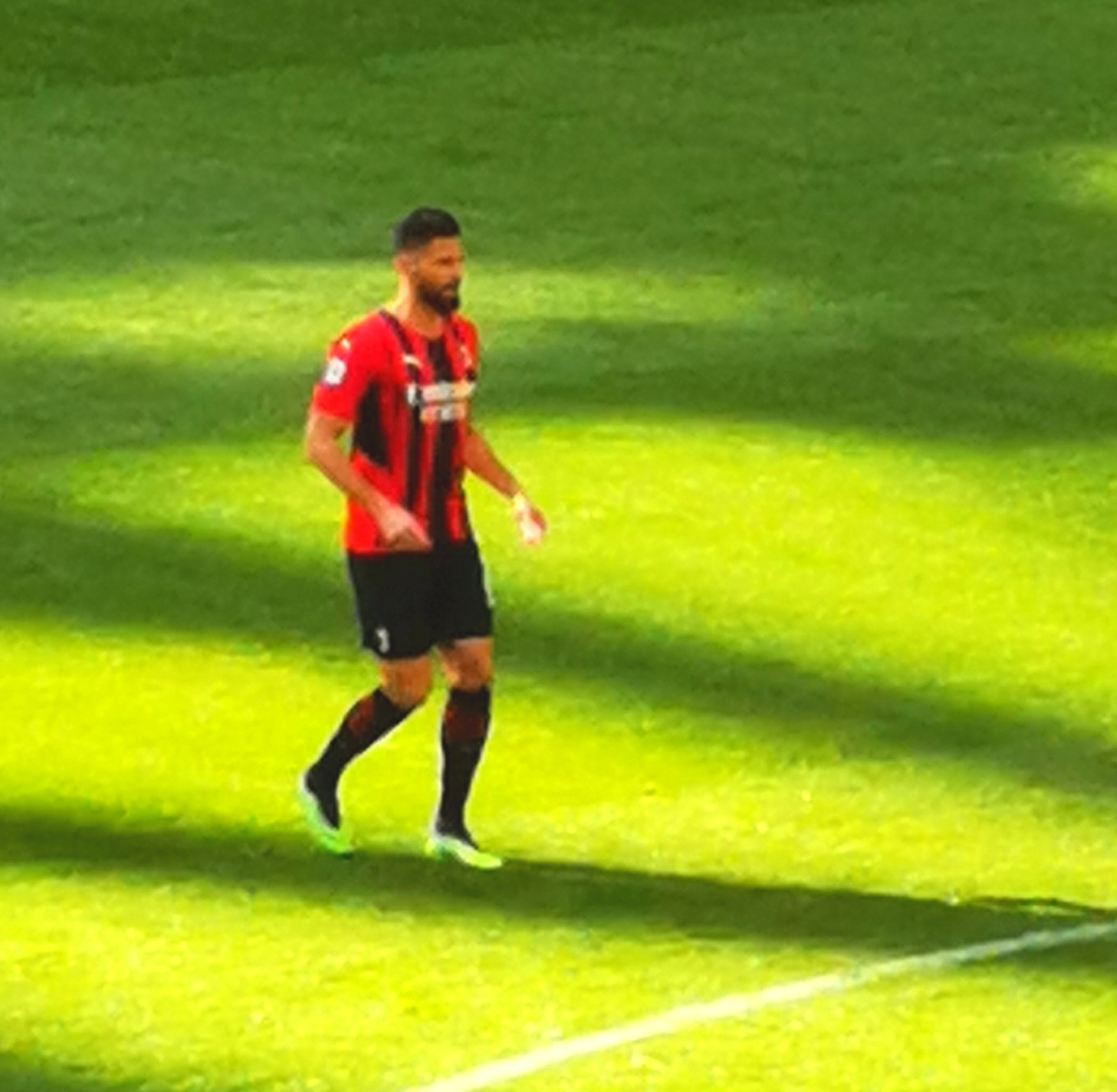
Giroud playing for AC Milan in February 2022

On 17 July 2021, AC Milan announced the transfer of Giroud from Chelsea permanently on a two-year contract. He made his debut for the club on 23 August, in a narrow 1–0 win against Sampdoria, and scored his first goals, a brace, in a 4–1 win against Cagliari. Afterwards, Giroud would struggle in his first months of the season, following the effects of COVID-19, which he had tested positive and various injuries, but proved to be decisive on the following months, when his side was trailing by 2–0, he scored the opener for Milan to help his team achieve a comeback 3–2 win against Hellas Verona on 16 October, and he scored the only goal in Milan's 1–0 win against Torino on 26 October.

On 6 January 2022, he scored the opener against Roma, and helped his teammate Junior Messias scoring the second after Giroud snatched the ball from Roma defense and hit the post, in an eventual 3–1 win. On 5 February, Giroud scored a brace to help his team win 2–1 against crosstown rivals Inter in Derby della Madonnina, becoming the first French player ever to score a brace or more in Serie A against Inter. Four days later, Giroud scored another brace against Lazio in Coppa Italia, as Milan thrashed the former 4–0, progressing to the semi-final of the competition. On 6 March, in Stadio Diego Maradona, although suffering from a deep cut in his left shin, Giroud scored the only goal in an away win against Napoli, helping his team to climb to the top of Serie A table. This was his 11th goal in the season in all competitions, equalling his total tally from the whole of last season for Chelsea.

On 24 April, he scored the equalizer away against Lazio, helping his team to a 2–1 comeback win. On 22 May, he scored a brace as Milan beat Sassuolo 3–0 away from home to win their first Serie A title in eleven years. He ended the Serie A season with 11 goals (14 in all competitions), as he became the oldest player to reach double figures for goals in his debut season in Serie A at 35 years and 234 days. Furthermore, he also became the third French player in AC Milan's history to have reached double figures in a single season after Jean-Pierre Papin and Jérémy Ménez.

==== 2022–23: Champions League semi-finals ====
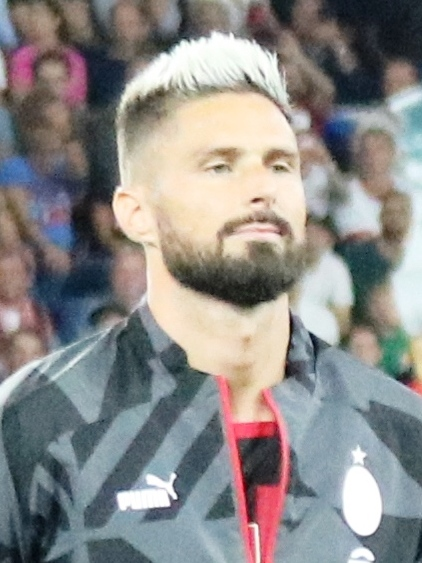
Giroud with Milan in September 2022

He scored his first goal of the season against Bologna on 27 August, a volley in a 2–0 win; this was his 300th senior career goal for club and country. On 3 September, Giroud repeated the feat of the previous season, as he scored and assisted a goal in a 3–2 win against Inter, before scored the winner against Sampdoria in a 2–1 away win the following week. On 14 September, he scored his first Champions League goal for the Rossoneri, by converting a penalty 3–1 away win over Dinamo Zagreb. On 2 November, Giroud a scored a brace and provided two assists, in a 4–0 thrashing of Red Bull Salzburg in their final Champions League group fixture, the result qualified Milan to the round of sixteen.

On 10 February, Giroud scored a near-post header in a narrow home 1–0 win over Torino, to put an end to Milan's seven match winless run in all competitions. On 2 April, Milan defeated league leaders Napoli 4–0 away, the latter's biggest defeat since losing 5–1 to Atalanta in the 2007–08 season. On 18 April, Giroud scored the goal in a 1–1 away draw against the same opponent in the 2022–23 UEFA Champions League quarter-final second leg, which secured his team's progress to the semi-final, by winning 2–1 on aggregate, for the first time since the 2006–07 season. They were knocked out in the semi-finals against arch-rivals Inter, who booked a place in the Champions League final for the first time since 2010. He scored his first Serie A hat-trick on 20 May, in a 5–1 home win against Sampdoria. On 28 May, Giroud scored the winner against rivals Juventus, to grant Milan's qualification to Champions league for the next season, marking in the process his 12th league goal of the season.

==== 2023–24: Last season in Italy ====
On 7 October, Giroud went on to play as a goalkeeper in the final minutes of a league match against Genoa after Mike Maignan was sent off, making a critical save in stoppage time to secure Milan's win after a late goal from Christian Pulisic. He was widely praised for his performance and even named on the Serie A Team of the Week as a goalkeeper. On 7 November, Giroud scored the winning goal in a 2–1 win over Paris Saint-Germain on matchday four of the competition. On 12 November, Giroud played his 100th competitive game for AC Milan, an away 2–2 league draw against Lecce, in which he opened the score with his 40th goal for the club, before being sent off in stoppage time for an argument with the referee. For the incident, he was given a two-game suspension by the league's disciplinary committee.

On 7 March 2024, Giroud scored his first goal in the Europa League for the club, netting the opener in a 4–2 home win against Slavia Prague in the first leg of the round of 16. Two months later, on 13 May, Giroud announced that he would leave the club at the end of the season. On 25 May, Giroud scored in his last competitive match with AC Milan, in an eventual 3–3 draw against Salernitana. Giroud finished the Serie A season with 23 goal involvements (15 goals and eight assists). Overall, during his 3 years stint with AC Milan, he scored a total of 49 goals.

=== Los Angeles FC ===
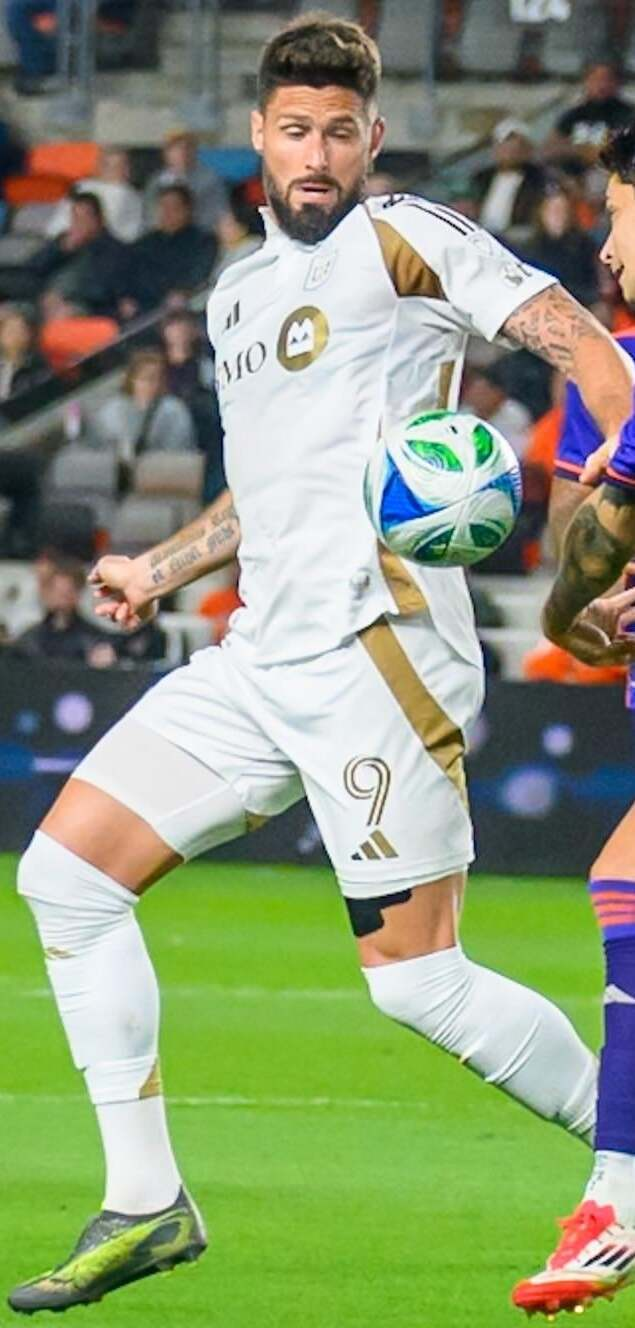
Giroud playing for Los Angeles FC in 2025

On 14 May 2024, Major League Soccer club Los Angeles FC announced that Giroud would join the club in July, following his French teammate Hugo Lloris. He made his debut for the club on 13 August 2024, in a 4–1 win against San Jose Earthquakes in the Leagues Cup knockout round. On 25 August, Giroud scored his first goal for the club in the Leagues Cup final against Columbus Crew in the 3–1 loss. On 25 September, Giroud made his U.S. Open Cup debut in the 2024 final, in which he scored the opening goal, his second for Los Angeles FC, in an eventual 3–1 win over Sporting Kansas City.

On 19 April 2025, he scored his first league goal, his third for the club as it drew 3–3 with Portland Timbers, becoming at 38 years 6 months and 19 days the oldest ever European (Note: Preki was born in Yugoslavia but played for US national team) to score in the league. On 27 June, Los Angeles FC announced the mutual decision to terminate Giroud's contract. He made his final appearance for the club two days later in a league 1–0 defeat to Vancouver Whitecaps, ending his spell with a total of 38 appearances and five goals scored.

=== Lille ===
"I think the French people are happy that Paul Pogba and I are coming back in the French league. [...] This club ticked a lot of boxes for me and my family. I hope that I can be helpful for the team, being like a leader and a link player on and off the pitch [...] between the management, the staff and the young players. Lille is a big club in France, top five. [...] I'm here to give back to football what I learned."

— Giroud about his comeback to France and signing for Lille

On 1 July, after leaving Los Angeles FC unattached, Giroud officially signed for Ligue 1 club Lille on a one-year contract, returning to France and Ligue 1 following his one-year stint in the United States and Major League Soccer. According to various columnists and reporters, the details of the agreement include an annual salary around €1.5m gross and an additional year in option. He was given the squad number 9 which was previously worn by club legend Jonathan David. Making his return to his homeland France, he stated : "I'm very happy and excited to be back in France, home. I've always considered Lille a top French club. I know a lot of former Lille players, like Eden, Yo Cabaye, Debuch', Rio, Ben' Pavard... They all have great memories of the club, with good values. The team had a great season last season and will be playing in the Europa League. It's a young and talented squad, which needs experienced players like me. So I'll also be there in that role."

On 17 August, in his first official game with Lille, he opened the scoring in a 3–3 draw with Brest, becoming at 38 years, 10 months and 18 days Lille's oldest goalscorer ever, beating José Fonte's record. On 25 September, in a 2–1 win against Norwegian side Brann in the first game of the 2025–26 UEFA Europa League league phase, he scored his first continental goal with Lille, to become at 38 years, 11 months and 26 days the oldest French goalscorer in an UEFA club competition.

== International career ==
=== 2001–12: Youth level and early senior career ===
Prior to representing the senior national team, Giroud did not earn any caps with the national youth teams. In 2001, he was called up to the under-16 team alongside the likes of Yoann Gourcuff, Yohan Cabaye, and Sylvain Marveaux by coach Pierre Mankowski to participate in a training camp held at the Clairefontaine academy. After the camp, Giroud was not called up for the duration of the 2001–02 under-16 campaign.

On 3 November 2011, in an effort to reward Giroud for his performances domestically with Montpellier, national team coach Laurent Blanc named the striker in the squad to play in friendly matches against the United States and Belgium on 11 and 15 November 2011, respectively. Giroud described the call up as "a childhood dream come true", while also stating it is "immensely satisfying and a privilege" to represent the national team. He made his international debut in the match against the United States appearing as a substitute. France won the match 1–0. Against Belgium, Giroud earned another cap appearing as a substitute as the match ended 0–0. On 29 February 2012, Giroud scored his first career international goal in a 2–1 friendly victory over Germany. Three months later, he was named to the squad to participate in UEFA Euro 2012. Two days prior to the announcement of the final squad, Giroud assisted on two goals in France's 3–2 friendly comeback win over Iceland.

=== 2012–15: First major tournaments ===
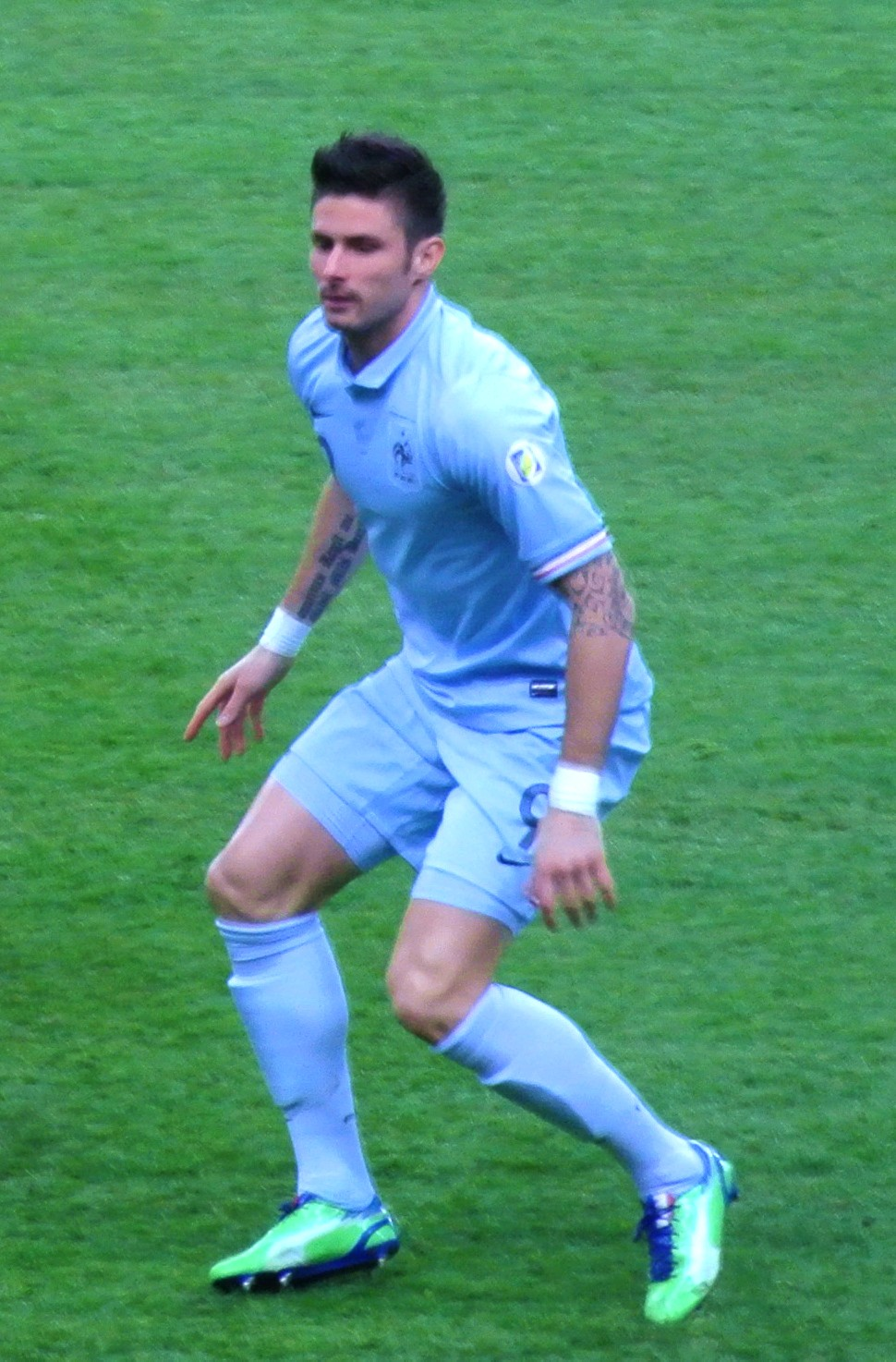
Giroud playing for France against Georgia in March 2013

On 16 October 2012, Giroud equalised for France in its 1–1 draw against Spain in a 2014 FIFA World Cup qualifier. Coming on as a substitute in the 88th minute, he scored a headed goal from a Franck Ribéry cross in the fourth minute of injury time. Due to his goal against Spain and good form with Arsenal, Giroud, along with Arsenal teammate Laurent Koscielny, received a call for France's tie against Italy on 14 November. In the match, Giroud had a few chances, but then was substituted with five other players in the second half as France came back from behind to win the match 2–1. Giroud scored twice and was named man of the match in a 6–0 win over Australia on 11 October 2013 in an international friendly.

On 13 May 2014, Giroud was named in Didier Deschamps's squad for the 2014 FIFA World Cup. After appearing as a second-half substitute in France's opening match against Honduras, Giroud was named in the starting line-up for the team's second group fixture against Switzerland. He scored the opening goal of the match in the 17th minute to record his first FIFA World Cup goal and the 100th at the tournament in the French national team's history, as Les Bleus ran out 5–2 winners to qualify for the knockout stage.

=== 2016–18: Euro 2016 runner-up and FIFA World Cup triumph ===
In the opening match of Euro 2016 on 10 June 2016, France defeated Romania 2–1. Giroud earned his 50th France cap by being in the starting line-up of that match and played every minute of it; he scored the opening goal by heading Dimitri Payet's cross into the goal in the 57th minute. He scored a brace in a 5–2 win against Iceland in the quarter-finals. Following France's defeat to Portugal in the final of the tournament, Giroud finished the competition as the joint second-highest scorer, with 3 goals and 2 assists, and was awarded the Bronze Boot.

In a 2018 World Cup qualifier against Luxembourg in March 2017, which France won 3–1, Giroud scored twice, taking his total to 23 and moving him into his country's top ten goalscorers of all time.

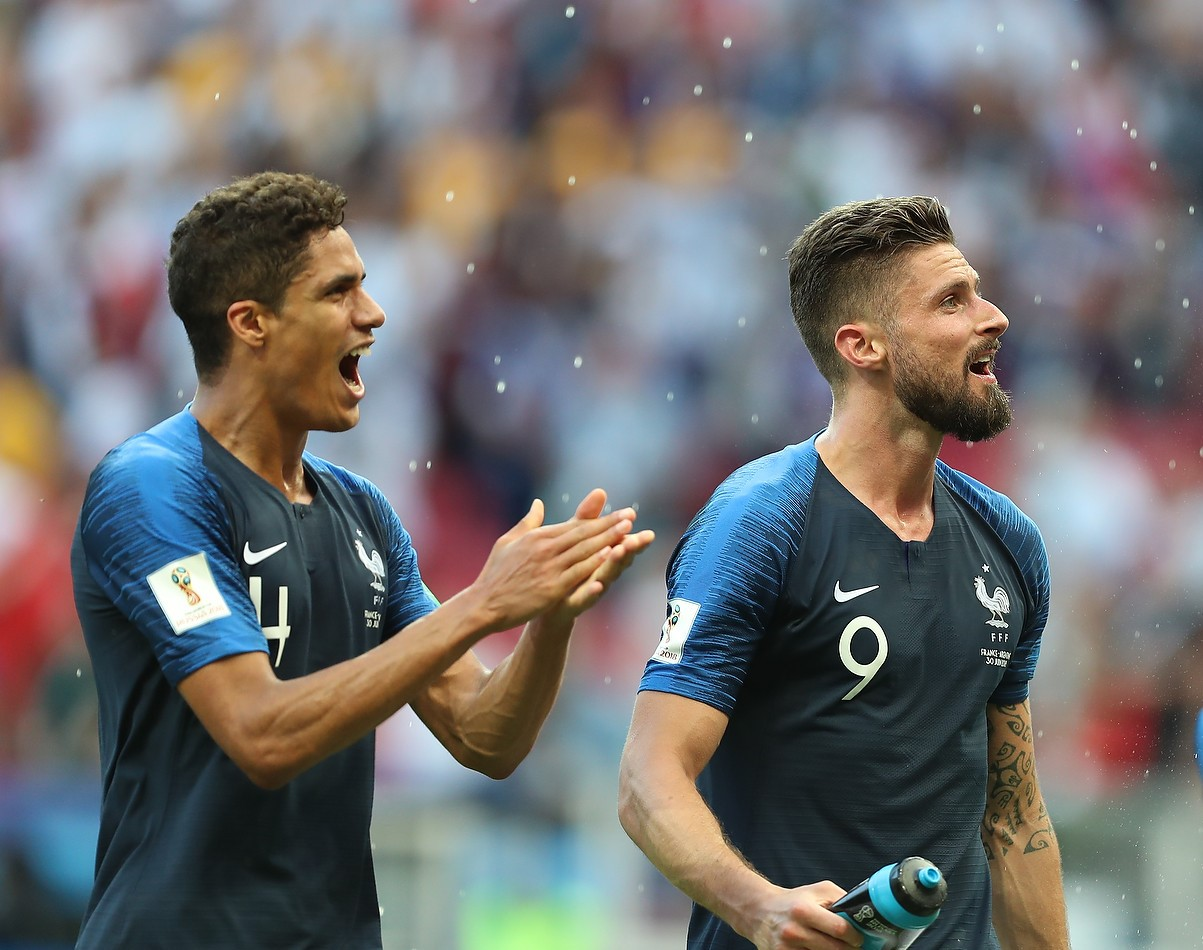
Giroud (right) with Raphael Varane at the 2018 FIFA World Cup

On 2 June 2017, Giroud scored a hat-trick at Roazhon Park for France in a friendly against Paraguay which finished 5–0 to the hosts. In that game, he also become the first player to score a hat-trick for Les Bleus in 17 years.

On 17 May 2018, he was called up to the 23-man France squad at the 2018 FIFA World Cup in Russia. On 28 May 2018, Giroud scored his 31st international goal for France during a home game against Ireland, equalling Zinedine Zidane's record, and becoming the fourth highest goal scorer of all time for the country. Giroud's inclusion in the team as a big man towering over opposing defenders was designed to create more space and freedom for Antoine Griezmann and Kylian Mbappé to generate offensive chances; his role in the team was compared to that of Stéphane Guivarc'h in the 1998 France World Cup-winning side. Giroud played in all seven matches, and though he failed to register a shot on target from 13 shots, his physical presence and link-up play was credited with Griezmann and Mbappé each scoring four goals. On 30 June 2018, Giroud set up Mbappé's second goal in a 4–3 win over Argentina. In the final of the tournament on 15 July, France defeated Croatia 4–2 to win their second FIFA World Cup title.

=== 2019–21: Post-World Cup victory and Nations League title ===
In March 2019, Giroud scored goals in two UEFA Euro 2020 qualifiers against Moldova and Iceland, taking his tally to 35 for France. In doing so, he surpassed David Trezeguet to become the nation's third-highest goalscorer of all time, behind only Thierry Henry and Michel Platini. On 8 September 2020, Giroud scored his 40th goal for France in a 4–2 UEFA Nations League victory against Croatia. On 7 October 2020, Giroud played his 100th match for France, where he also scored twice in a 7–1 win against Ukraine, giving him 42 goals in his international career to surpass Platini's total and rank second for France. On 8 June 2021, he scored twice in a warm-up friendly for the Euro 2020 against Bulgaria, reaching his tally up to 46 goals, thus being only 5 down to French national team top goalscorer Thierry Henry. In October, Giroud was part of the French team that won the 2020–21 UEFA Nations League, with France defeating Spain 2–1 in the final.

=== 2022–24: All-time France top scorer, second consecutive World Cup final, and international retirement ===
On 22 September 2022, in a UEFA Nations League 2-0 win against Austria, he scored a goal to become France's oldest ever goalscorer at 35 years, 11 months, and 23 days.

Giroud was called up to the French squad for the 2022 FIFA World Cup in Qatar; he started as the team's lone striker in their opening match against Australia on 22 November, scoring two goals and equalling Thierry Henry's 51-goal record for France. He broke the record and became the national team's all-time top scorer after netting a goal against Poland in the round of 16 on 4 December. On 10 December, he scored the winning goal against England, helping France reach the semi-finals. France lost to Argentina in the final on penalties after a 3–3 draw, with Giroud being substituted near the end of the first half. With four goals, he was awarded the tournament's Bronze Boot.

On 23 May 2024, Giroud announced that he would retire from international football after Euro 2024.

On 5 June 2024, he came on as a substitute in a friendly game against Luxembourg, to become France's oldest ever player at 37 years, 8 months, and 6 days.

His final match was on 9 July 2024, a substitute appearance in a 2–1 Euro 2024 semi-final defeat against Spain.

== Style of play ==
Giroud is capable of playing in several offensive positions, but usually plays as a striker or as a centre-forward; he has also occasionally been used as a second striker, or even as a false 9. A hard-working striker, he is known in particular for his reliable goal scoring rate, size, physical strength, heading accuracy, powerful shot, ability to hold up the ball with his back to goal, and link-up play, or create space for his teammates with his movement off the ball. He is also associated with making runs to the front post that outwit defenders. Due to his playing style and penchant for scoring goals after coming off the bench, he has been described as a "target man", and as a "super sub" in the media. He has also been described by pundits as one of the most underrated strikers in the world.

A 2025 article and interviews stress that he views Mbappé potentially breaking his record as a source of pride rather than rivalry, framing his scoring record as something he is happy to see surpassed by the next generation.

== Outside football ==
=== Personal life ===
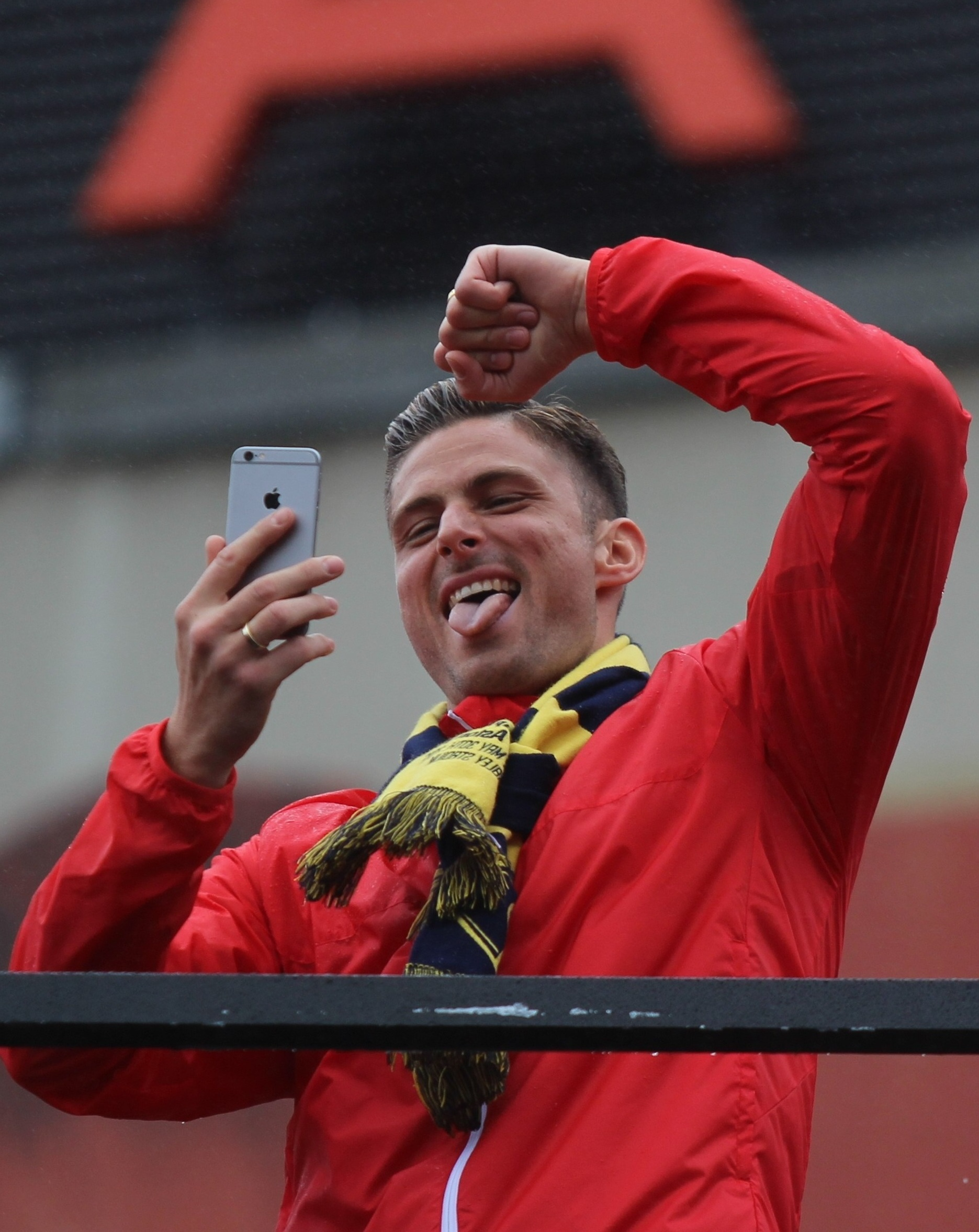
Giroud in 2015

Giroud has an older brother, Romain, who was also a footballer, having played at the Auxerre academy and having represented France at under-15 and under-17 level, however he dropped a potential professional career to study and become a nutritionist.

Giroud has been married to Jennifer since 2011 and have four children together. Giroud is a devout Christian and has a tattoo on his right arm from Psalm 23 in Latin: "Dominus regit me et nihil mihi deerit" ("The Lord is my shepherd: I shall lack nothing). He describes himself as a "very believing person [...] I don't cross myself before my games but I do a little prayer". In February 2014, Giroud reportedly cheated on his wife with model Celia Kay. After the incident, he issued an apology to his wife but later insisted that he had not committed adultery. Arsène Wenger, Giroud's manager at Arsenal at the time, did not comment on the matter, saying he wanted to "respect his privacy".

In June 2023, Giroud auctioned the jersey he wore during France's 2022 FIFA World Cup quarter-final victory to support Armenian victims of the blockade of the Republic of Artsakh. The jersey sold for €35,000 at a fundraiser to help persecuted Christians around the world.

=== Media ===
In 2014, he became the face of Hugo Boss's Boss Bottled men's fragrance. In an interview with GQ, he cited David Beckham as an inspiration for the way he looks, saying that Beckham's "style is iconic".

Giroud has been sponsored by Puma since 2009. He starred, together with countryman Antoine Griezmann, in an advert for the brand, which was released in August 2016. Often using elaborate moves in his goal celebrations, Giroud's 'Glamour slide' goal celebration was included in EA Sports' FIFA 16.

On 13 November 2018, Sony Pictures France confirmed on Twitter that Giroud had landed a role in the French-dubbed version of Spider-Man: Into the Spider-Verse (known as Spiderman: New Generation in France) as the voice of the Green Goblin. He was joined by Presnel Kimpembe, who took on the role of Scorpion.

== Career statistics ==
=== Club ===
As of match played 21 November 2026

Appearances and goals by club, season and competition
| Club | Season | League | | | National cup (Note: Includes Coupe de France, FA Cup, Coppa Italia, U.S. Open Cup) | | League cup (Note: Includes Coupe de la Ligue, Football League/EFL Cup) | | Continental | | Other | | Total | |
| Club | Season | Division | Apps | Goals | Apps | Goals | Apps | Goals | Apps | Goals | Apps | Goals | Apps | Goals |
|---|---|---|---|---|---|---|---|---|---|---|---|---|---|---|
| Grenoble | 2005–06 | Ligue 2 | 6 | 0 | 0 | 0 | 0 | 0 | — | | — | | 6 | 0 |
| Grenoble | 2006–07 | Ligue 2 | 17 | 2 | 2 | 0 | 1 | 0 | — | | — | | 20 | 2 |
| Grenoble | Total | | 23 | 2 | 2 | 0 | 1 | 0 | — | | — | | 26 | 2 |
| Istres (loan) | 2007–08 | Championnat National | 33 | 14 | 0 | 0 | 1 | 0 | — | | — | | 34 | 14 |
| Tours | 2008–09 | Ligue 2 | 23 | 9 | 3 | 5 | 1 | 0 | — | | — | | 27 | 14 |
| Tours | 2009–10 | Ligue 2 | 38 | 21 | 2 | 1 | 2 | 2 | — | | — | | 42 | 24 |
| Tours | Total | | 61 | 30 | 5 | 6 | 3 | 2 | — | | — | | 69 | 38 |
| Montpellier | 2010–11 | Ligue 1 | 37 | 12 | 1 | 0 | 3 | 1 | 2 (Note: Appearances in UEFA Europa League) | 1 | — | | 43 | 14 |
| Montpellier | 2011–12 | Ligue 1 | 36 | 21 | 4 | 2 | 2 | 2 | — | | — | | 42 | 25 |
| Montpellier | Total | | 73 | 33 | 5 | 2 | 5 | 3 | 2 | 1 | — | | 85 | 39 |
| Arsenal | 2012–13 | Premier League | 34 | 11 | 4 | 2 | 2 | 2 | 7 (Note: Appearance(s) in UEFA Champions League) | 2 | — | | 47 | 17 |
| Arsenal | 2013–14 | Premier League | 36 | 16 | 5 | 3 | 1 | 0 | 9 | 3 | — | | 51 | 22 |
| Arsenal | 2014–15 | Premier League | 27 | 14 | 5 | 3 | 0 | 0 | 3 | 1 | 1 (Note: Appearance in FA Community Shield) | 1 | 36 | 19 |
| Arsenal | 2015–16 | Premier League | 38 | 16 | 5 | 3 | 2 | 0 | 7 | 5 | 1 | 0 | 53 | 24 |
| Arsenal | 2016–17 | Premier League | 29 | 12 | 4 | 2 | 1 | 0 | 6 | 2 | — | | 40 | 16 |
| Arsenal | 2017–18 | Premier League | 16 | 4 | 0 | 0 | 3 | 0 | 6 | 3 | 1 | 0 | 26 | 7 |
| Arsenal | Total | | 180 | 73 | 23 | 13 | 9 | 2 | 38 | 16 | 3 | 1 | 253 | 105 |
| Chelsea | 2017–18 | Premier League | 13 | 3 | 4 | 2 | — | | 1 | 0 | — | | 18 | 5 |
| Chelsea | 2018–19 | Premier League | 27 | 2 | 1 | 0 | 3 | 0 | 14 | 11 | 0 | 0 | 45 | 13 |
| Chelsea | 2019–20 | Premier League | 18 | 8 | 3 | 1 | 0 | 0 | 3 | 0 | 1 (Note: Appearance in UEFA Super Cup) | 1 | 25 | 10 |
| Chelsea | 2020–21 | Premier League | 17 | 4 | 4 | 0 | 2 | 1 | 8 | 6 | — | | 31 | 11 |
| Chelsea | Total | | 75 | 17 | 12 | 3 | 5 | 1 | 26 | 17 | 1 | 1 | 119 | 39 |
| AC Milan | 2021–22 | Serie A | 29 | 11 | 4 | 3 | — | | 5 | 0 | — | | 38 | 14 |
| AC Milan | 2022–23 | Serie A | 33 | 13 | 1 | 0 | — | | 12 | 5 | 1 (Note: Appearance in Supercoppa Italiana) | 0 | 47 | 18 |
| AC Milan | 2023–24 | Serie A | 35 | 15 | 1 | 0 | — | | 11 (Note: Six appearances and one goal in UEFA Champions League, five appearance and one goal in UEFA Europa League) | 2 | — | | 47 | 17 |
| AC Milan | Total | | 97 | 39 | 6 | 3 | 0 | 0 | 28 | 7 | 1 | 0 | 132 | 49 |
| Los Angeles FC | 2024 | MLS | 10 | 0 | 1 | 1 | — | | — | | 8 (Note: Four appearances and one goal in Leagues Cup, four appearances in MLS Cup playoffs) | 1 | 19 | 2 |
| Los Angeles FC | 2025 | MLS | 11 | 3 | — | | — | | 4 (Note: Appearances in CONCACAF Champions Cup) | 0 | 4 (Note: One appearance in FIFA Club World Cup play-in, three appearances in FIFA Club World Cup) | 0 | 19 | 3 |
| Los Angeles FC | Total | | 21 | 3 | 1 | 1 | 0 | 0 | 4 | 0 | 12 | 1 | 38 | 5 |
| Lille | 2025–26 | Ligue 1 | 30 | 7 | 2 | 0 | — | | 12 | 4 | — | | 44 | 11 |
| Lille | 2026–27 | Ligue 1 | 9 | 3 | 0 | 0 | — | | 4 | 0 | — | | 13 | 3 |
| Lille | Total | | 40 | 10 | 2 | 0 | – | | 15 | 4 | — | | 57 | 14 |
| Career total | | | 603 | 221 | 56 | 28 | 24 | 8 | 114 | 45 | 17 | 3 | 814 | 305 |

=== International ===
Appearances and goals by national team and year
| National team | Year | Apps | Goals |
|---|---|---|---|
| France | 2011 | 2 | 0 |
| France | 2012 | 12 | 2 |
| France | 2013 | 12 | 3 |
| France | 2014 | 9 | 4 |
| France | 2015 | 10 | 4 |
| France | 2016 | 14 | 8 |
| France | 2017 | 10 | 8 |
| France | 2018 | 18 | 4 |
| France | 2019 | 10 | 6 |
| France | 2020 | 8 | 5 |
| France | 2021 | 5 | 2 |
| France | 2022 | 10 | 7 |
| France | 2023 | 9 | 3 |
| France | 2024 | 8 | 1 |
| Total | | 137 | 57 |

== Honours ==
Montpellier

- Ligue 1: 2011–12

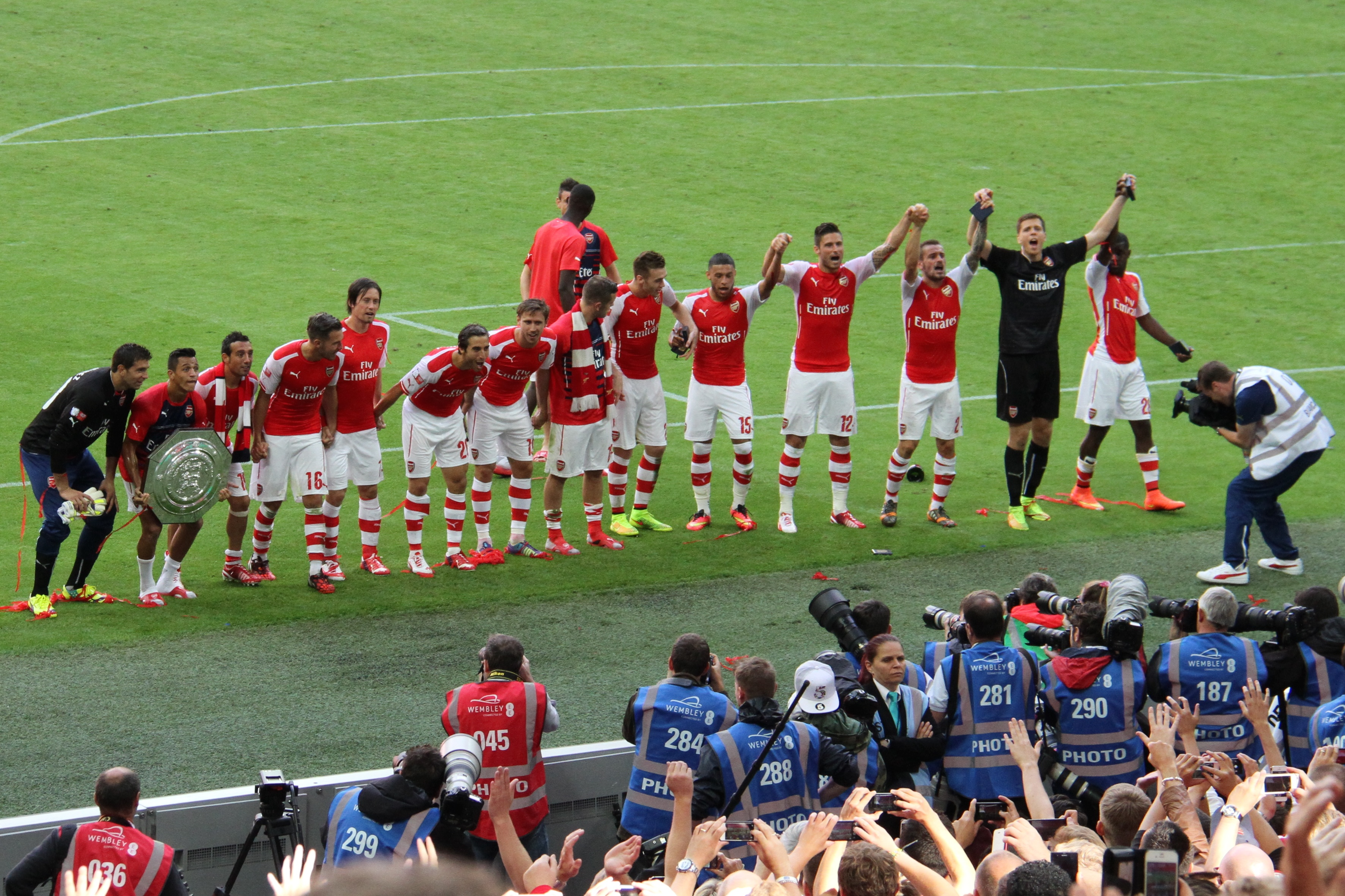
Giroud (number 12, both hands raised) celebrating the 2014 FA Community Shield with Arsenal

Arsenal

- FA Cup: 2013–14, 2014–15, 2016–17
- FA Community Shield: 2014, 2015, 2017

Chelsea

- FA Cup: 2017–18; runner-up: 2019–20, 2020–21
- UEFA Champions League: 2020–21
- UEFA Europa League: 2018–19
- EFL Cup runner-up: 2018–19

AC Milan

- Serie A: 2021–22

Los Angeles FC

- U.S. Open Cup: 2024
- Leagues Cup runner-up: 2024

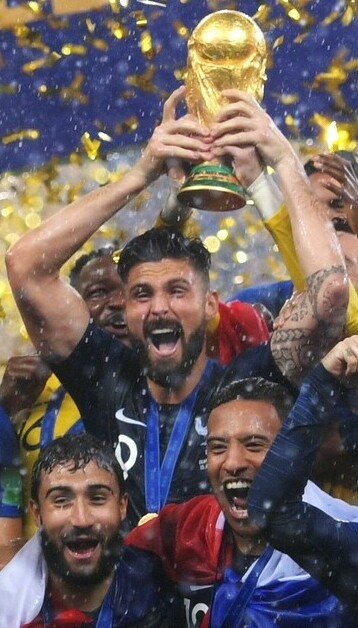
Giroud lifting the FIFA World Cup Trophy

France

- FIFA World Cup: 2018; runner-up: 2022
- UEFA European Championship runner-up: 2016

Individual

- UNFP Ligue 1 Team of the Year: 2011–12
- Ligue 1 top goalscorer: 2011–12
- Premier League Player of the Month: March 2015
- UNFP Ligue 2 Player of the Year: 2009–10
- Ligue 2 top goalscorer: 2009–10
- UNFP Ligue 2 Team of the Year: 2009–10
- Ligue 2 UNFP Player of the Month: September 2009, November 2009
- UEFA European Championship Bronze Boot: 2016
- FIFA Puskás Award: 2017
- FIFA World Cup Bronze Boot: 2022
- UEFA Europa League top goalscorer: 2018–19
- UEFA Europa League Squad of the Season: 2018–19
- Chelsea Goal of the Season: 2020–21

Orders

- Knight of the Legion of Honour: 2018

== See also ==
- List of men's footballers with 100 or more international caps
- List of men's footballers with 50 or more international goals
- List of FIFA World Cup top goalscorers
