= History of Arsenal F.C. (1966–present) =

History of an English football club

The history of Arsenal Football Club from 1966 to the present day covers the third, fourth, and fifth periods of success in Arsenal's history, including three Doubles, a Cup Double, and success in European football, and an unbeaten league season.

Following Bertie Mee's appointment in 1966, Arsenal won the Inter-Cities Fairs Cup, their first European trophy, in 1969–70, and their first League and FA Cup double in 1970–71. The Double-winning side, however, was soon broken up and the following decade was characterised by a series of near misses: Arsenal lost three FA Cup finals (1971–72, 1977–78, and 1979–80) and the 1979–80 Cup Winners' Cup final on penalties. The club's only success during this time was an FA Cup win in 1978–79 against Manchester United.

After stagnation in the 1980s, the return of former player George Graham as manager in 1986 brought a third period of glory. Arsenal won the League Cup in 1986–87, the Football League Centenary Trophy in 1988, two League title wins in 1988–89 and 1990–91, the FA Cup and League Cup double in 1992–93 and a second European trophy, the Cup Winners' Cup, in 1993–94. However, Graham's reputation was tarnished when it was revealed that he had taken kickbacks for signing certain players and he was sacked in 1995.

Arsenal's fifth period of success came with the appointment of Arsène Wenger in 1996. Under him, Arsenal won a second league and cup double in 1997–98 and then a third in 2001–02. In addition, the club were victorious in the 2002–03 and 2004–05 FA Cups, and won the Premier League in 2003–04 without losing a single match. In 2005–06 Arsenal became the first London club to reach the UEFA Champions League final, but lost 2–1 against Barcelona. During the following close season, they left their longstanding home of Highbury to the new Emirates Stadium nearby. They started in their new home with a seven-year trophy drought, followed by winning three FA Cups in the next four seasons.

== The first Double (1966–76) ==
After Arsenal's manager Billy Wright was dismissed in June 1966, club physiotherapist Bertie Mee was appointed as acting manager. Mee, a former winger whose playing career was cut short by injury, joined the Royal Army Medical Corps, where he trained as a physiotherapist before joining the club. Mee sought to undo the effects of Wright's dismal tenure and reinvigorate a team that hadn't won a major honour in over 13 seasons, marking the club's most unsuccessful period since the 1920s. The duo signed several players, including inside-forward Colin Addison, full-back Bob McNab from Huddersfield Town, and forward George Graham, who joined from Chelsea as part of an exchange involving the departing Tommy Baldwin. Arsenal finished seventh at the end of the 1966–67 season, showing an impressive improvement from its 14th-place finish in Wright's final season. It was also the first season Arsenal played in the Football League Cup. They exited the competition in the third round after a 3–1 defeat to West Ham United at Highbury.

Don Howe was chosen to replace the outgoing chief coach Dave Sexton the following season. Arsenal lost two successive League Cup finals in 1968 and 1969. In the second loss, the club were infamously defeated by Third Division side Swindon Town. After leading Arsenal since the 34th minute, a Swindon goalkeeping mistake pounced upon by Bobby Gould extended the match into extra time. Two goals from Don Rodgers meant that Swindon completed an unprecedented upset against Arsenal who were humiliated. However, that season was not a total disaster for Arsenal; they had also finished fourth, which won them a place in Europe for the 1969–70 season.

In turn, this led to the club collecting their first silverware in seventeen years and also their first European trophy, the 1969–70 Inter-Cities Fairs Cup. Arsenal beat Ajax 3–1 on aggregate in the semi-finals, and then staged a famous comeback against Anderlecht in the final. Arsenal were 3-0 down after 74 minutes of the first leg at Stade Émile Versé, but Ray Kennedy got a late away goal to give the Gunners a glimmer of hope; in the second leg in front of a packed Highbury, inspired by captain Frank McLintock, Arsenal won 3–0 with goals from John Radford, Eddie Kelly and Jon Sammels, to win the tie 4–3 on aggregate.

The same season, Arsenal had only finished 12th in the league, perhaps distracted by their European campaign, and did not look like league contenders. Yet the following season, 1970–71, Arsenal went on to become only the second club of the 20th century to win the FA Cup and League Double, the club's first. After a bright start Arsenal looked to be out of the title chase with a 5–0 loss to Stoke City in September. However, Arsenal recovered and put in a strong run (they did not lose again in the league until January), and as the season closed they became involved in a tight race with Leeds United.

Arsenal were pushed all the way – after being defeated 1–0 by Leeds in April, they needed to beat or draw 0–0 with North London rivals Tottenham Hotspur at White Hart Lane on the last day of the season to take the title on goal average. An 87th-minute goal by Ray Kennedy gave Arsenal a 1–0 lead, and despite Spurs' desperate attempts for an equaliser, Arsenal hung on to win and take the title. In the meantime, Arsenal had also reached the FA Cup Final, following a titanic semi-final battle with Stoke which saw them come from 2–0 down to force a replay and eventual victory. In the final, five days after the win at Tottenham, Arsenal beat Liverpool 2–1 at Wembley; Arsenal went 1–0 down early in extra time, before Eddie Kelly's 101st-minute equaliser from close range. Ten minutes later, Charlie George scored the winner from the edge of the penalty area to win the game, and the Double, for Arsenal.

The Double proved to be a premature high point of a decade characterised by a string of near-misses. Despite signing World Cup winner Alan Ball for a club record £220,000 in the close season, Arsenal began 1971–72 badly, losing three matches in August, and were forced to play catch-up for the rest of the season, ultimately finishing fifth. Their debut in the European Cup started encouragingly, but they were knocked out in the quarter-finals by a Johann Cruyff-inspired Ajax, who went on to win the trophy as part of a hat-trick of European titles. Arsenal also reached the FA Cup final for a consecutive season; in a repeat of the 1968 League Cup final they lost 1–0 to Leeds United, in an ugly match of few real chances. Arsenal finished as First Division runners-up in 1972–73, but within a year the Double-winning side had been broken up, and Mee was unable to build a new team in its place. The club's form declined sharply, finishing 16th in 1974–75 and 17th in 1975–76, their lowest in more than forty years, which prompted Mee's resignation. Tottenham manager Terry Neill, a former Arsenal player, was appointed in his place, despite never leading Spurs anywhere beyond mid-table, to become Arsenal's youngest-ever manager.

== Terry Neill and stagnation (1976–86) ==
Arsenal moved back into the top half of the table, inspired in part by the emergence of Irish superstar Liam Brady. Brady formed part of a large Irish contingent at Highbury, which included Pat Rice, Frank Stapleton, Pat Jennings Sammy Nelson, John Devine and the young David O'Leary. Further to this were experienced signings such as Malcolm Macdonald and Alan Hudson, as well as the return of Don Howe, who had been part of the backroom staff when the Double was won, to the Arsenal coaching setup.

Although they could not challenge the League dominance of Liverpool at the time, towards the end of the decade they proved their mettle in the FA Cup. Arsenal reached three consecutive finals (1978, 1979, and 1980), but won only one, the 1979 final against Manchester United. Largely inspired by Brady, Arsenal went 2–0 up through Brian Talbot and Frank Stapleton and looked to be coasting to victory; with five minutes to go, United scored twice in quick succession to level the match. Extra time loomed, but Alan Sunderland converted Graham Rix's cross in injury time to secure a famous 3–2 win.

The next season, 1979–80, proved to be cruel as Arsenal played a record-breaking 70 matches and reached two cup finals, only to end the season empty-handed. Arsenal were favourites to beat Second Division West Ham United in the FA Cup final, but lost 1–0 to a Trevor Brooking header. Meanwhile, they had also reached the Cup Winners' Cup final against Valencia, after Paul Vaessen's goal had given them a famous victory over Juventus in the semi-finals; the final finished goalless and Arsenal lost on penalties, with Brady and Rix having their efforts saved.

Liam Brady left Arsenal for Juventus in the summer of 1980, and the team entered another barren spell. They continued to finish in the top four at the start of the 1980s, but never really looked like winning the title, and they could not rediscover their FA Cup form either – aside from 1982–83 when Arsenal reached both cup semi-finals only to be knocked out in both by Manchester United. Neill struggled to control his team at times; throughout his tenure, he had fallings-out with many of his players (including Hudson and Macdonald) and he was unable to contain the drinking culture within the squad. His signings to replace the departed Brady and Stapleton failed to make the same impact, and towards the end of Neill's reign the club suffered several embarrassing cup defeats; this included losing to part-timers K.F.C. Winterslag in the 1981–82 UEFA Cup and Third Division Walsall in the 1983–84 League Cup. Neill was sacked in December 1983, soon after the latter result.

Don Howe, Neill's assistant, succeeded him but he could not get the side anywhere near a trophy either. Although Arsenal managed to finish sixth and seventh under him, they never seriously challenged for the title (although they did briefly top the league in October 1984) and were dumped out of the 1984–85 FA Cup by Third Division York City. The fans were getting increasingly disillusioned with the club's muddling performances and attendances started to dip beneath 20,000. In March 1986, after hearing the board had approached FC Barcelona coach Terry Venables as his replacement, Howe resigned. Steve Burtenshaw was briefly caretaker manager but the club decided to look to outside for Howe's long-term successor.

The Arsenal board of directors did contact Scottish club Aberdeen with a view to offering the job to their manager Alex Ferguson (while also drawing up an offer to Millwall manager George Graham to become assistant manager of Arsenal), but Ferguson rejected the offer. However, Ferguson did cross the border six months later to succeed Ron Atkinson at Manchester United.

== George Graham and interregnum (1986–96) ==
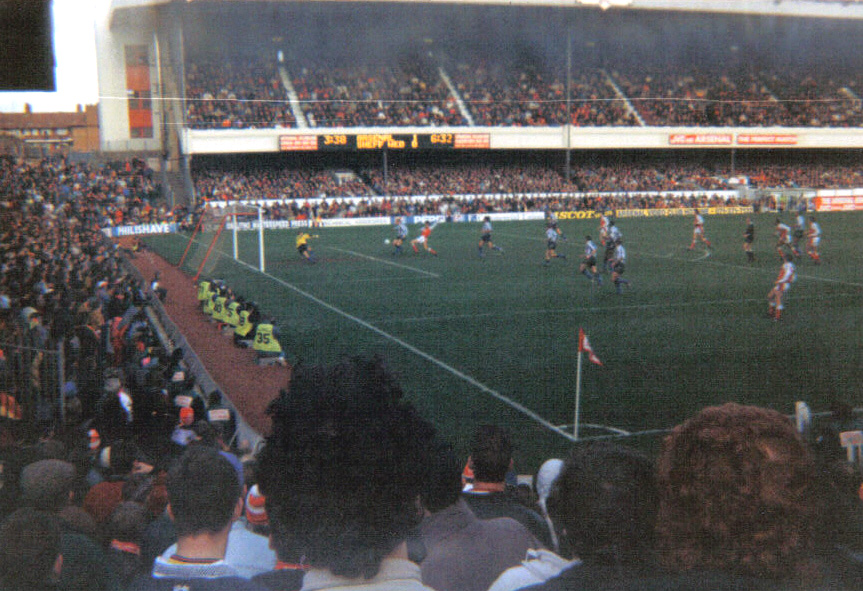
Alan Smith attacking for Arsenal v. Sheffield Wednesday in a match at Highbury in 1992; Arsenal won 7–1

In May 1986, Millwall manager George Graham, a former Arsenal player, was appointed as Howe's long-term replacement, and it was the beginning of a new era of success at Highbury. Graham gradually sold off most of the older players and replaced them with new signings and players promoted from the youth team, while imposing much stricter discipline than his predecessors, both in the dressing room and on the pitch. Arsenal's form immediately improved, so much so that the club were top of the League at Christmas 1986.

Players like Kenny Sansom, Steve Williams, Tommy Caton, Charlie Nicholas and Gus Caesar were gradually discarded and a new-look Arsenal side featured players including Lee Dixon, Nigel Winterburn, Steve Bould, David Rocastle, Alan Smith, Tony Adams and Paul Merson.

Though Arsenal finished fourth in Graham's first season in charge (having led the First Division for most of the winter), Arsenal did win the League Cup, in a campaign marked by comebacks. Arsenal faced Tottenham Hotspur in the semi-finals; after losing 1–0 at Highbury in the first leg and conceding a second goal in the first half of the second leg at White Hart Lane, Arsenal scored twice through Viv Anderson and Niall Quinn to draw 2–2 on aggregate and force a replay; in the replay Spurs went 1–0 up, only for Arsenal to come back again with late goals from Ian Allinson and David Rocastle to win. The final against Liverpool was a repeat performance; after Arsenal had gone 1–0 down to an Ian Rush goal, two Charlie Nicholas goals brought Arsenal their first League Cup triumph and their first major trophy for eight years. However, UEFA voted to continue the ban on English clubs in European competitions that was imposed in the wake of the Heysel disaster in 1985 for a third season, and this meant that Arsenal were unable to compete in the 1987–88 UEFA Cup.

While Arsenal lost the League Cup final the following year in a shock 3–2 defeat to Luton Town and dipped to sixth place in the league, their League form steadily improved afterwards, thanks largely to a revamped defence which consisted of Lee Dixon, Nigel Winterburn, Steve Bould and Tony Adams, which formed the basis of Arsenal's successes for a decade or more. Until he left in 1993, long-serving defender David O'Leary remained an important member of the squad who frequently appeared as a substitute and filled in whenever the younger members of the back four were unavailable. However, during this time Graham's Arsenal were not a purely defensive side; Graham also employed capable midfielders such as David Rocastle, Michael Thomas and Paul Merson, and striker Alan Smith, whose prolific goalscoring regularly brought him more than 20 goals in most of the eight seasons he spent at the club.

In Graham's third season (1988–89), the club won the Football League Centenary Trophy before winning their first League title since 1971, in highly dramatic fashion. Having led the League since Christmas, Arsenal were overtaken by Liverpool after losing to Derby County and drawing at home to Wimbledon in May. Arsenal had seemingly thrown away the title, but the final game of the season, on 26 May, was against Liverpool at Anfield; Arsenal needed to win by two goals to take the title; Liverpool had already won the FA Cup and were favourites to complete the Double. Alan Smith scored for Arsenal early in the second half to make it 1–0, but as time ticked by Arsenal struggled to get a second, and with 90 minutes gone on the clock, Arsenal still needed another goal and it looked as though the league title would be staying at Anfield. But, with only seconds to go, a Smith flick-on found Michael Thomas surging through the Liverpool defence; the young midfielder lifted the ball over Bruce Grobbelaar and into the net, giving Arsenal the title.

Arsenal failed to retain the title the following season; they finished fourth in 1989–90 and fell behind champions Liverpool, runners-up Aston Villa and third-placed Tottenham Hotspur in the title challenge. They also failed to make their mark in the cups, and the post-Heysel ban on English clubs in European competition was still in force at that time, so Arsenal were unable to represent England in the European Cup. The ban was lifted at the end of the season, though Liverpool (the team present at the Heysel disaster) had to serve an extra year.

Graham prepared for another title challenge by signing goalkeeper David Seaman and Swedish winger Anders Limpar in the summer of 1990; both players proved vital as Arsenal retook the title in 1990–91, despite two major setbacks. Arsenal had two points deducted in November 1990 after ten of their players were involved in a brawl with Manchester United players in a match at Old Trafford, and captain Tony Adams was sentenced to four months' imprisonment for drink driving just before Christmas. Despite these setbacks, Arsenal lost only one league match all season and finished seven points clear of Liverpool at the end of what had for most of the season been a two-horse race for the title. They also reached the FA Cup semi-finals, where they faced Tottenham Hotspur; Paul Gascoigne scored with a free kick from 30 yards after just five minutes and Tottenham ran home 3–1 winners, dashing hopes of a unique second Double.

In September 1991, Arsenal paid a club record of £2.5 million for Crystal Palace striker Ian Wright, who would go on to spend seven years at the club and become their all-time leading goalscorer in the process. The 1991–92 season saw the club's first entry in the European Cup for 20 years. The European venture went badly; Arsenal were knocked out by Benfica in the second round and failed to make the lucrative group stage. The season went from bad to worse when the Gunners were knocked out of the FA Cup by lowly Wrexham, though Arsenal recovered to finish fourth in the League. The ban on English clubs in European competitions had been lifted two years earlier, but Arsenal missed out on a UEFA Cup place as English clubs were gradually being phased back into European competitions and at this stage only the second and third placed teams were qualifying for the UEFA Cup.

During the 1992 close season the club acquired Danish midfielder John Jensen, who had just won Euro 1992 with Denmark, scoring a goal in their victory over Germany in the final. Jensen's arrival coincided with the departure of fellow midfielder David Rocastle to Leeds United, the defending league champions. Around this point, Graham altered his tactics; he became more defensive and turned out far less attack-minded sides, which depended mainly on goals from Wright rather than the whole team. Between 1986–87 and 1991–92 Arsenal averaged 66 League goals a season (scoring 81 in 1991–92), but between 1992–93 and 1994–95 they only averaged 48; this included just 40 in 1992–93, when the club finished 10th in the inaugural season of the FA Premier League, scoring fewer than any other team in the division, though they had briefly topped the table in November.

They were founder members of the Premier League on its launch for the 1992–93 season. They lost their first ever Premiership game 4–2 after taking a 2–0 lead over Norwich City at Highbury; Norwich, among the pre-season relegation favourites, were actively involved in the title race and finished third, whereas Arsenal finished 10th.

Arsenal's form in the cups was much better than in the league, and in 1992–93 they became the first side to win the FA Cup and League Cup double. In the League Cup final, Arsenal faced Sheffield Wednesday; a Merson-inspired Arsenal side came from 1–0 down to win 2–1 thanks to a Steve Morrow goal. In the FA Cup, Arsenal beat Spurs 1–0 in the semi-finals (avenging their defeat of 1991), and played Sheffield Wednesday in the final, just as they had done in the League Cup final a few weeks earlier. The game ended 1–1 and went to a replay; Wright opened the scoring for Arsenal but Chris Waddle equalised. Extra time came, and still no goal broke the deadlock until the 120th minute, when Andy Linighan powered home a header from a corner to win the match and the cup double for Arsenal.

In 1993–94, Arsenal won their second European trophy; a side missing key players (John Jensen and Martin Keown were injured, while Ian Wright was suspended), beat holders Parma 1–0 in the Cup Winners' Cup final in Copenhagen, with a tight defensive performance and Alan Smith's 21st-minute goal from a left foot volley. The 1994 Cup Winners' Cup proved to be George Graham's last trophy at the club; the following February the Scot was sacked after nearly nine years in charge, after it was discovered he had accepted an illegal £425,000 payment from Norwegian agent Rune Hauge following Arsenal's 1992 acquisition of John Jensen, one of Hauge's clients.

In the weeks before Graham was sacked, he made three major signings for Arsenal. Glenn Helder, a Dutch winger signed from Vitesse, was a regular first-team player for more than a year after joining the club but was then loaned to Benfica before permanently departing in October 1997 to join NAC Breda back in the Netherlands. Chris Kiwomya, an attacking midfielder signed from Ipswich Town, scored 3 goals in 17 matches before the end of the season but never played for the club again, finally departing in 1998 to sign for Queens Park Rangers. Nineteen-year-old Welsh striker John Hartson was signed from Luton Town and occupied the first-team place vacated by the injury-hit Alan Smith, who retired from playing months later. However, Hartson was not a regular player the following season and was sold to West Ham United in 1997.

George Graham's final season at Arsenal was also the final season at the club for several of the club's key players. Alan Smith, one of his first signings, was forced into retirement by injury several months later. Paul Davis, the club's longest-serving player, was given a free transfer at the season's end, having found his first team opportunities increasingly limited towards the end of his time at Arsenal. Swedish midfielder Stefan Schwarz was sold to Fiorentina that summer after just one season at Highbury. Striker Kevin Campbell, who had struggled to establish himself as a regular player in spite of some impressive performances over five seasons, was sold to Nottingham Forest. Winger Jimmy Carter, who had failed to establish himself as a regular player in four seasons at Arsenal, was sold to Portsmouth.

Assistant manager Stewart Houston took charge until the end of the 1994–95 season, and Arsenal finished 12th in the Premier League. However, they did reach the Cup Winners' Cup final again, after a titanic semi-final against Sampdoria, which they won on penalties after drawing 5–5 on aggregate. Arsenal faced Real Zaragoza in the final; Esnáider scored for the Spaniards and John Hartson equalised for Arsenal. The game was heading to a 1–1 draw and penalties, before midfielder Nayim struck from 40 yards in the 120th minute, in virtually the last kick of the game. David Seaman, who had been Arsenal's hero in the semi-final shootout, could not backpedal fast enough and only got a hand to the ball as it went in.

In June 1995, Arsenal appointed Bruce Rioch, who had just guided Bolton Wanderers to the League Cup final and promotion to the top flight, as manager. He briefly broke the English transfer record by paying Internazionale £7.5 million for Dutch striker Dennis Bergkamp, and the new signing formed an impressive partnership with Ian Wright. Arsenal reached the League Cup semi-finals and finished fifth in the Premiership at the end of 1995–96, securing a place in the following season's UEFA Cup and giving hope for an eventual title challenge. However, the Rioch era ended abruptly: in August 1996, just before the start of the new season, Rioch was sacked after a dispute over transfer funds with the board of directors, triggering a couple of months' turmoil at the club. Stewart Houston was once again put in temporary charge; he remained at the helm for a month, before resigning to take over at QPR. Youth team coach Pat Rice held the fort for several games, before making way for Frenchman Arsène Wenger at the end of September.

== Wenger's arrival (1996–2003) ==
The team immediately improved under Wenger's management, coming third and winning a UEFA Cup place in 1996–97, missing out on second (and a Champions League spot) on goal difference. Wenger rebuilt the Arsenal squad with a crop of French players who were largely unknown in the UK. Patrick Vieira had been signed on Wenger's recommendation before he had officially taken up the reins, and Wenger added Nicolas Anelka and Emmanuel Petit, as well as Dutch winger Marc Overmars in the summer of 1997. Wenger melded the new arrivals with some of the "old guard", retaining Adams, Dixon, Winterburn, Keown and Bould, and he kept Pat Rice on as assistant manager.

Wenger got his first silverware, and became the first foreign manager to win the English league, the following season, when he steered the side to their second double. It had looked like Arsenal were out of the title race by December after losing 3–1 at home to Blackburn, but they overcame a twelve-point deficit to overtake Manchester United; a 4–0 home win over Everton on 3 May won the title with two matches to spare. On 16 May, Arsenal beat Newcastle United 2–0 in the FA Cup final to complete the double. To top it off, the same season Ian Wright broke Cliff Bastin's goalscoring record, bringing his tally to 185 goals before leaving the club in the summer of 1998.

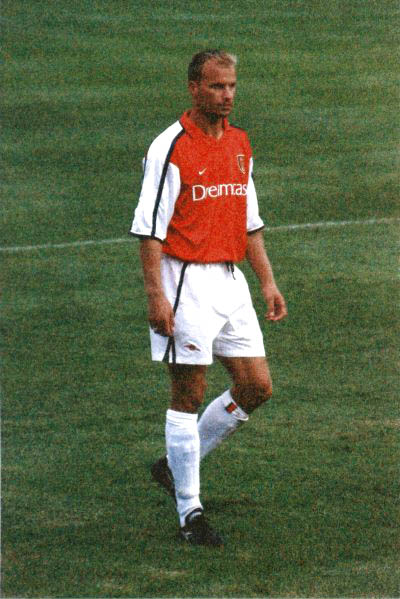
Dennis Bergkamp was a regular in Wenger's early teams.

Despite the signing of Freddie Ljungberg in 1998 and Thierry Henry a year later, a more barren period followed for Arsenal over the next few years, though they came close several times. Arsenal led the League for much of 1998–99, until a 1–0 loss to Leeds United allowed Manchester United to overtake them; Arsenal beat Aston Villa on the last day of the season but United's victory over Spurs meant they took the title. To rub it in further, Arsenal also lost the last ever FA Cup semi-final replay to Manchester United; Dennis Bergkamp had missed a penalty in normal time, and Ryan Giggs scored the winner in extra time after a mazy solo run through the Arsenal defence. Arsenal's return to the Champions League for the first time in seven years was also unsuccessful, as they failed to get past the group stage.

Arsenal came second again in 1999–2000; this time, there was never any real title race and Arsenal finished the season 18 points behind winners Manchester United. Arsenal had another poor season in the Champions League, finishing third in their group; this won them a consolation place in the UEFA Cup, and Arsenal got all the way to the final, where they faced Galatasaray in Copenhagen, the scene of their 1994 Cup Winners' Cup triumph. The match was a tepid affair, a 0–0 draw with few chances; it went to penalties and Arsenal lost after Davor Šuker and Patrick Vieira missed their spot-kicks.

Arsenal again finished second in 2000–01, this time ten points behind Manchester United; the title race had been as good as over since February, when Arsenal lost 6–1 at Old Trafford. Arsenal's season gave priority to the Cups and Europe. They beat Spurs in the semi-finals and met Liverpool in the final at the Millennium Stadium in Cardiff; Arsenal dominated most of the match, and were denied a goal by the arm of defender Stéphane Henchoz, which went unpunished. Arsenal finally did go 1–0 up through Ljungberg but succumbed to two late Michael Owen goals and lost 2–1. In Europe, Arsenal made it to the Champions League quarter-finals for the first time since 1972, only to be eliminated on the away goals rule by eventual finalists Valencia.

By now, Wenger had been forced to rebuild much of the Double-winning side of 1998; Anelka, Overmars and Petit had all left for Spanish clubs in return for hefty fees, while age was finally catching up with the famous back line; Bould and Winterburn had already left, and Adams and Dixon would only last another season before retiring. In their place, Wenger signed the likes of Sol Campbell and Lauren in defence, as well as promoting Ashley Cole from the youth ranks. In midfield, Wenger added the talismanic Robert Pires and signed his compatriot Sylvain Wiltord in attack, while in the meantime Thierry Henry had adapted to the English game to become one of the Premiership's best strikers.

Attack was Arsenal's forté as they won a record-equalling third Double in 2001–02 season; the Gunners were the only team to score in every game of the Premiership season, and went unbeaten in domestic away games. After an initially tight title race (just three points separated the top four in February), Arsenal pulled away from the pack with a 13-game winning streak, finishing seven points ahead of runners-up Liverpool. Arsenal secured the title in the penultimate match of the season with a 1–0 win over Manchester United at Old Trafford, the goal coming from Wiltord. The previous weekend, Arsenal had wrapped up their eighth FA Cup, beating Chelsea 2–0 with goals from Ray Parlour and Freddie Ljungberg.

In 2002–03, Arsenal became the first club in more than 20 years to retain the FA Cup, with a 1–0 victory against Southampton thanks to a Pires goal. Their joy was soured by the fact that they narrowly missed out on retaining the Premiership title. Arsenal had led eventual winners Manchester United by eight points at one stage, but their form collapsed late on in the season; they drew 2–2 away to Bolton Wanderers after leading 2–0, and then lost 3–2 at home to Leeds United a week later, which gave United the title.

== "The Invincibles" and Champions League final (2003–06) ==
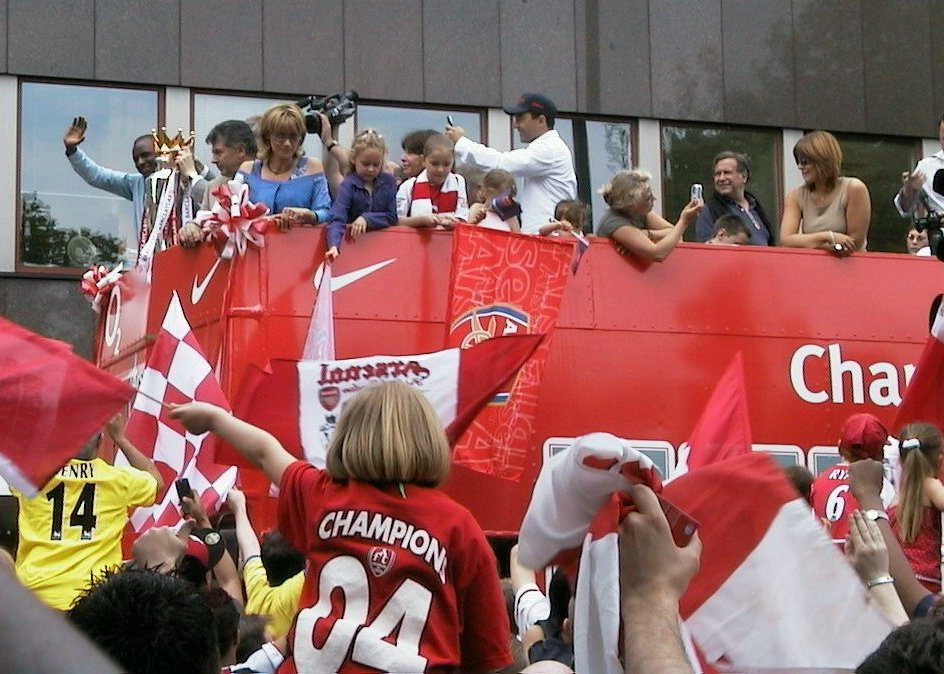
Arsenal's players and fans celebrate their 2004 Premier League win with an open-top bus parade.

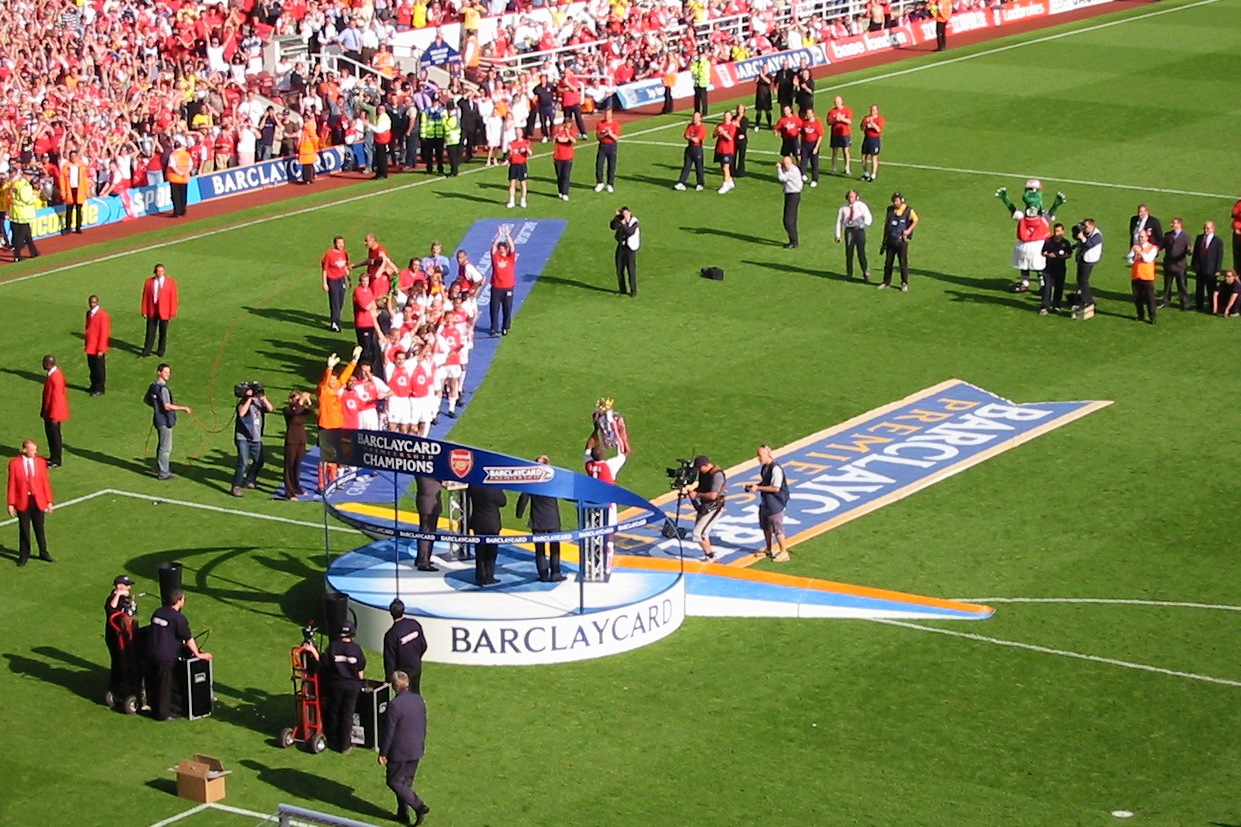
Arsenal captain Patrick Vieira lifts the 2003–04 Premier League trophy.

The defeat to Leeds would be Arsenal's last in the League for over a year. 2003–04 was a record-breaking season for Arsenal, as they won the Premier League unbeaten (26 wins, 12 draws, and zero defeats), finishing 11 points ahead of second-place Chelsea. They became only the second team to do so, the first having been Preston North End in 1888–89. Their rivals for the title gained revenge in other competitions – Arsenal were defeated in the Champions League quarter-finals and FA Cup semi-finals by Chelsea and Manchester United, respectively, in successive matches. Arsenal recovered from being 1–0 and 2–1 behind to Liverpool in their league match at Highbury to win 4–2, thanks to a Thierry Henry hat-trick, and went on to win the league with a 2–2 draw away to Tottenham Hotspur, mimicking their success in 1971.

Arsenal were unable to retain the title in 2004–05, finishing second, 12 points behind a record-breaking Chelsea side. However, the Gunners did stretch their unbeaten run to 49 consecutive matches, an English league football record; the record was equalled with a dramatic 5–3 win over Middlesbrough (Arsenal having trailed 3–1 shortly after half-time) and then surpassed with a 3–0 win over Blackburn Rovers in August 2004, before their unbeaten season was ended with a 2–0 away defeat to Manchester United. This defeat sparked a decline in form and they fell away from title contention before recovering with a late flourish to finish second, sealed with a 7–0 drubbing of Everton in the penultimate match. Champions League glory eluded them again, with the club getting knocked out 3–2 on aggregate by Bayern Munich in the second round. Arsenal still won their third FA Cup in four years, winning 5–4 on penalties after a 0–0 draw where they played with ten men against Manchester United.

Weakened by the sale of captain Patrick Vieira to Juventus in the summer of 2005, Arsenal's 2005–06 season was comparatively disappointing domestically and the club failed to challenge for any trophies at home. In the league, their poor away form dogged them and despite recording some impressive wins at home (5–0 over Aston Villa, and 7–0 over Middlesbrough), Arsenal spent much of the latter stages of the season in fifth place or lower, and looked set to miss out on the Champions League for the first time since 1997. However, they won their last three matches of the season, culminating in a 4–2 victory over Wigan Athletic in the last ever match at Highbury; coupled with Tottenham Hotspur's loss at West Ham the same day, this meant Arsenal pipped Spurs to fourth place and a Champions League spot.

Arsenal's form in Europe in 2005–06 was much stronger; they reached the Champions League final for the first time in their history, becoming the first London club ever to do so. Arsenal finished top of their group unbeaten, above Ajax, Thun and Sparta Prague against whom Thierry Henry scored two goals away to become the all-time record goalscorer for Arsenal; in the knockout stages they beat Real Madrid (becoming the first British team to beat Madrid at the Santiago Bernabéu), Juventus and then Villarreal to reach the final, setting a competition record of ten matches without conceding a goal in the process. In the final, against Barcelona, Arsenal were reduced to ten men early on when goalkeeper Jens Lehmann was sent off for a professional foul; nevertheless they were the ones who scored first, Sol Campbell scoring with a header from a free kick in the 37th minute. Arsenal desperately defended their lead, but two late goals from Samuel Eto'o and Juliano Belletti meant Barcelona ran out 2–1 winners.

== Move to the Emirates (2006–18) ==
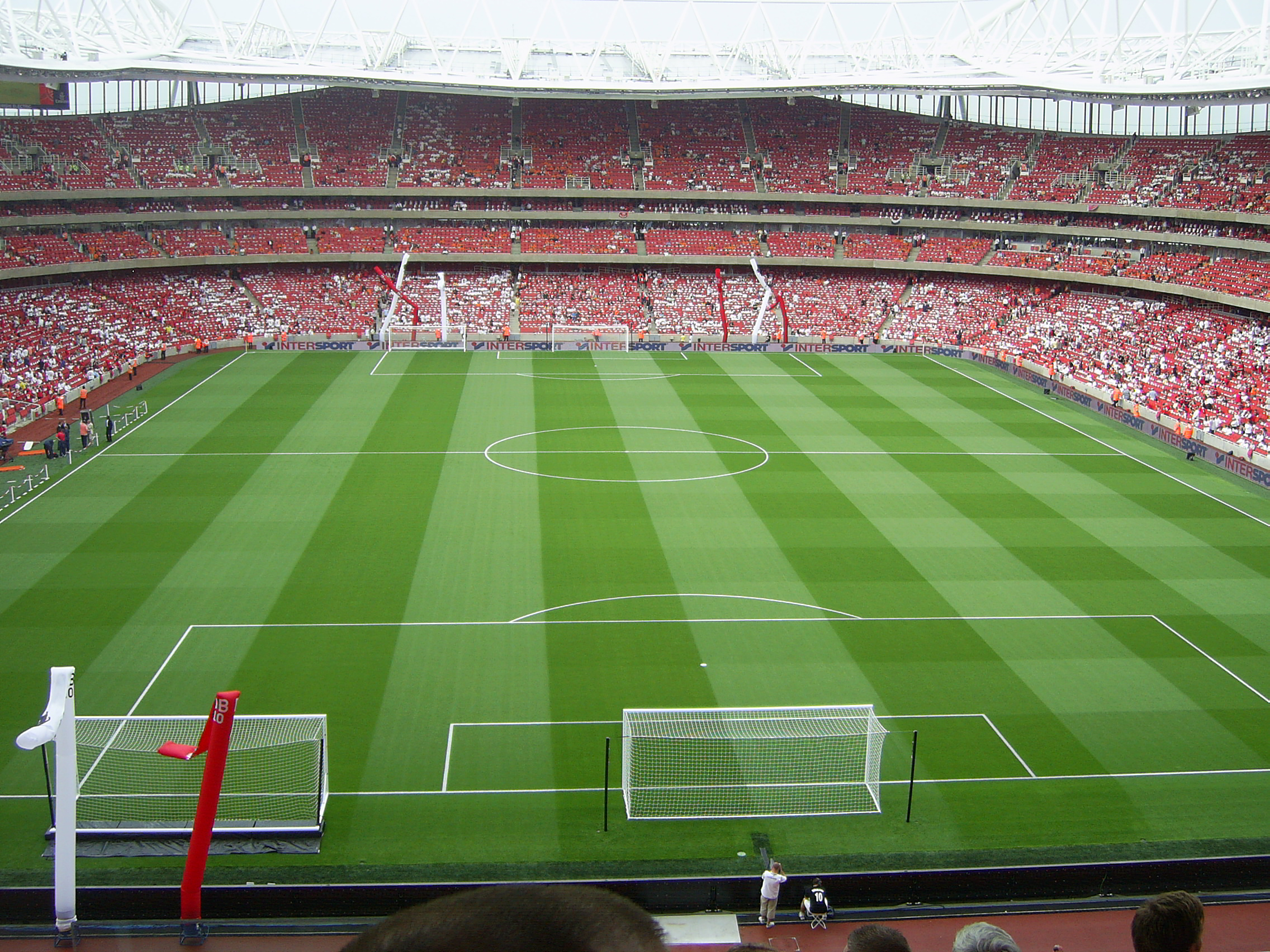
The Emirates Stadium on the day of Dennis Bergkamp's testimonial, the first match to be played there.

Arsenal had been highly successful in the 1990s and 2000s, but Highbury's capacity was limited to only 38,500 in the post-Taylor report era; virtually every match was sold out and the club were unable to maximise matchday revenue. With expansion of Highbury ruled impossible, in 1999, Arsenal announced plans to move to nearby Ashburton Grove; construction started in December 2002 with the demolition of buildings on the site, and in July 2006, the new Emirates Stadium opened, ready for the start of the 2006–07 season.

Arsenal took some time to get used to their new surroundings and as early as November, manager Arsène Wenger conceded that his side was unlikely to make a serious challenge for the title. Dogged by poor away form throughout the season, Arsenal eventually finished fourth, level on points with third-placed Liverpool. With a team largely filled with reserve and younger players, they reached the League Cup final, which they lost 2–1 to Chelsea. They were less successful in other competitions, however, being knocked out early on in both the Champions League and FA Cup.

The move to the Emirates had transitional effects on the pitch as well as off of it, as Arsenal lost a number of the Invincibles side, including Robert Pires, Dennis Bergkamp, Lauren, Ashley Cole and Sol Campbell in 2006, and a year later club captain and all-time record scorer Thierry Henry departed for Barcelona. Wenger built a new side, with the likes of Cesc Fabregas, Emmanuel Adebayor and Theo Walcott being drafted into the side. The young team made a strong bid for the title in 2007–08, completing an unbeaten run of 28 games and leading the league until February, when an injury to striker Eduardo proved a turning point, as the Gunners finished third. The side made two more bids for the title, in 2010 and 2011, but both campaigns followed similar patterns; Arsenal would be involved in the race deep into the season before suffering an untimely loss of form. The club also began making stronger Champions League challenges, reaching the quarter-finals in 2008 and 2010 and the semi-finals in 2009.

However, the young side ultimately failed to win a trophy; the closest the Gunners came was a League Cup final defeat to Birmingham City in 2011. As a result, the side began to break up; Arsenal lost Fabregas and Samir Nasri in 2011 and captain Robin van Persie in 2012. In the 2011–12 and 2012–13 seasons, Arsenal were fighting for the top four as they struggled to compete with the financial advantages held by Manchester United, Chelsea and Manchester City. In Europe, Arsenal were eliminated in the last-16 stage of the Champions League for seven consecutive years between 2011 and 2017, despite recording a famous first-leg win over Barcelona in 2011.

Arsenal's nine-year trophy drought came to an end in 2014, as they won the FA Cup for the fifth time under Wenger. A new era had begun with the signing of German superstar Mesut Özil from Real Madrid in summer 2013 for £42.4 million to break the club's transfer record. The Gunners had a fine start to the league season, leading the table until February before once again they lost their form in the key months to finish fourth; however, in the FA Cup, Arsenal reached the final without travelling outside London, and, after going 2–0 down inside eight minutes to Hull City, turned it around to win 3–2 and end their trophy drought. The Gunners retained the cup with a 4–0 thumping of Aston Villa in 2015, having signed Chilean striker Alexis Sanchez from Barcelona in the summer. In 2016 Arsenal record their highest league finish at the Emirates, finishing second behind 5000–1 underdogs Leicester City, having once again led the league in February.

In 2017, they won the FA Cup for a record thirteenth time, and a record seventh under Wenger, who became the most successful manager in the competition's history, but fell out of the top four for the first time since 1996, finishing fifth to end their 19 consecutive appearances in the Champions League. In the next season, the Gunners were knocked out of the UEFA Europa League at the semi-final stage, and reached the League Cup final for the third time under Wenger, losing 3–0 to Manchester City, but endured an eventful off-pitch season; they lost Theo Walcott, Olivier Giroud and Alexis Sanchez in January and twice broke the club's transfer record, for Alexandre Lacazette in the summer and Gabonese Pièrre-Emerick Aubameyang in January. Arsène Wenger announced his resignation after 22 years in charge, leaving as the club's longest-serving and most successful manager, and former Paris Saint-Germain manager Unai Emery took over.

== Post-Wenger years (since 2018) ==
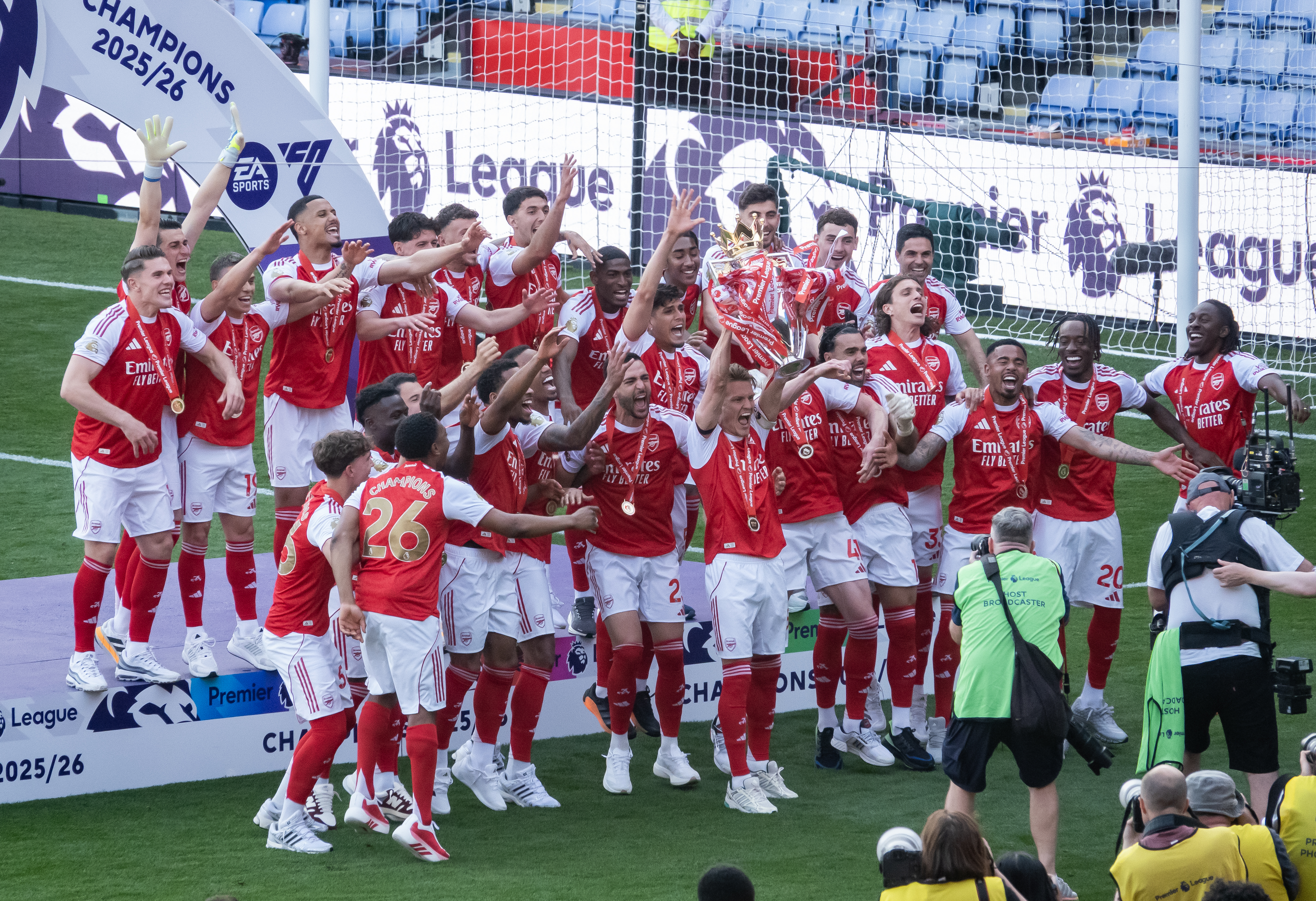
Arsenal captain Martin Ødegaard lifts the 2025–26 Premier League trophy.

Despite early promise, Emery's Arsenal reign was ultimately short-lived, as he was sacked just 18 months into the job. After a 22-match unbeaten start to the season, they failed to return to the Champions League, finishing fifth in the league. In the Europa League, Arsenal reached the final, their first in Europe in 13 years, but lost 4–1 to Chelsea in Baku. A nine-game winless run in October–November of the next season resulted in Emery being dismissed from his position as head coach of the first team by the Arsenal board.

After a three-week caretaker stint from assistant manager and former Invincible Freddie Ljungberg, Arsenal hired former club captain Mikel Arteta as head coach, with Arteta having been previously working as assistant with Pep Guardiola at Manchester City. However, less than three months into Arteta's reign, the season was suspended due to the COVID-19 pandemic. After the season's resumption in June 2020, with all matches played behind closed doors, Arsenal secured 8th in the league, but made up for it with a record-extending 14th FA Cup win, which came just 28 games into Arteta's reign; Pierre-Emerick Aubameyang, installed as captain in November, scored twice in a 2–1 win over Chelsea in the final.

Despite displaying some early-season promise, Arsenal once again finished 8th in the league in 2020–21, and were eliminated in the semi-finals of the Europa League, meaning they would play the 2021–22 season without European football for the first time since 1995–96. In April 2021, the club was one of the twelve founding members of the breakaway European Super League, but withdrew after heavy public backlash. In the 2021–22 season, Arsenal found themselves bottom of the league at the end of August, but recovered to challenge for the top four spots. In May, they held pole position over Tottenham Hotspur but eventually finished fifth, and exited both cup competitions in January, to Nottingham Forest in the FA Cup third round and Liverpool in the EFL Cup semi-finals.

In the following season, Arsenal won all of their games in August 2022, a complete reverse from the previous year, and were top of the league by the time the 2022 World Cup in Qatar began. After occupying top spot for the majority of the season, only four wins in the final two months of the season meant that they finished as runners-up to Manchester City, and they had broken the record for most days spent at the top without winning the league title. They were also knocked out of the FA Cup by City in the fourth round as well.The 2023–24 season saw Arsenal finish second in the league behind City again, along with the Gunners competing in the Champions League for the first time since 2017, appearing in the quarter-finals after 14 years as they defeated Porto on penalties in the round of 16. The Gunners set a record for Premier League wins with 27 on 12 May 2024, against Manchester United at Old Trafford. They would finish the season with 28 league wins with a victory against Everton at the Emirates. In 2024–25, Arsenal finished second for a third straight season, 10 points behind Liverpool and reached the Champions League semi-finals for the first time since 2009, ultimately being knocked out by eventual winners Paris Saint-Germain.

In the 2025–26 season, Arsenal went on to win the Premier League in GW37 with a 1–1 draw between Manchester City and AFC Bournemouth. The title was Arsenal's first Premier League title under manager Arteta. They also reached their second-ever Champions League final, going unbeaten throughout the competition until the final against Paris Saint-Germain, which they lost 4–3 on penalties, after drawing 1–1 from 120 minutes of play.

== See also ==
- History of Arsenal F.C. (1886–1966)
- The Invincibles (English football)

== Bibliography ==
- Rippon, Anton (1981). The Story of Arsenal. Ashbourne, Derbyshire: Moorland Publishing. ISBN 0-86190-023-5.
- Soar, Phil; Tyler, Martin (2005). The Official Illustrated History of Arsenal (13th ed.). London: Hamlyn. ISBN 0-600-61344-5 – via Internet Archive.
- Spurling, Jon (2004). Rebels for the Cause: The Alternative History of Arsenal Football Club. Mainstream. ISBN 978-1-84018-900-1.
