= IFFHS World's Best International Goal Scorer =

Annual football award

IFFHS World's Best Man International Goal Scorer
- Sport: Association football
- Awarded for: Best international goal scorer of the calendar year
- Presented by: International Federation of Football History & Statistics

History
- First award: 1991
- Editions: 35
- First winner: (France) Jean-Pierre Papin
- Most wins: (Portugal) Cristiano Ronaldo (5 awards)
- Most recent: (Norway) Erling Haaland (29 goals in 2025)
- Website: iffhs.com/en

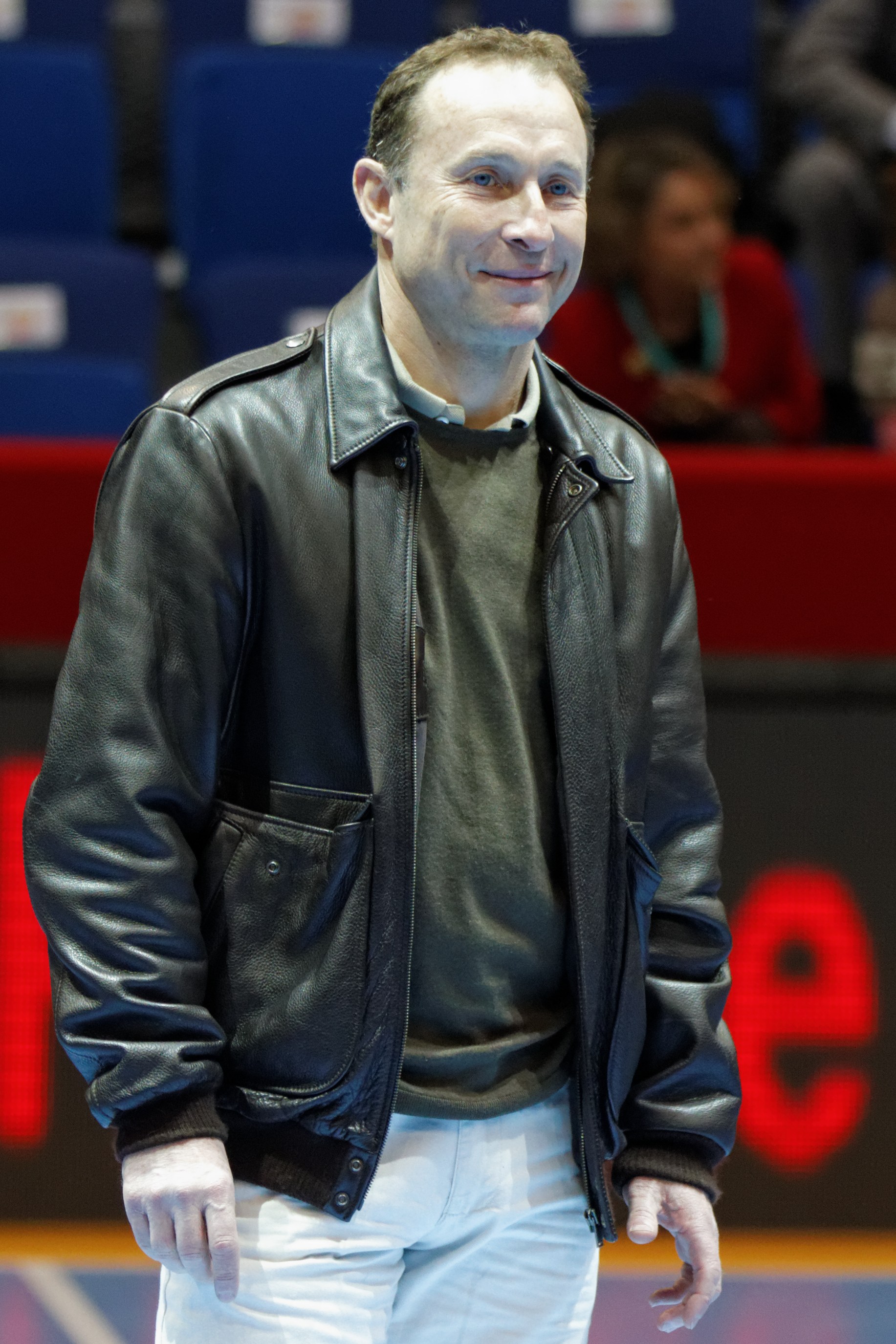
French striker Jean-Pierre Papin was the first ever winner of the award, in 1991.

The IFFHS World's Best International Goal Scorer is a football award given annually since 1991 to the world's top international goalscorer in the calendar year. The award is given by the International Federation of Football History & Statistics (IFFHS).

Only international goals from 1 January to 31 December in international matches, Olympic tournaments, FIFA Club World Cup, official matches between the topical continental club champions, and the continental club competitions of FIFA, AFC, CAF, CONCACAF, CONMEBOL, OFC and UEFA, as well as, the continental Super Cup matches of the six confederations are taken into consideration. If the number of goals is equal, the player who scored more goals in international matches is ranked higher.

Cristiano Ronaldo holds the record for most wins (5), and most goals in a calendar year (32 in 2017). Dennis Bergkamp, Raí and César Obando won the award with the fewest goals (12 in 1992). Neymar and Gabriel Batistuta are the players with the most runner-up appearances (2). Cristiano Ronaldo is the player with most third-place finishes (3). Ali Daei, Cristiano Ronaldo, Lionel Messi, Robert Lewandowski and Romelo Lukaku are the only players who have won the award more than once. Ronaldo and Messi are the only players to win the award in successive seasons, with Ronaldo achieving this twice. Ali Ashfaq scored the most goals without winning (23 goals in 2013). Real Madrid and Barcelona are tied for the clubs with the most wins (5).

In 2012, the IFFHS awarded the World's Best Goal Scorer of the First Decade, considering the years 2001 to 2010.

== Men's winners ==
=== List of winners ===
Year	Rank	Winner	Club(s)	Goals
1991	**1st**	**(France) Jean-Pierre Papin**	**(France) Marseille**	**16**
1991	2nd	(Argentina) Gabriel Batistuta	(Argentina) Boca Juniors (Italy) Fiorentina	12
1991	3rd	(Socialist Federal Republic of Yugoslavia) Darko Pančev	(Socialist Federal Republic of Yugoslavia) Red Star Belgrade	12
1992	**1st**	**(Netherlands) Dennis Bergkamp**	**(Netherlands) Ajax**	**12**
1992	2nd	(Brazil) Raí	(Brazil) São Paulo	12
1992	3rd	(Honduras) César Obando	(Honduras) Motagua	12
1993	**1st**	**(Saudi Arabia) Saeed Al-Owairan**	**(Saudi Arabia) Al Shabab**	**18**
1993	2nd	(Japan) Kazuyoshi Miura	(Japan) Tokyo Verdy	16
1993	3rd	(Mexico) Luís Roberto Alves	(Mexico) América	14
1994	**1st**	**(Bulgaria) Hristo Stoichkov**	**(Spain) Barcelona**	**17**
1994	2nd	(South Korea) Hwang Sun-hong	(South Korea) Pohang Steelers	16
1994	3rd	(Brazil) Romário	(Spain) Barcelona	15
1995	**1st**	**(Germany) Jürgen Klinsmann**	**(England) Tottenham Hotspur** **(Germany) Bayern Munich**	**17**
1995	2nd	(Brazil) Mário Jardel	(Brazil) Grêmio	16
1995	3rd	(Uruguay) Enzo Francescoli	(Argentina) River Plate	14
1996	**1st**	**(Iran) Ali Daei**	**(Iran) Persepolis** **(Qatar) Al Sadd**	**22**
1996	2nd	(Thailand) Natipong Sritong-In (Argentina) Hernán Crespo	(Thailand) Thai Farmers Bank (Argentina) River Plate	16
1996	3rd	–		
1997	**1st**	**(Brazil) Ronaldo**	**(Spain) Barcelona** **(Italy) Inter Milan**	**22**
1997	2nd	(Iran) Karim Bagheri	(Iran) Persepolis (Germany) Arminia Bielefeld	20
1997	3rd	(Brazil) Romário (Japan) Kazuyoshi Miura	(Brazil) Flamengo (Spain) Valencia (Japan) Tokyo Verdy	19
1998	**1st**	**(Kuwait) Jasem Al-Huwaidi**	**(Kuwait) Al-Salmiya**	**20**
1998	2nd	(Argentina) Gabriel Batistuta	(Italy) Fiorentina	14
1998	3rd	(Mexico) Luis Hernández	(Mexico) Necaxa	13
1999	**1st**	**(Spain) Raúl**	**(Spain) Real Madrid**	**14**
1999	2nd	(Brazil) Rivaldo (Brazil) Alex	(Spain) Barcelona (Brazil) Palmeiras	13
1999	3rd	–		
2000	**1st**	**(Brazil) Rivaldo**	**(Spain) Barcelona**	**21 (Note: While Romário finished the year with as many goals as Rivaldo, the latter was crowned winner because of more international club goals.)**
2000	2nd	(Brazil) Romário	(Brazil) Vasco da Gama	21
2000	3rd	(Iran) Ali Daei	(Germany) Hertha BSC	20
2001	**1st**	**(Oman) Hani Al-Dhabit**	**(Oman) Dhofar**	**22**
2001	2nd	(Thailand) Kiatisuk Senamuang (Australia) Archie Thompson (Spain) Raúl	(Singapore) Warriors FC (Australia) Marconi Stallions (Spain) Real Madrid	16
2001	3rd	–		
2002	**1st**	**(Netherlands) Ruud van Nistelrooy**	**(England) Manchester United**	**14**
2002	2nd	(Germany) Miroslav Klose (Denmark) Jon Dahl Tomasson	(Germany) 1. FC Kaiserslautern (Netherlands) Feyenoord (Italy) Milan	13
2002	3rd	–		
2003	**1st**	**(France) Thierry Henry**	**(England) Arsenal**	**15 (Note: While Trezeguet finished the year with as many goals as Henry, the latter was crowned winner because of more international club goals.)**
2003	2nd	(France) David Trezeguet	(Italy) Juventus	15
2003	3rd	(Spain) Raúl	(Spain) Real Madrid	14
2004	**1st**	**(Iran) Ali Daei**	**(Iran) Saba Battery**	**17**
2004	2nd	(Argentina) Carlos Tevez	(Argentina) Boca Juniors	16
2004	3rd	(Brazil) Adriano (Ivory Coast) Didier Drogba	(Italy) Inter Milan (France) Marseille (England) Chelsea	15
2005	**1st**	**(Brazil) Adriano**	**(Italy) Inter Milan**	**18**
2005	2nd	(Honduras) Wilmer Velásquez	(Honduras) Olimpia	15
2005	3rd	(Brazil) Ronaldinho (Egypt) Emad Moteab	(Spain) Barcelona (Egypt) Al Ahly	14
2006	**1st**	**(Chile) Humberto Suazo**	**(Chile) Colo-Colo**	**17**
2006	2nd	(England) Peter Crouch	(England) Liverpool	16
2006	3rd	(Egypt) Mohamed Aboutrika	(Egypt) Al Ahly	14
2007	**1st**	**(Democratic Republic of the Congo) Trésor Mputu**	**(Democratic Republic of the Congo) TP Mazembe**	**20**
2007	2nd	(Paraguay) Salvador Cabañas	(Mexico) América	18
2007	3rd	(Argentina) Juan Román Riquelme	(Argentina) Boca Juniors	17
2008	**1st**	**(Brazil) Rico**	**(Bahrain) Al-Muharraq**	**19**
2008	2nd	(Kuwait) Ahmad Ajab	(Kuwait) Qadsia	15
2008	3rd	(Germany) Miroslav Klose	(Germany) Bayern Munich	15
2009	**1st**	**(Japan) Shinji Okazaki**	**(Japan) Shimizu S-Pulse**	**15 (Note: Since 2009, they awarded the player with the most goals for their national team in case of a tie. That year, Okazaki had scored more goals for his national team than Drogba.)**
2009	2nd	(Ivory Coast) Didier Drogba	(England) Chelsea	15
2009	3rd	(Algeria) Abdelmalek Ziaya	(Algeria) ES Sétif	15
2010	**1st**	**(Kuwait) Bader Al-Mutawa**	**(Kuwait) Qadsia**	**17 (Note: While Eto'o finished the year with as many goals as Al-Mutawa, the latter was crowned winner because of more national team goals.)**
2010	2nd	(Cameroon) Samuel Eto'o	(Italy) Inter Milan	17
2010	3rd	(Spain) David Villa	(Spain) Barcelona	16
2011	**1st**	**(Argentina) Lionel Messi**	**(Spain) Barcelona**	**19**
2011	2nd	(Colombia) Radamel Falcao	(Portugal) Porto (Spain) Atlético Madrid	17
2011	3rd	(Jordan) Hassan Abdel-Fattah (Germany) Mario Gómez	Al-Kuwait (Germany) Bayern Munich	15
2012	**1st**	**(Argentina) Lionel Messi**	**(Spain) Barcelona**	**25**
2012	2nd	(Brazil) Neymar	(Brazil) Santos	21
2012	3rd	(Portugal) Cristiano Ronaldo	(Spain) Real Madrid	18
2013	**1st**	**(Portugal) Cristiano Ronaldo**	**(Spain) Real Madrid**	**25**
2013	2nd	(Maldives) Ali Ashfaq	(Maldives) New Radiant	23
2013	3rd	(Tunisia) Issam Jemâa	Al-Kuwait	20
2014	**1st**	**(Portugal) Cristiano Ronaldo**	**(Spain) Real Madrid**	**20**
2014	2nd	(Brazil) Neymar	(Spain) Barcelona	19
2014	3rd	(Argentina) Lionel Messi	(Spain) Barcelona	18
2015	**1st**	**(Poland) Robert Lewandowski**	**(Germany) Bayern Munich**	**22**
2015	2nd	(United Arab Emirates) Ahmed Khalil	(United Arab Emirates) Shabab Al-Ahli	20
2015	3rd	(Portugal) Cristiano Ronaldo	(Spain) Real Madrid	19
2016	**1st**	**(Portugal) Cristiano Ronaldo**	**(Spain) Real Madrid**	**24**
2016	2nd	(Argentina) Lionel Messi	(Spain) Barcelona	21
2016	3rd	(Uruguay) Edinson Cavani	(France) Paris Saint-Germain	16
2017	**1st**	**(Portugal) Cristiano Ronaldo**	**(Spain) Real Madrid**	**32**
2017	2nd	(North Korea) Kim Yu-song	(North Korea) April 25	16
2017	3rd	(Poland) Robert Lewandowski	(Germany) Bayern Munich	15
2018	**1st**	**(Algeria) Baghdad Bounedjah**	**(Qatar) Al Sadd**	**20**
2018	2nd	(Belgium) Romelu Lukaku	(England) Manchester United	15
2018	3rd	(Morocco) Ayoub El Kaabi	(Morocco) RS Berkane	15
2019	**1st**	**(Portugal) Cristiano Ronaldo**	**(Italy) Juventus**	**21**
2019	2nd	(United Arab Emirates) Ali Mabkhout	(United Arab Emirates) Al Jazira	19
2019	3rd	(England) Harry Kane	(England) Tottenham Hotspur	19
2020	**1st**	**(Belgium) Romelu Lukaku**	**(Italy) Inter Milan**	**16**
2020	2nd	(Norway) Erling Haaland	(Germany) Borussia Dortmund	14
2020	3rd	(Brazil) Neymar	(France) Paris Saint-Germain	11
2021	**1st**	**(Poland) Robert Lewandowski**	**(Germany) Bayern Munich**	**24**
2021	2nd	(England) Harry Kane	(England) Tottenham Hotspur	22
2021	3rd	(Portugal) Cristiano Ronaldo	(Italy) Juventus (England) Manchester United	19
2022	**1st**	**(Argentina) Lionel Messi**	**(France) Paris Saint-Germain**	**22**
2022	2nd	(France) Kylian Mbappé	(France) Paris Saint-Germain	21
2022	3rd	(Argentina) Julián Álvarez	(Argentina) River Plate (England) Manchester City	15
2023	**1st**	**(Belgium) Romelu Lukaku**	**(Italy) Inter Milan** **(Italy) Roma**	**22**
2023	2nd	(Norway) Erling Haaland	(England) Manchester City	18
2023	3rd	(Iran) Mehdi Taremi	(Portugal) Porto	14
2024	**1st**	**(Morocco) Soufiane Rahimi**	**(United Arab Emirates) Al Ain**	**20**
2024	2nd	(Morocco) Ayoub El Kaabi	(Greece) Olympiacos	19
2024	3rd	(Norway) Erling Haaland (Sweden) Viktor Gyökeres	(England) Manchester City (Portugal) Sporting CP	17
2025	**1st**	**(Norway) Erling Haaland**	**(England) Manchester City**	**29**
2025	2nd	(England) Harry Kane	(Germany) Bayern Munich	23
2025	3rd	(France) Kylian Mbappé	(Spain) Real Madrid	22

=== Statistics ===
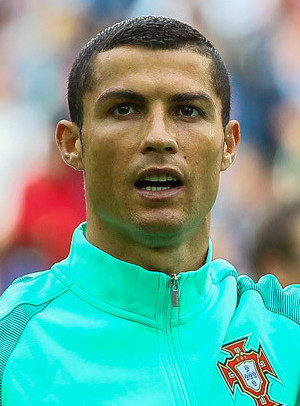
Cristiano Ronaldo is the only player to score 30+ goals in a year.

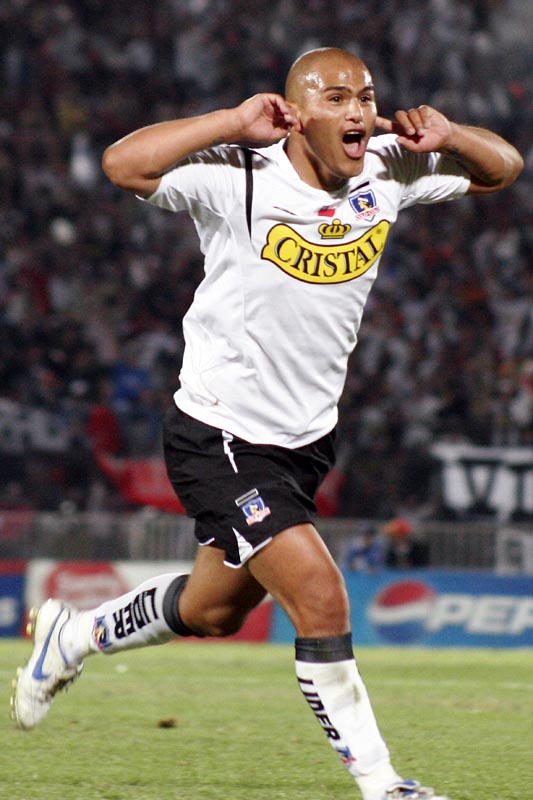
Humberto Suazo is the only Chilean to win the award.

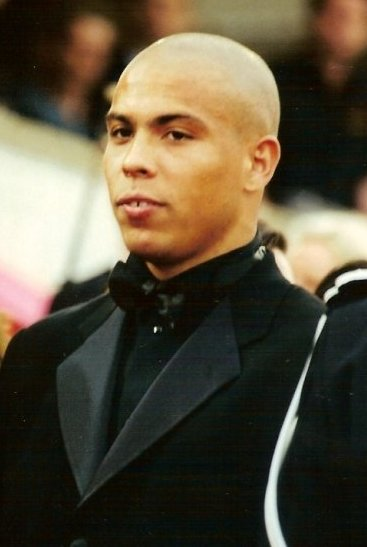
Brazil striker Ronaldo was the first South American to win the award in 1997.

Winners (1991–present)
Player	Wins	Years
(Portugal) Cristiano Ronaldo	5	2013, 2014, 2016, 2017, 2019
(Argentina) Lionel Messi	3	2011, 2012, 2022
(Iran) Ali Daei	2	1996, 2004
(Poland) Robert Lewandowski	2	2015, 2021
(Belgium) Romelu Lukaku	2	2020, 2023
(France) Jean-Pierre Papin	1	1991
(Netherlands) Dennis Bergkamp	1	1992
(Saudi Arabia) Saeed Al-Owairan	1	1993
(Bulgaria) Hristo Stoichkov	1	1994
(Germany) Jürgen Klinsmann	1	1995
(Brazil) Ronaldo	1	1997
(Kuwait) Jasem Al-Huwaidi	1	1998
(Spain) Raúl	1	1999
(Brazil) Rivaldo	1	2000
(Oman) Hani Al-Dhabit	1	2001
(Netherlands) Ruud van Nistelrooy	1	2002
(France) Thierry Henry	1	2003
(Brazil) Adriano	1	2005
(Chile) Humberto Suazo	1	2006
(Democratic Republic of the Congo) Trésor Mputu	1	2007
(Brazil) Rico	1	2008
(Japan) Shinji Okazaki	1	2009
(Kuwait) Bader Al-Mutawa	1	2010
(Algeria) Baghdad Bounedjah	1	2018
(Morocco) Soufiane Rahimi	1	2024
(Norway) Erling Haaland	1	2025

Most international goals in a year
Rank	Player	Year	Goals
1	(Portugal) Cristiano Ronaldo	2017	32
2	(Norway) Erling Haaland	2025	29
3	(Argentina) Lionel Messi	2012	25
3	(Portugal) Cristiano Ronaldo	2013	25
5	(Portugal) Cristiano Ronaldo	2016	24
5	(Poland) Robert Lewandowski	2021	24

Winners by club
Club	Total	Players
(Spain) Real Madrid	5	2
(Spain) Barcelona	4	3
(Italy) Inter Milan	3	3
(Germany) Bayern Munich	3	2
(Qatar) Al Sadd	2	2
(Netherlands) Ajax	1	1
Al-Kuwait	1	1
(Bahrain) Al-Muharraq	1	1
(Saudi Arabia) Al Shabab	1	1
(England) Arsenal	1	1
(Chile) Colo-Colo	1	1
(Oman) Dhofar	1	1
(Italy) Juventus	1	1
(Kuwait) Qadsia	1	1
(England) Manchester United	1	1
(France) Marseille	1	1
(Honduras) Motagua	1	1
(France) Paris Saint-Germain	1	1
(Iran) Saba Battery	1	1
(Brazil) São Paulo	1	1
(Japan) Shimizu S-Pulse	1	1
(England) Tottenham Hotspur	1	1
(Democratic Republic of the Congo) TP Mazembe	1	1
(Italy) AS Roma	1	1
(United Arab Emirates) Al Ain	1	1
(England) Manchester City	1	1

Winners by nationality
Nationality	Total	Players
Brazil	5	5
Portugal	5	1
Argentina	3	1
France	2	2
Kuwait	2	2
Netherlands	2	2
Iran	2	1
Poland	2	1
Belgium	2	1
Algeria	1	1
Bulgaria	1	1
Chile	1	1
DR Congo	1	1
Germany	1	1
Honduras	1	1
Japan	1	1
Oman	1	1
Saudi Arabia	1	1
Morocco	1	1
Norway	1	1

=== The World's Best Top International Goal Scorer of the First Decade (2001–2010) ===
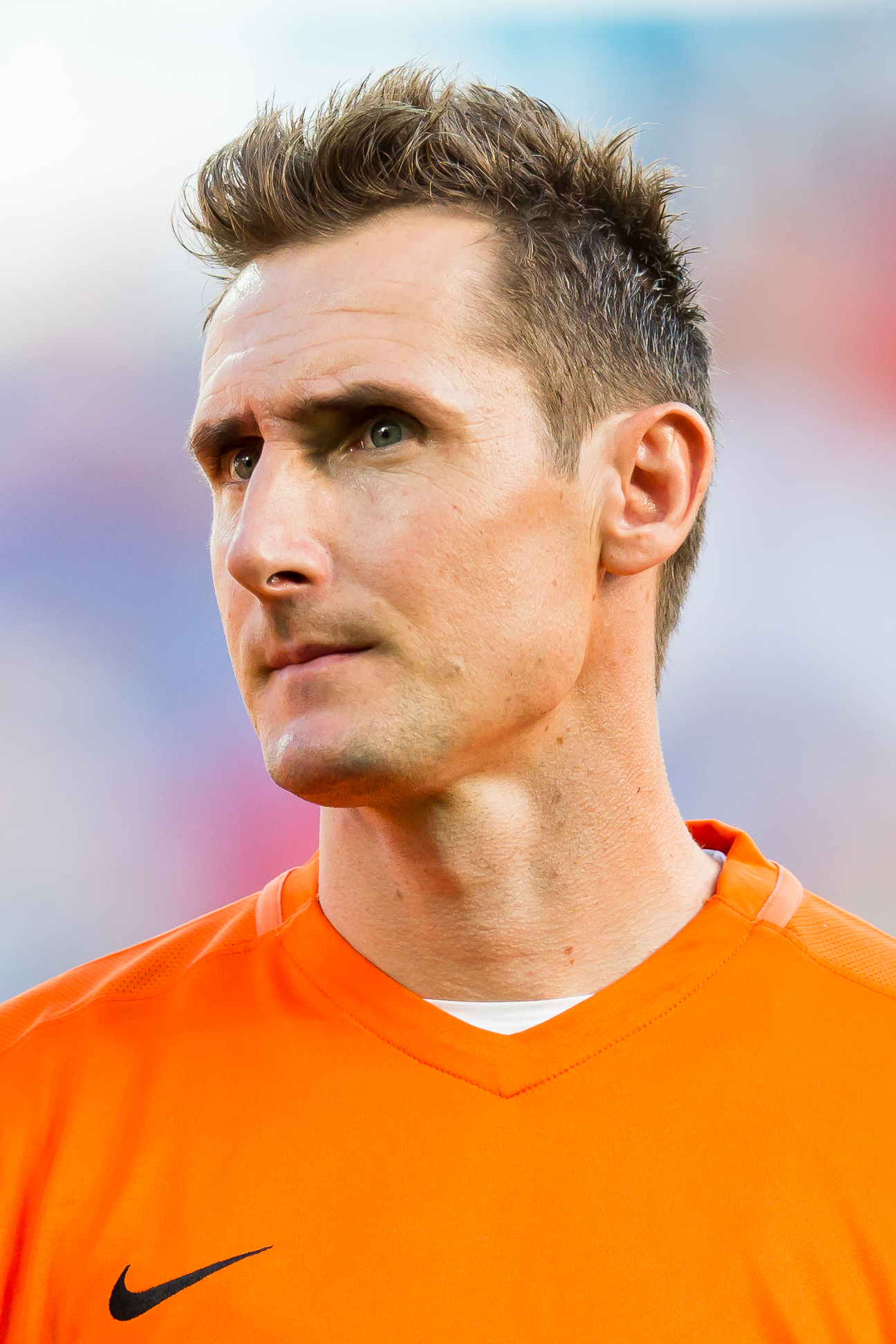
Miroslav Klose scored the most international goals for his country during the decade, with 58.

The awards were part of the IFFHS World Football Gala 2012 which took place in Barcelona in May 2012.

For the final list of 15 players, international goals scored from 1 January 2001 to 31 December 2010 were taken into consideration.

Top 15 goal scorers
Rank	Player	Nation	Club(s)	Goals for country	Goals for club(s)	Total goals
1	Ruud van Nistelrooy	Netherlands	(England) Manchester United (Spain) Real Madrid (Germany) Hamburger SV	33	53	86
2	Thierry Henry	France	(England) Arsenal (Spain) Barcelona	43	42	85
3	Didier Drogba	Ivory Coast	(France) Marseille (England) Chelsea	45	38	83
4	Miroslav Klose	Germany	(Germany) 1. FC Kaiserslautern (Germany) Werder Bremen (Germany) Bayern Munich	58	23	81
5	Samuel Eto'o	Cameroon	(Spain) Mallorca (Spain) Barcelona (Italy) Inter Milan	44	35	79
6	Flávio Amado	Angola	(Angola) Petro Atlético (Egypt) Al Ahly (Saudi Arabia) Al Shabab	32	41	73
7	Dimitar Berbatov	Bulgaria	(Germany) Bayer Leverkusen (England) Tottenham Hotspur (England) Manchester United	46	25	71
8	Raúl	Spain	(Spain) Real Madrid (Germany) Schalke 04	26	45	71
9	David Villa	Spain	(Spain) Zaragoza (Spain) Valencia (Spain) Barcelona	44	24	68
10	Andriy Shevchenko	Ukraine	(Italy) Milan (England) Chelsea (Ukraine) Dynamo Kyiv	32	36	68
11	Alexander Frei	Switzerland	(Switzerland) Servette (France) Rennes (Switzerland) Basel	42	21	63
12	Henrik Larsson	Sweden	(Scotland) Celtic (Spain) Barcelona (England) Manchester United (Sweden) Helsingborgs IF	25	36	61
13	Jon Dahl Tomasson	Denmark	(Netherlands) Feyenoord (Italy) Milan (Germany) VfB Stuttgart (Spain) Villarreal	43	16	59
14	Jared Borgetti	Mexico	(Mexico) Santos Laguna (Mexico) Pachuca (England) Bolton Wanderers (Saudi Arabia) Al-Ittihad (Mexico) Morelia	41	17	58
15	Adriano	Brazil	(Italy) Parma (Italy) Inter Milan (Brazil) São Paulo (Brazil) Flamengo	27	31	58

=== All-time Best International Goal Scorer ranking ===
As of 14 October 2026
Bold indicates players currently active.
* indicates player has scored at least 100 international goals for a single club.

Players with at least 100 international goals
Rank	Player	CL	CWC	CC2	OCs	SC	WC	OICs	Country	Total	Years
1	(Portugal) **Cristiano Ronaldo***	156	0	3	6	2	7	0	146	320	2002–present
2	(Argentina) **Lionel Messi***	137	0	0	14	3	6	0	126	286	2004–present
3	**(Poland) Robert Lewandowski**	109	0	8	1	0	2	0	92	212	2008–present
4	**(England) Harry Kane**	57	0	18	6	0	3	0	91	175	2011–present
5	**(Belgium) Romelu Lukaku**	21	0	27	0	1	2	0	94	145	2009–present
6	**(Brazil) Neymar**	58	0	2	0	1	1	0	80	142	2009–present
7	**(France) Karim Benzema**	94	0	0	3	2	6	0	37	142	2009–present
8	**(France) Kylian Mbappé**	72	0	0	0	1	2	0	67	142	2015–present
9	**(Bosnia and Herzegovina) Edin Džeko**	33	0	28	6	0	0	0	73	140	2003–present
10	(Germany) Gerd Müller	34	20	4	7	3	1	0	68	137	1964–1981
11	**(Uruguay) Luis Suárez**	36	0	16	5	1	6	0	69	133	2005–present
12	**(Norway) Erling Haaland**	61	0	4	0	0	3	0	65	133	2018–present
13	**(Egypt) Mohamed Salah**	54	0	10	0	0	0	0	68	132	2009–present
14	(Hungary) Ferenc Puskás	36	0	0	3	0	2	0	84	125	1943–1966
15	(Spain) Raúl	71	0	4	0	1	3	0	44	123	1994–2015
16	(Iran) Ali Daei	11	0	2	0	0	0	0	108	121	1994–2007
17	(Sweden) Zlatan Ibrahimović	49	0	8	0	0	0	0	62	119	1999–2023
18	**(Uruguay) Edinson Cavani**	36	0	25	0	0	0	0	58	119	2005–present
19	(Ivory Coast) Didier Drogba	45	0	6	0	0	0	0	65	116	2002–2016
20	(Ukraine) Andriy Shevchenko	59	0	7	0	1	0	0	48	115	1992–2012
21	**(India) Sunil Chhetri**	15	0	5	0	0	0	0	95	115	2002–present
22	(Egypt) Hossam Hassan	17	10	4	10	0	0	2	69	112	1984–2008
23	(Brazil) Ronaldo	21	5	15	8	0	1	0	62	112	1993–2011
24	(France) Thierry Henry	51	0	8	0	0	0	0	51	110	1994–2012
25	**(United Arab Emirates) Ali Mabkhout**	16	0	0	6	0	1	0	85	108	2008–present
26	(Brazil) Romário	24	0	0	24	0	4	0	55	107	1985–2007
27	(Cameroon) Samuel Eto'o	33	0	15	0	0	1	0	56	105	1999–2019
28	(Argentina) Sergio Agüero	47	0	15	0	1	0	0	41	104	2003–2021
29	**(France) Olivier Giroud**	25	0	20	1	1	0	0	57	104	2010–present
30	(Brazil) Pelé	18	0	0	0	0	7	1	77	103	1957–1977
31	(Hungary) Sándor Kocsis	8	3	0	17	0	0	0	75	103	1945–1965
32	(Germany) Miroslav Klose	15	0	16	0	0	0	0	71	102	1999–2016
33	**(Germany) Thomas Müller**	57	0	0	0	0	0	0	45	102	2008–present
34	(Portugal) Eusébio	46	7	0	4	0	2	0	41	100	1957–1978
35	**(Kuwait) Bader Al-Mutawa**	12	0	31	++	0	0	0	56	99+	2003–present

== Women's winners ==
IFFHS World's Best Woman International Goal Scorer
- Sport: Association football
- Awarded for: Best international goal scorer of the calendar year
- Presented by: International Federation of Football History & Statistics

History
- First award: 2021
- Editions: 5
- First winner: (England) Ellen White
- Most wins: (Australia) Sam Kerr (England) Ellen White (Zambia) Barbra Banda (Germany) Lea Schüller (Spain) Claudia Pina (1 award each)
- Most recent: (Spain) Claudia Pina (1st award)
- Website: iffhs.com/en

=== List of winners ===
Year	Rank	Winner	Club(s)	Goals
2021	1st	(England) Ellen White	(England) Manchester City	21
2021	2nd	(Netherlands) Vivianne Miedema	(England) Arsenal	17
2021	3rd	(Germany) Lea Schüller	(Germany) Bayern Munich	17
2022	1st	(Australia) Sam Kerr	(England) Chelsea	17
2022	2nd	(England) Beth Mead	(England) Arsenal	15
2022	3rd	(Poland) Ewa Pajor	(Germany) VfL Wolfsburg	15
2023	1st	(Zambia) Barbra Banda	(China) Shanghai Shengli	15
2023	2nd	(Spain) Salma Paralluelo	(Spain) Barcelona	14
2023	3rd	(Australia) Sam Kerr	(England) Chelsea	13
2024	1st	(Germany) Lea Schüller	(Germany) Bayern Munich	14
2024	2nd	(France) Marie-Antoinette Katoto	(France) Paris Saint-Germain	13
2024	3rd	(Spain) Aitana Bonmatí	(Spain) Barcelona	13
2025	1st	(Spain) Claudia Pina	(Spain) Barcelona	18
2025	2nd	(England) Alessia Russo	(England) Arsenal	14
2025	3rd	(Spain) Alexia Putellas	(Spain) Barcelona	13

=== Statistics ===
Winners (2021–present)
Player	Wins	Years
(England) Ellen White	1	2021
(Australia) Sam Kerr	1	2022
(Zambia) Barbra Banda	1	2023
(Germany) Lea Schüller	1	2024
(Spain) Claudia Pina	1	2025

Most goals in a year
Rank	Player	Year	Goals
1	(England) Ellen White	2021	21
2	(Spain) Claudia Pina	2025	18
3	(Australia) Sam Kerr	2022	17
3	(Netherlands) Vivianne Miedema	2021	17
3	(Germany) Lea Schüller	2021	17
6	(England) Beth Mead	2022	15
6	(Poland) Ewa Pajor	2022	15
6	(Zambia) Barbra Banda	2022	15
9	(Spain) Salma Paralluelo	2023	14
9	(Germany) Lea Schüller	2024	14
9	(England) Alessia Russo	2025	14

Wins by club
Club	Total	Players
(England) Chelsea	1	1
(England) Manchester City	1	1
(China) Shanghai Shengli	1	1
(Germany) Bayern Munich	1	1
(Spain) Barcelona	1	1

Wins by nationality
Nationality	Total	Players
Australia	1	1
England	1	1
Zambia	1	1
Germany	1	1
Spain	1	1

== See also ==
- International Federation of Football History & Statistics
- IFFHS World's Best Top Goal Scorer
- IFFHS World's Best National Coach
- IFFHS World's Best Club Coach
- IFFHS World's Best Goalkeeper
- IFFHS World's Best Player
- IFFHS World's Best Club
- IFFHS World Team
