= List of international goals scored by Thierry Henry =

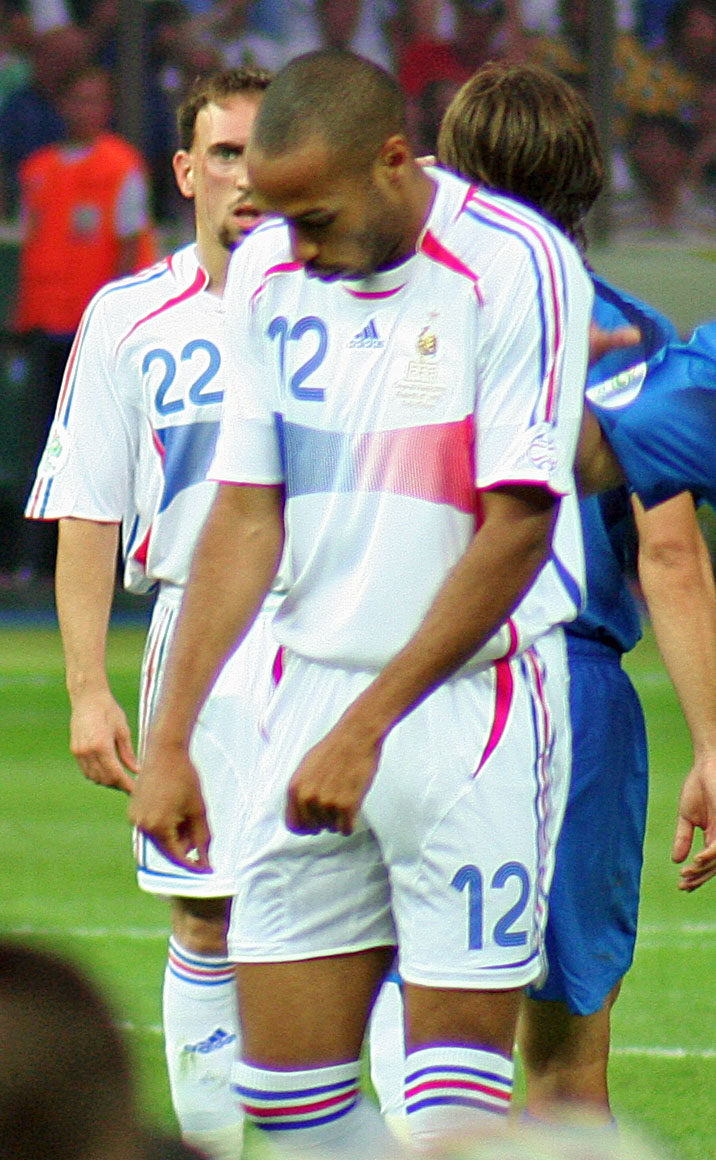
Henry with France against Italy at the 2006 FIFA World Cup final. He has scored 51 goals for France in 123 appearances.

Thierry Henry is a French former professional footballer, who held the record for the most goals scored for the France national team until being surpassed by Olivier Giroud in 2022. During his international career he played 123 games for France in which he scored 51 goals. Henry made his international debut against South Africa in a 2–1 victory in October 1997. His first international goal came in the 1998 FIFA World Cup against South Africa. He surpassed the previous all-time French goal-scoring record, held by Michel Platini, in October 2007 when he scored twice against Lithuania, taking his tally to 43. Henry retired from international football in July 2010 after a 13-year career, making his final appearance as a substitute, against South Africa, in France's disastrous (lowest ever Finals placement) 2010 FIFA World Cup campaign. Henry scored his 51st and final goal for France against Austria the preceding October.

Henry never scored an international hat-trick, although he did score twice in a match on seven occasions. He scored more times against Malta than any other team, with four goals, scored in back-to-back qualifiers for UEFA Euro 2004. More than half of Henry's goals came in home matches, 31 of his 51 goals being scored in France, including 20 at the Stade de France.

16 of Henry's goals came in friendlies. A tally of four goals in the 2003 FIFA Confederations Cup made Henry the tournament's top scorer and led to his being voted the "tournament's most outstanding player". He scored twelve goals in UEFA European Championship qualifiers, including six in the qualification phase of UEFA Euro 2004, where he finished as third-equal top scorer, behind Slovenia's Ermin Šiljak and Spain's Raúl.

== List of international goals ==
Scores and results list France's goal tally first. Score column indicates score after each Henry goal.

List of international goals scored by Thierry Henry
No.	Date	Venue	Cap	Opponent	Score	Result	Competition	Ref.
1	12 June 1998	Stade Vélodrome, Marseille, France	4	South Africa	3–0	3–0	1998 FIFA World Cup	
2	18 June 1998	Stade de France, Saint-Denis, France	5	Saudi Arabia	1–0	4–0	1998 FIFA World Cup	
3	18 June 1998	Stade de France, Saint-Denis, France	5	Saudi Arabia	3–0	4–0	1998 FIFA World Cup	
4	29 March 2000	Hampden Park, Glasgow, Scotland	12	Scotland	1–0	2–0	Friendly	
5	6 June 2000	Stade Mohammed V, Casablanca, Morocco	16	Morocco	1–0	5–1	Friendly	
6	11 June 2000	Jan Breydel Stadium, Bruges, Belgium	17	Denmark	2–0	3–0	UEFA Euro 2000	
7	16 June 2000	Jan Breydel Stadium, Bruges, Belgium	18	Czech Republic	1–0	2–1	UEFA Euro 2000	
8	28 June 2000	King Baudouin Stadium, Brussels, Belgium	20	Portugal	1–1	2–1	UEFA Euro 2000	
9	24 March 2001	Stade de France, Saint-Denis, France	27	Japan	2–0	5–0	Friendly	
10	25 April 2001	Stade de France, Saint-Denis, France	29	Portugal	3–0	4–0	Friendly	
11	6 October 2001	Stade de France, Saint-Denis, France	32	Algeria	3–0	4–1	Friendly	
12	27 March 2002	Stade de France, Saint-Denis, France	34	Scotland	3–0	5–0	Friendly	
13	16 October 2002	National Stadium, Ta' Qali, Malta	41	Malta	1–0	4–0	UEFA Euro 2004 qualification	
14	16 October 2002	National Stadium, Ta' Qali, Malta	41	Malta	2–0	4–0	UEFA Euro 2004 qualification	
15	29 March 2003	Stade Félix-Bollaert, Lens, France	44	Malta	2–0	6–0	UEFA Euro 2004 qualification	
16	29 March 2003	Stade Félix-Bollaert, Lens, France	44	Malta	3–0	6–0	UEFA Euro 2004 qualification	
17	30 April 2003	Stade de France, Saint-Denis, France	46	Egypt	1–0	5–0	Friendly	
18	30 April 2003	Stade de France, Saint-Denis, France	46	Egypt	2–0	5–0	Friendly	
19	18 June 2003	Stade de Gerland, Lyon, France	47	Colombia	1–0	1–0	2003 FIFA Confederations Cup	
20	22 June 2003	Stade de France, Saint-Denis, France	49	New Zealand	2–0	5–0	2003 FIFA Confederations Cup	
21	26 June 2003	Stade de France, Saint-Denis, France	50	Turkey	1–0	3–2	2003 FIFA Confederations Cup	
22	29 June 2003	Stade de France, Saint-Denis, France	51	Cameroon	1–0	1–0	2003 FIFA Confederations Cup	
23	6 September 2003	Stade de France, Saint-Denis, France	53	Cyprus	4–0	5–0	UEFA Euro 2004 qualification	
24	11 October 2003	Stade de France, Saint-Denis, France	55	Israel	1–0	3–0	UEFA Euro 2004 qualification	
25	15 November 2003	Arena AufSchalke, Gelsenkirchen, Germany	56	Germany	1–0	3–0	Friendly	
26	21 June 2004	Estádio Cidade de Coimbra, Coimbra, Portugal	62	Switzerland	2–1	3–1	UEFA Euro 2004	
27	21 June 2004	Estádio Cidade de Coimbra, Coimbra, Portugal	62	Switzerland	3–1	3–1	UEFA Euro 2004	
28	13 October 2004	GSP Stadium, Nicosia, Cyprus	68	Cyprus	2–0	2–0	2006 FIFA World Cup qualification	
29	17 August 2005	Stade de la Mosson, Montpellier, France	71	Ivory Coast	3–0	3–0	Friendly	
30	7 September 2005	Lansdowne Road, Dublin, Ireland	73	Republic of Ireland	1–0	1–0	2006 FIFA World Cup qualification	
31	9 November 2005	Stade d'Honneur de Dillon, Fort-de-France, France	74	Costa Rica	3–2	3–2	Friendly	
32	31 May 2006	Stade Félix-Bollaert, Lens, France	77	Denmark	1–0	2–0	Friendly	
33	7 June 2006	Stade Geoffroy-Guichard, Saint-Étienne, France	78	China	3–1	3–1	Friendly	
34	18 June 2006	Zentralstadion, Leipzig, Germany	80	South Korea	1–0	1–1	2006 FIFA World Cup	
35	23 June 2006	Müngersdorfer Stadion, Cologne, Germany	81	Togo	2–0	2–0	2006 FIFA World Cup	
36	1 July 2006	Waldstadion, Frankfurt, Germany	83	Brazil	1–0	1–0	2006 FIFA World Cup	
37	6 September 2006	Stade de France, Saint-Denis, France	88	Italy	2–0	3–1	UEFA Euro 2008 qualification	
38	11 October 2006	Stade Auguste Bonal, Montbéliard, France	90	Faroe Islands	2–0	5–0	UEFA Euro 2008 qualification	
39	15 November 2006	Stade de France, Saint-Denis, France	91	Greece	1–0	1–0	Friendly	
40	22 August 2007	Štadión Antona Malatinského, Trnava, Slovakia	93	Slovakia	1–0	1–0	Friendly	
41	13 October 2007	Tórsvøllur, Tórshavn, Faroe Islands	95	Faroe Islands	2–0	6–0	UEFA Euro 2008 qualification	
42	17 October 2007	Stade de la Beaujoire, Nantes, France	96	Lithuania	1–0	2–0	UEFA Euro 2008 qualification	
43	17 October 2007	Stade de la Beaujoire, Nantes, France	96	Lithuania	2–0	2–0	UEFA Euro 2008 qualification	
44	21 November 2007	Olimpiyskiy National Sports Complex, Kyiv, Ukraine	97	Ukraine	1–1	2–2	UEFA Euro 2008 qualification	
45	13 June 2008	Stade de Suisse, Bern, Switzerland	101	Netherlands	1–2	1–4	UEFA Euro 2008	
46	10 September 2008	Stade de France, Saint-Denis, France	105	Serbia	1–0	2–1	2010 FIFA World Cup qualification	
47	14 October 2008	Stade de France, Saint-Denis, France	107	Tunisia	1–1	3–1	Friendly	
48	14 October 2008	Stade de France, Saint-Denis, France	107	Tunisia	2–1	3–1	Friendly	
49	5 September 2009	Stade de France, Saint-Denis, France	112	Romania	1–0	1–1	2010 FIFA World Cup qualification	
50	9 September 2009	Stadion FK Crvena Zvezda, Belgrade, Serbia	113	Serbia	1–1	1–1	2010 FIFA World Cup qualification	
51	14 October 2009	Stade de France, Saint-Denis, France	115	Austria	2–0	3–1	2010 FIFA World Cup qualification	

== Statistics ==
Goals by year
Year	Apps	Goals
1997	1	0
1998	10	3
1999	0	0
2000	14	5
2001	7	3
2002	10	3
2003	14	11
2004	13	3
2005	6	3
2006	16	8
2007	6	5
2008	11	4
2009	9	3
2010	6	0
Total	123	51

Goals by competition
Competition	Goals
UEFA European Championship qualification	12
Friendlies (Note: Henry's 2000 statistics includes one appearance from the match against FIFA XI on 16 August 2000 which FIFA and the French Football Federation count as an official friendly match.)	17
UEFA European Championship tournaments	6
FIFA World Cup qualification	6
FIFA World Cup tournaments	6
FIFA Confederations Cup	4
Total	51

Goals by opponent
Opponent	Goals
Malta	4
Cyprus	2
Denmark	2
Egypt	2
Faroe Islands	2
Lithuania	2
Portugal	2
Saudi Arabia	2
Scotland	2
Serbia	2
Switzerland	2
Tunisia	2
Algeria	1
Austria	1
Brazil	1
Cameroon	1
China	1
Colombia	1
Costa Rica	1
Czech Republic	1
Greece	1
Italy	1
Ivory Coast	1
Japan	1
Morocco	1
Netherlands	1
New Zealand	1
Republic of Ireland	1
Romania	1
Slovakia	1
South Africa	1
South Korea	1
Togo	1
Turkey	1
Ukraine	1
Total	51

== See also ==
- List of leading goalscorers for the France national football team
- List of top international men's football goal scorers by country
- List of men's footballers with 50 or more international goals
- List of international goals scored by Zinedine Zidane
- List of international goals scored by Kylian Mbappé
- List of international goals scored by Olivier Giroud
- List of footballers with 100 or more caps
