= List of international goals scored by Kylian Mbappé =

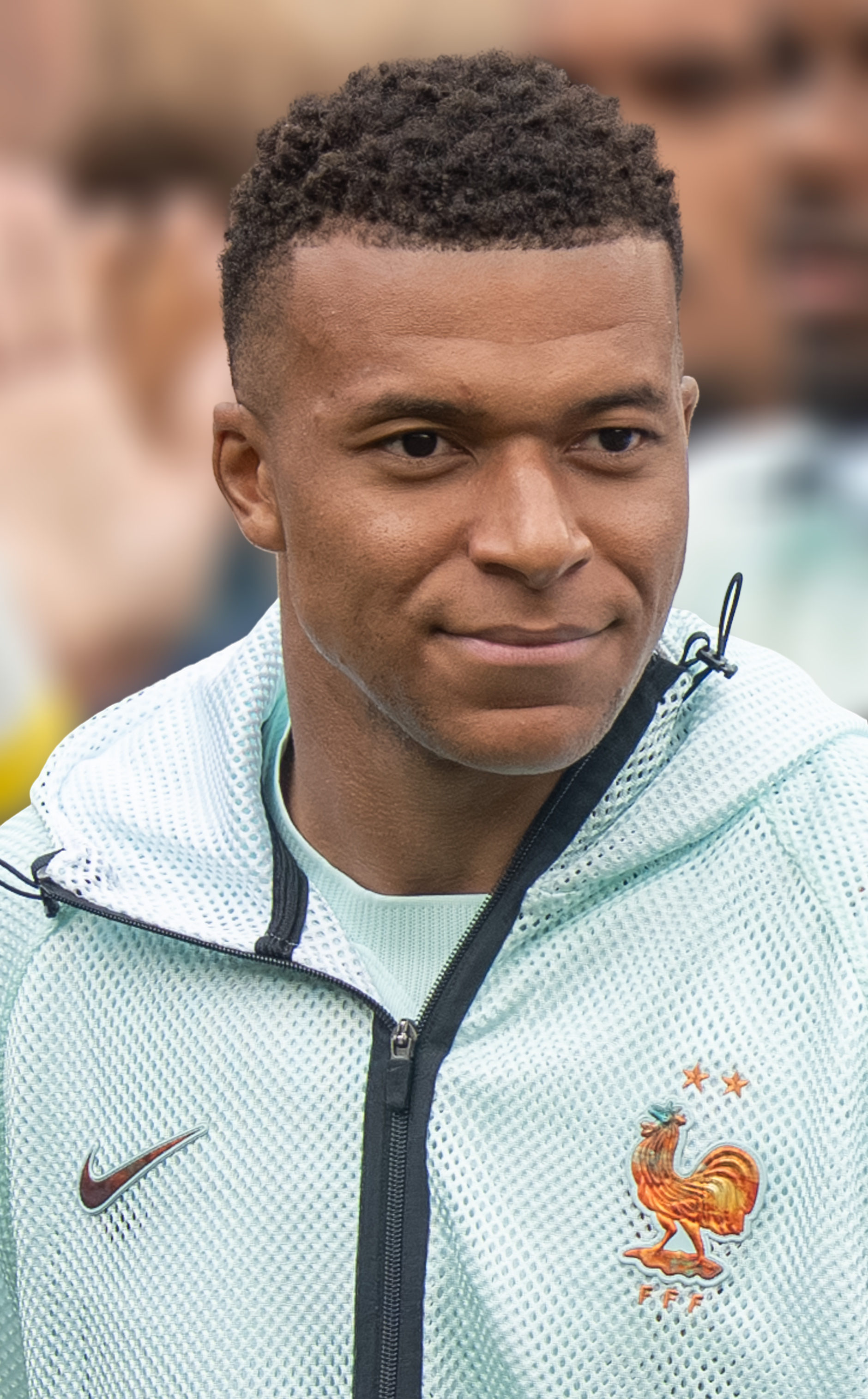
Mbappé (pictured in 2026) has scored 67 international goals since making his debut for France in 2017.

Kylian Mbappé is a French professional footballer who has represented the France national team as a forward since his debut in 2017. Over the course of 108 appearances, he has scored 67 goals, making him the country's current all-time record goalscorer. In addition to the scoring record, Mbappé holds the distinction of being the first player to register over 100 goal involvements (goals and assists) for the French men's national team.

Mbappé made his debut appearance for France on 25 March 2017, during a 2018 World Cup qualifying match against Luxembourg; at just 18 years and 89 days old, he was the youngest player to represent Les Bleus since Maryan Wisniewski in 1955. On 31 August 2017, he scored his first international goal in a 4–0 win against the Netherlands.

Mbappé scored four goals at the 2018 FIFA World Cup, his debut international tournament, including one in the final against Croatia, as France won their second world title. Mbappé also became the first teenager to score in a World Cup final since Pelé in 1958. He was the top scorer at the 2022 World Cup with eight goals, including a hat-trick in the final against Argentina, the first hat-trick in a World Cup final since Geoff Hurst in 1966. It also made him the fifth player to score in two finals (Note: The others are Vavá (1958 and 1962), Pelé (1958 and 1970), Paul Breitner (1974 and 1982) and Zinedine Zidane (1998 and 2006).) and only the second to score in consecutive finals, after Brazilian striker Vavá did so in 1958 and 1962. Mbappé scored ten goals at the 2026 World Cup, becoming the first player to reach double figures in a single edition of the competition since Gerd Müller in 1970, as well as the first player ever to win the World Cup Golden Boot twice.

Mbappé has scored two other hat-tricks: four goals against Kazakhstan in November 2021, and three goals against Gibraltar in November 2023, with the latter hat-trick coming in a record-breaking 14–0 victory. Out of all his opponents, he has scored the most against the Netherlands, with six goals against the side. Mbappé has scored a record 22 goals in the FIFA World Cup, one in the UEFA European Championship, ten in the UEFA Nations League, eleven in FIFA World Cup qualification and twelve in UEFA European Championship qualification. The remainder of his goals, eleven, have come in friendlies. His most productive calendar years in terms of international goals were 2022 and 2026, scoring twelve times for France in both instances.

Mbappé scored his 50th international goal on 8 June 2025 in a UEFA Nations League win against Germany, becoming the third Frenchman to hit the landmark after Thierry Henry and Olivier Giroud, and the fourth-youngest European overall to do so. His next goal, a penalty in a World Cup qualifier against Ukraine on 5 September 2025, saw him draw level with Henry as France's second-highest scorer. Four days later, he surpassed Henry into second place when he scored against Iceland. On 16 June 2026, Mbappé scored a brace against Senegal in France's World Cup opening match, reaching 58 international goals and overtaking Giroud as the nation's all-time top scorer. Six days later, he scored another brace against Iraq in France's second World Cup game to match the 16 goal-tally of Germany's Miroslav Klose in the competition. Mbappé's two goals against England on 18 July brought his overall tally in the competition to 22 across three editions, seeing him overtake Lionel Messi as the all-time World Cup leading scorer.

== Goals ==
Table key
| ‡ | Indicates goal was scored from a penalty kick |
| | Indicates France won the match |
| | Indicates the match ended in a draw |
| | Indicates France lost the match |

As of match played 25 September 2026
France score listed first, score column indicates score after each Mbappé goal

International goals by date, venue, cap, opponent, score, result and competition
| No. | Date | Venue | Cap | Opponent | Score | Result | Competition | Ref. |
|---|---|---|---|---|---|---|---|---|
| 1 | 31 August 2017 | Stade de France, Saint-Denis, France | 5 | Netherlands | 4–0 | 4–0 | 2018 FIFA World Cup qualification | |
| 2 | 27 March 2018 | Krestovsky Stadium, Saint Petersburg, Russia | 12 | Russia | 1–0 | 3–1 | Friendly | |
| 3 | 27 March 2018 | Krestovsky Stadium, Saint Petersburg, Russia | 12 | Russia | 3–1 | 3–1 | Friendly | |
| 4 | 9 June 2018 | Parc Olympique Lyonnais, Décines-Charpieu, France | 15 | United States | 1–1 | 1–1 | Friendly | |
| 5 | 21 June 2018 | Ekaterinburg Arena, Yekaterinburg, Russia | 17 | Peru | 1–0 | 1–0 | 2018 FIFA World Cup | |
| 6 | 30 June 2018 | Kazan Arena, Kazan, Russia | 19 | Argentina | 3–2 | 4–3 | 2018 FIFA World Cup | |
| 7 | 30 June 2018 | Kazan Arena, Kazan, Russia | 19 | Argentina | 4–2 | 4–3 | 2018 FIFA World Cup | |
| 8 | 15 July 2018 | Luzhniki Stadium, Moscow, Russia | 22 | Croatia | 4–1 | 4–2 | 2018 FIFA World Cup | |
| 9 | 9 September 2018 | Stade de France, Saint-Denis, France | 24 | Netherlands | 1–0 | 2–1 | 2018–19 UEFA Nations League A | |
| 10 | 11 October 2018 | Stade de Roudourou, Guingamp, France | 25 | Iceland | 2–2‡ | 2–2 | Friendly | |
| 11 | 22 March 2019 | Zimbru Stadium, Chișinău, Moldova | 29 | Moldova | 4–0 | 4–1 | UEFA Euro 2020 qualifying | |
| 12 | 25 March 2019 | Stade de France, Saint-Denis, France | 30 | Iceland | 3–0 | 4–0 | UEFA Euro 2020 qualifying | |
| 13 | 11 June 2019 | Estadi Nacional, Andorra la Vella, Andorra | 33 | Andorra | 1–0 | 4–0 | UEFA Euro 2020 qualifying | |
| 14 | 5 September 2020 | Friends Arena, Solna, Sweden | 35 | Sweden | 1–0 | 1–0 | 2020–21 UEFA Nations League A | |
| 15 | 7 October 2020 | Stade de France, Saint-Denis, France | 36 | Ukraine | 6–1 | 7–1 | Friendly | |
| 16 | 14 October 2020 | Stadion Maksimir, Zagreb, Croatia | 38 | Croatia | 2–1 | 2–1 | 2020–21 UEFA Nations League A | |
| 17 | 2 June 2021 | Allianz Riviera, Nice, France | 43 | Wales | 1–0 | 3–0 | Friendly | |
| 18 | 7 October 2021 | Juventus Stadium, Turin, Italy | 50 | Belgium | 2–2‡ | 3–2 | 2021 UEFA Nations League Finals | |
| 19 | 10 October 2021 | San Siro, Milan, Italy | 51 | Spain | 2–1 | 2–1 | 2021 UEFA Nations League Finals | |
| 20 | 13 November 2021 | Parc des Princes, Paris, France | 52 | Kazakhstan | 1–0 | 8–0 | 2022 FIFA World Cup qualification | |
| 21 | 13 November 2021 | Parc des Princes, Paris, France | 52 | Kazakhstan | 2–0 | 8–0 | 2022 FIFA World Cup qualification | |
| 22 | 13 November 2021 | Parc des Princes, Paris, France | 52 | Kazakhstan | 3–0 | 8–0 | 2022 FIFA World Cup qualification | |
| 23 | 13 November 2021 | Parc des Princes, Paris, France | 52 | Kazakhstan | 8–0 | 8–0 | 2022 FIFA World Cup qualification | |
| 24 | 16 November 2021 | Helsinki Olympic Stadium, Helsinki, Finland | 53 | Finland | 2–0 | 2–0 | 2022 FIFA World Cup qualification | |
| 25 | 29 March 2022 | Stade Pierre-Mauroy, Villeneuve-d'Ascq, France | 54 | South Africa | 1–0 | 5–0 | Friendly | |
| 26 | 29 March 2022 | Stade Pierre-Mauroy, Villeneuve-d'Ascq, France | 54 | South Africa | 3–0‡ | 5–0 | Friendly | |
| 27 | 10 June 2022 | Ernst-Happel-Stadion, Vienna, Austria | 56 | Austria | 1–1 | 1–1 | 2022–23 UEFA Nations League A | |
| 28 | 22 September 2022 | Stade de France, Saint-Denis, France | 58 | Austria | 1–0 | 2–0 | 2022–23 UEFA Nations League A | |
| 29 | 22 November 2022 | Al Janoub Stadium, Al Wakrah, Qatar | 60 | Australia | 3–1 | 4–1 | 2022 FIFA World Cup | |
| 30 | 26 November 2022 | Stadium 974, Doha, Qatar | 61 | Denmark | 1–0 | 2–1 | 2022 FIFA World Cup | |
| 31 | 26 November 2022 | Stadium 974, Doha, Qatar | 61 | Denmark | 2–1 | 2–1 | 2022 FIFA World Cup | |
| 32 | 4 December 2022 | Al Thumama Stadium, Doha, Qatar | 63 | Poland | 2–0 | 3–1 | 2022 FIFA World Cup | |
| 33 | 4 December 2022 | Al Thumama Stadium, Doha, Qatar | 63 | Poland | 3–0 | 3–1 | 2022 FIFA World Cup | |
| 34 | 18 December 2022 | Lusail Stadium, Lusail, Qatar | 66 | Argentina | 1–2‡ | 3–3 (a.e.t.) (2–4 p) | 2022 FIFA World Cup | |
| 35 | 18 December 2022 | Lusail Stadium, Lusail, Qatar | 66 | Argentina | 2–2 | 3–3 (a.e.t.) (2–4 p) | 2022 FIFA World Cup | |
| 36 | 18 December 2022 | Lusail Stadium, Lusail, Qatar | 66 | Argentina | 3–3‡ | 3–3 (a.e.t.) (2–4 p) | 2022 FIFA World Cup | |
| 37 | 24 March 2023 | Stade de France, Saint-Denis, France | 67 | Netherlands | 3–0 | 4–0 | UEFA Euro 2024 qualifying | |
| 38 | 24 March 2023 | Stade de France, Saint-Denis, France | 67 | Netherlands | 4–0 | 4–0 | UEFA Euro 2024 qualifying | |
| 39 | 16 June 2023 | Estádio Algarve, Almancil, Portugal | 69 | Gibraltar | 2–0 | 3–0 | UEFA Euro 2024 qualifying | |
| 40 | 19 June 2023 | Stade de France, Saint-Denis, France | 70 | Greece | 1–0‡ | 1–0 | UEFA Euro 2024 qualifying | |
| 41 | 13 October 2023 | Johan Cruyff Arena, Amsterdam, Netherlands | 72 | Netherlands | 1–0 | 2–1 | UEFA Euro 2024 qualifying | |
| 42 | 13 October 2023 | Johan Cruyff Arena, Amsterdam, Netherlands | 72 | Netherlands | 2–0 | 2–1 | UEFA Euro 2024 qualifying | |
| 43 | 17 October 2023 | Stade Pierre-Mauroy, Villeneuve-d'Ascq, France | 73 | Scotland | 3–1‡ | 4–1 | Friendly | |
| 44 | 18 November 2023 | Allianz Riviera, Nice, France | 74 | Gibraltar | 4–0‡ | 14–0 | UEFA Euro 2024 qualifying | |
| 45 | 18 November 2023 | Allianz Riviera, Nice, France | 74 | Gibraltar | 11–0 | 14–0 | UEFA Euro 2024 qualifying | |
| 46 | 18 November 2023 | Allianz Riviera, Nice, France | 74 | Gibraltar | 12–0 | 14–0 | UEFA Euro 2024 qualifying | |
| 47 | 5 June 2024 | Stade Saint-Symphorien, Longeville-lès-Metz, France | 78 | Luxembourg | 3–0 | 3–0 | Friendly | |
| 48 | 25 June 2024 | Westfalenstadion, Dortmund, Germany | 81 | Poland | 1–0‡ | 1–1 | UEFA Euro 2024 | |
| 49 | 5 June 2025 | MHPArena, Stuttgart, Germany | 89 | Spain | 1–4‡ | 4–5 | 2025 UEFA Nations League Finals | |
| 50 | 8 June 2025 | MHPArena, Stuttgart, Germany | 90 | Germany | 1–0 | 2–0 | 2025 UEFA Nations League Finals | |
| 51 | 5 September 2025 | Wrocław Stadium, Wrocław, Poland | 91 | Ukraine | 2–0 | 2–0 | 2026 FIFA World Cup qualification | |
| 52 | 9 September 2025 | Parc des Princes, Paris, France | 92 | Iceland | 1–1‡ | 2–1 | 2026 FIFA World Cup qualification | |
| 53 | 10 October 2025 | Parc des Princes, Paris, France | 93 | Azerbaijan | 1–0 | 3–0 | 2026 FIFA World Cup qualification | |
| 54 | 13 November 2025 | Parc des Princes, Paris, France | 94 | Ukraine | 1–0‡ | 4–0 | 2026 FIFA World Cup qualification | |
| 55 | 13 November 2025 | Parc des Princes, Paris, France | 94 | Ukraine | 3–0 | 4–0 | 2026 FIFA World Cup qualification | |
| 56 | 26 March 2026 | Gillette Stadium, Foxborough, United States | 95 | Brazil | 1–0 | 2–1 | Friendly | |
| 57 | 16 June 2026 | MetLife Stadium, East Rutherford, United States | 99 | Senegal | 1–0 | 3–1 | 2026 FIFA World Cup | |
| 58 | 16 June 2026 | MetLife Stadium, East Rutherford, United States | 99 | Senegal | 3–1 | 3–1 | 2026 FIFA World Cup | |
| 59 | 22 June 2026 | Lincoln Financial Field, Philadelphia, United States | 100 | Iraq | 1–0 | 3–0 | 2026 FIFA World Cup | |
| 60 | 22 June 2026 | Lincoln Financial Field, Philadelphia, United States | 100 | Iraq | 2–0 | 3–0 | 2026 FIFA World Cup | |
| 61 | 30 June 2026 | MetLife Stadium, East Rutherford, United States | 102 | Sweden | 1–0 | 3–0 | 2026 FIFA World Cup | |
| 62 | 30 June 2026 | MetLife Stadium, East Rutherford, United States | 102 | Sweden | 3–0 | 3–0 | 2026 FIFA World Cup | |
| 63 | 4 July 2026 | Lincoln Financial Field, Philadelphia, United States | 103 | Paraguay | 1–0‡ | 1–0 | 2026 FIFA World Cup | |
| 64 | 9 July 2026 | Gillette Stadium, Foxborough, United States | 104 | Morocco | 1–0 | 2–0 | 2026 FIFA World Cup | |
| 65 | 18 July 2026 | Hard Rock Stadium, Miami Gardens, United States | 106 | England | 1–4 | 4–6 | 2026 FIFA World Cup | |
| 66 | 18 July 2026 | Hard Rock Stadium, Miami Gardens, United States | 106 | England | 3–4 | 4–6 | 2026 FIFA World Cup | |
| 67 | 25 September 2026 | Kocaeli Stadium, İzmit, Turkey | 107 | Turkey | 1–0 | 1–0 | 2026–27 UEFA Nations League A | |

== Hat-tricks ==
As of match played 18 November 2023

| No. | Opponent | Goals | Score | Venue | Competition | Date | Ref. |
|---|---|---|---|---|---|---|---|
| 1 | Kazakhstan | 4 – (6', 12', 32', 87') | 8–0 | Parc des Princes, Paris, France | 2022 FIFA World Cup qualification | 13 November 2021 | |
| 2 | Argentina | 3 – (80' pen., 81', 118' pen.) | 3–3 (a.e.t.) (2–4 p) | Lusail Stadium, Lusail, Qatar | 2022 FIFA World Cup final | 18 December 2022 | |
| 3 | Gibraltar | 3 – (30' pen., 74', 82') | 14–0 | Allianz Riviera, Nice, France | UEFA Euro 2024 qualifying | 18 November 2023 | |

== Statistics ==
As of match played 15 November 2026

Appearances and goals by year
| Year | Apps | Goals |
|---|---|---|
| 2017 | 10 | 1 |
| 2018 | 18 | 9 |
| 2019 | 6 | 3 |
| 2020 | 5 | 3 |
| 2021 | 14 | 8 |
| 2022 | 13 | 12 |
| 2023 | 9 | 10 |
| 2024 | 11 | 2 |
| 2025 | 8 | 7 |
| 2026 | 14 | 12 |
| Total | 108 | 67 |

Appearances and goals by competition
| Competition | Apps | Goals |
|---|---|---|
| FIFA World Cup qualification | 16 | 11 |
| FIFA World Cup | 22 | 22 |
| UEFA European Championship qualifying | 13 | 12 |
| UEFA European Championship | 9 | 1 |
| UEFA Nations League | 23 | 10 |
| Friendlies | 25 | 11 |
| Total | 108 | 67 |

Goals by opponent
| Opponent | Goals |
|---|---|
| Netherlands | 6 |
| Argentina | 5 |
| Gibraltar | 4 |
| Kazakhstan | 4 |
| Ukraine | 4 |
| Iceland | 3 |
| Poland | 3 |
| Sweden | 3 |
| Austria | 2 |
| Croatia | 2 |
| Denmark | 2 |
| England | 2 |
| Iraq | 2 |
| Russia | 2 |
| Senegal | 2 |
| South Africa | 2 |
| Spain | 2 |
| Andorra | 1 |
| Australia | 1 |
| Azerbaijan | 1 |
| Belgium | 1 |
| Brazil | 1 |
| Finland | 1 |
| Germany | 1 |
| Greece | 1 |
| Luxembourg | 1 |
| Moldova | 1 |
| Morocco | 1 |
| Paraguay | 1 |
| Peru | 1 |
| Scotland | 1 |
| Turkey | 1 |
| United States | 1 |
| Wales | 1 |
| Total | 67 |

== See also ==
- List of leading goalscorers for the France national football team
- List of top international men's football goal scorers by country
- List of men's footballers with 50 or more international goals
- List of international goals scored by Zinedine Zidane
- List of international goals scored by Olivier Giroud
- List of international goals scored by Thierry Henry
- List of footballers with 100 or more caps
