= List of international goals scored by Olivier Giroud =

French footballer

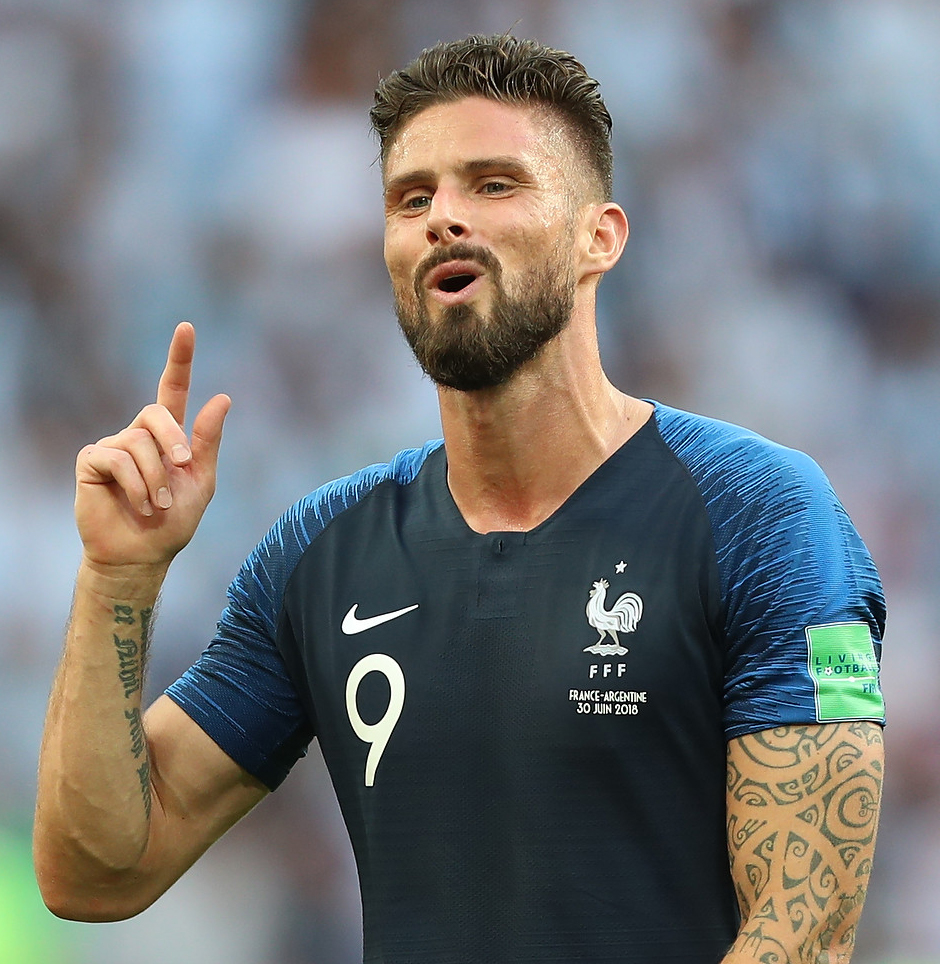
Giroud during the 2018 FIFA World Cup in Russia; he scored 57 goals in 137 appearances for France.

Olivier Giroud is a French professional footballer who played for the France national team as a forward from 2011 to 2024. In that period, he scored 57 goals in 137 international appearances, making him the country's all-time top scorer until his tally was surpassed by Kylian Mbappé in 2026. Giroud surpassed Thierry Henry's previous record of 51 goals after scoring against Poland in the round of 16 of the 2022 FIFA World Cup on 4 December 2022. Giroud made his debut for France in a 1–0 home win over the United States on 11 November 2011, and scored his first international goal on 29 February 2012 in his third appearance, a 2–1 win over Germany.

Giroud's only international hat-trick came in a friendly against Paraguay on 2 June 2017, and he has netted twice in a match on ten occasions. Out of all his opponents, he scored the most against Australia and Iceland, netting four goals against each team. Giroud scored five goals in the FIFA World Cup, three in the UEFA European Championship, five in the UEFA Nations League, six in FIFA World Cup qualification and seven in UEFA European Championship qualification. The remainder of his goals, 29, came in friendlies. His most productive calendar year in terms of international goals was 2017, when he scored eight goals in five matches for France. He also scored eight goals in six matches during 2016. With France, Giroud won the 2018 World Cup, also reaching the 2022 World Cup final and the Euro 2016 final during his international career.

A prolific scorer, Giroud was described as a "target man" and as a "super sub", due to his playing style and penchant for scoring goals after coming off the bench. He was often praised for his overall play and combination with teammates, often described as a "complete striker". When discussing Giroud's scoring capacity, France manager Didier Deschamps explained in 2022, "He's a striker who is so useful for the team even if he doesn't score himself, and there have been periods when he hasn't found the net. But, even then, he helps others to score."

== Goals ==
Scores and results list France's goal tally first, score column indicates score after each Giroud goal.

Table key
Indicates France won the match
Indicates the match ended in a draw
Indicates France lost the match

List of international goals scored by Olivier Giroud
No.	Cap	Date	Venue	Opponent	Score	Result	Competition	Ref.
1	3	29 February 2012	Weserstadion, Bremen, Germany	Germany	1–0	2–1	Friendly	
2	13	16 October 2012	Vicente Calderón Stadium, Madrid, Spain	Spain	1–1	1–1	2014 FIFA World Cup qualification	
3	16	22 March 2013	Stade de France, Saint-Denis, France	Georgia	1–0	3–1	2014 FIFA World Cup qualification	
4	23	11 October 2013	Parc des Princes, Paris, France	Australia	2–0	6–0	Friendly	
5	23	11 October 2013	Parc des Princes, Paris, France	Australia	3–0	6–0	Friendly	
6	28	27 May 2014	Stade de France, Saint-Denis, France	Norway	2–0	4–0	Friendly	
7	28	27 May 2014	Stade de France, Saint-Denis, France	Norway	4–0	4–0	Friendly	
8	30	8 June 2014	Stade Pierre-Mauroy, Villeneuve-d'Ascq, France	Jamaica	4–0	8–0	Friendly	
9	32	20 June 2014	Itaipava Arena Fonte Nova, Salvador, Brazil	Switzerland	1–0	5–2	2014 FIFA World Cup	
10	37	29 March 2015	Stade Geoffroy-Guichard, Saint-Étienne, France	Denmark	2–0	2–0	Friendly	
11	43	11 October 2015	Parken Stadion, Copenhagen, Denmark	Denmark	1–0	2–1	Friendly	
12	43	11 October 2015	Parken Stadion, Copenhagen, Denmark	Denmark	2–0	2–1	Friendly	
13	44	13 November 2015	Stade de France, Saint-Denis, France	Germany	1–0	2–0	Friendly	
14	46	25 March 2016	Amsterdam Arena, Amsterdam, Netherlands	Netherlands	2–0	3–2	Friendly	
15	48	30 May 2016	Stade de la Beaujoire, Nantes, France	Cameroon	2–1	3–2	Friendly	
16	49	4 June 2016	Stade Saint-Symphorien, Metz, France	Scotland	1–0	3–0	Friendly	
17	49	4 June 2016	Stade Saint-Symphorien, Metz, France	Scotland	2–0	3–0	Friendly	
18	50	10 June 2016	Stade de France, Saint-Denis, France	Romania	1–0	2–1	UEFA Euro 2016	
19	53	3 July 2016	Stade de France, Saint-Denis, France	Iceland	1–0	5–2	UEFA Euro 2016	
20	53	3 July 2016	Stade de France, Saint-Denis, France	Iceland	5–1	5–2	UEFA Euro 2016	
21	56	1 September 2016	Stadio San Nicola, Bari, Italy	Italy	2–1	3–1	Friendly	
22	60	25 March 2017	Stade Josy Barthel, Luxembourg City, Luxembourg	Luxembourg	1–0	3–1	2018 FIFA World Cup qualification	
23	60	25 March 2017	Stade Josy Barthel, Luxembourg City, Luxembourg	Luxembourg	3–1	3–1	2018 FIFA World Cup qualification	
24	62	2 June 2017	Roazhon Park, Rennes, France	Paraguay	1–0	5–0	Friendly	
25	62	2 June 2017	Roazhon Park, Rennes, France	Paraguay	2–0	5–0	Friendly	
26	62	2 June 2017	Roazhon Park, Rennes, France	Paraguay	3–0	5–0	Friendly	
27	63	9 June 2017	Friends Arena, Solna, Sweden	Sweden	1–0	1–2	2018 FIFA World Cup qualification	
28	68	10 October 2017	Stade de France, Saint-Denis, France	Belarus	2–0	2–1	2018 FIFA World Cup qualification	
29	69	10 November 2017	Stade de France, Saint-Denis, France	Wales	2–0	2–0	Friendly	
30	70	23 March 2018	Stade de France, Saint-Denis, France	Colombia	1–0	2–3	Friendly	
31	72	28 May 2018	Stade de France, Saint-Denis, France	Republic of Ireland	1–0	2–0	Friendly	
32	83	9 September 2018	Stade de France, Saint-Denis, France	Netherlands	2–1	2–1	2018–19 UEFA Nations League A	
33	87	20 November 2018	Stade de France, Saint-Denis, France	Uruguay	1–0	1–0	Friendly	
34	88	22 March 2019	Zimbru Stadium, Chișinău, Moldova	Moldova	3–0	4–1	UEFA Euro 2020 qualification	
35	89	25 March 2019	Stade de France, Saint-Denis, France	Iceland	2–0	4–0	UEFA Euro 2020 qualification	
36	92	7 September 2019	Stade de France, Saint-Denis, France	Albania	2–0	4–1	UEFA Euro 2020 qualification	
37	94	11 October 2019	Laugardalsvöllur, Reykjavík, Iceland	Iceland	1–0	1–0	UEFA Euro 2020 qualification	
38	95	14 October 2019	Stade de France, Saint-Denis, France	Turkey	1–0	1–1	UEFA Euro 2020 qualification	
39	96	14 November 2019	Stade de France, Saint-Denis, France	Moldova	2–1	2–1	UEFA Euro 2020 qualification	
40	99	8 September 2020	Stade de France, Saint-Denis, France	Croatia	4–2	4–2	2020–21 UEFA Nations League A	
41	100	7 October 2020	Stade de France, Saint-Denis, France	Ukraine	2–0	7–1	Friendly	
42	100	7 October 2020	Stade de France, Saint-Denis, France	Ukraine	3–0	7–1	Friendly	
43	105	17 November 2020	Stade de France, Saint-Denis, France	Sweden	1–1	4–2	2020–21 UEFA Nations League A	
44	105	17 November 2020	Stade de France, Saint-Denis, France	Sweden	3–1	4–2	2020–21 UEFA Nations League A	
45	108	8 June 2021	Stade de France, Saint-Denis, France	Bulgaria	2–0	3–0	Friendly	
46	108	8 June 2021	Stade de France, Saint-Denis, France	Bulgaria	3–0	3–0	Friendly	
47	111	24 March 2022	Stade Vélodrome, Marseille, France	Ivory Coast	1–1	2–1	Friendly	
48	112	29 March 2022	Stade Pierre-Mauroy, Villeneuve-d'Ascq, France	South Africa	2–0	5–0	Friendly	
49	113	22 September 2022	Stade de France, Saint-Denis, France	Austria	2–0	2–0	2022–23 UEFA Nations League A	
50	115	22 November 2022	Al Janoub Stadium, Al Wakrah, Qatar	Australia	2–1	4–1	2022 FIFA World Cup	
51	115	22 November 2022	Al Janoub Stadium, Al Wakrah, Qatar	Australia	4–1	4–1	2022 FIFA World Cup	
52	117	4 December 2022	Al Thumama Stadium, Doha, Qatar	Poland	1–0	3–1	2022 FIFA World Cup	
53	118	10 December 2022	Al Bayt Stadium, Al Khor, Qatar	England	2–1	2–1	2022 FIFA World Cup	
54	123	16 June 2023	Estádio Algarve, Algarve, Portugal	Gibraltar	1–0	3–0	UEFA Euro 2024 qualification	
55	128	18 November 2023	Allianz Riviera, Nice, France	Gibraltar	13–0	14–0	UEFA Euro 2024 qualification	
56	128	18 November 2023	Allianz Riviera, Nice, France	Gibraltar	14–0	14–0	UEFA Euro 2024 qualification	
57	131	26 March 2024	Stade Vélodrome, Marseille, France	Chile	3–1	3–2	Friendly	

== Statistics ==
Appearances and goals by year
Year	Competitive		Friendly		Total	
Year	Apps	Goals	Apps	Goals	Apps	Goals
2011	0	0	2	0	2	0
2012	5 (Note: Two appearances and one goal in FIFA World Cup qualification, three appearances in UEFA European Championship)	1	7	1	12	2
2013	7 (Note: Appearances in FIFA World Cup qualification)	1	5	2	12	3
2014	5 (Note: Appearances in FIFA World Cup)	1	4	3	9	4
2015	0	0	10	4	10	4
2016	8 (Note: Six appearances and three goals in UEFA European Championship, two appearances in FIFA World Cup qualification)	3	6	5	14	8
2017	6	3	4	5	10	8
2018	11 (Note: Four appearances and one goal in UEFA Nations League, seven appearances in FIFA World Cup)	1	7	3	18	4
2019	10 (Note: Appearances in UEFA European Championship qualification)	6	0	0	10	6
2020	6 (Note: Appearances in UEFA Nations League)	3	2	2	8	5
2021	4 (Note: Two appearances in FIFA World Cup qualification, two appearances in UEFA European Championship)	0	1	2	5	2
2022	8 (Note: Two appearances and one goal in UEFA Nations League, six appearances and four goals in FIFA World Cup)	5	2	2	10	7
2023	9	3	0	0	9	3
2024	4 (Note: Appearances in UEFA European Championship)	0	4	1	8	1
Total	83	27	54	30	137	57

Appearances and goals by competition
Competition	Apps	Goals
Friendlies	54	29
FIFA World Cup	18	5
UEFA European Championship	15	3
UEFA Nations League	12	5
FIFA World Cup qualification	19	6
UEFA Euro qualification	19	9
Total	137	57

Appearances and goals by confederation
Confederation	Apps	Goals
AFC	4	4
CAF	6	3
CONCACAF	5	1
CONMEBOL	14	6
UEFA	108	43
Total	137	57

Goals by opponent
Opponent	Goals
Australia	4
Iceland	4
Denmark	3
Gibraltar	3
Paraguay	3
Sweden	3
Bulgaria	2
Germany	2
Luxembourg	2
Moldova	2
Netherlands	2
Norway	2
Scotland	2
Ukraine	2
Albania	1
Austria	1
Belarus	1
Cameroon	1
Chile	1
Colombia	1
Croatia	1
England	1
Georgia	1
Italy	1
Ivory Coast	1
Jamaica	1
Poland	1
Republic of Ireland	1
Romania	1
South Africa	1
Spain	1
Switzerland	1
Turkey	1
Uruguay	1
Wales	1
Total	57

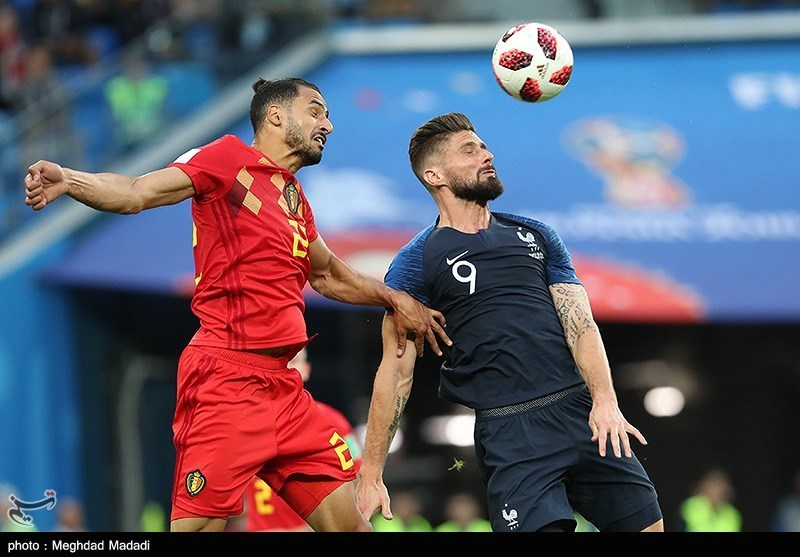
Giroud playing against Belgium in 2018

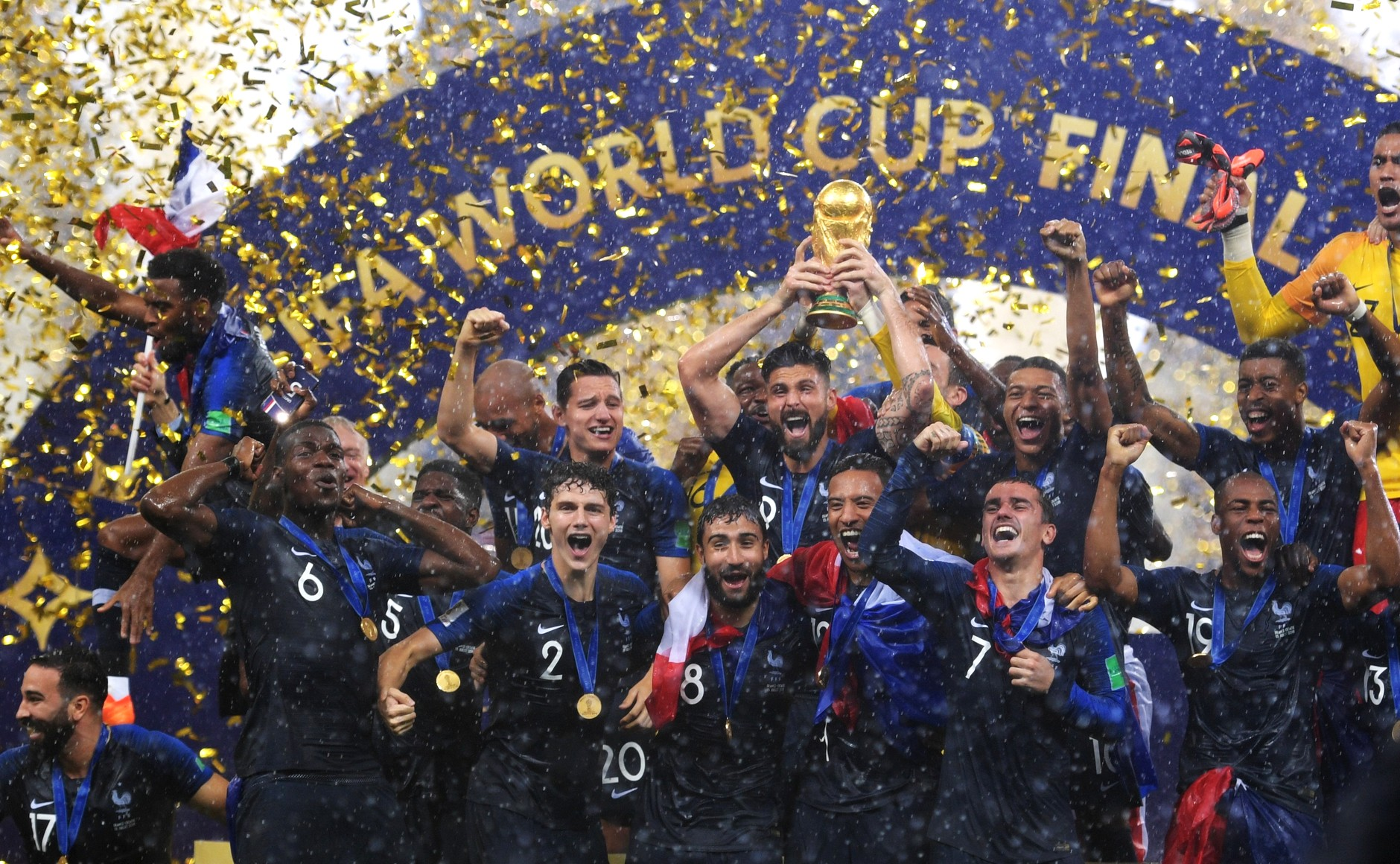
Giroud holding the FIFA World Cup Trophy following France's victory in the 2018 FIFA World Cup final

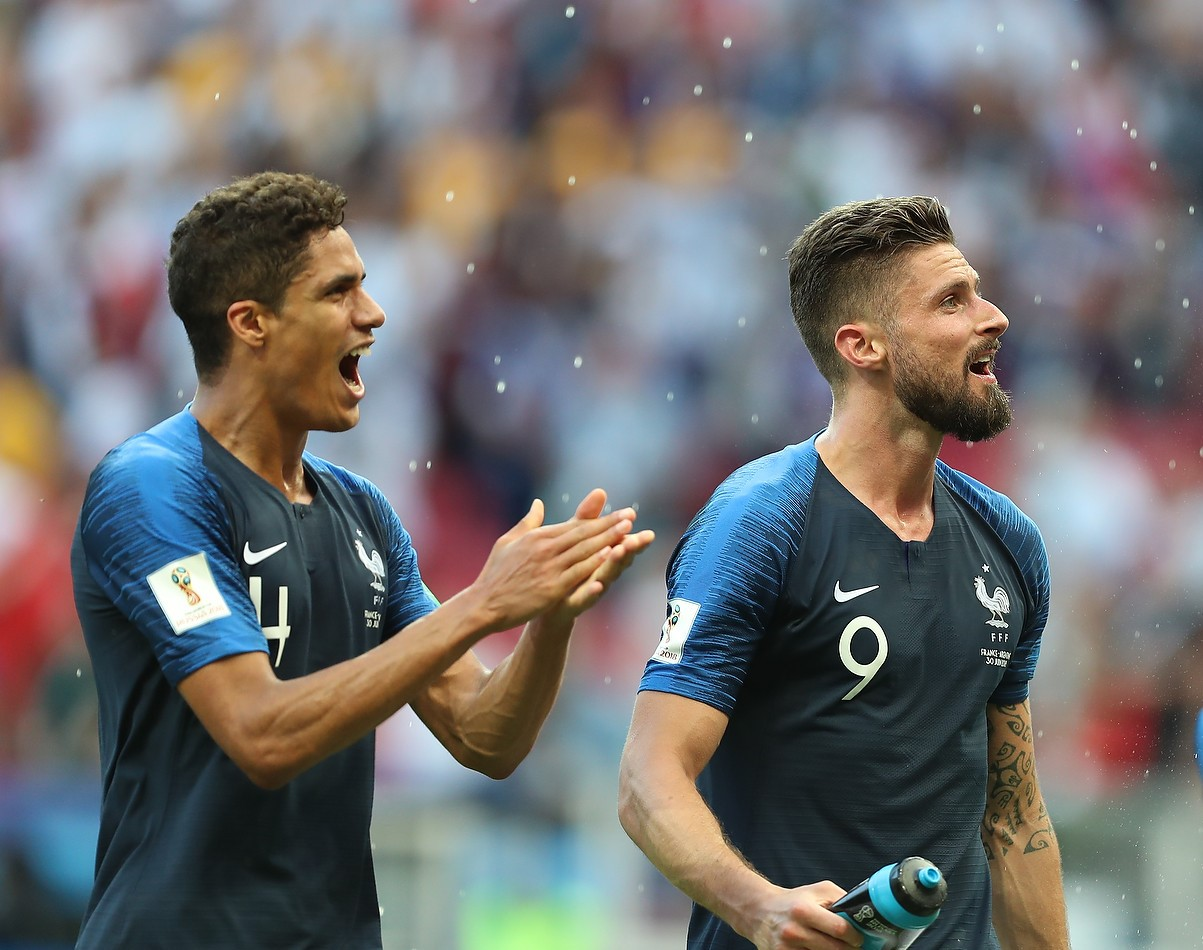
Raphaël Varane (left) and Giroud playing for France in 2018

== See also ==
- List of leading goalscorers for the France national football team
- List of top international men's football goal scorers by country
- List of men's footballers with 50 or more international goals
- List of international goals scored by Zinedine Zidane
- List of international goals scored by Kylian Mbappé
- List of international goals scored by Thierry Henry
- List of footballers with 100 or more caps
