= List of international goals scored by Bader Al-Mutawa =

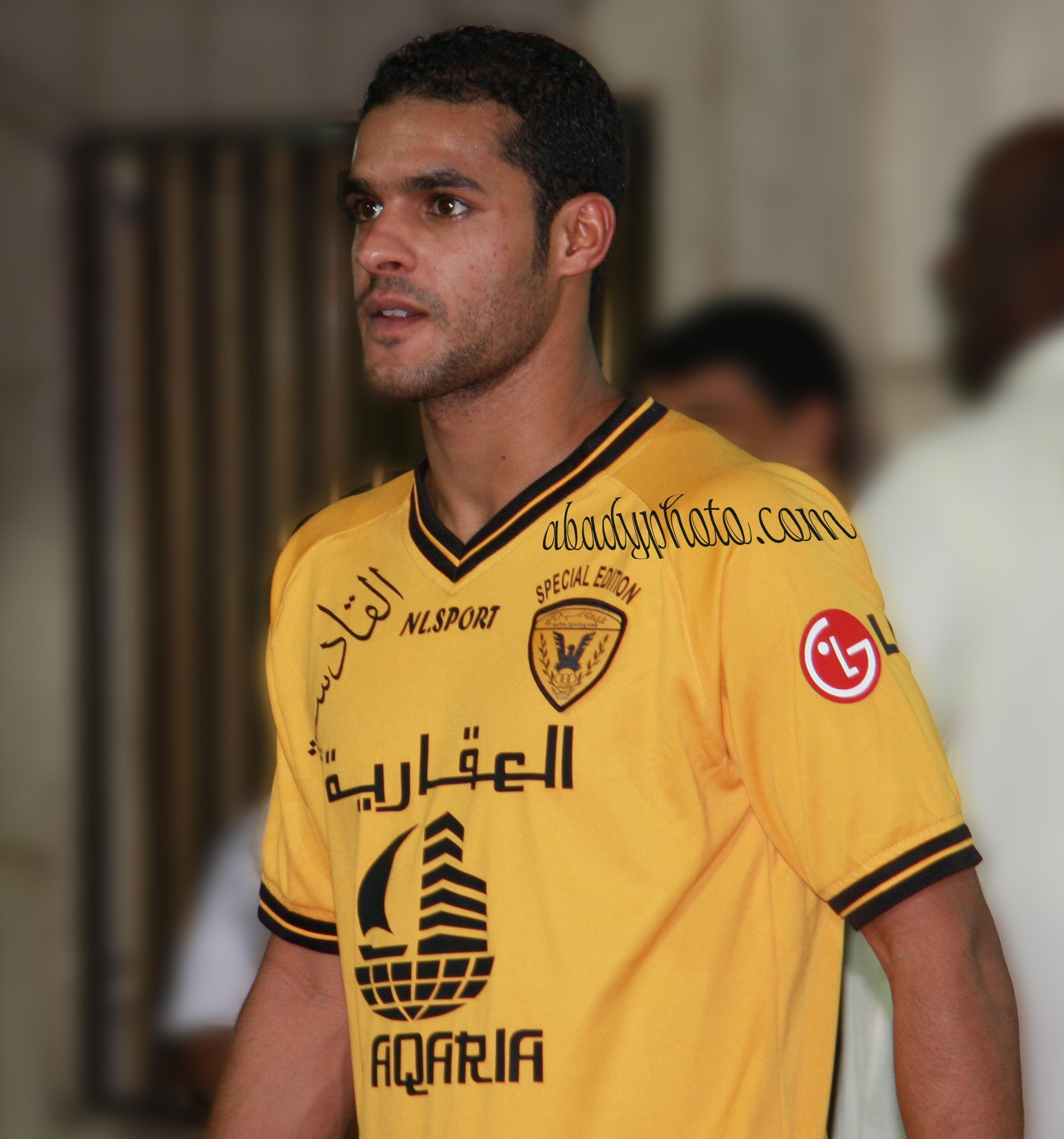
Bader Al-Mutawa with Qadsia in 2007. He is the second most capped men's footballer of all time.

Bader Al-Mutawa is a Kuwaiti professional footballer who has represented the Kuwait national football team as a forward since his debut in 2003. He is the fourth highest-scoring Kuwaiti footballer ever, having scored 56 goals. With 202 senior appearances, he is also the fourth most capped male footballer.

== International goals ==
Scores and results list Kuwait's goal tally first, score column indicates score after each Al-Mutawa goal.

List of international goals scored by Bader Al-Mutawa
No.	Date	Venue	Opponent	Score	Result	Competition	Ref.
1	4 September 2003	Singapore National Stadium, Kallang, Singapore	Singapore	2–1	3–1	2004 AFC Asian Cup qualification	
2	27 September 2003	Mohammed Al-Hamad Stadium, Hawally, Kuwait	Singapore	2–0	4–0	2004 AFC Asian Cup qualification	
3	5 October 2003	Mohammed Al-Hamad Stadium, Hawally, Kuwait	Palestine	2–0	2–1	2004 AFC Asian Cup qualification	
4	8 October 2003	Mohammed Al-Hamad Stadium, Hawally, Kuwait	Palestine	2–0	4–0	2004 AFC Asian Cup qualification	
5	8 October 2003	Mohammed Al-Hamad Stadium, Hawally, Kuwait	Palestine	3–0	4–0	2004 AFC Asian Cup qualification	
6	1 January 2004	Al-Sadaqua Walsalam Stadium, Kuwait City, Kuwait	Yemen	3–0	4–0	16th Arabian Gulf Cup	
7	31 March 2004	Darul Makmur Stadium, Kuantan, Malaysia	Malaysia	1–0	2–0	2006 FIFA World Cup qualification	
8	9 June 2004	Al-Sadaqua Walsalam Stadium, Kuwait City, Kuwait	Hong Kong	2–0	4–0	2006 FIFA World Cup qualification	
9	19 July 2004	Shandong Provincial Stadium, Jinan, China	United Arab Emirates	2–0	3–1	2004 AFC Asian Cup	
10	17 November 2004	Al-Sadaqua Walsalam Stadium, Kuwait City, Kuwait	Malaysia	1–0	6–1	2006 FIFA World Cup qualification	
11	11 December 2004	Ahmed bin Ali Stadium, Al Rayyan, Qatar	Saudi Arabia	2–1	2–1	17th Arabian Gulf Cup	
12	17 December 2004	Jassim bin Hamad Stadium, Doha, Qatar	Yemen	2–0	3–0	17th Arabian Gulf Cup	
13	18 March 2005	Sheikh Khalifa International Stadium, Al Ain, United Arab Emirates	Armenia	2–0	3–1	Friendly	
14	29 July 2005	Stade de Genève, Lancy, Switzerland	United Arab Emirates	1–1	1–1 (6–7 p)	Friendly	
15	17 August 2005	Pakhtakor Central Stadium, Tashkent, Uzbekistan	Uzbekistan	1–0	2–3	2006 FIFA World Cup qualification	
16	3 February 2006	Al Kuwait Sports Club Stadium, Kuwait City, Kuwait	Singapore	2–0	2–2	Friendly	
17	6 September 2006	Al Kuwait Sports Club Stadium, Kuwait City, Kuwait	Australia	2–0	2–0	2007 AFC Asian Cup qualification	
18	9 November 2006	Sheikh Khalifa International Stadium, Al Ain, United Arab Emirates	Taiwan	8–0	10–0	Friendly	
19	17 January 2007	Zayed Sports City Stadium, Abu Dhabi, United Arab Emirates	Yemen	1–1	1–1	18th Arabian Gulf Cup	
20	23 January 2007	Mohammed bin Zayed Stadium, Abu Dhabi, United Arab Emirates	United Arab Emirates	1–1	2–3	18th Arabian Gulf Cup	
21	23 January 2009	Al-Sadaqua Walsalam Stadium, Kuwait City, Kuwait	Syria	2–2	2–3	Friendly	
22	3 November 2009	Cairo, Egypt	Kenya	3–0	5–0	Friendly	
23	3 November 2009	Cairo, Egypt	Kenya	4–0	5–0	Friendly	
24	14 November 2009	Al Kuwait Sports Club Stadium, Kuwait City, Kuwait	Indonesia	1–1	2–1	2011 AFC Asian Cup qualification	
25	14 November 2009	Al Kuwait Sports Club Stadium, Kuwait City, Kuwait	Indonesia	2–1	2–1	2011 AFC Asian Cup qualification	
26	11 August 2010	Tofiq Bahramov Republican Stadium, Baku, Azerbaijan	Azerbaijan	1–1	1–1	Friendly	
27	3 September 2010	Al-Sadaqua Walsalam Stadium, Kuwait City, Kuwait	Syria	2–0	3–0	Friendly	
28	14 November 2010	Al Nahyan Stadium, Abu Dhabi, United Arab Emirates	India	2–0	9–1	Friendly	
29	14 November 2010	Al Nahyan Stadium, Abu Dhabi, United Arab Emirates	India	5–0	9–1	Friendly	
30	14 November 2010	Al Nahyan Stadium, Abu Dhabi, United Arab Emirates	India	7–0	9–1	Friendly	
31	14 November 2010	Al Nahyan Stadium, Abu Dhabi, United Arab Emirates	India	9–1	9–1	Friendly	
32	28 November 2010	Al-Wihda Stadium, Zinjibar, Yemen	Yemen	2–0	3–0	20th Arabian Gulf Cup	
33	28 November 2010	Al-Wihda Stadium, Zinjibar, Yemen	Yemen	3–0	3–0	20th Arabian Gulf Cup	
34	2 December 2010	22 May Stadium, Aden, Yemen	Iraq	1–0	2–2 (5–4 p)	20th Arabian Gulf Cup	
35	31 December 2010	Suez Stadium, Suez, Egypt	Zambia	3–0	4–0	Friendly	
36	12 January 2011	Thani bin Jassim Stadium, Al Rayyan, Qatar	Uzbekistan	1–1	1–2	2011 AFC Asian Cup	
37	16 July 2011	Amman International Stadium, Amman, Jordan	Saudi Arabia	1–0	1–0	Friendly	
38	2 September 2011	Tahnoun bin Mohammed Stadium, Al Ain, United Arab Emirates	United Arab Emirates	2–0	3–2	2014 FIFA World Cup qualification	
–	17 December 2011	Jassim bin Hamad Stadium, Doha, Qatar	Saudi Arabia U23	2–0	2–0 (Note: Not recognised as full international matches by FIFA)	2011 Arab Games	
39	22 December 2011	Thani bin Jassim Stadium, Al Rayyan, Qatar	Palestine	3–0	3–0	2011 Arab Games	
40	17 January 2012	Al-Sadaqua Walsalam Stadium, Kuwait City, Kuwait	Uzbekistan	1–0	1–0	Friendly	
41	16 October 2012	Al Kuwait Sports Club Stadium, Kuwait City, Kuwait	Philippines	1–0	2–1	Friendly	
42	8 December 2012	Al-Sadaqua Walsalam Stadium, Kuwait City, Kuwait	Palestine	2–0	2–1	2012 WAFF Championship	
43	6 January 2013	Khalifa Sports City Stadium, Isa Town, Bahrain	Yemen	2–0	2–0	21st Arabian Gulf Cup	
44	18 January 2013	Bahrain National Stadium, Riffa, Bahrain	Bahrain	5–1	6–1	21st Arabian Gulf Cup	
45	6 September 2013	Jaber Al-Ahmad International Stadium, Kuwait City, Kuwait	North Korea	1–0	2–1	Friendly	
46	6 September 2013	Jaber Al-Ahmad International Stadium, Kuwait City, Kuwait	North Korea	2–1	2–1	Friendly	
47	9 September 2013	Al-Sadaqua Walsalam Stadium, Kuwait City, Kuwait	Bahrain	1–1	2–1	Friendly	
48	17 November 2004	Prince Abdullah Al-Faisal Sports City, Jeddah, Saudi Arabia	United Arab Emirates	2–2	2–2	22nd Arabian Gulf Cup	
49	3 September 2015	Abdullah bin Khalifa Stadium, Doha, Qatar	Myanmar	7–0	9–0	2018 FIFA World Cup qualification	
50	3 September 2015	Abdullah bin Khalifa Stadium, Doha, Qatar	Myanmar	8–0	9–0	2018 FIFA World Cup qualification	
51	3 September 2015	Abdullah bin Khalifa Stadium, Doha, Qatar	Myanmar	9–0	9–0	2018 FIFA World Cup qualification	
52	8 September 2015	New Laos National Stadium, Vientiane, Laos	Laos	2–0	2–0	2018 FIFA World Cup qualification	
53	28 December 2018	Al Maktoum Stadium, Dubai. United Arab Emirates	United Arab Emirates	1–0	2–0	Friendly	
54	5 September 2019	Al Kuwait Sports Club Stadium, Kuwait City, Kuwait	Nepal	5–0	7–0	2022 FIFA World Cup qualification	
55	14 November 2019	Al Kuwait Sports Club Stadium, Kuwait City, Kuwait	Taiwan	4–0	9–0	2022 FIFA World Cup qualification	
56	19 November 2019	Changlimithang Stadium, Thimphu, Bhutan	Nepal	1–0	1–0	2022 FIFA World Cup qualification	

== Hat-tricks ==
No.	Date	Venue	Opponent	Goals	Result	Competition	Ref.
1	14 November 2010	Al Nahyan Stadium, Abu Dhabi, United Arab Emirates	India	4 - (25', 55', 66', 90')	9–1	Friendly	
2	3 September 2015	Abdullah bin Khalifa Stadium, Doha, Qatar	Myanmar	3 - (69' pen, 89', 93')	9–0	2018 FIFA World Cup qualification	

== Statistics ==
Appearances and goals by national team and year
National team	Year	Apps	Goals
Kuwait	2003	13	5
Kuwait	2004	23	7
Kuwait	2005	13	3
Kuwait	2006	8	3
Kuwait	2007	4	2
Kuwait	2008	9	0
Kuwait	2009	18	5
Kuwait	2010	15	10
Kuwait	2011	19	4
Kuwait	2012	10	3
Kuwait	2013	12	5
Kuwait	2014	9	1
Kuwait	2015	9	4
Kuwait	2016	0	0
Kuwait	2017	4	0
Kuwait	2018	5	1
Kuwait	2019	12	3
Kuwait	2020	0	0
Kuwait	2021	11	0
Kuwait	2022	8	0
Total		202	56

Goals by competition
Competition	Goals
AFC Asian Cup qualification	8
FIFA World Cup qualification	12
Friendlies	21
AFC Asian Cup	2
Arabian Gulf Cup	9
Arab Games	1
WAFF Championship	1
Total	56

Goals by opponent
Opponent	Goals
United Arab Emirates	6
Yemen	6
Palestine	5
India	4
Myanmar	3
Singapore	3
Uzbekistan	3
Bahrain	2
Indonesia	2
Kenya	2
Malaysia	2
Nepal	2
North Korea	2
Saudi Arabia	2
Syria	2
Taiwan	2
Armenia	1
Australia	1
Azerbaijan	1
Hong Kong	1
Iraq	1
Laos	1
Philippines	1
Zambia	1
Total	56
