= List of international goals scored by Raúl =

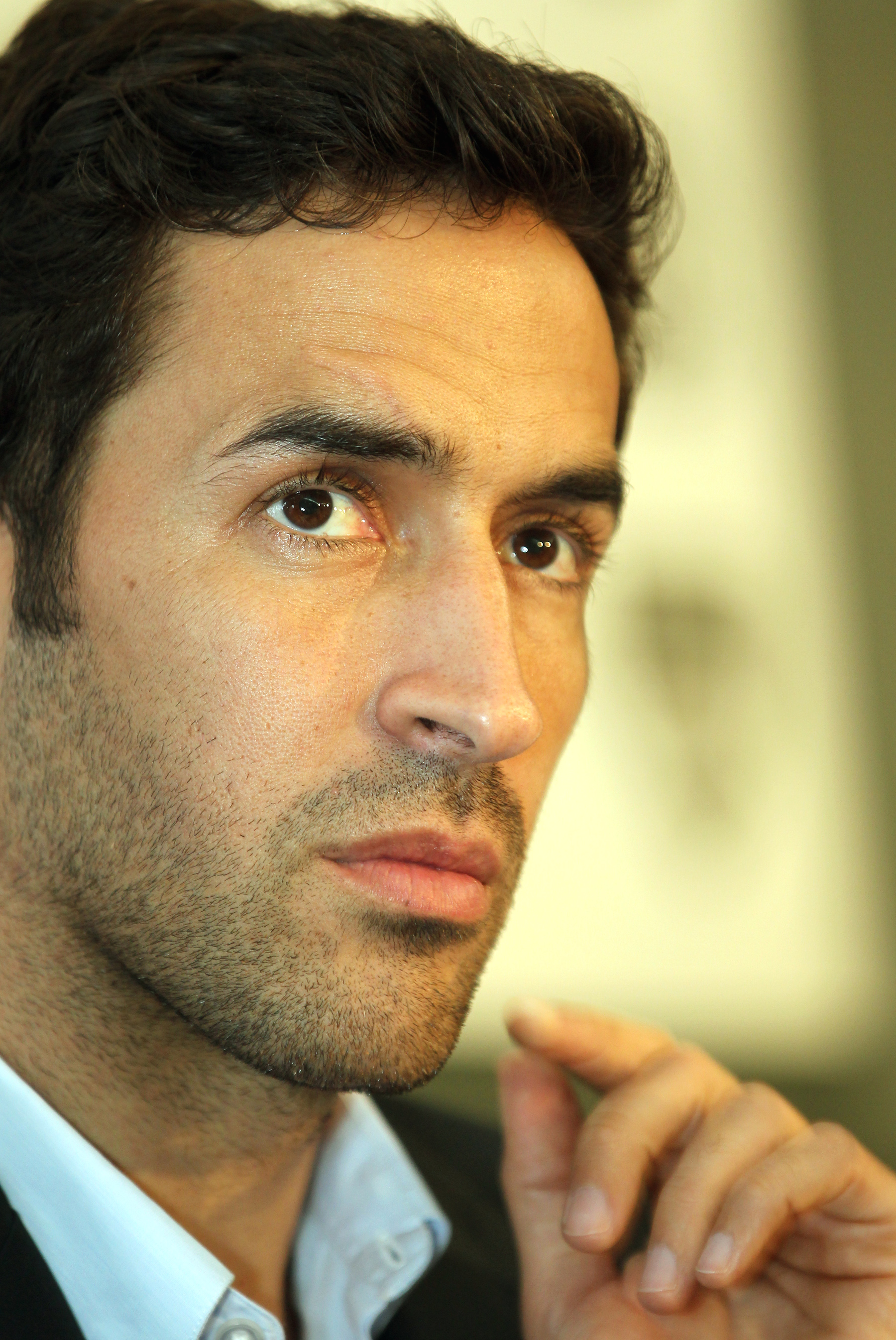
Raúl in 2012

Raúl is a Spanish former professional footballer who made 102 appearances for the Spain national team between 1996 and 2006.

With 44 goals, Raúl is Spain's second-highest all-time goalscorer, behind only David Villa. The following is a list of all the international goals he has scored.

== International goals ==
Scores and results list Spain's goal tally first, score column indicates score after each Raúl goal.

List of international goals scored by Raúl
No.	Cap	Date	Venue	Opponent	Score	Result	Competition	Ref.
1	3	14 December 1996	Mestalla, Valencia, Spain	FR Yugoslavia	2–0	2–0	1998 FIFA World Cup qualification	
2	12	25 March 1998	Balaídos, Vigo, Spain	Sweden	3–0	4–0	Friendly	
3	14	13 June 1998	Stade de la Beaujoire, Nantes, France	Nigeria	2–1	2–3	1998 FIFA World Cup	
4	17	5 September 1998	Antonis Papadopoulos Stadium, Larnaca, Cyprus	Cyprus	1–2	2–3	UEFA Euro 2000 qualifying	
5	20	18 November 1998	Stadio Arechi, Salerno, Italy	Italy	2–2	2–2	Friendly	
6	21	27 March 1999	Mestalla, Valencia, Spain	Austria	1–0	9–0	UEFA Euro 2000 qualifying	
7	21	27 March 1999	Mestalla, Valencia, Spain	Austria	2–0	9–0	UEFA Euro 2000 qualifying	
8	21	27 March 1999	Mestalla, Valencia, Spain	Austria	6–0	9–0	UEFA Euro 2000 qualifying	
9	21	27 March 1999	Mestalla, Valencia, Spain	Austria	7–0	9–0	UEFA Euro 2000 qualifying	
10	22	31 March 1999	San Marino Stadium, Serravalle, San Marino	San Marino	2–0	6–0	UEFA Euro 2000 qualifying	
11	22	31 March 1999	San Marino Stadium, Serravalle, San Marino	San Marino	4–0	6–0	UEFA Euro 2000 qualifying	
12	22	31 March 1999	San Marino Stadium, Serravalle, San Marino	San Marino	5–0	6–0	UEFA Euro 2000 qualifying	
13	23	5 June 1999	El Madrigal, Villarreal, Spain	San Marino	5–0	9–0	UEFA Euro 2000 qualifying	
14	25	4 September 1999	Ernst-Happel-Stadion, Vienna, Austria	Austria	1–0	3–1	UEFA Euro 2000 qualifying	
15	27	10 October 1999	Carlos Belmonte, Albacete, Spain	Israel	3–0	3–0	UEFA Euro 2000 qualifying	
16	30	26 January 2000	Cartagonova, Cartagena, Spain	Poland	1–0	3–0	Friendly	
17	33	18 June 2000	Amsterdam Arena, Amsterdam, Netherlands	Slovenia	1–0	2–1	UEFA Euro 2000	
18	36	16 August 2000	Niedersachsenstadion, Hanover, Germany	Germany	1–4	1–4	Friendly	
19	42	24 March 2001	José Rico Pérez, Alicante, Spain	Liechtenstein	4–0	5–0	2002 FIFA World Cup qualification	
20	45	2 June 2001	Carlos Tartiere, Oviedo, Spain	Bosnia and Herzegovina	3–1	4–1	2002 FIFA World Cup qualification	
21	46	6 June 2001	Ramat Gan Stadium, Ramat Gan, Israel	Israel	1–1	1–1	2002 FIFA World Cup qualification	
22	48	5 September 2001	Rheinpark Stadion, Vaduz, Liechtenstein	Liechtenstein	1–0	2–0	2002 FIFA World Cup qualification	
23	49	14 November 2001	Nuevo Colombino, Huelva, Spain	Mexico	1–0	1–0	Friendly	
24	51	17 April 2002	Windsor Park, Belfast, Northern Ireland	Northern Ireland	1–0	5–0	Friendly	
25	51	17 April 2002	Windsor Park, Belfast, Northern Ireland	Northern Ireland	3–0	5–0	Friendly	
26	52	2 June 2002	Gwangju World Cup Stadium, Gwangju, South Korea	Slovenia	1–0	3–1	2002 FIFA World Cup	
27	52	12 June 2002	Daejeon World Cup Stadium, Daejeon, South Korea	South Africa	1–0	3–2	2002 FIFA World Cup	
28	52	12 June 2002	Daejeon World Cup Stadium, Daejeon, South Korea	South Africa	3–2	3–2	2002 FIFA World Cup	
29	57	7 September 2002	Leoforos Alexandras Stadium, Athens, Greece	Greece	1–0	2–0	UEFA Euro 2004 qualifying	
30	59	12 February 2003	Estadi Mallorca Son Moix, Palma, Spain	Germany	1–0	3–1	Friendly	
31	59	12 February 2003	Estadi Mallorca Son Moix, Palma, Spain	Germany	2–1	3–1	Friendly	
32	60	29 March 2003	Olympic Stadium, Kyiv, Ukraine	Ukraine	1–1	2–2	UEFA Euro 2004 qualifying	
33	65	10 September 2003	Martínez Valero, Elche, Spain	Ukraine	1–0	2–1	UEFA Euro 2004 qualifying	
34	65	10 September 2003	Martínez Valero, Elche, Spain	Ukraine	2–0	2–1	UEFA Euro 2004 qualifying	
35	66	11 October 2003	Vazgen Sargsyan Republican Stadium, Yerevan, Armenia	Armenia	2–0	4–0	UEFA Euro 2004 qualifying	
36	67	15 November 2003	Mestalla, Valencia, Spain	Norway	1–1	2–1	UEFA Euro 2004 qualifying	
37	68	19 November 2003	Ullevaal Stadion, Oslo, Norway	Norway	1–0	3–0	UEFA Euro 2004 qualifying	
38	70	31 March 2004	El Molinón, Gijón, Spain	Denmark	2–0	2–0	Friendly	
39	77	3 September 2004	Ciutat de València, Valencia, Spain	Scotland	1–1	1–1	Friendly	
40	79	9 October 2004	El Sardinero, Santander, Spain	Belgium	2–0	2–0	2006 FIFA World Cup qualification	
41	82	9 February 2005	Estadio de los Juegos Mediterráneos, Almería, Spain	San Marino	3–0	5–0	2006 FIFA World Cup qualification	
42	88	7 September 2005	Vicente Calderón, Madrid, Spain	Serbia and Montenegro	1–0	1–1	2006 FIFA World Cup qualification	
43	94	3 June 2006	Martínez Valero, Elche, Spain	Egypt	1–0	2–0	Friendly	
44	97	19 June 2006	Gottlieb-Daimler-Stadion, Stuttgart, Germany	Tunisia	1–1	3–1	2006 FIFA World Cup	

== Hat-tricks ==
No.	Date	Venue	Opponent	Goals	Result	Competition	Ref.
1	27 March 1999	Mestalla Stadium, Valencia, Spain	Austria	4 – (6', 17', 47', 75')	9–0	UEFA Euro 2000 qualifying	
2	31 March 1999	San Marino Stadium, Serravalle, San Marino	San Marino	3 – (45', 59', 66')	6–0	UEFA Euro 2000 qualifying	

== Statistics ==
Appearances and goals by year
Year	Apps	Goals
1996	4	1
1997	6	0
1998	10	4
1999	9	10
2000	11	3
2001	9	5
2002	9	6
2003	10	8
2004	13	3
2005	11	2
2006	10	2
Total	102	44

Goals by competition
Competition	Goals
UEFA European Championship qualifying	18
FIFA World Cup qualification	8
Friendlies	12
UEFA European Championship	1
FIFA World Cup	5
Total	44

Goals by opponent
Opponent	Goals
Austria	5
San Marino	5
Germany	3
Ukraine	3
Israel	2
Liechtenstein	2
Northern Ireland	2
Norway	2
Serbia and Montenegro (Note: Known as FR Yugoslavia until 2003)	2
Slovenia	2
South Africa	2
Armenia	1
Belgium	1
Bosnia and Herzegovina	1
Cyprus	1
Denmark	1
Egypt	1
Greece	1
Italy	1
Mexico	1
Nigeria	1
Poland	1
Scotland	1
Sweden	1
Tunisia	1
Total	44
