= List of leading goalscorers for the France national football team =

This list of leading goalscorers for the France national football team contains football players who have played for the France national football team and is listed according to their number of goals scored. The France national football team (French: Equipe de France) represents the nation of France in international football. It is fielded by the French Football Federation (French: Fédération Française de Football) and competes as a member of UEFA.

As hundreds of players have played for the team since it started officially registering its players in 1904, only players with 10 or more official goals are included. The national team's record goal-scorer is Kylian Mbappe with 67 goals.

- Goals and appearances are composed of FIFA World Cup and UEFA European Championship matches and each competition's required qualification matches, as well as UEFA Nations League matches, FIFA Confederations Cup matches and numerous international friendly tournaments and matches.

Statistics correct as of match played 15 November 2026

Key
| § | Still active for the national team |
| † | Played in team that won the 1998 FIFA World Cup |
| † | Played in team that won the 2018 FIFA World Cup |
| GK | Goalkeeper |
| DF | Defender |
| MF | Midfielder |
| FW | Forward |

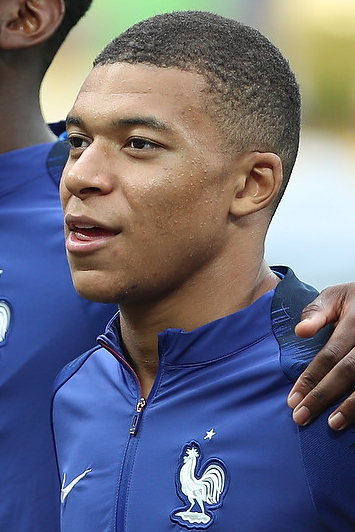
Kylian Mbappé (67 goals) is the all-time leading goalscorer of the national team.

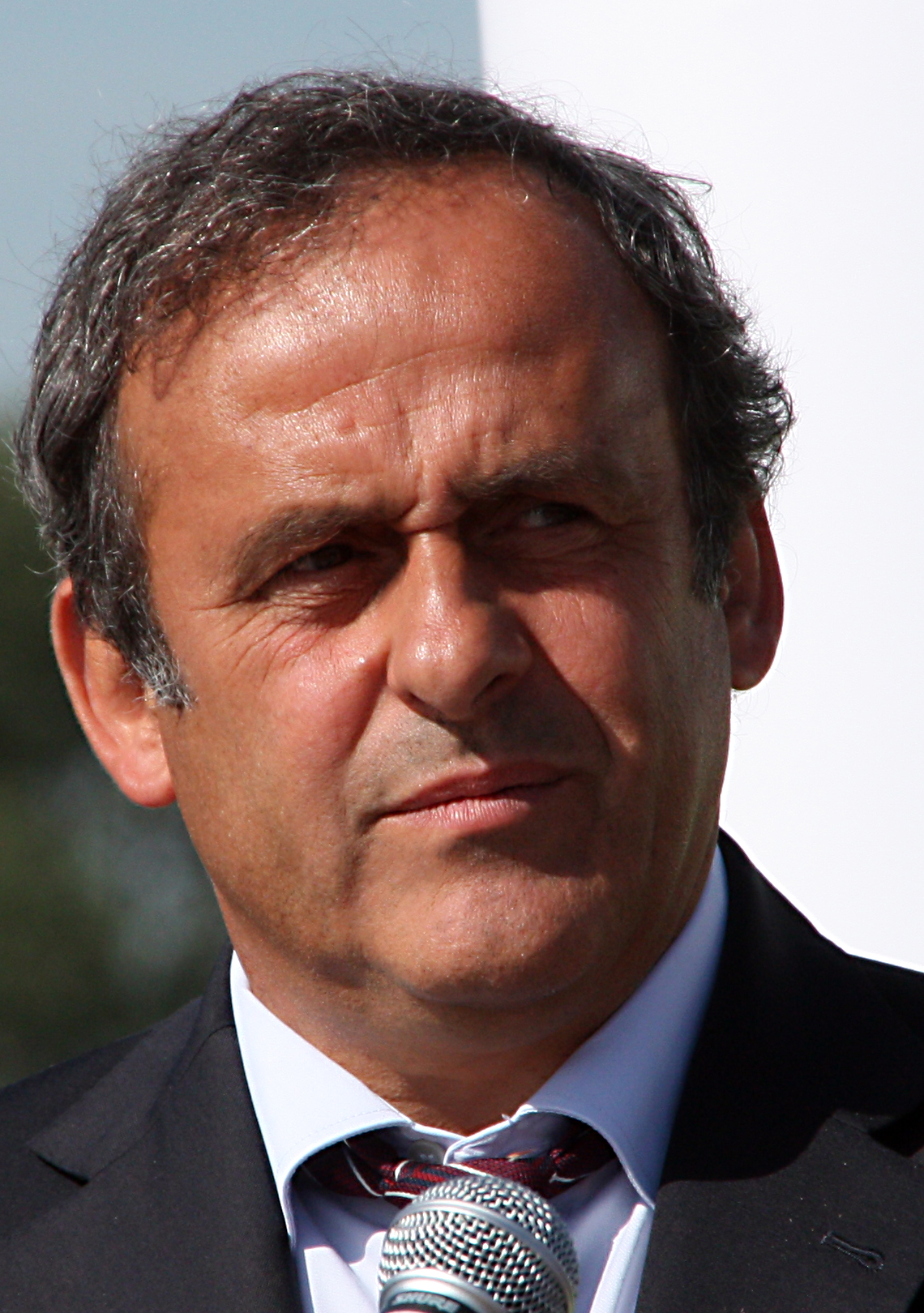
Michel Platini (41 goals) captained France to victory at UEFA Euro 1984.

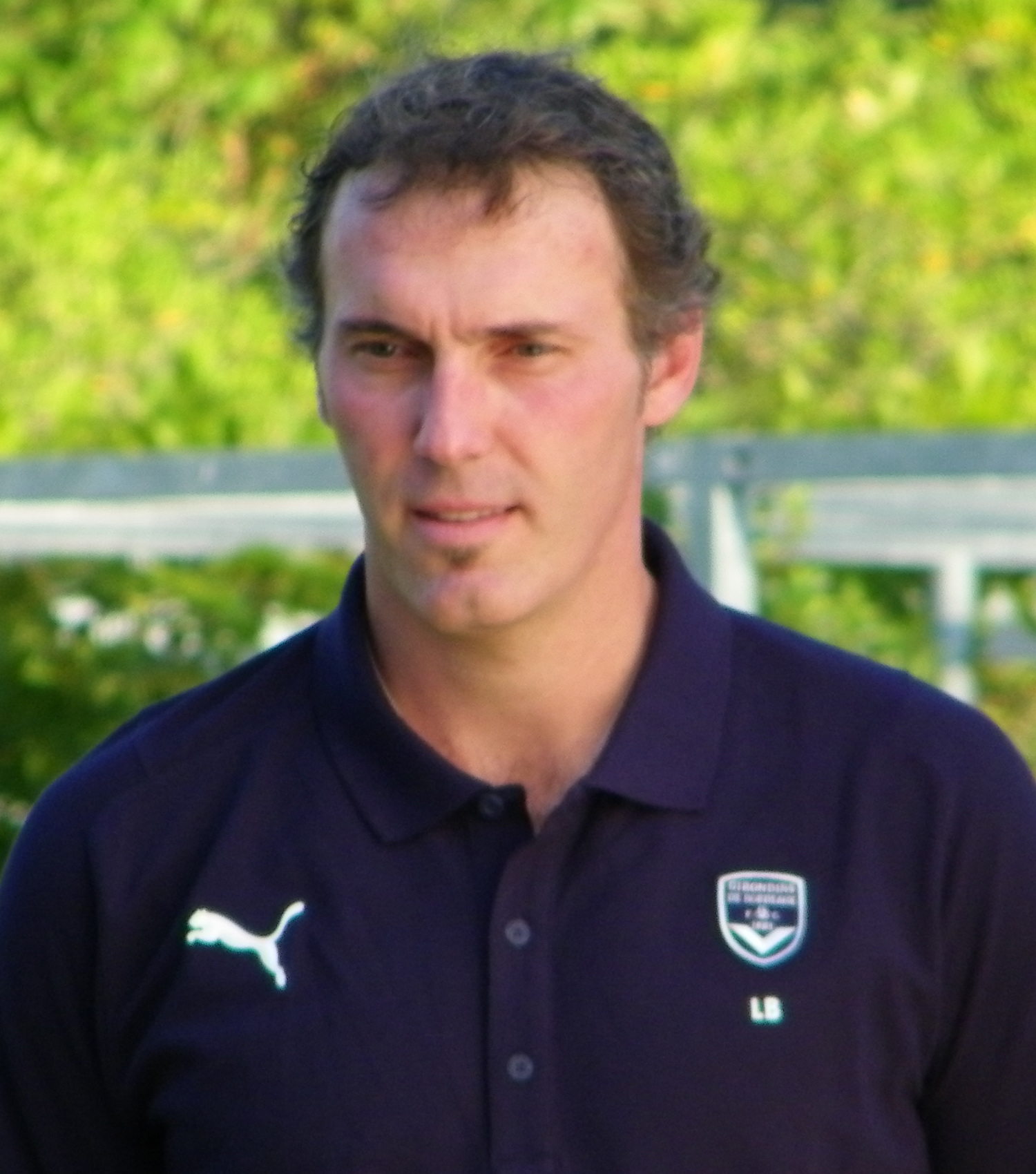
Laurent Blanc (16 goals) is the highest-scoring defender in national team history.

| Rank | Player | Position | National team career | Goals | Caps | Average |
|---|---|---|---|---|---|---|
| 1 | Kylian Mbappé^{§} | FW | 2017–^{†} | 67 | 108 | 0.62 |
| 2 | Olivier Giroud | FW | 2011–2024^{†} | 57 | 137 | 0.42 |
| 3 | Thierry Henry | FW | 1997–2010^{†} | 51 | 123 | 0.41 |
| 4 | Antoine Griezmann | FW | 2014–2024^{†} | 44 | 137 | 0.32 |
| 5 | Michel Platini | MF | 1976–1987 | 41 | 72 | 0.57 |
| 6 | Karim Benzema | FW | 2007–2022 | 37 | 97 | 0.38 |
| 7 | David Trezeguet | FW | 1998–2008^{†} | 34 | 71 | 0.48 |
| 8 | Zinedine Zidane | MF | 1994–2006^{†} | 31 | 106 | 0.29 |
| 9 | Just Fontaine | FW | 1953–1960 | 30 | 21 | 1.43 |
| 9 | Jean-Pierre Papin | FW | 1986–1995 | 30 | 54 | 0.56 |
| 11 | Youri Djorkaeff | MF | 1993–2002^{†} | 28 | 82 | 0.34 |
| 12 | Sylvain Wiltord | FW | 1999–2006 | 26 | 92 | 0.28 |
| 13 | Jean Vincent | FW | 1953–1961 | 22 | 46 | 0.48 |
| 14 | Jean Nicolas | FW | 1933–1938 | 21 | 25 | 0.84 |
| 15 | Paul Nicolas | FW | 1920–1931 | 20 | 35 | 0.57 |
| 15 | Eric Cantona | FW | 1987–1995 | 20 | 45 | 0.44 |
| 17 | Jean Baratte | FW | 1944–1952 | 19 | 32 | 0.59 |
| 18 | Roger Piantoni | FW | 1952–1961 | 18 | 37 | 0.49 |
| 18 | Raymond Kopa | MF | 1952–1962 | 18 | 45 | 0.4 |
| 20 | Franck Ribéry | MF | 2006–2014 | 16 | 81 | 0.2 |
| 20 | Laurent Blanc | DF | 1989–2000^{†} | 16 | 97 | 0.16 |
| 22 | Eugène Maës | FW | 1911–1913 | 15 | 11 | 1.36 |
| 22 | Hervé Revelli | FW | 1966–1975 | 15 | 30 | 0.5 |
| 22 | Dominique Rocheteau | FW | 1975–1986 | 15 | 49 | 0.31 |
| 25 | Émile Veinante | DF | 1929–1940 | 14 | 24 | 0.58 |
| 25 | Nicolas Anelka | FW | 1998–2010 | 14 | 69 | 0.2 |
| 25 | Robert Pires | MF | 1996–2004^{†} | 14 | 79 | 0.18 |
| 28 | Didier Six | MF | 1976–1984 | 13 | 52 | 0.25 |
| 28 | Ousmane Dembélé^{§} | FW | 2016–^{†} | 13 | 71 | 0.18 |
| 30 | Michael Olise^{§} | FW | 2024– | 12 | 31 | 0.39 |
| 30 | Maryan Wisnieski | FW | 1955–1963 | 12 | 33 | 0.36 |
| 30 | Bernard Lacombe | FW | 1973–1984 | 12 | 38 | 0.32 |
| 30 | Jules Dewaquez | FW | 1920–1929 | 12 | 41 | 0.29 |
| 34 | Thadée Cisowski | FW | 1951–1958 | 11 | 13 | 0.85 |
| 34 | Ernest Vaast | MF | 1945–1949 | 11 | 15 | 0.73 |
| 34 | Yannick Stopyra | FW | 1980–1988 | 11 | 33 | 0.33 |
| 34 | Paul Pogba | MF | 2013–2022^{†} | 11 | 91 | 0.12 |
| 37 | Charly Loubet | FW | 1967–1974 | 10 | 36 | 0.28 |
| 37 | Joseph Ujlaki | FW | 1952–1960 | 10 | 21 | 0.48 |
| 37 | Roger Courtois | FW | 1933–1947 | 10 | 22 | 0.45 |

== See also ==
- List of France international footballers
