= Dona Celeste =

Mother of Pelé and a Brazilian centenarian

- Born: 20 November 1922; Três Corações, Minas Gerais, Brazil
- Died: 21 June 2024 (aged 101); Santos, São Paulo, Brazil
- Occupation: Housewife
- Known for: Mother of Pelé
- Spouse: Dondinho (m. 1940; died 1996)
- Children: 3, including Pelé and Zoca

Celeste Arantes (20 November 1922 – 21 June 2024), better known as Dona Celeste, was the wife of the footballer Dondinho, and mother of another footballer Pelé.

== Biography ==
Born in Três Corações, Minas Gerais, Celeste married Dondinho while he was playing for Atlético Clube Três Corações, and with him she had three children: Edson (Pelé), Jair (Zoca) and Maria Lúcia. Celeste was always against the idea of her children following a career as footballers, as she understood how difficult it was to move from place to place all the time. She outlived Pelé by nearly two years, dying at the age of 101. She had been in a vegetative state since 2019.

She is also embodied as a character in Mauricio de Sousa's comic strips Pelezinho.
