= Edinho (footballer, born 1970) =

Brazilian football manager (born 1970)

Personal information
- Birth name: Edson Cholbi do Nascimento
- Date of birth: 27 August 1970 (age 56)
- Place of birth: Santos, São Paulo, Brazil
- Height: 1.78 m (5 ft 10 in)
- Position: Goalkeeper

Youth career
- Santos

Senior career*
| Years | Team | Apps | (Gls) |
| 1990–1991 | Santos | 24 | (2) |
| 1991–1992 | Portuguesa Santista | 64 | (0) |
| 1992–1993 | São Caetano | 54 | (0) |
| 1994–1998 | Santos | 123 | (5) |
| 1998–1999 | Ponte Preta | | |
| Total | | 200 | (7) |

Managerial career
- 2007–2015: Santos (assistant)
- 2015: Mogi Mirim
- 2016: Água Santa
- 2017: Tricordiano
- 2020–2021: Santos U23
- 2021–2022: Londrina U20
- 2022: Londrina (interim)
- 2023: Londrina
- * Club domestic league appearances and goals

Edson Cholbi do Nascimento (born 27 August 1970), commonly known as Edinho, is a Brazilian football manager and former player who played as a goalkeeper. He is a son of Pelé.

== Playing career ==
Edinho played for four clubs, Santos, Portuguesa Santista, São Caetano and Ponte Preta before retiring from professional football in 1999, at the age of 29. He scored 7 career goals as a goalkeeper, scoring all of them while at Santos.

His greatest achievement was playing in the Santos side that finished runner-up in the Série A in 1995.

== Post-playing career ==
Edinho was hired as Santos' goalkeeping coach on 9 February 2007. Until 2015, he was the team's assistant coach.

On 13 April 2015, Edinho was announced as manager of Mogi Mirim, but was dismissed on 31 May. He was named in charge of Água Santa on 27 May 2016, but resigned on 19 September.

On 14 October 2016, Edinho took over his father's hometown club Tricordiano for the ensuing campaign, but was relieved from his duties the following 8 February, after only two official matches.

On 1 November 2019, Edinho returned to Santos as a development coordinator. In October of the following year, he was named manager of the under-23s.

In 2021, Edinho arrived at Londrina to coach the under-20 team. He was an interim head coach of the first team in 2022, after the dismissal of Vinícius Eutrópio, and was permanently appointed head coach ahead of the 2023 season. On 5 February 2023, however, he resigned after only one win in seven matches.

== Personal life ==
Edinho is the son of football legend Pelé with his first wife Rosemeri Cholbi, who is of Brazilian-Argentinian background. Pelé's second son and Edson's half-brother Joshua was also a footballer; a forward, he too played for Santos' youth setup.

Edinho was also close friends with late Brazilian forward Dener, whom he had called hours before his death.

=== Legal problems ===
In 2005, he was arrested for money laundering and drug trafficking. He appealed the sentence and was allowed to remain free during his appeal. In 2014, he was given a 33-year sentence for the charges but adamantly denies any involvement. A court reduced the sentence to 12 years and 10 months, but Edinho must serve his sentence in jail.

In 2017, Edinho started to serve his sentence in prison, but was given the semi-open regime in the following year. In September 2019, he was given the open regime.
