= Pelezinho (comics) =

Brazilian comic book series

- Cover of the first issue published in 1977.

Publication information
- Publisher: Editora Abril
- Schedule: monthly
- Publication date: 1977 - 1986
- No. of issues: 54 (+ 8 almanacs)
- Main character(s): Pelezinho; Cana Braba; Frangão; Bonga; Jão Balão

Pelezinho is a Brazilian comic book series created by Mauricio de Sousa based on soccer star Pelé in his childhood. The character was created in 1976 from conversations between Mauricio and Pelé to create a character to better promote the player who at the time had just become a phenomenon for the Brazil national team. The characters were suggested by Pelé himself, based on childhood memories.

The comic was published from August 1977 to December 1986, totaling 66 issues released, and after that the character was no longer used for a long time, except in some special comics. On the other hand, in addition to him, several other football stars have also been created by Mauricio, as well as Pelezinho, as well as children's versions such as Dieguito (based on Diego Maradona), Ronaldo Fenômeno, Ronaldinho Gaúcho and Neymar. It was only in June 2012 that the character was used again with the republication of the old comics.

== Publication history ==
In the 70's, after many difficult negotiations between Mauricio de Sousa and Pelé, finally there was an understanding. The idea of the creator of Monica and Friends was that the character being a child, contrary to Pelé's desire, who imagined an adult version. Mauricio de Sousa's arguments prevailed, which included the assertion that the continuity of the Pelé's brand would be guaranteed if it involved children. From then on, Mauricio received information based on Pelé's childhood experiences to create the other characters. Thus, in October 1976, it was first released through newspaper strips on Folha de S. Paulo sharing space with Jimmy Five, Blu and Lionel's Kingdom comic strips. Later, in August 1977, his magazine was launched, in addition to his almanacs, by the publisher Abril, together with the Monica magazines. From then on, success was not limited to the comics published in Brazil and other countries, as Pelezinho became a doll and stamped on the packaging of the most varied products, from food to sporting goods, to various types of toys.

The issue 58, released in May 1982, was Pelezinho's last magazine. Even so, the almanacs with republications of the best stories and strips continued until December 1986. There were eight issues, in addition to two special editions that commemorated the arrival of the second World Cup in Mexico that year.

As of January 1987, all of Mauricio de Sousa's comics began to be published by the publisher Globo, except Pelezinho, which had its publication closed. However, it was published by the publisher Almanaque a special edition in honor of Pelé's 50th birthday. The following year Pelezinho got a new almanac on Globo with a selection of old stories, which was discontinued after the first issue.

In 1990 the character reappeared three times. First, in issue 7 of the series of comic strips As Melhores Piadas in pocket format (in which each issue was starred by a different character created by Mauricio de Sousa). Then in the 1990 FIFA World Cup came a comic book with only unpublished stories (in one of which there was a crossover between Pelezinho and Pelé). And finally, Pelezinho Especial – 50 Anos de Pelé, a giant-size edition with more than 200 pages.

Redesign used in the last editions published between 2013 and 2014 and in the Discovery Kids animation, notably adding a nose to the character and changing the circle around the mouth for small lips

In June 2012, Mauricio de Sousa confirmed the return of publication of Turma do Pelezinho by Panini Comics and announced that he plans to do a project along the same lines with Neymar. In 2013, Neymar's magazine is launched, soon after, Maurício de Sousa Produções decided to change the look of Pelezinho, digitally removing the "blackface" characteristics in comic book art starting with issue number 8, in the 90s Mauricio had already shown interest in returning the character and removing the character's blackface and making a grown-up version showing him as a pre-teen, but the project was never taken forward, according to Panini "the art was re-studied to become more modern, updated and universal".

== Characters ==
- Pelezinho - The titular character, being Pelé as a child. He is the captain and best player on his team. Sometimes he is seen to have great strength for his age mostly for his kicks, even stronger than an adult.
- Cana Braba - Pelezinho's best friend. A fat boy with a short temper, he is most often seen fighting with his friends and swearing. Just like Pelezinho, he has a very high strength for his age.
- Frangão - The unlucky goalkeeper of the team. He is a very tall and red haired boy. He often suffers from the goals that Pelezinho scores and is rarely seen catching a ball.
- Bonga - A chubby girl who is often seen flirting the boys for kisses and shows that cares about receiving attention. Usually Cana Braba is seen as her main boyfriend. She has white curly hair and is always wearing lipstick and high heels.
- Samira - A girl of Arab descent who often makes kibbeh that her friends hate to eat. She is Bonga's best friend.
- Neusinha - A Japanese-Brazilian girl that is Pelezinho's girlfriend. She is the daughter of a greengrocer who disapproves of his daughter dating Pelezinho. The character was based on Neuza Kitizo Uyheara, known for being Pelé's first girlfriend.
- Rex - Pelezinho's anthropomorphic pet dog. He's a yellow dog that oftens is seen walking in two feet and sometimes holding a shovel. He's like Blu's equivalent in the comics, but unlike him he never speaks, even in his own stories.
- Teófilo - Athletic and calm, another friend of Pelezinho. He was sometimes shown as Samira's boyfriend.
- Seu Dondinho - Pelezinho's father who was also a soccer player. Based on Pelé's real father Dondinho.
- Dona Celeste - Pelezinho's mother and Dondinho's wife.
- Jão Balão - Pelezinho's biggest rival and the main antagonist of the comic. He's always seen creating plans to defeat Pelezinho (similar to Jimmy Five against Monica), but he always lose at the end of the stories.
- Zé - Jão Balão's clumsy friend and henchman for his plans against Pelezinho.
- Zé Gordão - A huge fat boy friend of Pelezinho and his gang, he makes a few appearances.

== Animation ==
In 2014 an animated series of 13 episodes of 2 minutes titled Pelezinho: Planeta Futebol (lit. Pelezinho: Soccer Planet) debuted on Discovery Kids during the time of the 2014 FIFA World Cup. The animation focuses on educational stories about the culture of the countries that competed during the cup.

== Legacy ==
Pelezinho is considered one of the great classics of Brazilian comics and creations by Mauricio de Sousa. The comic's success inspired the creation of other fictional characters based on Brazilian celebrities adapted as children like Senninha (based on Ayrton Senna), Oscarzinho (based on Oscar Schmidt), Xuxinha (based on Xuxa), Aninha (based on Ana Maria Braga), Didizinho (based on Renato Aragão's character Didi), as well as other characters based on popular footballers created by Mauricio like Ronaldinho Gaúcho and Neymar Jr. in the 2000s and 2010s. Mauricio also intended to make a series based on Diego Maradona in the 80s entitled Dieguito, but the project was canceled.

After Pelé's death, Mauricio de Sousa made an art in tribute showing Pelezinho playing alongside the adult Pelé. In 2022, Pelezinho was ranked as Mauricio de Sousa's second-best character based on a football player, ahead of Neymar Jr. and behind Ronaldinho Gaúcho.
