= List of international goals scored by Pelé =

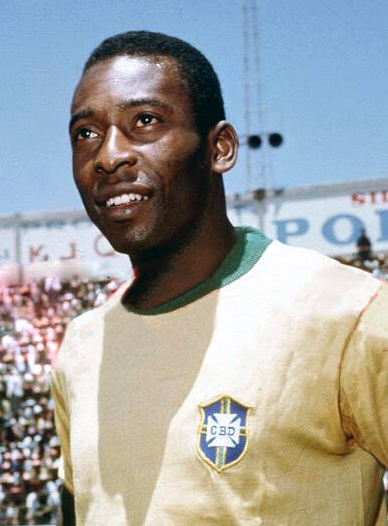
Pelé scored 77 goals in 92 international appearances for Brazil.

Pelé was a Brazilian professional footballer who represented the Brazil national football team as a forward from 1957 to 1971. Throughout his career, Pelé scored 77 goals in 92 (Note: This includes a match for Brazil against the rest of the world, which FIFA does not recognise, played for the 10th anniversary of their first World Cup title.) international appearances. (Note: The Brazilian Football Confederation claim Pelé scored 95 goals in 113 international appearances. They recognise the 22 matches played by the Brazilian national football team during the 1960s and 70s against club sides, in which Pelé scored 18 goals, while FIFA does not.) He remained Brazil's top goalscorer for over 60 years, before being surpassed by Neymar in 2023. Pelé made his debut for Brazil in a 2–1 defeat against Argentina on 7 July 1957. In that same match, he scored his first international goal aged 16 years and eight months, and remains Brazil's youngest ever goalscorer. Pelé scored seven international hat-tricks, which is still the most of any Brazilian player.

Pelé scored 12 goals in 14 FIFA World Cup appearances spanning four separate World Cups. As of the most recent edition, he is the only footballer to have won three World Cups (Note: The 1958, 1962 and 1970 editions) and is one of only five players, the others being Uwe Seeler, Miroslav Klose, Cristiano Ronaldo, and Lionel Messi, to have scored in four separate ones. At the 1958 FIFA World Cup, Pelé was at the time the youngest player to participate in a World Cup (Note: He was surpassed by Northern Ireland's Norman Whiteside at the 1982 FIFA World Cup.) and became the youngest scorer in a World Cup game. He also became the youngest footballer to score a hat-trick in a World Cup, doing so against France in the semifinal. In addition, Pelé achieved the distinction of being the youngest footballer to play in a World Cup final, where he scored two goals to help Brazil beat Sweden 5–2, and the youngest player to win a World Cup. He finished the tournament with six goals, behind a record-breaking Just Fontaine, and was named best young player of the tournament. Following the tournament, he was nicknamed O Rei (The King), and emerged as a worldwide black sporting star.

In the South American Football Championship, Pelé scored six goals in eight appearances, all during the 1959 edition. Although Brazil were runners-up, he was the top scorer and was named best player of the tournament. Pelé scored one goal in the 1962 FIFA World Cup and one in the 1966 edition. He played in six World Cup qualifying matches for the 1970 edition, scoring six goals, and netted four more at the tournament itself. Pelé scored his final international goal on 11 July 1971 against Austria, and made his final appearance for Brazil against Yugoslavia on 18 July 1971. Pelé is widely regarded as one of the greatest football players of all time and was among the most successful and popular sports figures of the 20th century. In 1999, he was named Athlete of the Century by the International Olympic Committee and included in the Time list of the 100 most important people of the 20th century, while, in 2000, he was voted the World Player of the Century by the International Federation of Football History & Statistics and was a joint winner of the FIFA Player of the Century award.

== Goals ==
Scores and results list Brazil's goal tally first, score column indicates score after each Pelé goal.

Table key
Indicates Brazil won the match
Indicates the match ended in a draw
Indicates Brazil lost the match

List of international goals scored by Pelé
No.	Cap	Date	Venue	Opponent	Score	Result	Competition	Ref.
1	1	7 July 1957	Maracanã Stadium, Rio de Janeiro, Brazil	Argentina	1–1	1–2	1957 Roca Cup	
2	2	10 July 1957	Pacaembu Stadium, São Paulo, Brazil	Argentina	1–0	2–0 (a.e.t.)	1957 Roca Cup	
3	3	4 May 1958	Maracanã Stadium, Rio de Janeiro, Brazil	Paraguay	4–1	5–1	1958 Taça Oswaldo Cruz	
4	5	18 May 1958	Pacaembu Stadium, São Paulo, Brazil	Bulgaria	2–1	3–1	Friendly	
5	5	18 May 1958	Pacaembu Stadium, São Paulo, Brazil	Bulgaria	3–1	3–1	Friendly	
6	7	19 June 1958	Ullevi, Gothenburg, Sweden	Wales	1–0	1–0	1958 FIFA World Cup	
7	8	24 June 1958	Råsunda Stadium, Solna, Sweden	France	3–1	5–2	1958 FIFA World Cup	
8	8	24 June 1958	Råsunda Stadium, Solna, Sweden	France	4–1	5–2	1958 FIFA World Cup	
9	8	24 June 1958	Råsunda Stadium, Solna, Sweden	France	5–1	5–2	1958 FIFA World Cup	
10	9	29 June 1958	Råsunda Stadium, Solna, Sweden	Sweden	3–1	5–2	1958 FIFA World Cup final	
11	9	29 June 1958	Råsunda Stadium, Solna, Sweden	Sweden	5–2	5–2	1958 FIFA World Cup final	
12	10	10 March 1959	Estadio Monumental, Buenos Aires, Argentina	Peru	2–0	2–2	1959 South American Football Championship	
13	11	15 March 1959	Estadio Monumental, Buenos Aires, Argentina	Chile	1–0	3–0	1959 South American Football Championship	
14	11	15 March 1959	Estadio Monumental, Buenos Aires, Argentina	Chile	2–0	3–0	1959 South American Football Championship	
15	12	21 March 1959	Estadio Monumental, Buenos Aires, Argentina	Bolivia	1–1	4–2	1959 South American Football Championship	
16	14	29 March 1959	Estadio Monumental, Buenos Aires, Argentina	Paraguay	1–1	4–1	1959 South American Football Championship	
17	14	29 March 1959	Estadio Monumental, Buenos Aires, Argentina	Paraguay	3–1	4–1	1959 South American Football Championship	
18	14	29 March 1959	Estadio Monumental, Buenos Aires, Argentina	Paraguay	4–1	4–1	1959 South American Football Championship	
19	15	4 April 1959	Estadio Monumental, Buenos Aires, Argentina	Argentina	1–1	1–1	1959 South American Football Championship	
20	17	17 September 1959	Maracanã Stadium, Rio de Janeiro, Brazil	Chile	1–0	7–0	1959 Copa Bernardo O'Higgins	
21	17	17 September 1959	Maracanã Stadium, Rio de Janeiro, Brazil	Chile	3–0	7–0	1959 Copa Bernardo O'Higgins	
22	17	17 September 1959	Maracanã Stadium, Rio de Janeiro, Brazil	Chile	4–0	7–0	1959 Copa Bernardo O'Higgins	
23	20	1 May 1960	Alexandria Stadium, Alexandria, Egypt	United Arab Republic	1–0	3–1	Friendly	
24	20	1 May 1960	Alexandria Stadium, Alexandria, Egypt	United Arab Republic	2–0	3–1	Friendly	
25	20	1 May 1960	Alexandria Stadium, Alexandria, Egypt	United Arab Republic	3–0	3–1	Friendly	
26	24	12 July 1960	Maracanã Stadium, Rio de Janeiro, Brazil	Argentina	2–1	5–1	1960 Taça do Atlântico	
27	25	21 April 1962	Maracanã Stadium, Rio de Janeiro, Brazil	Paraguay	2–0	6–0	1962 Taça Oswaldo Cruz	
28	26	24 April 1962	Estádio do Morumbi, São Paulo, Brazil	Paraguay	2–0	4–0	1962 Taça Oswaldo Cruz	
29	26	24 April 1962	Estádio do Morumbi, São Paulo, Brazil	Paraguay	3–0	4–0	1962 Taça Oswaldo Cruz	
30	28	9 May 1962	Maracanã Stadium, Rio de Janeiro, Brazil	Portugal	1–0	1–0	Friendly	
31	29	12 May 1962	Maracanã Stadium, Rio de Janeiro, Brazil	Wales	3–1	3–1	Friendly	
32	30	16 May 1962	Estádio do Morumbi, São Paulo, Brazil	Wales	2–1	3–1	Friendly	
33	30	16 May 1962	Estádio do Morumbi, São Paulo, Brazil	Wales	3–1	3–1	Friendly	
34	31	30 May 1962	Estadio Sausalito, Viña del Mar, Chile	Mexico	2–0	2–0	1962 FIFA World Cup	
35	34	16 April 1963	Maracanã Stadium, Rio de Janeiro, Brazil	Argentina	1–0	5–2 (a.e.t.)	1963 Roca Cup	
36	34	16 April 1963	Maracanã Stadium, Rio de Janeiro, Brazil	Argentina	3–1	5–2 (a.e.t.)	1963 Roca Cup	
37	34	16 April 1963	Maracanã Stadium, Rio de Janeiro, Brazil	Argentina	4–1	5–2 (a.e.t.)	1963 Roca Cup	
38	36	28 April 1963	Stade de Colombes, Paris, France	France	1–0	3–2	Friendly	
39	36	28 April 1963	Stade de Colombes, Paris, France	France	2–1	3–2	Friendly	
40	36	28 April 1963	Stade de Colombes, Paris, France	France	3–2	3–2	Friendly	
41	38	5 May 1963	Volksparkstadion, Hamburg, West Germany	West Germany	2–1	2–1	Friendly	
42	40	30 May 1964	Maracanã Stadium, Rio de Janeiro, Brazil	England	3–1	5–1	Taça das Nações	
43	42	30 May 1964	Maracanã Stadium, Rio de Janeiro, Brazil	Portugal	1–0	4–1	Taça das Nações	
44	43	2 June 1965	Maracanã Stadium, Rio de Janeiro, Brazil	Belgium	1–0	5–0	Friendly	
45	43	2 June 1965	Maracanã Stadium, Rio de Janeiro, Brazil	Belgium	2–0	5–0	Friendly	
46	43	2 June 1965	Maracanã Stadium, Rio de Janeiro, Brazil	Belgium	3–0	5–0	Friendly	
47	44	6 June 1965	Volksparkstadion, Hamburg, West Germany	West Germany	2–0	2–0	Friendly	
48	46	17 June 1965	Ahmed Zabana Stadium, Oran, Algeria	Algeria	1–0	3–0	Friendly	
49	48	30 June 1965	Råsunda Stadium, Solna, Sweden	Sweden	1–1	2–1	Friendly	
50	49	4 July 1965	Luzhniki Stadium, Moscow, Soviet Union	Soviet Union	1–0	3–0	Friendly	
51	49	4 July 1965	Luzhniki Stadium, Moscow, Soviet Union	Soviet Union	3–0	3–0	Friendly	
52	50	21 November 1965	Maracanã Stadium, Rio de Janeiro, Brazil	Soviet Union	2–0	2–2	Friendly	
53	52	4 June 1966	Estádio do Morumbi, São Paulo, Brazil	Peru	1–0	4–0	Friendly	
54	54	12 June 1966	Maracanã Stadium, Rio de Janeiro, Brazil	Czechoslovakia	1–0	2–1	Friendly	
55	54	12 June 1966	Maracanã Stadium, Rio de Janeiro, Brazil	Czechoslovakia	2–0	2–1	Friendly	
56	55	15 June 1966	Maracanã Stadium, Rio de Janeiro, Brazil	Czechoslovakia	1–0	2–2	Friendly	
57	58	12 July 1966	Goodison Park, Liverpool, England	Bulgaria	1–0	2–0	1966 FIFA World Cup	
58	60	25 July 1968	Estadio de Puerto Sajonia, Asunción, Paraguay	Paraguay	1–0	4–0	1968 Taça Oswaldo Cruz	
59	60	25 July 1968	Estadio de Puerto Sajonia, Asunción, Paraguay	Paraguay	2–0	4–0	1968 Taça Oswaldo Cruz	
60	63	3 November 1968	Mineirão, Belo Horizonte, Brazil	Mexico	2–0	2–1	Friendly	
61	66	17 December 1968	Maracanã Stadium, Rio de Janeiro, Brazil	Yugoslavia	2–2	3–3	Friendly	
62	68	9 April 1969	Maracanã Stadium, Rio de Janeiro, Brazil	Peru	1–2	3–2	Friendly	
63	71	10 August 1969	Estadio Olímpico de la UCV, Caracas, Venezuela	Venezuela	2–0	5–0	1970 FIFA World Cup qualification	
64	71	10 August 1969	Estadio Olímpico de la UCV, Caracas, Venezuela	Venezuela	5–0	5–0	1970 FIFA World Cup qualification	
65	73	21 August 1969	Maracanã Stadium, Rio de Janeiro, Brazil	Colombia	4–1	6–2	1970 FIFA World Cup qualification	
66	74	24 August 1969	Maracanã Stadium, Rio de Janeiro, Brazil	Venezuela	5–0	6–0	1970 FIFA World Cup qualification	
67	74	24 August 1969	Maracanã Stadium, Rio de Janeiro, Brazil	Venezuela	6–0	6–0	1970 FIFA World Cup qualification	
68	75	31 August 1969	Maracanã Stadium, Rio de Janeiro, Brazil	Paraguay	1–0	1–0	1970 FIFA World Cup qualification	
69	77	8 March 1970	Maracanã Stadium, Rio de Janeiro, Brazil	Argentina	2–1	2–1	Friendly	
70	78	22 March 1970	Estádio do Morumbi, São Paulo, Brazil	Chile	4–0	5–0	Friendly	
71	78	22 March 1970	Estádio do Morumbi, São Paulo, Brazil	Chile	5–0	5–0	Friendly	
72	83	3 June 1970	Estadio Jalisco, Guadalajara, Mexico	Czechoslovakia	2–1	4–1	1970 FIFA World Cup	
73	85	10 June 1970	Estadio Jalisco, Guadalajara, Mexico	Romania	1–0	3–2	1970 FIFA World Cup	
74	85	10 June 1970	Estadio Jalisco, Guadalajara, Mexico	Romania	3–1	3–2	1970 FIFA World Cup	
75	88	21 June 1970	Estadio Azteca, Mexico City, Mexico	Italy	1–0	4–1	1970 FIFA World Cup final	
76	90	4 October 1970	Estadio Nacional, Santiago, Chile	Chile	1–0	5–1	Friendly	
77	91	11 July 1971	Estádio do Morumbi, São Paulo, Brazil	Austria	1–0	1–1	Friendly	

== Hat-tricks ==
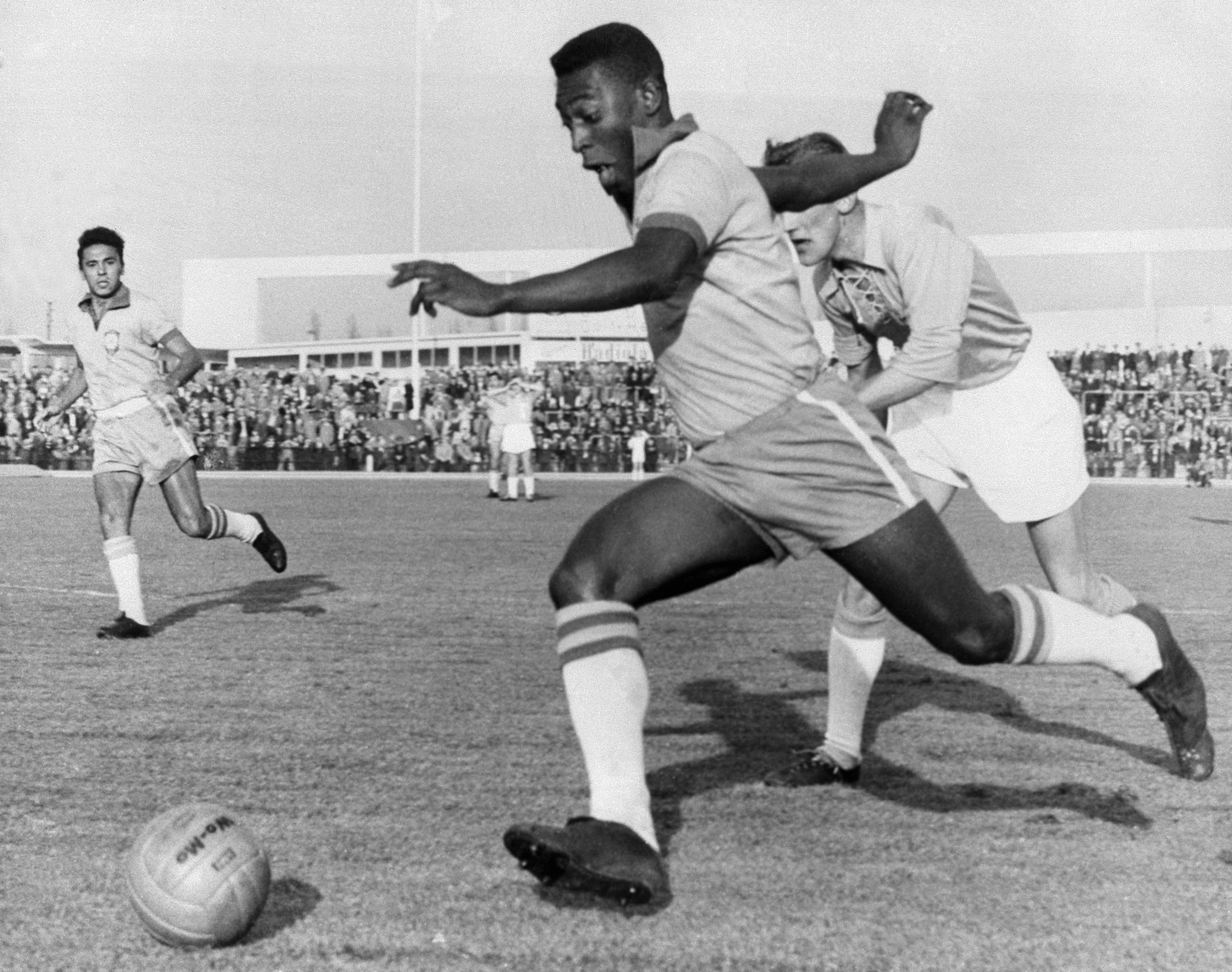
Pelé scored seven hat-tricks for Brazil.

List of international hat-tricks scored by Pelé
No.	Opponent	Goals	Score	Venue	Competition	Date	Ref.
1	France	3 – (3–1, 4–1, 5–1)	5–2	Råsunda Stadium, Solna, Sweden	1958 FIFA World Cup	24 June 1958	
2	Paraguay	3 – (1–1, 3–1, 4–1)	4–1	Estadio Monumental, Buenos Aires, Argentina	1959 South American Football Championship	29 March 1959	
3	Chile	3 – (1–0, 3–0, 4–0)	7–0	Maracanã Stadium, Rio de Janeiro, Brazil	1959 Copa Bernardo O'Higgins	17 September 1959	
4	United Arab Republic	3 – (1–0, 2–0, 3–0)	3–1	Alexandria Stadium, Alexandria, Egypt	Friendly	1 May 1960	
5	Argentina	3 – (1–0, 3–1, 4–1)	5–2	Maracanã Stadium, Rio de Janeiro, Brazil	1963 Roca Cup	16 April 1963	
6	France	3 – (1–0, 2–1, 3–2)	3–2	Stade de Colombes, Paris, France	Friendly	28 April 1963	
7	Belgium	3 – (1–0, 2–0, 3–0)	5–0	Maracanã Stadium, Rio de Janeiro, Brazil	Friendly	2 June 1965	

== Statistics ==
Appearances and goals by year
Year	Competitive		Friendly		Total	
Year	Apps	Goals	Apps	Goals	Apps	Goals
1957	2 (Note: Appearances in the Roca Cup)	2	—		2	2
1958	5 (Note: Four appearances and six goals in the 1958 FIFA World Cup, one appearance and one goal in the Taça Oswaldo Cruz)	7	2	2	7	9
1959	8 (Note: Six appearances and eight goals in the 1959 South American Football Championship, two appearances and three goals in the Copa Bernardo O'Higgins)	11	1	0	9	11
1960	2 (Note: Appearances in the Taça do Atlântico)	1	4	3	6	4
1961	—		—		0	0
1962	4 (Note: Two appearances and one goal in the 1962 FIFA World Cup, two appearances and three goals in the Taça Oswaldo Cruz)	4	4	4	8	8
1963	2	3	5	4	7	7
1964	3 (Note: Appearances in the Taça das Nações)	2	—		3	2
1965	—		8	9	8	9
1966	2 (Note: Appearances in the 1966 FIFA World Cup)	1	7	4	9	5
1967	—		—		0	0
1968	2 (Note: Appearances in the Taça Oswaldo Cruz)	2	5	2	7	4
1969	6 (Note: Appearances in the 1970 FIFA World Cup qualification)	6	3	1	9	7
1970	6 (Note: Appearances in the 1970 FIFA World Cup)	4	9	4	15	8
1971	—		2	1	2	1
Total	42	43	50	34	92	77

Goals by competition
Competition	Apps	Goals
Friendlies	50	34
FIFA World Cup	14	12
South American Football Championship	6	8
FIFA World Cup qualification	6	6
Taça Oswaldo Cruz	5	6
Roca Cup	4	5
Taça das Nações	3	2
Copa Bernardo O'Higgins	2	3
Taça do Atlântico	2	1
Total	92	77

Goals by opponent
Opponent	Goals
Paraguay	10
Argentina	8
Chile	8
France	6
Czechoslovakia	4
Venezuela	4
Wales	4
Belgium	3
Soviet Union	3
Sweden	3
United Arab Republic	3
Mexico	2
Peru	2
Portugal	2
Romania	2
West Germany	2
Algeria	1
Austria	1
Bolivia	1
Bulgaria	1
Colombia	1
England	1
Italy	1
Yugoslavia	1
Total	77
