= Zoca =

Brazilian footballer (1942–2020)

Personal information
- Full name: Jair Arantes do Nascimento
- Date of birth: 22 July 1942
- Place of birth: Três Corações, Minas Gerais, Brazil
- Date of death: 25 March 2020 (aged 77)
- Place of death: Santos, São Paulo, Brazil
- Height: 1.71 m (5 ft 7 in)
- Position: Forward

Youth career
- –1957: Noroeste

Senior career*
Years	Team	Apps	(Gls)
1957–1960	Portuguesa Santista	78	(67)
1960–1966	Santos	80	(46)

Managerial career
- 1979–1981: Manhattanville Valiants
- 1982: LIU Brooklyn Blackbirds (assistant)
- * Club domestic league appearances and goals

Jair Arantes do Nascimento (22 July 1942 – 25 March 2020), known as Zoca, was a Brazilian professional football coach and player who played as a forward. He was the brother of Pelé and son of Dondinho.

== Footballing career ==
Zoca was born in Três Corações, Minas Gerais, two years after his older brother, legendary Brazilian footballer Pelé. He grew up in the Bauru municipality in São Paulo state as a child, joining the youth academy of Noroeste in the 1950s. He moved to Santos, São Paulo, joining Portuguesa Santista, where he played for four seasons before following in his brother's footsteps and signing for Santos in 1960.

He made his debut for Santos on 10 April 1961, coming on as a substitute for Coutinho in a 6–1 win over America-RJ. In the last minute of the game, Santos won a penalty, and though he stepped up to take it, Zoca failed to convert from the spot. Between April and June 1962, with seven members of the Santos squad at the 1962 FIFA World Cup, Zoca was given a run in the squad for the Copa São Paulo. His first official goal for Santos came in this competition, scoring in a 2–1 loss to Corinthians de Presidente Prudente. In total, he scored 77 goals in 85 games for Santos (including matches with the reserve team, where he featured for the most part of his spell at the club), before retiring in 1966 to focus on supporting his brother's career.

== Later life and death ==
Zoca received degrees in marketing and law from the Catholic University of Santos and University of São Paulo, respectively. He worked as his brother's business manager during his time with the New York Cosmos.

In 1979, with Zoca looking to study English at the Manhattanville College in Purchase, New York, the athletic director of the college, Joe Daunic, reached out and offered him the chance to coach the college women's soccer team while he studied, in an attempt to improve his English by immersing himself. Initially reluctant, Zoca eventually agreed, going on to manage the side for three seasons. In 1982, he was the assistant of the Long Island University women's soccer team.

Zoca died on 25 March 2020, after suffering with prostate cancer.
