= Cruyff turn =

Dribbling move in football

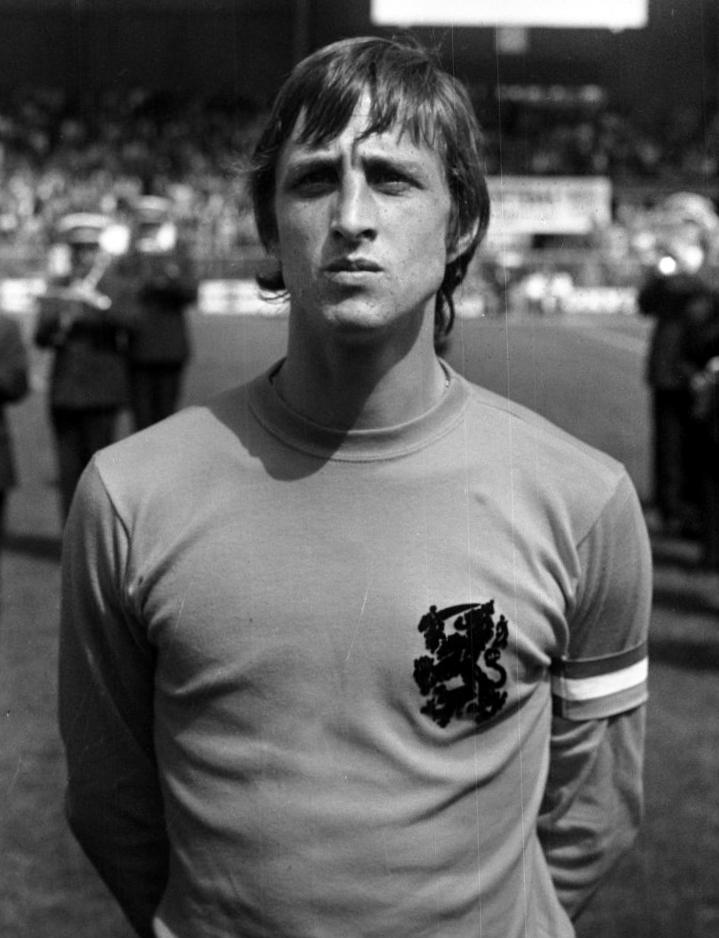
Johan Cruyff and his only World Cup tournament (1974)

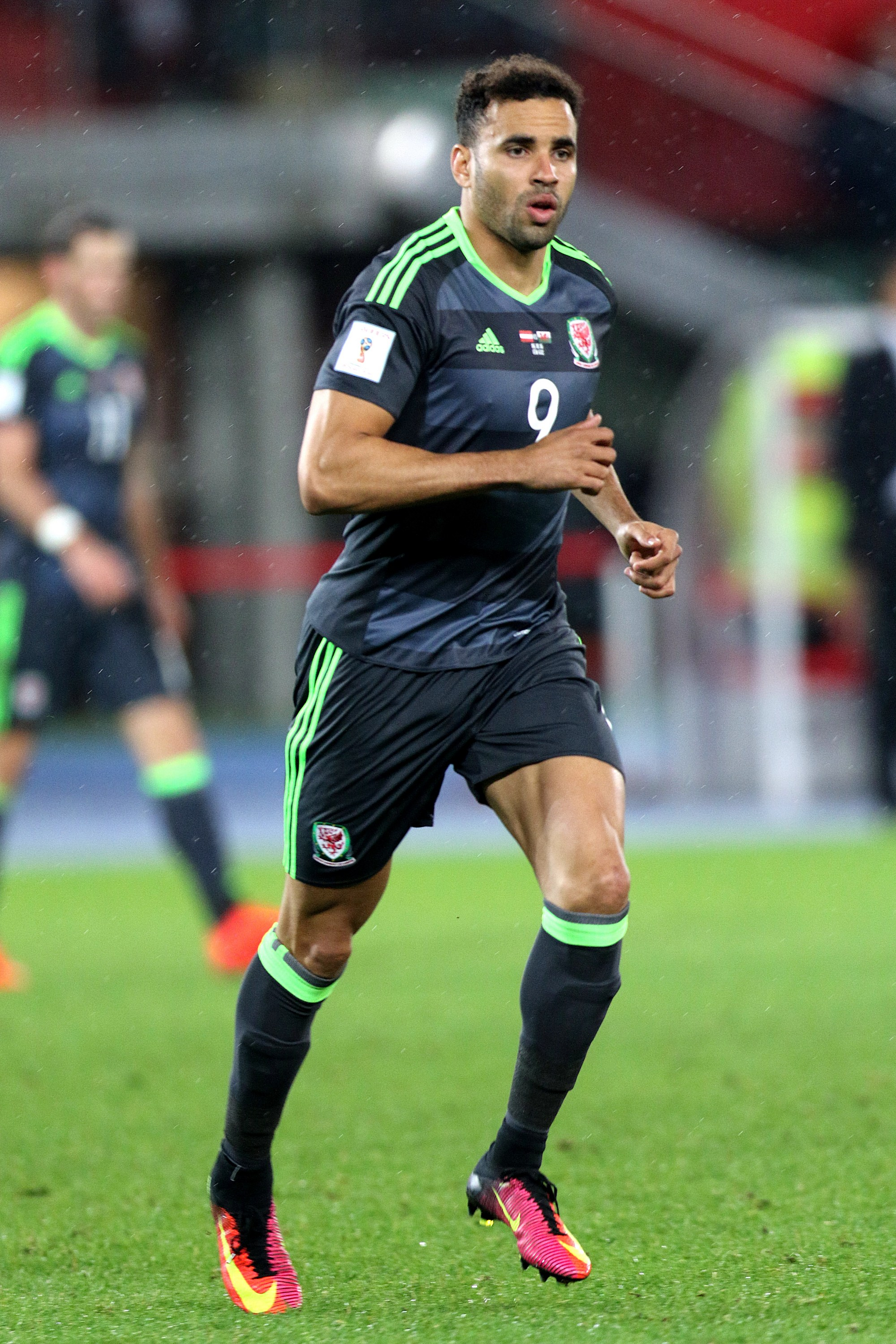
Hal Robson-Kanu used a Cruyff turn to score in Wales' historic quarter-final victory over Belgium at UEFA Euro 2016.

The Cruyff turn is an evasive dribbling move used in football, and named after Dutch player Johan Cruyff.

In the 22nd minute of the game against Sweden in the group stage of the 1974 World Cup, while Cruyff had control of the ball in an attacking position and being guarded tightly by Swedish defender Jan Olsson, Cruyff feigned a pass before dragging the ball behind his standing leg, turning 180 degrees, and accelerating away. With its simplicity, effectiveness and unpredictability, the Cruyff turn remains one of the most commonly recognized dribbling moves in modern football.

The fact that the feint was named after Cruyff, however, does not mean that Cruyff was the first to perform this move. Just like with most evasive dribbles, feints and tricks, the first footballer to perform it, is almost always impossible to trace down. Pele, for example, performed the trick in 1960 (vs Juventus).

== See also ==
- Marseille turn
- Pelé runaround move
