= Runaround move =

Move in football

The runaround move is a football move designed to get around an opponent, made famous by Pelé during the 1970 World Cup. It involves allowing a dribble or a pass from a teammate to run past an opponent, then sprinting around the opponent to continue the attack.

== History ==
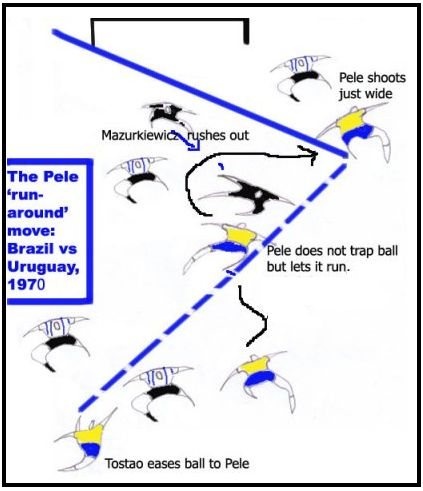

The move was demonstrated by Brazilian footballer Pelé during the 1970 FIFA World Cup match against Uruguay. In the second half, Brazilian centre-forward Tostão played a through pass to Pelé as a counter-attack started. Sprinting up the middle, Pelé was immediately confronted with the Uruguayan goalkeeper Ladislao Mazurkiewicz who came off his line quickly. Pelé got there first and fooled Mazurkiewicz by not touching the ball, causing it to roll to the goalkeeper's left, while Pelé went to the goalkeeper's right. Circling the goalkeeper to collect, Pelé shot while turning towards the goal, but he turned too much while shooting, and the ball drifted just wide of the far post.

Pelé's move is a variant of the "selling the dummy" feint – letting the ball go around a defender then also circling the opponent, rather than following the straight path of a pass or loose ball, and can be useful in tight situations. It is discussed in Scientific Soccer of the Seventies by soccer historian Kenneth MacDonald, who also discusses Pelé's contribution in Brazil's 1970 World Cup victory in detail. This "runaround" move is mentioned in official FIFA World Cup Technical Reports as "audaciously executed, and called for immense skill, timing, judgment and speed."

Swedish player Jesper Blomqvist managed to perform a variant of the runaround move with more success, adding a fake, that resulted in a goal when his IFK Göteborg played Helsingborgs IF in the Allsvenskan in 1995. Blomqvist relied more on deception than Pelé. Whereas the Brazilian had to move with utmost speed to avoid Mazurkiewicz, Blomqvist had more time and used a deceptive shuffling of the feet. Receiving an excellent through pass, the Swede confused the approaching keeper – letting the ball run – and faking left, while sprinting right, around his opponent. He collected the ball on the other side and finished with an easy goal. As demonstrated by both Blomqvist and Pelé, the runaround move can thus work in "emergency" situations where speed and split-second timing are all, or where there is more time and space to fake out an opponent. In both scenarios, it can lead to spectacular results.

== See also ==
- Cruyff turn
- Dummy/feint
- Marseille turn
- Nutmeg (association football)
- Seal dribble
- Step over
