= Pelé =

Brazilian footballer (1940–2022)

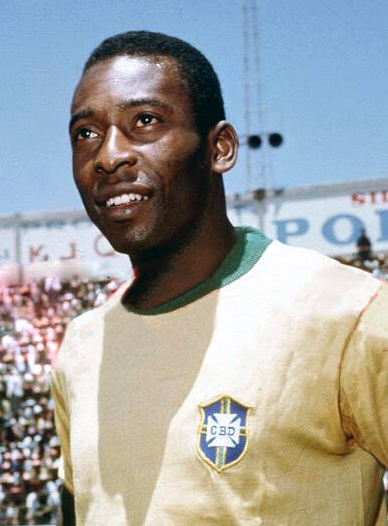
- Pelé with Brazil in 1970
- Born: Edson Arantes do Nascimento; 23 October 1940 (Note: According to Pelé, his birth certificate listed 21 October 1940 incorrectly.); Três Corações, Minas Gerais, Brazil
- Died: 29 December 2022 (aged 82); São Paulo, Brazil
- Resting place: Memorial Necrópole Ecumênica, Santos, São Paulo
- Education: Metropolitan University of Santos (UNIMES)
- Occupations: Footballer; humanitarian
- Height: 1.73 m (5 ft 8 in)
- Spouses: Rosemeri dos Reis Cholbi (m. 1966; div. 1982) Assíria Lemos Seixas (m. 1994; div. 2008) Marcia Aoki (m. 2016)
- Children: 7, including Edinho and Joshua Nascimento
- Parents: Dondinho (father); Dona Celeste (mother)
- Relatives: Zoca (brother)
Association football career
- Position: Forward
Youth career
- 1953–1956: Bauru
Senior career*
Years	Team	Apps	(Gls)
1956–1974	Santos	583	(569)
1975–1977	New York Cosmos	64	(37)
Total		647	(606)
International career
1957–1971	Brazil	92 (Note: This includes a match for Brazil against the rest of the world, which FIFA does not recognise, played for the 10th anniversary of their first World Cup title)	(77)
Medal record
Men's football
Representing Brazil
FIFA World Cup
Winner	1958
Winner	1962
Winner	1970
South American Championship
Runner-up	1959
Third place	1959
- * Club domestic league appearances and goals

1st Minister of Sports
- In office 1 January 1995 – 29 April 1998
- President: Fernando Henrique Cardoso
- Preceded by: Office established
- Succeeded by: Rafael Greca (Sports and Tourism)

Edson Arantes do Nascimento (Note: Brazilian Portuguese pronunciation: [ˈɛd(ʒi)sõ(w) aˈɾɐ̃tʃiz du nasiˈmẽtu].) (23 October 1940 – 29 December 2022), better known by his nickname Pelé, (Note: Brazilian Portuguese pronunciation: [peˈlɛ].) was a Brazilian professional footballer who played as a forward. Widely regarded as one of the greatest players in history, he was among the most successful and popular sports figures of the 20th century. (Note: Attributed to multiple references:) His 1,279 goals in 1,363 games, which includes exhibition games, is recognised as a Guinness World Record. In 1999, he was named Athlete of the Century by the International Olympic Committee and was included in the Time list of the 100 most important people of the 20th century. In 2000, Pelé was voted World Player of the Century by the International Federation of Football History & Statistics (IFFHS) and was one of the two joint winners of the FIFA Player of the Century, alongside Diego Maradona.

Pelé began playing for the Brazilian club Santos at age 15, and for the Brazil national team at 16. During his international career, he won three FIFA World Cup titles – in 1958, 1962, and 1970 – becoming the only player to do so and the youngest to win a World Cup, at just 17 years old. He was nicknamed "O Rei" ("the King") following the 1958 World Cup. With 77 goals in 92 games for Brazil, Pelé held the record as the national team's top goalscorer for over fifty years. At club level, Pelé is Santos' all-time top goalscorer with 643 goals in 659 games. In a golden era for Santos, Pelé led the club to victory at the 1962 and 1963 Copa Libertadores and at the 1962 and 1963 Intercontinental Cup.

Credited with connecting the phrase "The Beautiful Game" with football, Pelé's tremendous skill and penchant for spectacular goals made him a global star, and his teams toured internationally to take full advantage of his popularity. During his playing days, Pelé was for a period the highest-paid athlete in the world. After retiring in 1977, he was a worldwide ambassador for football and undertook acting and commercial ventures. In 2010, he was named the honorary president of the New York Cosmos.

Pelé averaged almost a goal per game throughout his career and could strike the ball with either foot. While predominantly a striker, he could also be a playmaker, providing assists with his vision and passing ability. In Brazil, he was hailed as a national hero for his accomplishments in football and for his outspoken support of policies to benefit the poor. His emergence at the 1958 World Cup, where he became a Black global sporting star, was a source of inspiration. Throughout his career and in his retirement, Pelé received numerous individual and team awards for his performance on the field, his record-breaking achievements, and his legacy in the sport.

== Early life ==
Pelé was born Edson Arantes do Nascimento on 23 October 1940 in Três Corações, Minas Gerais, Brazil. He was the son of Fluminense footballer Dondinho (born João Ramos do Nascimento) and Celeste Arantes. He had a younger brother, Zoca, who would also play for Santos. Pelé was named after the American inventor Thomas Edison. His parents decided to remove the "i" and call him "Edson", but there was an error on his birth certificate, leading many documents to show his name as "Edison". He was called "Edson" by his family, who also gave him the nickname "Dico". On the origin of his nickname "Pelé", he said it probably emerged after he mispronounced the name of his favourite player, Bilé, a goalkeeper for Vasco da Gama. In his 2006 autobiography, Pelé said he had no idea what the name meant, nor did his school friends.

Pelé grew up in poverty in Bauru, São Paulo, and earned money by working as a server in tea shops. Taught to play football by his father, he could not afford a ball and usually played with either a grapefruit or a sock stuffed with newspaper. He played for several amateur teams in his youth, including Sete de Setembro, Canto do Rio, São Paulinho, and Ameriquinha. Pelé led Bauru Atlético Clube juniors, coached by Waldemar de Brito, to two São Paulo state youth championships. In his mid-teens, a type of indoor football called futsal was becoming popular in Bauru, and Pelé played for a futsal team called Radium. He played in the first futsal competition in the region, and his team won the first championship and several others.

According to Pelé, the gameplay of futsal was much quicker than football on grass, and players had to think faster because everyone was close to each other on the pitch. He credits futsal for helping him think better on the spot. In addition, futsal allowed him to play with adults when he was about 14 years old. In one of the tournaments he played in, he was initially considered too young to play, but ultimately became the top scorer with 14 or 15 goals. "That gave me a lot of confidence", Pelé said. "I knew then not to be afraid of whatever might come". Pelé named Brazilian playmaker Zizinho among his inspirations growing up.

== Club career ==
=== Santos ===
==== 1956–1962: Early years with Santos and being declared a national treasure ====
In 1956, Waldemar de Brito took Pelé to Santos, an industrial port city located near São Paulo, to try out for the professional club Santos FC. He told the club's directors that the 15-year-old would be "the greatest football player in the world". Pelé impressed Santos coach Lula during his trial at the Estádio Vila Belmiro, and he signed a professional contract with the club in June 1956. Pelé was highly promoted in the local media as a future superstar. He made his senior team debut on 7 September 1956 at the age of 15 against Corinthians de Santo André and had an impressive performance in a 7–1 victory, scoring the first goal in his prolific career during the match.

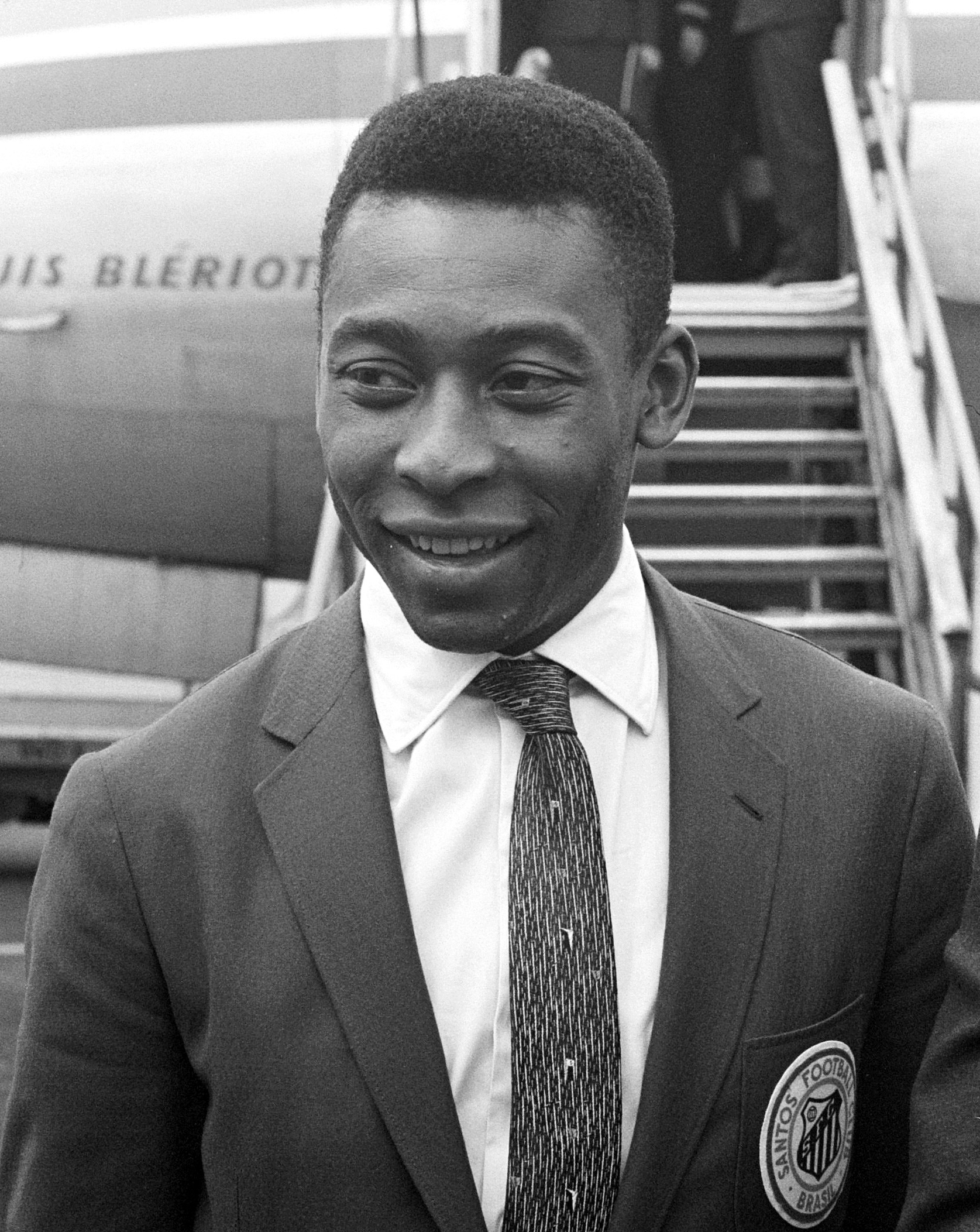
Pelé with Santos in October 1962. By this time, he was ranked as the best football player in the world.

When the 1957 season started, Pelé was given a starting place on the Santos senior team. At the age of 16, he became the top scorer in their league, the Campeonato Paulista. In 1958, Pelé helped the team win the Campeonato Paulista trophy, his first major title with the team. He again finished the season as the league's top scorer, with 58 goals, a record that still stands today. A year later, he helped Santos earn their first victory in the Torneio Rio-São Paulo. Ten months after signing professionally, Pelé was called up to the Brazil national team. After the 1958 World Cup, wealthy European clubs, such as Real Madrid, Juventus and Manchester United, tried to sign him in vain. In 1958, Inter Milan managed to get him a contract, but the club's owner Angelo Moratti tore it up at the request of Santos's chairman following a revolt by Santos's fans. Valencia CF arranged an agreement that would have brought Pelé to the club after the 1958 World Cup, but after his performances at the tournament, Santos declined to let him leave.

During the 1960 season, Pelé scored 34 goals as Santos regained the Campeonato Paulista trophy. During the 1961 season, Pelé scored 47 goals as his team won both the Campeonato Paulista and the Taça Brasil. The Taça victory allowed Santos to participate in the Copa Libertadores, the most prestigious club tournament in the Western hemisphere. In 1961, the government of Brazil under President Jânio Quadros declared Pelé an "official national treasure" to prevent him from being transferred out of the country.

==== 1962–1965: Copa Libertadores success ====
Santos's most successful Copa Libertadores season started in 1962. They defeated Universidad Católica in the semi-finals and triumphed 3–0 over defending champions Peñarol in the finals. Pelé scored twice in the final match, and was the second top scorer of the competition with four goals. That same year, Santos successfully defended the Campeonato Paulista with 37 goals from Pelé, as well as the Taça Brasil. Santos also won the 1962 Intercontinental Cup against Benfica. Pelé produced one of the best performances of his career, scoring a hat-trick in Lisbon as Santos won 5–2. Following the match, Benfica goalkeeper Costa Pereira remarked, "I arrived hoping to stop a great man, but I went away convinced I had been undone by someone who was not born on the same planet as the rest of us."

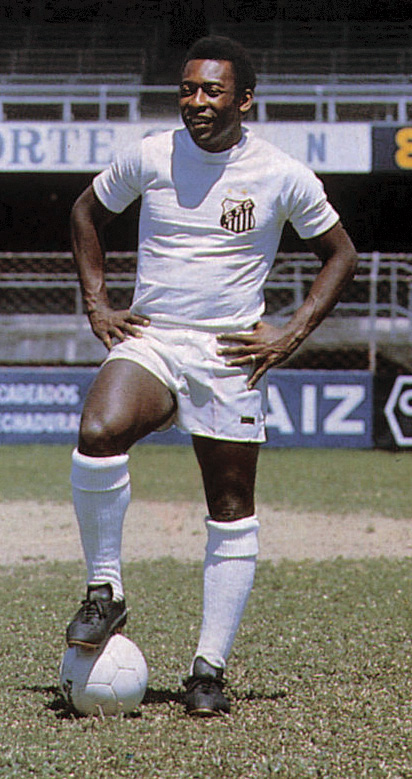
Pelé, shown before he faced Boca Juniors during the 1963 Copa Libertadores Finals at La Bombonera

Pelé said his most memorable goal was scored against Clube Atlético Juventus on 2 August 1959. As there is no video footage of this match, Pelé asked that a computer animation be made of this specific goal. In March 1961, Santos played against Fluminense at the Maracanã stadium. Near the end of the first half, Pelé received the ball on the edge of his own penalty area, then ran the length of the field, eluding opposing players with feints, before striking the ball beyond the goalkeeper. According to the newspaper O Globo, Pelé's goal earned him a two-minute standing ovation from the crowd, including Fluminense fans. Several days later, a plaque was mounted on the wall of the stadium with a dedication to "the most beautiful goal in the history of the Maracanã". The goal became known as the gol de placa, "the goal of the plaque". Over the years, this phrase found its way into Brazilian footballing vocabulary as a way to describe a remarkable goal worthy of commemoration.

As the defending champions, Santos qualified automatically to the semi-final stage of the 1963 Copa Libertadores. They overcame a Botafogo team that featured the Brazilian superstars Garrincha and Jairzinho, and with five goals from Pelé throughout the tournament, Santos claimed the title once again. Santos lost the Campeonato Paulista after finishing in third place, but went on to win the Rio-São Paulo tournament. Pelé also helped Santos retain the Intercontinental Cup and the Taça Brasil.

Santos was eliminated from the 1964 Copa Libertadores in the semi-finals by Independiente, but managed to win the 1964 Campeonato Paulista, with Pelé scoring 34 goals. The club won the Taça Brasil for the fourth consecutive year and shared the 1964 Rio-São Paulo title with Botafogo. Pelé was the top scorer of the 1965 Copa Libertadores with eight goals, although Santos was eliminated by Peñarol.

==== 1965–1974: O Milésimo and final years with Santos ====
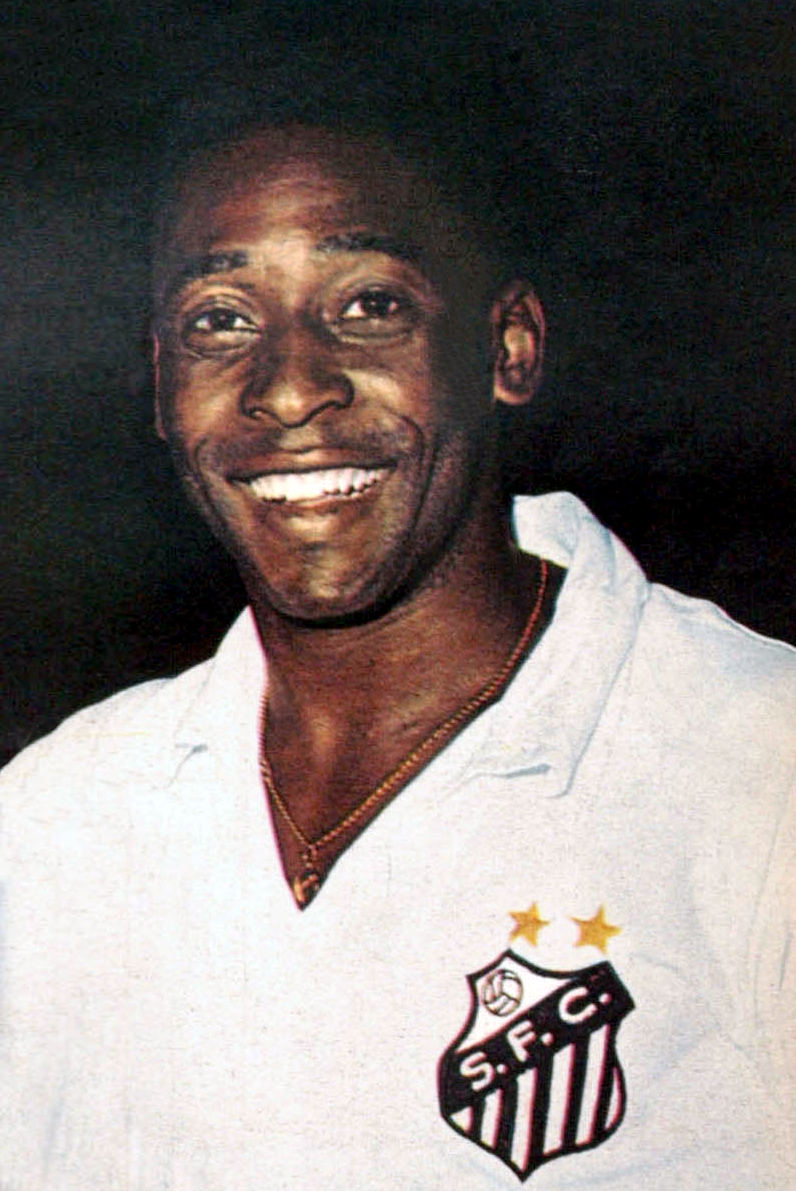
Pelé with Santos in 1965

In December 1965, Santos won the Taça Brasil, their fifth straight Brazilian league title. The following year, the club failed to retain the Taça Brasil, but won the Campeonato Paulista in 1967, 1968, and 1969. On 19 November 1969, Pelé scored his 1,000th goal in all competitions, in what was a highly anticipated moment in Brazil. The goal, dubbed O Milésimo, "The Thousandth", occurred when Pelé scored from a penalty kick against Vasco da Gama at the Maracanã Stadium.

Various sources have said that the 2 factions involved in the Nigerian Civil War agreed to a 48-hour ceasefire in 1969 so they could watch Pelé play an exhibition game in Lagos. An early source for this story was Ebony magazine in 1975. Santos played to a 2–2 draw with the Lagos team Stationary Stores FC, with Pelé scoring his team's goals; the civil war continued for another year after the game. In his autobiography, Pelé said he was unsure if there was a ceasefire, but said there was increased security at the game. Some sources, including Santos's website, say that the ceasefire was instead for an exhibition game in Benin City. Local researchers have not found any contemporary reports of the Lagos ceasefire.

During his time with Santos, Pelé played alongside many celebrated players, including Zito, Pepe, and Coutinho. He partnered with Coutinho in numerous one-two plays, attacks, and goals. During international tours with Santos, Pelé played exhibition games in various countries. He played in Spain against Real Madrid and Barcelona, in Italy against Juventus, Inter Milan, AC Milan and AS Roma, in Egypt against Al Ahly, and in Kuwait against Qadsia. In Kuwait, he met the Egyptian film star Zubaida Tharwat, and reportedly wanted to marry her and take her back with him to Brazil. (Note: Attributed to multiple references:) In 1971, Pelé declined an offer to sign with Paris Saint-Germain, an emerging club in France at the time.

At the end of 1974, Pelé retired from Brazilian club football during his 19th season with Santos, after declining requests to represent Brazil in the 1974 World Cup. Afterwards, he would occasionally play for Santos in friendly and commemorative matches. His 643 goals for Santos were the most goals scored for a single club until the record was surpassed by Lionel Messi of Barcelona in December 2020.

=== New York Cosmos ===
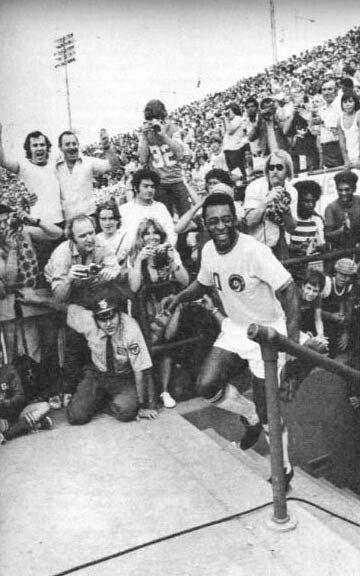
Pelé entering the field to play his first game with the Cosmos on 15 June 1975

Pelé came out of semi-retirement to sign with the New York Cosmos of the North American Soccer League for the 1975 season. At a chaotic press conference at New York's 21 Club, the Cosmos unveiled Pelé. John O'Reilly, the club's media spokesman, stated, "We had superstars in the United States but nothing at the level of Pelé. Everyone wanted to touch him, shake his hand, get a photo with him." Though well past his prime at this point, Pelé was credited with significantly increasing public interest in football in the US.

Pelé opened the door for many other stars to play in North America. Giorgio Chinaglia followed him to the Cosmos, then Franz Beckenbauer and his former Santos teammate Carlos Alberto. Over the next few years other players came to the league, including Johan Cruyff, Eusébio, Bobby Moore, George Best and Gordon Banks.

During Pelé's first public appearance in Boston, he was injured by a crowd of fans who had surrounded him, and was evacuated on a stretcher. Pelé made his debut for the Cosmos on 15 June 1975 against the Dallas Tornado at Downing Stadium, scoring one goal in a 2–2 draw. A week before the outbreak of the Lebanese Civil War, Pelé played a friendly game for the Lebanese club Nejmeh against a team of Lebanese Premier League stars.

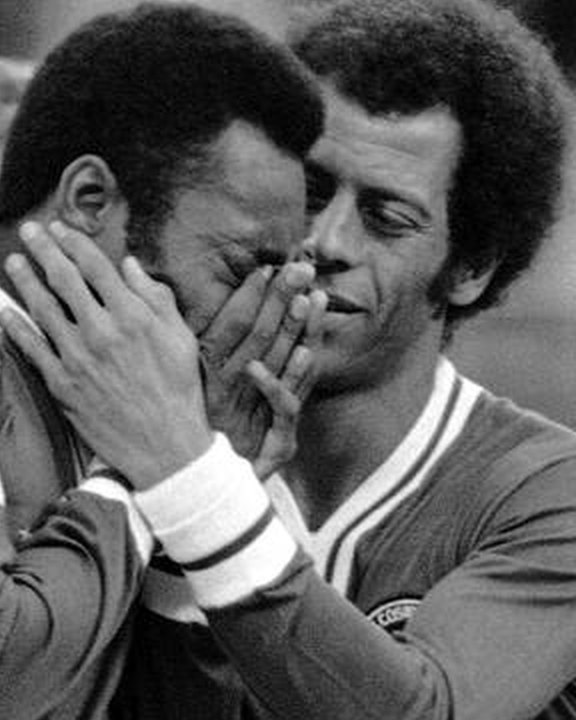
Carlos Alberto comforting Pelé after his farewell match with the Cosmos on 1 October 1977

The 1977 NASL season was Pelé's third and final season with New York, and the final season of his career. In June, the Cosmos won 3–0 over the Tampa Bay Rowdies, with the 37-year-old Pelé scoring a hat-trick. In the first leg of the league quarter-finals, Pelé's team attracted a league-record crowd of 77,891 as they achieved an 8–3 victory over the Fort Lauderdale Strikers. In the second leg of the semi-finals against the Rochester Lancers, the Cosmos won 4–1. Pelé finished his official playing career on 28 August, after leading the Cosmos to their second Soccer Bowl title with a 2–1 win over the Seattle Sounders.

On 1 October 1977, Pelé closed out his career with an exhibition match between the Cosmos and Santos. The match was played in front of a sold-out crowd at Giants Stadium and was televised on ABC's Wide World of Sports. Pelé's father and wife attended the match, as well as Muhammad Ali and Bobby Moore. Pelé played the first half of the match with the Cosmos, during which he scored a 30-yard free kick, which was the final goal of his career. He played the second half with Santos, and the Cosmos won the game 2–1. It started to rain during the second half, prompting a Brazilian newspaper to print the headline the following day: "Even The Sky Was Crying."

== International career ==
Pelé played his first match for the Brazilian national team on 7 July 1957, at the age of 16. During the 2–1 loss to Argentina, he scored his first goal for Brazil, and he remains the youngest goalscorer for his country.

=== 1958 FIFA World Cup ===
Pelé arrived in Sweden for the 1958 World Cup with a knee injury, which caused him to sit out the first two matches. A team psychologist told Brazil's coach Vicente Feola that the 17-year-old Pelé was "infantile" and not fit to play the next match against the USSR. Feola chose to play Pelé, who provided an assist during Brazil's 2–0 victory. Pelé was at the time the youngest player to participate in a World Cup, and he became the tournament's youngest goalscorer after scoring against Wales in the quarter-finals. During the semi-final against France, Pelé scored a hat-trick during the second half.

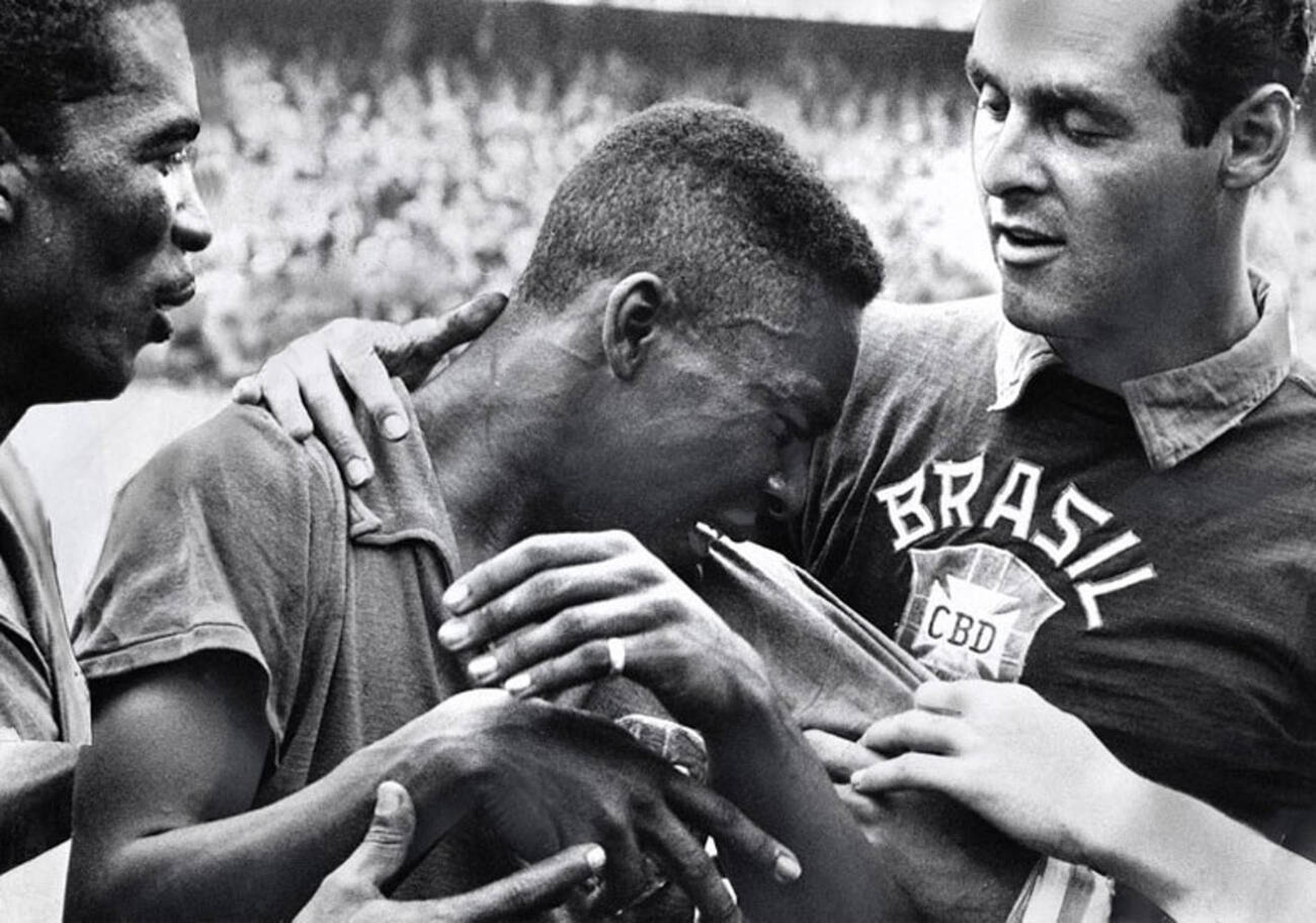
A 17-year-old Pelé cries on the shoulder of goalkeeper Gilmar after Brazil won the 1958 World Cup final.

On 29 June 1958, Pelé scored two goals as Brazil defeated Sweden 5–2 in the final. His first goal, in which he flicked the ball over a defender before volleying it into the corner of the net, was selected as one of the best goals in the history of the World Cup. When the match ended, Pelé passed out on the field. He was revived by his teammate Garrincha, and he wept while being congratulated by his team. He finished the World Cup with six goals in four matches played, and was named the best young player of the tournament. Sigvard Parling of the Swedish team would later comment, "When Pelé scored the fifth goal in that Final, I have to be honest and say I felt like applauding".

It was during the 1958 World Cup that Pelé began wearing a shirt with the number 10, which was the result of disorganization: the Brazilian Federation did not allocate shirt numbers for players, so FIFA chose the number 10 for him. In 2026, the shirt he wore during the 1958 World Cup final sold for $4.9 million at a Sotheby's auction in New York.

=== 1959 South American Championship ===
Pelé was the top scorer at the 1959 South American Championship with eight goals, and was named the best player of the tournament. Brazil finished second despite being undefeated in the tournament. (Note: Attributed to multiple references:)

=== 1962 World Cup and 1963 Roca Cup ===
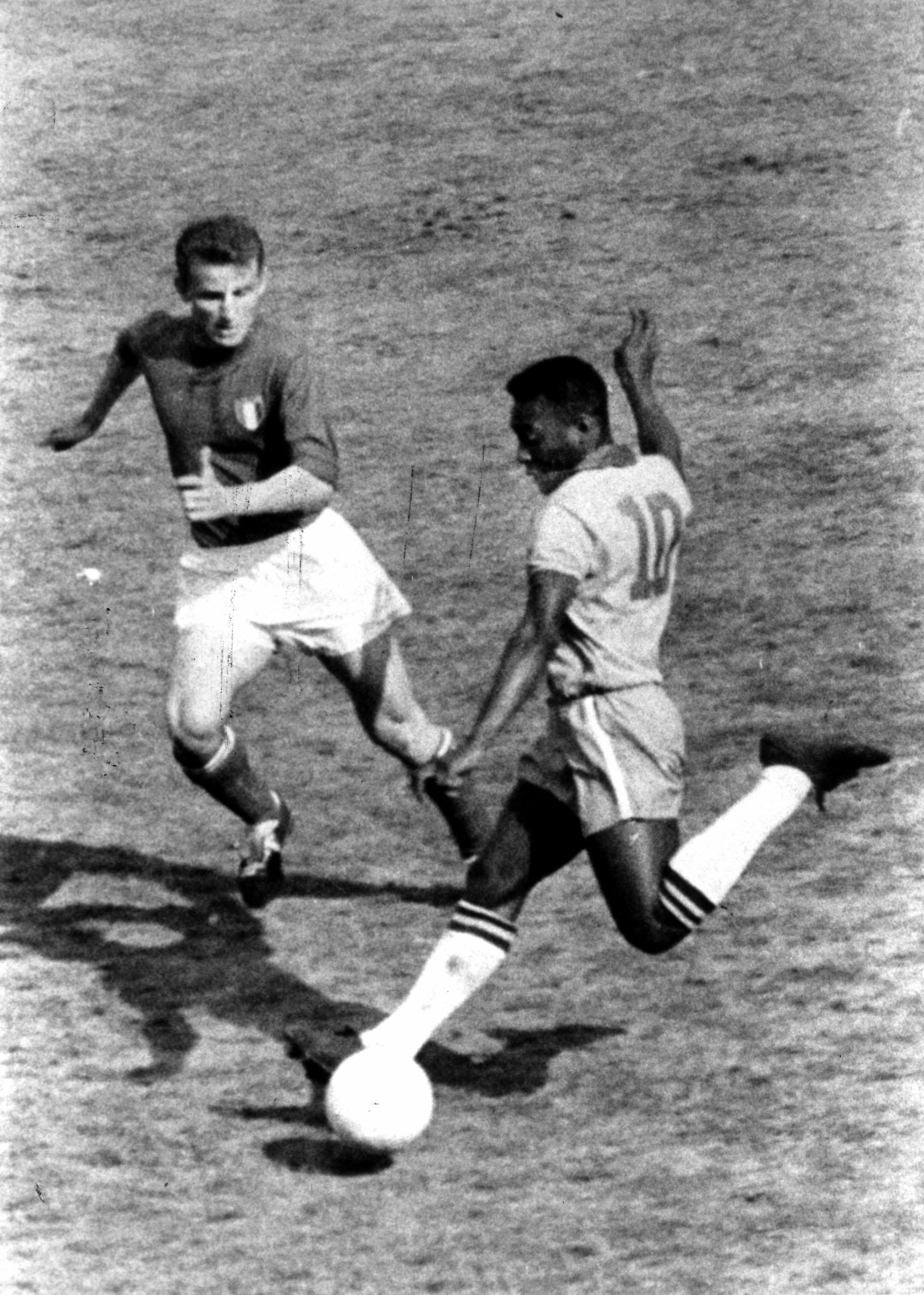
Pelé with Brazil taking on Italy's Giovanni Trapattoni at the San Siro, Milan, in 1963

When the 1962 FIFA World Cup in Chile started, Pelé was considered the best player in the world. In Brazil's first match of the tournament, he assisted the first goal and scored the second one, leading his team to a 2–0 victory over Mexico. He was injured during the next game while attempting a long-range shot against Czechoslovakia, which kept him out of the rest of the tournament. Brazil won the World Cup after defeating Czechoslovakia in the final. At the time, only players who appeared in the final were eligible for a medal; FIFA regulations were changed in 1978 to include the entire squad, and in 2007 Pelé received a winner's medal for the 1962 World Cup.

In his first appearances for Brazil since his return from injury, Pelé scored a hat-trick against Argentina in the second leg of the 1963 Roca Cup as Brazil won the trophy 7–5 on aggregate. The team then played five games in Europe which included another hat-trick for Pelé against France in Paris.

=== 1966 World Cup ===
There were high expectations for Brazil in the 1966 FIFA World Cup, held in England. In addition to Pelé, the Brazilian squad featured the stars Djalma Santos, Garrincha, Gérson, Gilmar, Jairzinho and Tostão. Pelé scored in the first match against Bulgaria, becoming the first player to score in three successive FIFA World Cups. However, he was injured due to persistent fouling by the Bulgarians, and had to miss the second game against Hungary. After witnessing the fouls, Brazil's coach Vicente Feola expected that other teams would treat Pelé in a similar manner. Brazil lost to Hungary, and Pelé, although still recovering, was brought back for the last crucial match against Portugal. During the game, Portugal defender João Morais fouled Pelé twice, but was not sent off by referee George McCabe, a decision retrospectively viewed as being among the worst refereeing errors in World Cup history. Pelé had to stay on the field limping for the rest of the game since substitutes were not allowed in football at that time. Brazil lost the match and were eliminated from the tournament. After the game, Pelé vowed he would never play again in the World Cup.

=== 1970 World Cup ===
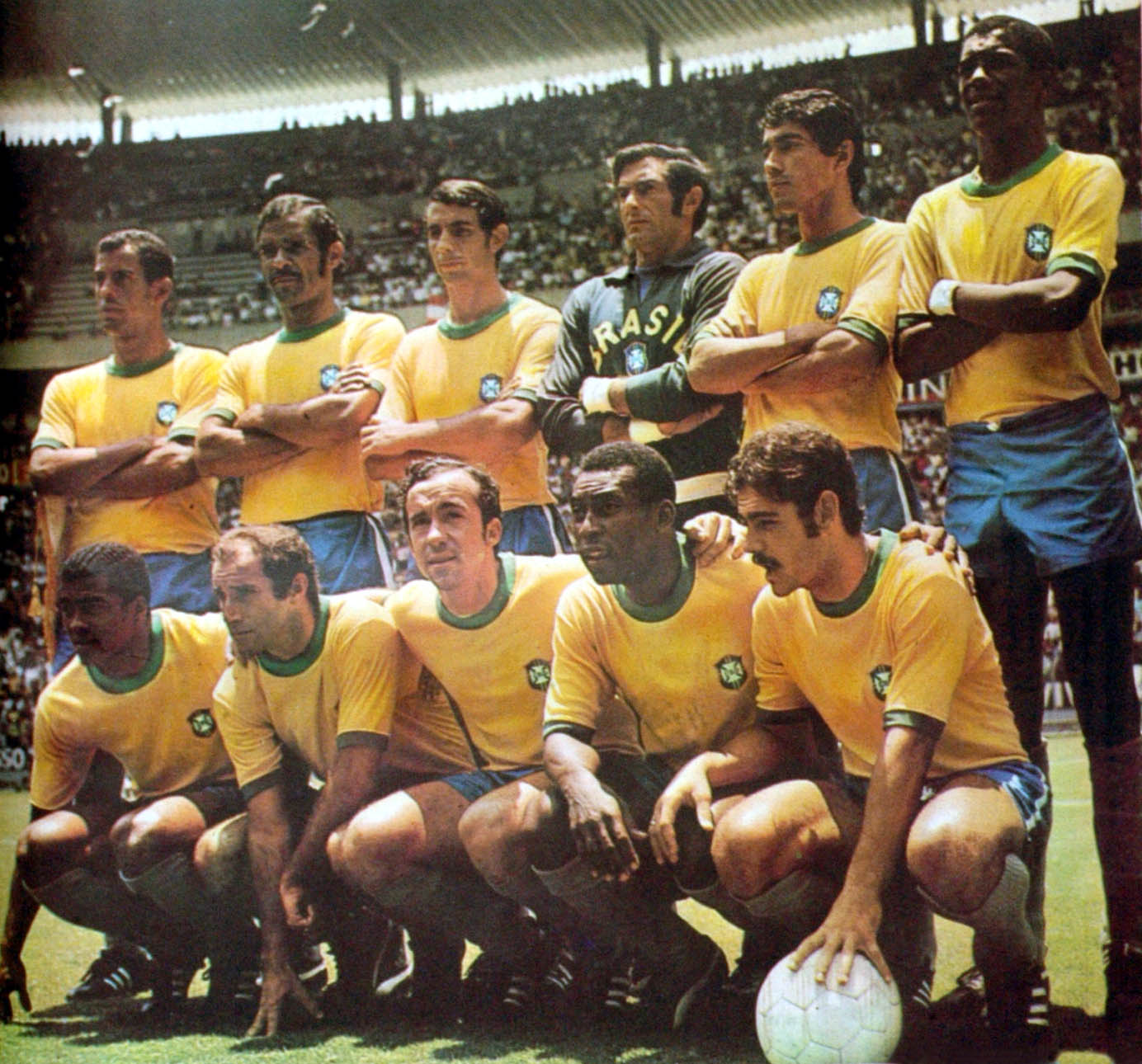
The Brazil team of 1970, with Pelé in the front row, second from the right

When Pelé was called to the national team in early 1969, he refused at first, but then accepted and scored six goals in six World Cup qualifying matches. The 1970 FIFA World Cup in Mexico was expected to be Pelé's last. Brazil's squad for the tournament was markedly different than the 1966 team. Star players Garrincha, Nilton Santos, Valdir Pereira, Djalma Santos, and Gilmar had retired. However, Brazil's 1970 World Cup squad, which included Pelé, Rivellino, Jairzinho, Gérson, Carlos Alberto Torres, Tostão and Clodoaldo, has often been considered the greatest football team in history. (Note: Attributed to multiple references:)

The front five of Jairzinho, Pelé, Gerson, Tostão, and Rivellino together created an attacking momentum, with Pelé playing a key role in Brazil's road to the final. In the first group stage match, a 4–1 win over Czechoslovakia, Pelé became the second player after Uwe Seeler to score in four different editions of the tournament. Later in the game, he narrowly missed scoring from the halfway line. (Note: Attributed to multiple references:) During Brazil's next match, a 1–0 victory over England, Pelé's header was blocked by goalkeeper Gordon Banks; the moment has been referred to as the "save of the century". (Note: Attributed to multiple references:) Years later, Pelé would comment on Banks' save: "I have scored more than a thousand goals in my life and the thing people always talk to me about is the one I didn't score."

Pelé scored two goals during Brazil's final group stage match, a 3–2 win over Romania. During the semi-final against Uruguay, he set up Rivellino's goal and later performed a "run around" move against goalkeeper Ladislao Mazurkiewicz, which became one of his most famous plays. Tostão made a pass to Pelé, and Mazurkiewicz ran to intercept the ball. Pelé got there first and fooled Mazurkiewicz with a feint; as the ball rolled to the goalkeeper's left, Pelé went around him without touching the ball, then took a shot while turning towards the goal. He turned too far as he shot, and the ball drifted just wide of the far post. (Note: Attributed to multiple references:)

Video
- The Pelé run around on YouTube

Brazil played against Italy in the final at the Azteca Stadium in Mexico City. Pelé scored the opening goal with a header, which was Brazil's 100th World Cup goal. His leap of joy into the arms of his teammate Jairzinho following the goal is regarded as one of the most iconic moments in World Cup history. Pelé then made assists for Brazil's third and fourth goals. The last goal of the game is often considered the greatest team goal of all time because it involved all but two of the team's outfield players. The play culminated in a blind pass from Pelé that went to Carlos Alberto, allowing him to score; Brazil achieved a 4–1 victory. Pelé finished the tournament with 4 goals and 6 assists. Tarcisio Burgnich, an Italian player who marked Pelé during the final, was quoted as saying, "I told myself before the game, he's made of skin and bones just like everyone else. But I was wrong".

Pelé's last international match was on 18 July 1971 against Yugoslavia in Rio de Janeiro. With Pelé on the field, the Brazilian team's record was 67 wins, 14 draws, and 11 losses. Brazil never lost a match while fielding both Pelé and Garrincha. Pelé's 77 goals in 92 games for Brazil saw him hold the record as the national team's top goalscorer for over fifty years until it was surpassed by Neymar in September 2023, in his 125th game.

On 19 December 1973, Pelé played for a Brazil XI team against the Rest of The World in a farewell game for Garrincha, scoring the equalizer in an eventual 2–1 win. In July 1983, the 42-year-old Pelé played for another Brazil XI squad against a South Brazil team in a friendly to benefit the victims of a flood in Santa Catarina; he scored a free kick in a 1–2 loss.

== Style of play ==
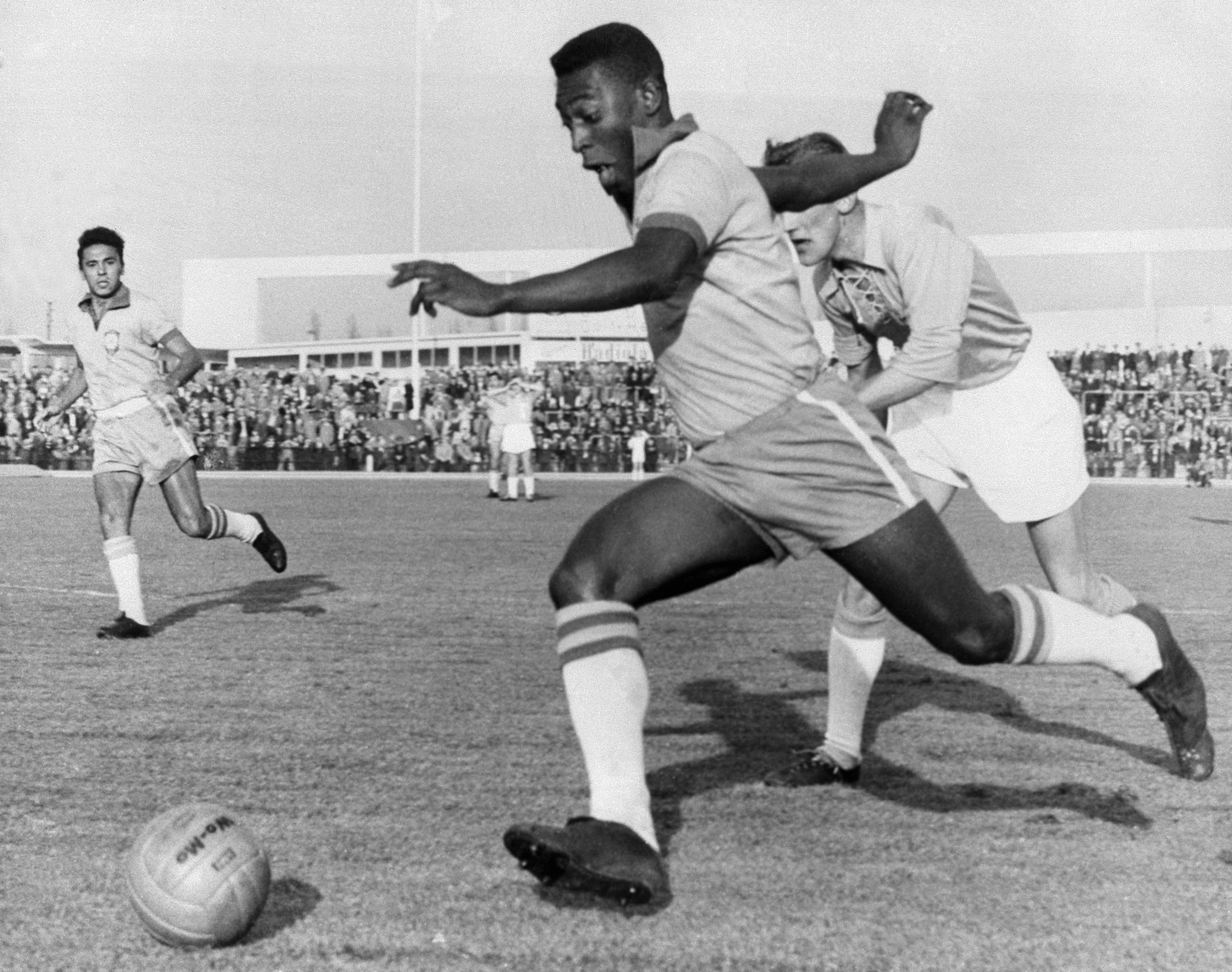
Pelé dribbling past a defender while playing for Brazil in May 1960

Pelé was known for connecting the phrase "The Beautiful Game" with football. A prolific goalscorer, he was known for his ability to anticipate his opponents' movements and finish off chances with an accurate and powerful shot with either foot. (Note: Attributed to multiple references:) He has been described as a hard-working and complete player with exceptional vision and intelligence, and has been recognised for his precise passing and ability to provide assists. (Note: Attributed to multiple references:) Brazil's 1970 World Cup-winning captain Carlos Alberto Torres remarked: "His great secret was improvisation. He had an extraordinary perception of the game."

During his early career, Pelé played in a variety of attacking positions. Although he often operated inside the penalty area as a striker or centre forward, his wide range of skills allowed him to also play as an inside forward or a second striker. (Note: Attributed to multiple references:) Later in his career, he took on a playmaking role behind the strikers, often functioning as an attacking midfielder. Pelé's playing style combined speed, creativity, and technical skill with physical power, stamina, and athleticism. His technique, flair, agility, and dribbling skills allowed him to beat opponents with the ball, and frequently saw him use sudden changes of direction and elaborate feints to get past players, such as his trademark move, the drible da vaca. (Note: Attributed to multiple references:) Another one of his signature moves was the paradinha, or "little stop". (Note: Pelé would stop in the middle of a run-up to a penalty kick before shooting the ball; goalkeepers complained that this gave strikers an unfair advantage, however, and in the 1970s, FIFA banned this move from competitions.) Pelé excelled in the air, due to his heading accuracy, timing, and elevation. (Note: Attributed to multiple references:) He was known for his bending shots and the accuracy of his free kicks and penalty kicks, although he often refrained from taking penalty kicks, as he believed it was a cowardly way to score. Pelé earned a reputation for being a "big game player" due to his tendency to score crucial goals in important matches. (Note: Attributed to multiple references:)

Pelé was also known to be a fair and highly influential player, who stood out for his charismatic leadership and sportsmanship on the pitch. His warm embrace of Bobby Moore following the Brazil vs England game at the 1970 World Cup is viewed as the embodiment of sportsmanship, with The New York Times stating the image "captured the respect that two great players had for each other. As they exchanged jerseys, touches, and looks, the sportsmanship between them was all in the image. No gloating and no fist-pumping from Pelé. No despair, no defeatism from Bobby Moore."

== Legacy ==
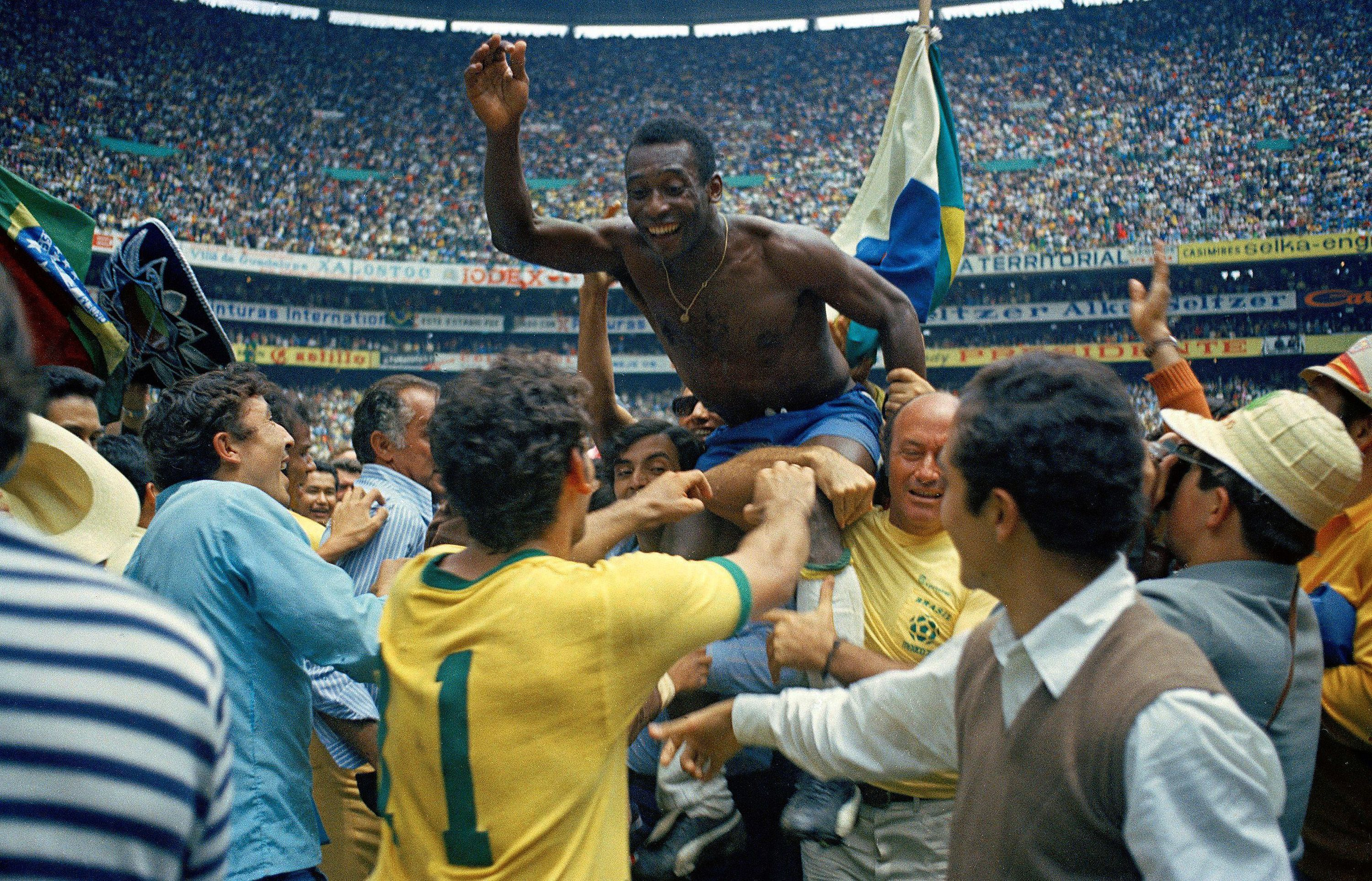
Pelé being held aloft after winning the 1970 World Cup final in Mexico City. He is the only player to win three World Cups.

Named the "greatest" by FIFA in 2012 and 2024, Pelé is one of the most lauded players in the history of football and has been frequently ranked as the greatest and most important player of all time. (Note: Attributed to multiple references:) Barney Ronay of The Guardian wrote that Pelé was the first global sports superstar, while David Goldblatt said that he "set the standards by which footballing greatness is judged". According to Tostão, Pelé's strike partner at the 1970 World Cup, "Pelé was the greatest – he was simply flawless." England's 1966 World Cup–winning captain Bobby Moore commented: "Pelé was the most complete player I've ever seen, he had everything ... Perfect balance and impossible vision. He was the greatest because he could do anything and everything". Former Manchester United striker Bobby Charlton said he felt "as though football was invented for this magical player." Former Real Madrid and Hungary star Ferenc Puskás stated: "The greatest player in history was Di Stéfano. I refuse to classify Pelé as a player. He was above that." Pelé's teammate Clodoaldo observed that around the world, people wanted to touch or kiss Pelé, or kiss the ground he walked on. Observing the effect Pelé had on people, journalist Simon Hattenstone compared him to Princess Diana, Mother Teresa and Nelson Mandela. Hattenstone wrote, "To be touched by Pelé is to be blessed." Multiple former players have compared Pelé to a god. (Note: Attributed to multiple references:)

US diplomat Henry Kissinger stated: "Performance at a high level in any sport is to exceed the ordinary human scale. But Pelé's performance transcended that of the ordinary star by as much as the star exceeds ordinary performance." The artist Andy Warhol remarked that instead of 15 minutes of fame, Pelé would have 15 centuries.

=== Accolades ===
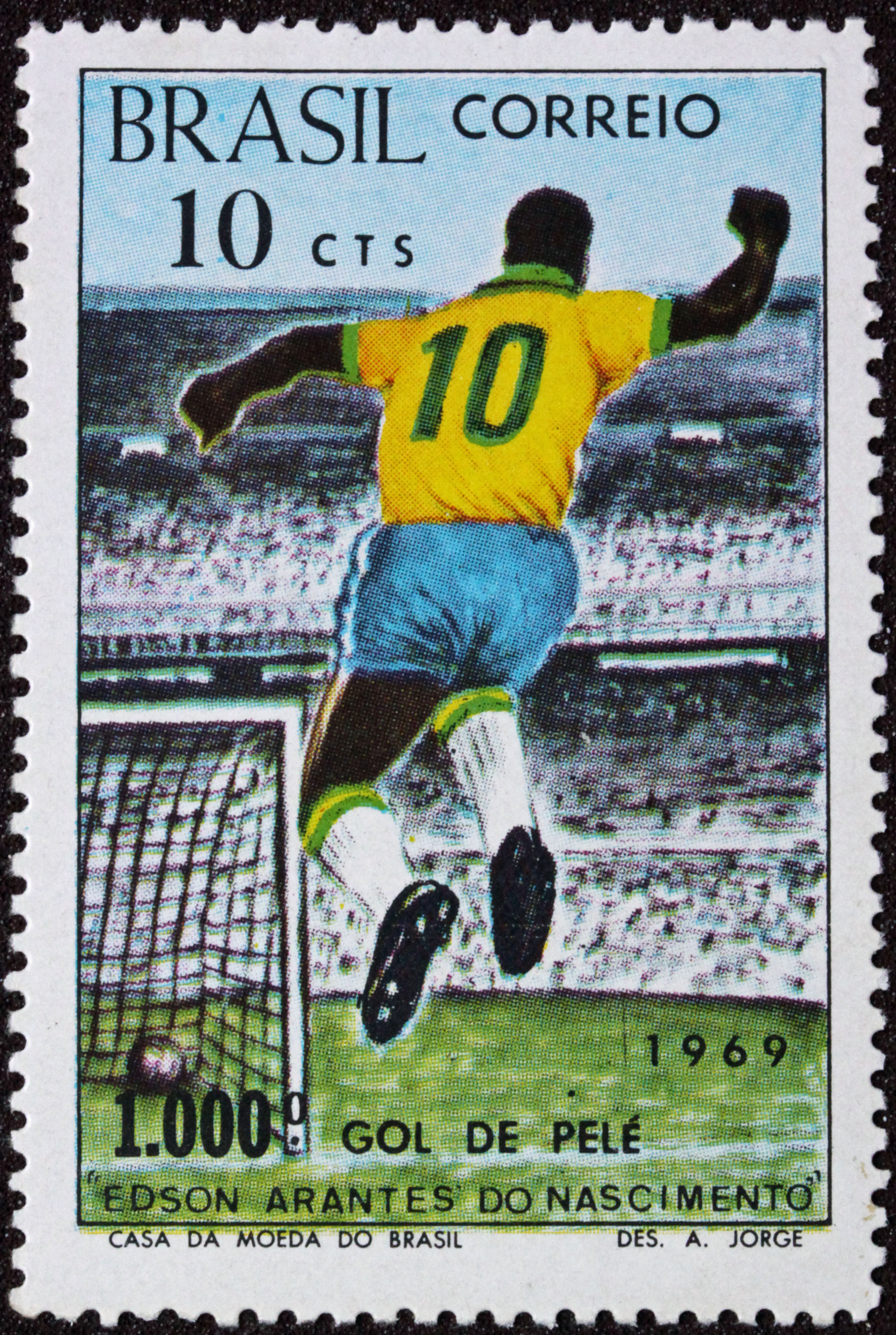
A 1969 Brazil postage stamp commemorating Pelé's 1,000th goal

Presenting Pelé with the Laureus Lifetime Achievement Award, former South African president Nelson Mandela said, "To watch him play was to watch the delight of a child combined with the extraordinary grace of a man in full." In 1999, the International Olympic Committee elected Pelé the Athlete of the Century, while Time magazine named him one of the 100 Most Important People of the 20th Century. In 2000, the International Federation of Football History & Statistics (IFFHS) voted Pelé the World Player of the Century. During his career, he became known as "the Black Pearl" (A Pérola Negra), "the King of Football" (O Rei do Futebol ), "the King Pelé" (O Rei Pelé) or simply "the King" (O Rei ). In 2014, the city of Santos inaugurated the Museu Pelé, a museum which displays a 2,400-piece collection of Pelé memorabilia. Approximately $22 million was invested in the construction of the museum.

Pelé is ranked among the leading scorers in football history in both official and total matches. According to the RSSSF, Pelé scored 538 league goals and a total of 775 goals in 840 official games. The RSSSF put Pelé's grand total at 1,301 goals in 1,390 appearances during his professional senior career, which included friendlies and tour games. After he scored his 1,000th goal on 19 November 1969 in the Maracanã Stadium against Vasco da Gama, the Brazilian postal service issued a commemorative stamp.

In January 2014, Pelé was awarded the first-ever FIFA Ballon d'Or Prix d'Honneur to acknowledge his contributions to football around the world. In 2020, he was named in the Ballon d'Or Dream Team. At the Best FIFA Football Awards 2022 in February 2023, Pelé was posthumously awarded the FIFA Best Special Award.

== Sponsorships and business interests ==
Ahead of the 1970 World Cup, the German sportswear companies Adidas and Puma—each owned by one of the Dassler brothers—established the "Pelé Pact". The pact was an agreement that neither company would sign a sponsorship deal with Pelé, due to the possibility of an expensive bidding war. However, Puma broke the pact and signed Pelé. In addition to paying him a percentage of Puma King boot sales, the company paid Pelé US$120,000 ($2.85 million in 2022) to tie his laces prior to Brazil's quarter-final against Peru. (Note: Attributed to multiple references:) With news cameras recording Pelé, the Puma King Pelé boots were broadcast to a global audience, generating enormous publicity for the brand. Puma's deal with Pelé played a prominent role in the Dassler brothers feud. Many business experts credited the feud with transforming sports apparel into a multi-billion-pound industry.

In 1976, Pelé was on a Pepsi-sponsored trip in Lagos, Nigeria, when the military attempted a coup. Pelé was trapped in a hotel with Arthur Ashe and other professional tennis players, who were participating in the 1976 Lagos WCT tournament. Pelé and the others eventually left the hotel and stayed at the residence of Brazil's ambassador, as they could not leave the country for several days. Eventually the airport was opened and Pelé left Nigeria disguised as a pilot.

In 1993, Pelé publicly accused the Brazilian football administrator Ricardo Teixeira of corruption after Pelé's television company was rejected in a contest for the Brazilian domestic rights to the 1994 World Cup. Pelé's accusations led to an eight-year feud between him and Teixeira. As a consequence of the feud, the President of FIFA, João Havelange, Teixeira's father-in-law, banned Pelé from participating in the draw for the 1994 FIFA World Cup in Las Vegas.

In 2016, Pelé filed a lawsuit in the US against South Korean electronics company Samsung, claiming violations under the Lanham Act for false endorsement, as well as a violation of his right of publicity. The suit, which sought US$30 million in damages, alleged that Samsung and Pelé had nearly entered into a licensing agreement for Pelé to appear in a Samsung advertising campaign, but Samsung abruptly pulled out of the negotiations. The October 2015 advert in question included images of a man who allegedly resembled Pelé. The case was settled out of court several years later.

== Philanthropy and public service ==
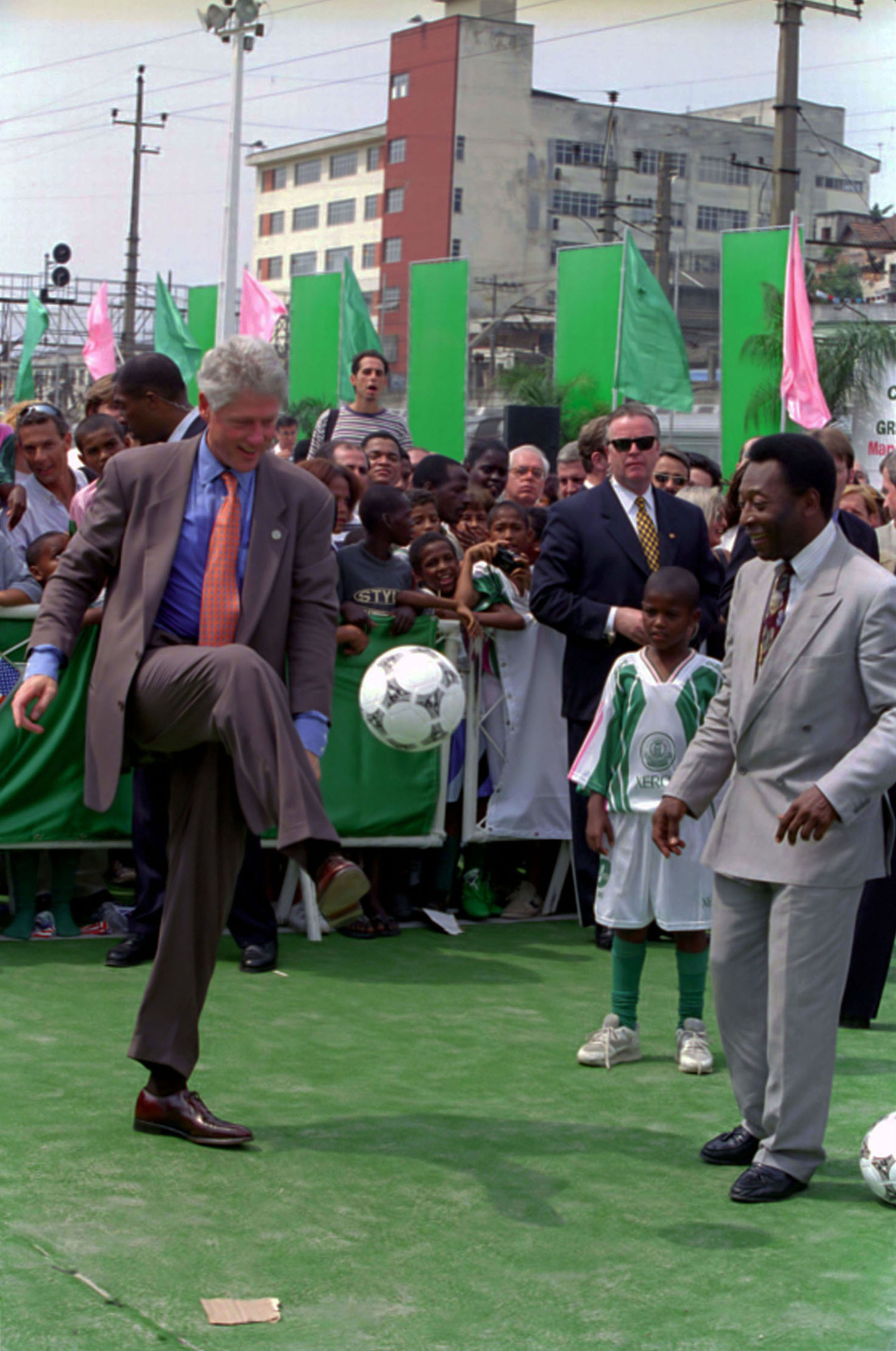
As Brazil's Minister of Sport, Pelé met with US president Bill Clinton in Rio de Janeiro in 1997

In 1992, Pelé was appointed a United Nations ambassador for ecology and the environment, and in 1994 he was named a UNESCO Goodwill Ambassador. He supported various charitable causes and organisations throughout his life, including Action for Brazil's Children, Gols Pela Vida, SOS Children's Villages, The Littlest Lamb, and Prince's Rainforests Project. (Note: Attributed to multiple references:) In 2001, he was accused of involvement in a corruption scandal that resulted in a theft of $700,000 from UNICEF. It was claimed that money given to Pelé's company for a benefit match was not returned after the match was cancelled. The claim was not proven, and it was denied by UNICEF.

In January 1995, Pelé was appointed Brazil's Minister of Sport by President Fernando Cardoso. During his tenure, Pelé proposed legislation to reduce corruption in Brazilian football, which became known as the "Pelé law". He left office on 29 April 1998, when the ministry was abolished. In 1997, Pelé received an honorary knighthood from Queen Elizabeth II in a ceremony at Buckingham Palace.

On 9 August 2012, Pelé was awarded an honorary degree from the University of Edinburgh for his contributions to humanitarian and environmental causes, and for his sporting achievements. Three days later, he attended the 2012 Olympic hunger summit hosted by British prime minister David Cameron in London, which was part of a series of international efforts to highlight hunger as an important global issue. In 2016, Pelé auctioned more than 1600 items and raised £3.6 million for charity. In 2018, he launched the Pelé Foundation, which carries out charitable work related to poverty and education around the world.

== Other activities ==
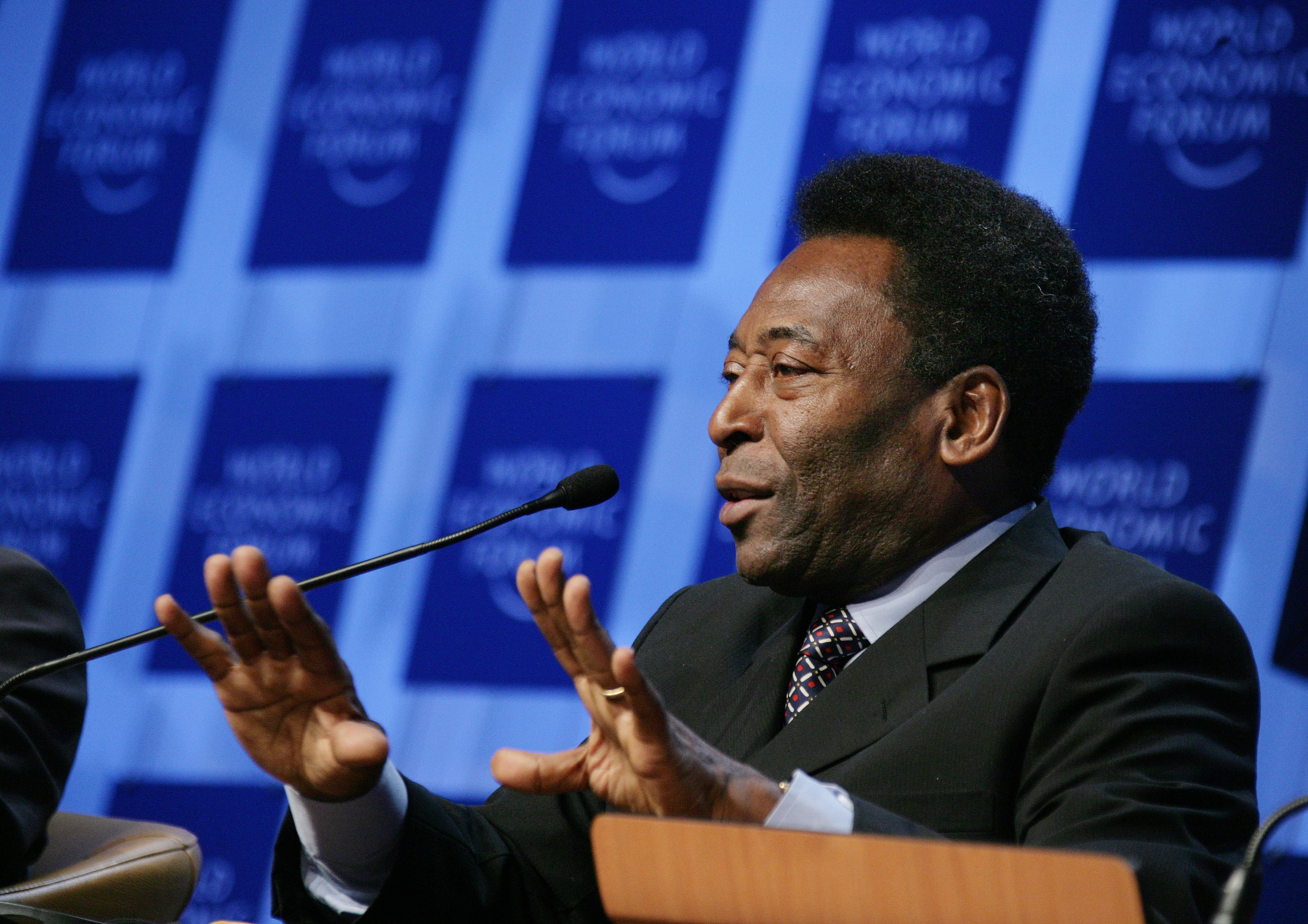
Pelé at the World Economic Forum in Switzerland, 2006

Pelé published several autobiographies, starred in documentary films, and composed musical pieces, including Sérgio Mendes' soundtrack for the film Pelé (1977). He appeared in the 1981 film Escape to Victory, about a World War II–era football match between Allied prisoners of war and a German team. In 1969, Pelé starred in a telenovela called Os Estranhos, about first contact with aliens, which was created to drum up interest in the Apollo missions. Pelé was asked to participate in the 2006 ESPN documentary film Once in a Lifetime: The Extraordinary Story of the New York Cosmos, but declined when the producers would not pay his requested $100,000 fee.

Pelé appeared at the 2006 World Economic Forum in Davos, Switzerland, speaking about the role of sport in economic development. In November 2007, Pelé was the guest of honour at an exhibition match celebrating the 150th anniversary of Sheffield F.C., the world's oldest football club. While in Sheffield, Pelé opened an exhibition which included the first public showing in 40 years of the original hand-written rules of football.

In 2009, Pelé assisted the Rio de Janeiro bid for the 2016 Summer Olympics, spearheading the Rio 2016 presentation to the Association of National Olympic Committees of Africa General Assembly in Abuja, Nigeria. In August 2010, Pelé was introduced as the honorary president of a revived New York Cosmos.

On 1 June 2022, Pelé published an open letter to President Vladimir Putin of Russia on his Instagram account, in which he asked Putin to stop the "evil" and "unjustified" invasion of Ukraine. (Note: Attributed to multiple references:)

=== Filmography ===
Year	Title	Role	Notes	Ref
1969	Os Estranhos	Plínio Pompeu	TV series	
1971	O Barão Otelo no Barato dos Bilhões	Dr. Arantes/Himself		
1972	A Marcha	Chico Bondade		
1981	Escape to Victory	Corporal Luis Fernandez		
1983	A Minor Miracle	Himself	Also known as Young Giants	
1985	Pedro Mico			
1986	Hotshot	Santos		
1986	Os Trapalhões e o Rei do Futebol	Nascimento		
1989	Solidão, Uma Linda História de Amor			
2001	Mike Bassett: England Manager	Himself		
2016	Pelé: Birth of a Legend	Man sitting in hotel lobby	Cameo appearance	

== Personal life ==
=== Relationships and children ===
Pelé's children
- By Anizia Machado
  - Sandra (1964–2006)
- By Lenita Kurtz
  - Flávia (born 1968)
- By Rosemeri dos Reis Cholbi
  - Kely Cristina (born 1967)
  - Edson (born 1970)
  - Jennifer (born 1978)
- By Assíria Lemos Seixas
  - Joshua (born 1996)
  - Celeste (born 1996)

Pelé married three times and had several extramarital affairs, fathering seven children in all. In 1966, he married Rosemeri dos Reis Cholbi. They had two daughters, Kely Cristina and Jennifer, and a son, Edson. Pelé and Cholbi divorced in 1982. In 2014, Edson was sentenced to 33 years in prison for laundering money from drug trafficking. On appeal, the sentence was reduced to 12 years and 10 months.

From 1981 to 1986, Pelé was romantically linked with the television presenter Xuxa. She was 17 when they started dating. In 1994, Pelé married the psychologist and gospel singer Assíria Lemos Seixas, who gave birth to the twins Joshua and Celeste through fertility treatments. Pelé and Seixas divorced in 2008.

Pelé had at least two more children from extramarital affairs. Sandra Machado was conceived from an affair he had in 1964 with a housemaid, Anizia Machado. Sandra fought for years to be acknowledged by Pelé, who refused to submit to DNA tests. (Note: Attributed to multiple references:) He finally relented, and a court-ordered DNA test proved she was his daughter. Sandra died of cancer in 2006. (Note: Attributed to multiple references:)

In 2016, Pelé married Marcia Aoki, a Japanese-Brazilian importer of medical equipment from Penápolis, São Paulo. The couple had been dating since 2010.

=== Religious beliefs ===
A devout Catholic, Pelé sent Pope Francis an autographed Brazil national team jersey in 2014. The jersey and a football signed by Brazil striker Ronaldo were presented to the Pope by Brazilian president Dilma Rousseff during a visit to the Vatican.

=== Health ===
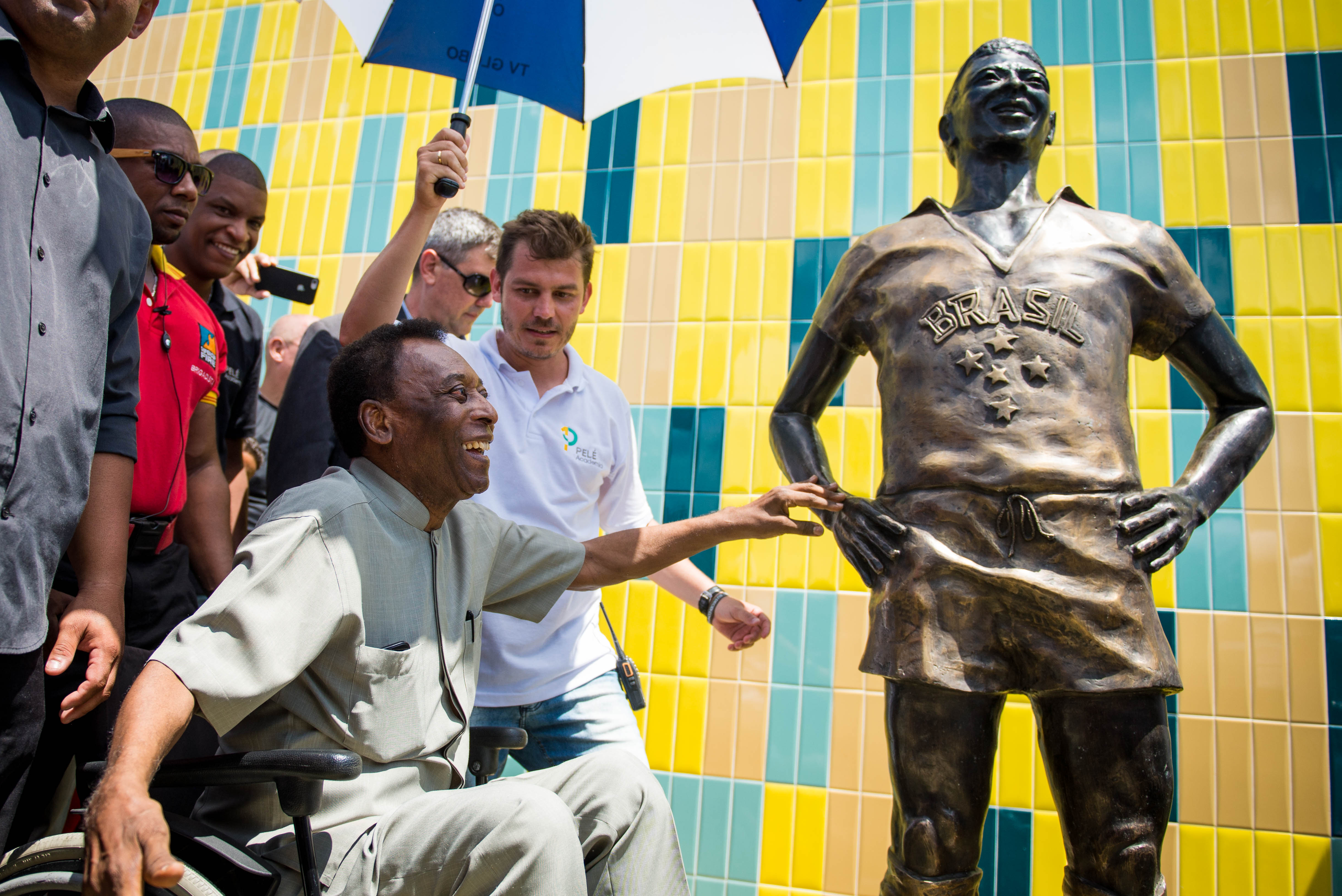
Pelé in a wheelchair at the unveiling of his statue in Rio de Janeiro in 2018

In 1977, Pelé had his right kidney removed. In 2012, he underwent a successful hip operation. In December 2017, he appeared in a wheelchair at the 2018 World Cup draw in Moscow, and a month later he collapsed from exhaustion and was taken to hospital. In 2019, after a hospitalisation due to a urinary tract infection, Pelé underwent surgery to remove kidney stones. The following year, his son Edinho reported that Pelé was unable to walk independently and reluctant to leave home; Edinho ascribed his father's condition to a lack of rehabilitation following his hip operation.

== Death and funeral ==
In 2021, Pelé was diagnosed with colon cancer. He underwent surgery the same month, and was treated with several rounds of chemotherapy. In early 2022, metastasis was detected in his intestine, lung and liver. On 29 November, he was admitted to the Albert Einstein Israelite Hospital in São Paulo due to a respiratory infection after he contracted COVID-19, and for reassessment of the treatment of the cancer. On 3 December, it was reported that Pelé had become unresponsive to chemotherapy and was in palliative care.

He had a magnetic presence and, when you were with him, the rest of the world stopped. Today, the whole world mourns the loss of Pelé; the greatest footballer of all time.

— FIFA President Gianni Infantino

On 21 December, the hospital stated that Pelé's tumour had advanced and he required "greater care related to renal and cardiac dysfunctions". He was not allowed to spend Christmas at home, as his family had wanted. Pelé died on 29 December 2022 at the age of 82, due to multiple organ failure, a complication of colon cancer. Pelé's death certificate stated that he had died of kidney failure, heart failure, bronchopneumonia and colon adenocarcinoma. Pelé was survived by his 100-year-old mother, Dona Celeste, although she had been in a vegetative state since 2019, and was therefore unaware of his death.

Tributes were paid to Pelé by current and former players, including Neymar, Cristiano Ronaldo, Kylian Mbappé, Lionel Messi, Ronaldo and Roberto Carlos, along with other major sporting figures, celebrities, and world leaders. (Note: Attributed to multiple references:) The outgoing Brazilian president, Jair Bolsonaro, declared a three-day period of national mourning. At FIFA headquarters in Zürich, the flags of the 211 member associations were flown at half-mast. Landmarks and stadiums were lit up in honour of Pelé, including Rio de Janeiro's Christ the Redeemer statue and Maracanã Stadium, the CONMEBOL headquarters in Paraguay, and Wembley Stadium in London. There was applause and a minute's silence at football matches in honour of Pelé.

"I used to go out and people said Pelé! Pelé! Pelé! Pelé! all over the world, but no one remembers Edson. Edson is the person who has the feelings, who has the family, who works hard, and Pelé is the idol ... Pelé will never die ... But Edson is a normal person who is going to die one day, and the people forget that."

— Pelé, June 2003

Pelé's funeral, which involved his body being publicly displayed in an open coffin draped with the flags of Brazil and Santos FC, began at Vila Belmiro stadium in Santos on 2 January 2023. (Note: Attributed to multiple references:) Thousands of fans—many of whom were wearing Pelé's No. 10 Brazilian jersey or his Santos club jersey—flooded the streets to attend the first day of the funeral service. Some attendees said they had to wait three hours in line. The public wake lasted until the following day and had more than 230,000 people in attendance, including Pelé's wife Marcia Aoki, his son Edinho, Brazilian president Luiz Inácio Lula da Silva, FIFA president Gianni Infantino, CONMEBOL president Alejandro Domínguez, and Ednaldo Rodrigues, the president of the Brazilian Football Confederation. (Note: Attributed to multiple references:) Brazilian television channels suspended normal broadcasting to cover the funeral procession. After the procession, Pelé was buried at the Memorial Necrópole Ecumênica. (Note: Attributed to multiple references:)

Kigali Pelé Stadium in Rwanda was renamed in honor of him in March 2023 by Infantino and Rwandan president Paul Kagame as part of the 73rd FIFA Congress. On 26 April 2023, the nickname pelé became synonymous with "exceptional, incomparable, unique" in the Michaelis Portuguese-language dictionary after a campaign with 125,000 signatories.

== Career statistics ==
=== Club ===
Pelé's goalscoring record is often reported by FIFA as being 1,281 goals in 1,363 games. This figure includes goals scored in friendly club matches (including international tours with Santos and the New York Cosmos) and goals scored in several games Pelé played in for the Brazilian armed forces teams and the state team of São Paulo. Pelé was listed in the Guinness World Records for most career goals scored in football. In 2000, the International Federation of Football History & Statistics (IFFHS) declared Pelé the "World's Best and Successful Top Division Goal Scorer of all time" with 541 goals in 560 games, and honoured him with a trophy.

The tables below record every goal Pelé scored in official club competitions for Santos FC and all matches and goals for the New York Cosmos.

Santos FC records
Club	Season	Campeonato Paulista		Rio-São Paulo (Note: Soccer Europe compiled this list from RSSSF.)		Campeonato Brasileiro Série A (Note: Statistics from 1957 to 1974 for the Taça de Prata, Taça Brasil and Copa Libertadores were taken from Soccer Europe website. Soccer Europe lists RSSSF, but do not give a season-by-season breakdown.)		Domestic competitions Sub-total		International competitions				Total	
Club	Season	Campeonato Paulista		Rio-São Paulo		Campeonato Brasileiro Série A		Domestic competitions Sub-total		Copa Libertadores		Intercontinental Cup		Total	
Club	Season	Apps	Goals	Apps	Goals	Apps	Goals	Apps	Goals	Apps	Goals	Apps	Goals	Apps	Goals
Santos	1956	0*	0*					1	1					1	1
Santos	1957	14+15*	19+17* (Note: In 1957, the Paulista Championship was divided in two phases: Blue Series and White Series. In the first, Pelé scored 19 goals in 14 games, and in the Blue Series, scored 17 goals in 15 games.) (Note: This number was inferred from a Santos fixture list from rsssf.com and this list of games Pelé played.)	9	5			38*	41*					38*	41*
Santos	1958	38	58	8	8			46	66					46*	66*
Santos	1959	32	45	7	6	4*	2*	39	51					43*	53*
Santos	1960	30	33	3	0	0	0	33	33	0	0	0	0	33*	33*
Santos	1961	26	47	7	8	5*	7	33	55	0	0	0	0	38*	62*
Santos	1962	26	37	0	0	5*	2*	26	37	4*	4*	2	5	37*	48*
Santos	1963	19	22	8	14	4*	8	27	36	4*	5*	1	2	36	51*
Santos	1964	21	34	4	3	6*	7	25	37	0*	0*	0	0	31*	44*
Santos	1965	28	49	7	5	4*	2*	39	54	7*	8	0	0	46*	64*
Santos	1966	14	13	0*	0*	5*	2*	14*	13*	0	0	0	0	19*	15*
Santos	1967	18	17			14*	9*	32*	26*	0	0	0	0	32*	26*
Santos	1968	21	17			17*	12*	38*	28*	0	0	5	1 (Note: Intercontinental Super Cup)	43*	30*
Santos	1969	25	26			12*	12*	37*	38*	0	0	0	0	37*	38*
Santos	1970	15	7			13*	4*	28*	11*	0	0	0	0	28*	11*
Santos	1971	19	6			21	1	40	7	0	0	0	0	40	7
Santos	1972	20	9			16	5	36	14	0	0	0	0	36	14
Santos	1973	19	11			30	19	49	30	0	0	0	0	49	30
Santos	1974	10	1			17	9	27	10	0	0	0	0	27	10
Santos	Total	410	468	53	49	173*	101*	636*	618*	15	17 (Note: Statistics from 1957 to 1974 for the Taça de Prata, Taça Brasil and Copa Libertadores were taken from Soccer Europe website. Soccer Europe lists RSSSF, but do not give a season-by-season breakdown.)	8	8	659	643

- * Indicates that the number was deduced from the list of rsssf.com and this list of Pelé games.

New York Cosmos records
Club	Season	League (Note: RSSSF recognizes as league goals those scored in NASL, the post season play-offs, Campeonato Paulista goals and the original Campeonato Brazileiro goals (1971–1974). IFFHS has made the same validation in the past.)		Postseason		Other		Total	
Club	Season	Apps	Goals	Apps	Goals	Apps	Goals	Apps	Goals
New York Cosmos	1975	9	5	–		14	12	23	17
New York Cosmos	1976	22	13	2	2	18	11	42	26
New York Cosmos	1977	25	13	6	4	11	6	42	23
Total		56	31	8	6	43	29	107	66

=== International ===
With 77 goals in 92 official appearances, Pelé is the second-highest goalscorer of the Brazilian national team. He scored twelve goals and is credited with ten assists in fourteen World Cup matches.

International records
Team	Year	Apps	Goals	Goal average
Brazil	1957	2	2	1.00
Brazil	1958	7	9	1.28
Brazil	1959	9	11	1.22
Brazil	1960	6	4	0.67
Brazil	1961	0	0	—
Brazil	1962	8	8	1.00
Brazil	1963	7	7	1.00
Brazil	1964	3	2	0.67
Brazil	1965	8	9	1.12
Brazil	1966	9	5	0.55
Brazil	1967	0	0	—
Brazil	1968	7	4	0.57
Brazil	1969	9	7	0.77
Brazil	1970	15	8	0.53
Brazil	1971	2	1	0.50
Total		92	77	0.84

== Honours ==
São Paulo state team

- Campeonato Brasileiro de Seleções Estaduais: 1959

Santos

- Campeonato Brasileiro Série A: 1961, 1962, 1963, 1964, 1965, 1968
- Copa Libertadores: 1962, 1963
- Intercontinental Cup: 1962, 1963
- Intercontinental Supercup: 1968
- Campeonato Paulista: 1958, 1960, 1961, 1962, 1964, 1965, 1967, 1968, 1969, 1973 (Note: The 1973 Paulista was held jointly with Portuguesa.)
- Torneio Rio-São Paulo: 1959, 1963, 1964, (Note: The 1964 Torneio Rio-São Paulo was held jointly with Botafogo) 1966

New York Cosmos

- North American Soccer League, Soccer Bowl: 1977
- North American Soccer League, Atlantic Conference Championship: 1977

Brazil

- FIFA World Cup: 1958, 1962, 1970
- Roca Cup: 1957, 1963
- Taça Oswaldo Cruz: 1958, 1962, 1968
- Copa Bernardo O'Higgins: 1959
- Taça do Atlântico: 1960

Individual

In December 2000, Pelé and Diego Maradona shared the prize of FIFA Player of the Century. The award was originally intended to be based upon votes in an online poll. However, when it became apparent that the poll favoured Maradona due to a wave of voting by his fans, a committee of FIFA members was appointed to choose the winner, along with readers of the FIFA magazine. The committee chose Pelé. Since Maradona was winning the Internet poll, however, it was decided he and Pelé should share the award.

- Campeonato Paulista Top Scorer: 1957, 1958, 1959, 1960, 1961, 1962, 1963, 1964, 1965, 1969, 1973
- FIFA World Cup Best Young Player: 1958
- FIFA World Cup Silver Ball: 1958
- France Football's Ballon d'Or: 1958, 1959, 1960, 1961, 1963, 1964, 1970 (Le nouveau palmarès - The new list of winners)
- South American Championship Best Player: 1959
- South American Championship Top Scorer: 1959
- Copa Bernardo O'Higgins Top Scorer: 1959 (shared with Quarentinha)
- Gol de Placa: 1961
- Campeonato Brasileiro Série A Top Scorer: 1961, 1963, 1964
- Intercontinental Cup Top Scorer: 1962, 1963 (Note: Attributed to multiple references:)
- Torneio Rio-São Paulo Top Scorer: 1963
- Copa Libertadores Top Scorer: 1965
- BBC Overseas Sports Personality of the Year: 1970
- Bola de Prata: 1970
- FIFA World Cup Golden Ball: 1970
- South American Footballer of the Year: 1973
- North American Soccer League (NASL) All-Star team: 1975, 1976, 1977
- NASL Top Assist Provider: 1976
- NASL Most Valuable Player: 1976
- Number 10 retired by the New York Cosmos: 1977
- Citizen of the World, United Nations: 1977
- International Peace Award: 1978
- Sports Champion of the Century, L'Équipe: 1981
- U.S. National Soccer Hall of Fame: 1992
- Goodwill Ambassador, UNESCO: 1993
- Winner of France Football's World Cup Top-100 1930–1990: 1994
- Marca Leyenda: 1997
- World Team of the 20th Century: 1998
- Football Player of the Century, elected by France Football's Ballon d'Or Winners: 1999
- 100 Most Important People of the 20th century, TIME: One of the : 1999
- Greatest Player of the 20th Century, World Soccer: 1999
- Athlete of the Century, Reuters: 1999
- Athlete of the Century, International Olympic Committee: 1999
- World Player of the Century, IFFHS: 2000
- South American Player of the Century, IFFHS: 2000
- FIFA Player of the Century: 2000
- Laureus Lifetime Achievement Award: 2000
- FIFA 100 Greatest Living Footballers: 2004
- BBC Sports Personality of the Year Lifetime Achievement Award: 2005
- Brazilian Player of the Century, IFFHS: 2000
- FIFA Presidential Award: 2007
- Greatest Football Player, Golden Foot: 2012
- FIFA Ballon d'Or Prix d'Honneur: 2013
- World Soccer Greatest XI of All Time: 2013
- Legends of Football Award: 2013
- South America's Best Player in History, L'Équipe: 2015
- Inspiration Award, GQ: 2017
- Global Citizen Award, World Economic Forum: 2018
- FWA Tribute Award: 2018
- Ballon d'Or Dream Team: 2020
- IFFHS All-time Men's Dream Team: 2021
- IFFHS South America Men's Team of All Time: 2021
- Player of History Award: 2022
- FIFA Best Special Award: 2022

Orders

- Knight of the Order of Rio Branco: 1967
- Commander of the Order of Rio Branco: 1969
- Officer of the Order of Ouissam Alaouite of the Kingdom of Morocco: 1976
- Order of Champions, Organization of Catholic Youth in the USA: 1978
- Order of Merit of South America, CONMEBOL: 1984
- FIFA Order of Merit: 1984
- National Order of Merit, Brazil: 1991
- Cross of the Order of the Republic of Hungary: 1994
- Order of Military Merit, Brazil: 1995
- Knight Commander of the Order of the British Empire: 1997
- Order of Cultural Merit, Brazil: 2004
- FIFA Centennial Award: 2004
- Olympic Order, International Olympic Committee: 2016

Records

- Highest goals-per-game ratio for Brazil national football team: 0.84
- Highest goals-per-game ratio of any South American top international scorer: 0.84
- Highest goals-per-game ratio of any leading scorer in the Intercontinental Cup: 2.33
- Most goals in the Intercontinental Cup: 7
- Most goals for Santos in competitive matches: 643
- Most goals for Santos, including friendlies: 1091
- Most appearances for Santos: 1116
- Most goals within a single Brazilian top-level league season: 58
- Most goals in a single Campeonato Paulista season: 58
- Most goals in a single Campeonato Paulista match: 8 (1964)
- Most goals in Campeonato Paulista history: 466
- Most seasons as Campeonato Paulista Top Scorer: 11
- Most consecutive seasons as Campeonato Paulista Top Scorer: 9 (1957–1965)
- Most goals in a calendar year (including friendlies, recognised by FIFA): 127 (1959)
- RSSSF record for most top-level goals in a season (including friendlies): 120 (1959)
- RSSSF record for most seasons with over 100 top-level goals (including friendlies): 3 (1959, 1961, 1965)
- RSSSF record for most goals before the age of 30: 675
- RSSSF record for most top-level career goals (including friendlies): 1,274
- Guinness World Record for most career goals in world football (including friendlies): 1,283
- IFFHS record for most top-division league goals: 604
- IFFHS record for most top-level domestic goals: 659
- Guinness World Record for most hat-tricks in world football: 92
- Most hat-tricks for Brazil: 7
- Most World Cup winners' medals: 3 (1958, 1962, 1970)
- Youngest winner of a World Cup: age 17 years and 249 days (1958)
- Youngest goalscorer in a World Cup: age 17 years and 239 days (1958)
- Youngest player to score a hat-trick in a FIFA World Cup: age 17 years and 244 days (1958)
- Youngest player to play in a FIFA World Cup final: age 17 years and 249 days (1958)
- Youngest goalscorer in a FIFA World Cup Final: age 17 years and 249 days (1958)
- Youngest player to debut for the Brazil national football team: age 16 years and 259 days (1957)
- Youngest player to play for Brazil in a FIFA World Cup: age 17 years and 234 days
- Youngest goalscorer for Brazil national football team: age 16 years and 259 days (1957)
- Youngest Top Scorer in the Campeonato Paulista
- First teenager to score in a FIFA World Cup Final
- Most assists provided in World Cup Final matches: 3 (1 in 1958 and 2 in 1970)
- Most assists provided in World Cup knockout stages: 6 (shared with Lionel Messi)
- Most World Cup goal contributions for Brazil
- Most goals in the Copa Bernardo O'Higgins: 3 (shared with Quarentinha)
- Only player to reach 25 international goals as a teenager
- Only player to have scored a hat-trick in the Intercontinental Cup
- Only player to have scored a hat-trick in the Copa Bernardo O'Higgins

== See also ==
- List of Brazil national football team hat-tricks
- List of international goals scored by Pelé
- List of international hat-tricks scored by Pelé
- List of men's footballers with 500 or more goals
- List of men's footballers with 50 or more international goals
- Pelé runaround move
- Torcida Jovem of Santos FC School of Samba
- Mononymous person

== Bibliography ==
- Bar-On, Tamir (2014). The World Through Soccer: The Cultural Impact of a Global Sport. Rowman & Littlefield. ISBN 978-1442234734.
- Bellos, Alex (2003). Futebol: The Brazilian Way of Life. Bloomsbury. ISBN 0747561796.
- Blevins, David (2011). The Sports Hall of Fame Encyclopedia: Baseball, Basketball, Football, Hockey, Soccer. Scarecrow Press. ISBN 978-0810861305.
- Darby, Paul (2002). Africa, Football, and FIFA: Politics, Colonialism, and Resistance. Taylor & Francis. ISBN 0714649686.
- Dunmore, Tom (2011). Historical Dictionary of Soccer. Scarecrow Press. ISBN 978-0810873957.
- Dunmore, Tom (2015). Encyclopedia of the FIFA World Cup. Scarecrow Press. ISBN 978-0810887435.
- "World's Highest Paid Athlete: Brazilian Soccer Star Earns $150,000 a Year". Ebony. Johnson Publishing Company. 1963. OCLC 1567306.
- Freedman, Lew (2014). Pelé: A Biography. ABC-CLIO. ISBN 978-1440829819.
- Heizer, Teixeira (1997). O jogo bruto das copas do mundo (in Brazilian Portuguese). Mauad Editora Ltda. ISBN 8585756527.
- Magill, Frank Northen (1999). Dictionary of World Biography: The 20th century, O–Z. Routledge. ISBN 1579580483.
- Marcus, Joe (1976). The World of Pelé. Mason Charter Publishing. p. 200. ISBN 0884053660.
- Pelé; Fish, Robert L. (1977). My Life and the Beautiful Game: The Autobiography of Pelé. Doubleday Publishing. ISBN 0385121857.
- Pelé (2008). Pelé: The Autobiography. Simon and Schuster. ISBN 978-1847394880.

FIFA World Cup
Preceded by Héctor Facundo	Opening goal 1966	Succeeded by Dinko Dermendzhiev
Preceded by Pinga	Jersey number 10 for Brazil	Succeeded by Rivellino
Political offices
New ministerial post	Minister of Sports; 1 January 1995 – 30 April 1998	Vacant Title next held by Rafael Greca as Minister of Sports and Tourism

Preceded by Rod Laver	BBC Overseas Sports Personality of the Year; 1970	Succeeded by Lee Trevino
