= Joshua Nascimento =

Brazilian footballer (born 1996)

Personal information
- Full name: Joshua Seixas Arantes do Nascimento
- Date of birth: 28 September 1996 (age 30)
- Place of birth: São Paulo, Brazil
- Height: 1.73 m (5 ft 8 in)
- Position: Forward

Team information
- Current team: FC Dallas (Academy Head of Performance)

Youth career
- 2011–2013: Florida Rush
- 2013–2015: Santos

College career
Years	Team	Apps	(Gls)
2015–2018	Tampa Spartans	1	(0)

Joshua Seixas Arantes do Nascimento (born 28 September 1996) is a Brazilian professional football coach and former player who played as a forward. He is Academy Head of Performance at Major League Soccer club FC Dallas.

== Early and personal life ==
Nascimento was born to Brazilian gospel singer Assíria Seixas Lemos and Brazilian football legend Pelé. He has a twin sister named Celeste.

On 16 September 2023, he married businesswoman Bárbara Meireles. A year later, in September 2024, the pair announced they were expecting a daughter, Cecília.

== Playing career ==
=== Early career ===
At the age of ten, he trained with Santos, the club where his father made his name, for the first time. He moved to the United States at the age of twelve, and joined the academy side Florida Rush three years later.

He returned to Brazil in 2013, joining Santos on a permanent deal. While at Santos, he refused to wear his father's famous number 10 shirt, and attempted to ignore comparisons between himself and his father, stating "he was him and I am me." He made his debut for the Santos under-20 side in October 2014.

=== Collegiate soccer ===
Having suffered numerous injuries while at Santos, Nascimento returned to the United States to enroll at the University of Tampa in 2015. However, his time in Tampa was also marred by injury, and he was redshirted in his first season with the university's soccer team, the Tampa Spartans. He made one appearance in 2016, but this would be his only playing time until his graduation in 2018.

== Coaching career ==
Having been raised mostly in the United States, he decided to remain there following his decision not to pursue a career in professional football, and he was named as a representative for Santos in North America in 2020. He joined the SIMA Pre-Academy, a soccer academy for children, in 2021. He has also worked as a fitness instructor and soccer coach in soccer academies across Orlando, as well as completing an internship in the Santos academy physiology department.

Having graduated university with a Bachelor of Science in human performance and exercise physiology, Nascimento had an internship with Belgian football team Royale Union Saint-Gilloise in March 2022, in the hope of working as a physical trainer.

He worked as a physical trainer at the Soccer Institute of the Montverde Academy, before joining Major League Soccer club FC Dallas as the Head of Performance for their academy.
