= Taça Oswaldo Cruz =

- Organiser(s): (Brazil) CBD (Paraguay) APF
- Founded: 1950
- Abolished: 1976; 49 years ago
- Region: South America
- Teams: 2
- Related competitions: Copa Roca
- Last champions: Brazil (1976)
- Most championships: Brazil (8 titles)

The Taça Oswaldo Cruz (English: Oswaldo Cruz Cup) was a football tournament played between the national teams of Brazil and Paraguay, and contested from 1950 to 1976, albeit irregularly. It was organised by the Brazilian Sports Confederation and the Paraguayan Football Association with the purpose of promoting sporting exchange between the two countries.

The trophy was named after Oswaldo Cruz, a Brazilian physician, pioneer bacteriologist and epidemiologist, and founder of the Oswaldo Cruz Institute.

The competition was played in a two-legged format, with all the editions being won by Brazil. From a total of 16 matches in 8 editions contested, Brazil won 11, with Paraguay only winning once.

== List of Champions ==
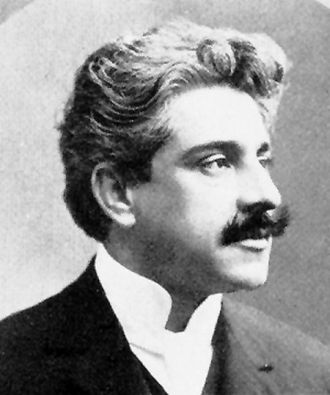
The cup was named after Oswaldo Cruz (1872–1917), Brazilian scientist and epidemiologist.

Ed.	Year	Champion	1st. leg	City	2nd. leg	City	Result (points)
1	1950	Brazil	2–0	Rio de Janeiro	3–3	São Paulo	3–1
2	1955	Brazil	3–0	Rio de Janeiro	3–3	São Paulo	3–1
3	1956	Brazil	2–0	Asunción	5–2	Asunción	4–0
4	1958	Brazil	5–1	Rio de Janeiro	0–0	São Paulo	3–1
5	1961	Brazil	2–0	Asunción	3–2	Asunción	4–0
6	1962	Brazil	6–0	Rio de Janeiro	4–0	São Paulo	4–0
7	1968	Brazil	4–0	Asunción	0–1	Asunción	2–2 (4–1 g.d.)
8	1976	Brazil	1–1	Asunción	3–1	Rio de Janeiro	3–1

== Titles ==
Team	Won
Brazil	8
Paraguay	0
