= Dondinho =

Brazilian footballer (1917–1996)

- Dondinho with Atletico Mineiro, c. 1941

Personal information
- Full name: João Ramos do Nascimento
- Date of birth: 2 October 1917
- Place of birth: Campos Gerais, Minas Gerais, Brazil
- Date of death: 16 November 1996 (aged 79)
- Place of death: São Paulo, São Paulo, Brazil
- Height: 6 ft 0 in (1.83 m)
- Position: Striker

Youth career
- 1933–1935: Atlético Mineiro

Senior career*
Years	Team	Apps	(Gls)
	Yuracan-MG	1+	(5+)
- Hepacaré
1940	Atlético Mineiro	1	(0)
1940–1942	Atlético Três Corações		
1942–1944	Fluminense-MG		
1944	Sport São Lourenço-MG		
1944–1946	Fluminense-MG		
1946–1952	Bauru	199	(137)
- * Club domestic league appearances and goals

João Ramos do Nascimento (2 October 1917 – 16 November 1996), nicknamed Dondinho, was a Brazilian footballer who played as a centre forward. He was the father, mentor and trainer of Pelé. During his own playing career, Dondinho played for a number of clubs, including Atlético Mineiro. He became known as "Maleável" due to his ability to score headers.

== Club career ==
In 1933 Dondinho joined Atletico Mineiro playing for its youth section until 1935. He then started his senior career with Yuracan in the Itajuba championship. In 1940 he returned to Atletico Mineiro, but did not play a lot after suffering a serious knee injury.

=== Record ===
In 1938 Dondinho scored 5 goals with headers in Yuracan's 6–2 win against their arch-rivals Smart Futebol Clube in the 1939 regional Interior Championship of Itajubá, Minas Gerais. He became the second player to achieve this feat, after Fred Roberts did it 7 years before. Later in 1972, Dušan Bajević also scored five headed goals for Yugoslavia against Venezuela.

== Death and tributes ==
He died of heart failure at the age of 79, on November 16, 1996.

On September 15, 2012, the statue "Monumento ao Dondinho" was erected in the João Ramos do Nascimento Municipal Park in Bauru. The approximately 5 meter statue depicts Dondinho and Pelé as children. The artist used cement, plaster and iron and created the work in less than 2 months.

== Honors ==
- 1939 Itajubense Football Championship (Sociedade Desportiva Yuracan Futebol Clube)
- 1941 Guaraína Cup (Atlético Clube Três Corações)
- 1946 Amateur Champion of the state of São Paulo (Bauru Atlético Clube)

== In popular culture ==
=== Filmography ===
- 1965: O Rei Pelé
- 2004: Pelé Eterno
- 2016: Pelé: Birth of a Legend

== Misconceptions ==
A viral internet rumor frequently attributes an unverified career statistic of 893 goals in 775 matches to Dondinho. Additionally, some online sources claim he scored 19 goals in 6 matches for the Brazil national football team; however, Dondinho never represented Brazil at the international level.
