= Lists of hat-tricks =

These are lists of hat-tricks:

== General ==
- List of All-Ireland Senior Hurling Championship hat-tricks
- List of One Day International cricket hat-tricks
- List of Rugby League World Cup hat-tricks
- List of Rugby Union World Cup hat-tricks
- List of Six Nations Championship hat-tricks
- List of Test cricket hat-tricks
- List of Twenty20 International cricket hat-tricks
- List of women's international cricket hat-tricks

== Football competitions ==
- List of A-League Men hat-tricks
- List of Allsvenskan hat-tricks
- List of Brunei Super League hat-tricks
- List of Bundesliga hat-tricks
- List of AFC Champions League Elite hat-tricks
- List of CAF Champions League hat-tricks
- List of Chinese Super League hat-tricks
- List of CONCACAF Champions League hat-tricks
- List of Conmebol Copa Libertadores hat-tricks
- List of EFL Championship hat-tricks
- List of EFL League One hat-tricks
- List of EFL League Two hat-tricks
- List of Egyptian Premier League hat-tricks
- List of El Clásico hat-tricks
- List of Eliteserien hat-tricks
- List of Eredivisie hat-tricks
- FA Cup hat-tricks
- List of FA WSL hat-tricks
- List of FA Youth Cup and FA Girls' Youth Cup hat-tricks
- List of FIFA Club World Cup hat-tricks
- List of Hong Kong Premier League hat-tricks
- List of I-League hat-tricks
- List of Indian Super League hat-tricks
- List of Indian Women's League hat-tricks
- List of Indonesia Super League hat-tricks
- List of Intercontinental Cup hat-tricks
- List of Iraqi Premier League hat-tricks
- List of Kategoria Superiore hat-tricks
- List of La Liga hat-tricks
- List of Ligue 1 hat-tricks
- List of Major League Soccer hat-tricks
- List of National Women's Soccer League hat-tricks
- List of OFC Champions League hat-tricks
- List of Perú Liga 1 hat-tricks
- List of Premier League hat-tricks
- List of Premier Soccer League hat-tricks
- List of Primeira Liga hat-tricks
- List of Prva HNL hat-tricks
- List of Saudi Pro League hat-tricks
- List of Scottish Premier League hat-tricks
- List of Scottish Professional Football League hat-tricks
- List of Serie A hat-tricks
- List of Tahiti Cup hat-tricks
- List of Tahiti Ligue 1 hat-tricks
- List of Tanzanian Premier League hat-tricks
- List of TT Pro League hat-tricks
- List of UEFA Champions League hat-tricks
  - UEFA European Cup hat-tricks
- List of UEFA Europa League hat-tricks
- List of UEFA Super Cup hat-tricks
- List of Women's Super League hat-tricks

== International football ==
- List of AFC Asian Cup hat-tricks
- List of AFF Championship hat-tricks
- List of Africa Cup of Nations hat-tricks
- List of Africa Women Cup of Nations hat-tricks
- List of African Nations Championship hat-tricks
- List of Argentina national football team hat-tricks
- List of Australia national soccer team hat-tricks
- List of Belgium national football team hat-tricks
- List of Brazil national football team hat-tricks
- List of Canada men's national soccer team hat-tricks
- List of CONCACAF Championship hat-tricks
- List of CONCACAF Women's Championship hat-tricks
- List of CONCACAF Gold Cup hat-tricks
- List of Copa América hat-tricks
- List of Croatia national football team hat-tricks
- List of Denmark national football team hat-tricks
- List of England national football team hat-tricks
- List of FIFA Confederations Cup hat-tricks
- List of FIFA Women's World Cup hat-tricks
- List of FIFA World Cup hat-tricks
- List of France national football team hat-tricks
- List of Germany national football team hat-tricks
- List of Hungary national football team hat-tricks
- List of India national football team hat-tricks
- List of India women's national football team hat-tricks
- List of Iran national football team hat-tricks
- List of Italy national football team hat-tricks
- List of Japan national football team hat-tricks
- List of Kosovo national football team hat-tricks
- List of men's Olympic football tournament hat-tricks
- List of North American Nations Cup hat-tricks
- List of OFC Nations Cup hat-tricks
- List of Philippines national football team hat-tricks
- List of Portugal national football team hat-tricks
- List of Republic of Ireland national football team hat-tricks
- List of Romania national football team hat-tricks
- List of Scotland national football team hat-tricks
- List of South Africa national football team hat-tricks
- List of Spain national football team hat-tricks
- List of UEFA European Championship hat-tricks
- List of United States men's national soccer team hat-tricks
- List of United States women's national soccer team hat-tricks
- List of Uruguay national football team hat-tricks
- List of Wales national football team hat-tricks

== Footballers ==
- List of hat-tricks scored by Lionel Messi
- List of hat-tricks scored by Cristiano Ronaldo
- List of international hat-tricks scored by Ali Daei
- List of international hat-tricks scored by Erling Haaland
- List of international hat-tricks scored by Amber Hearn
- List of international hat-tricks scored by Zlatan Ibrahimović
- List of international hat-tricks scored by Harry Kane
- List of international hat-tricks scored by Robert Lewandowski
- List of international hat-tricks scored by Romelu Lukaku
- List of international hat-tricks scored by Kylian Mbappé
- List of international hat-tricks scored by Lionel Messi
- List of international hat-tricks scored by Neymar
- List of international hat-tricks scored by Pauleta
- List of international hat-tricks scored by Pelé
- List of international hat-tricks scored by Cristiano Ronaldo
- List of international hat-tricks scored by Christine Sinclair
- List of international hat-tricks scored by Sven Rydell
- List of international hat-tricks scored by Kelly Smith
- List of international hat-tricks scored by Davor Šuker
- List of international hat-tricks scored by David Villa
- List of international hat-tricks scored by Ellen White
- List of international hat-tricks scored by Chris Wood
