= List of World Cup hat-tricks =

List of World Cup hat-tricks may refer to:

- List of FIFA World Cup hat-tricks
- List of FIFA Women's World Cup hat-tricks
- List of Rugby World Cup hat-tricks
- List of Rugby League World Cup hat-tricks

== See also ==
- List of One Day International cricket hat-tricks, including those taken in a World Cup
- List of Twenty20 International cricket hat-tricks, including those taken in a World Cup
