= List of A-League Men hat-tricks =

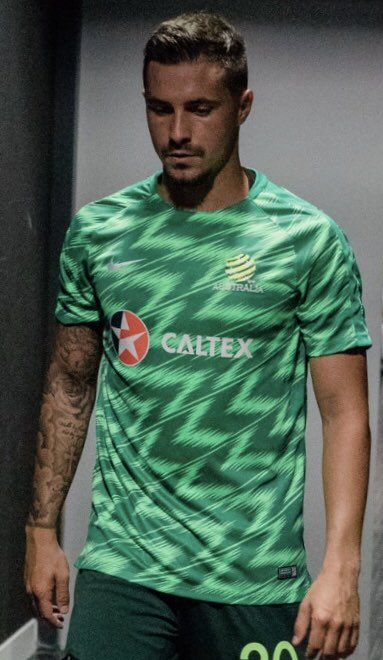
Jamie Maclaren scored a record eight A-League Men hat-tricks: for Perth Glory (1), Brisbane Roar (2), and Melbourne City (5).

The A-League Men is the top and only professional men's soccer league in Australia. Since its inaugural season in 2005–06, more than thirty individual players have scored hat-tricks in A-League Men matches, including five players who have scored four or more goals in a match.

== Statistics ==
- The first hat-trick was scored by Ante Milicic for Newcastle Jets in a win over New Zealand Knights.
- Jamie Maclaren has scored the most hat-tricks, with eight.
- In the 2007 A-League Grand Final, Archie Thompson scored five goals in Melbourne Victory's win over Adelaide United.
- Two hat-tricks have been scored in a single match on two occasions. The first was when Marcos Flores and Sergio van Dijk both scored three goals for Adelaide United against North Queensland Fury in January 2011. The second was when Jamie Maclaren scored three goals for Melbourne City and Roy O'Donovan scored three goals for Brisbane Roar in November 2019.
- Shane Smeltz and Bobô are the only players to have scored hat-tricks in consecutive matches.
- Brody Burkitt, Henrique and Adrian Segecic are the only players to have scored a hat-trick after coming on as a substitute.
- Besart Berisha holds the record for the fastest hat-trick, scoring three goals in six minutes for Brisbane Roar against Adelaide United.

== Hat-tricks ==
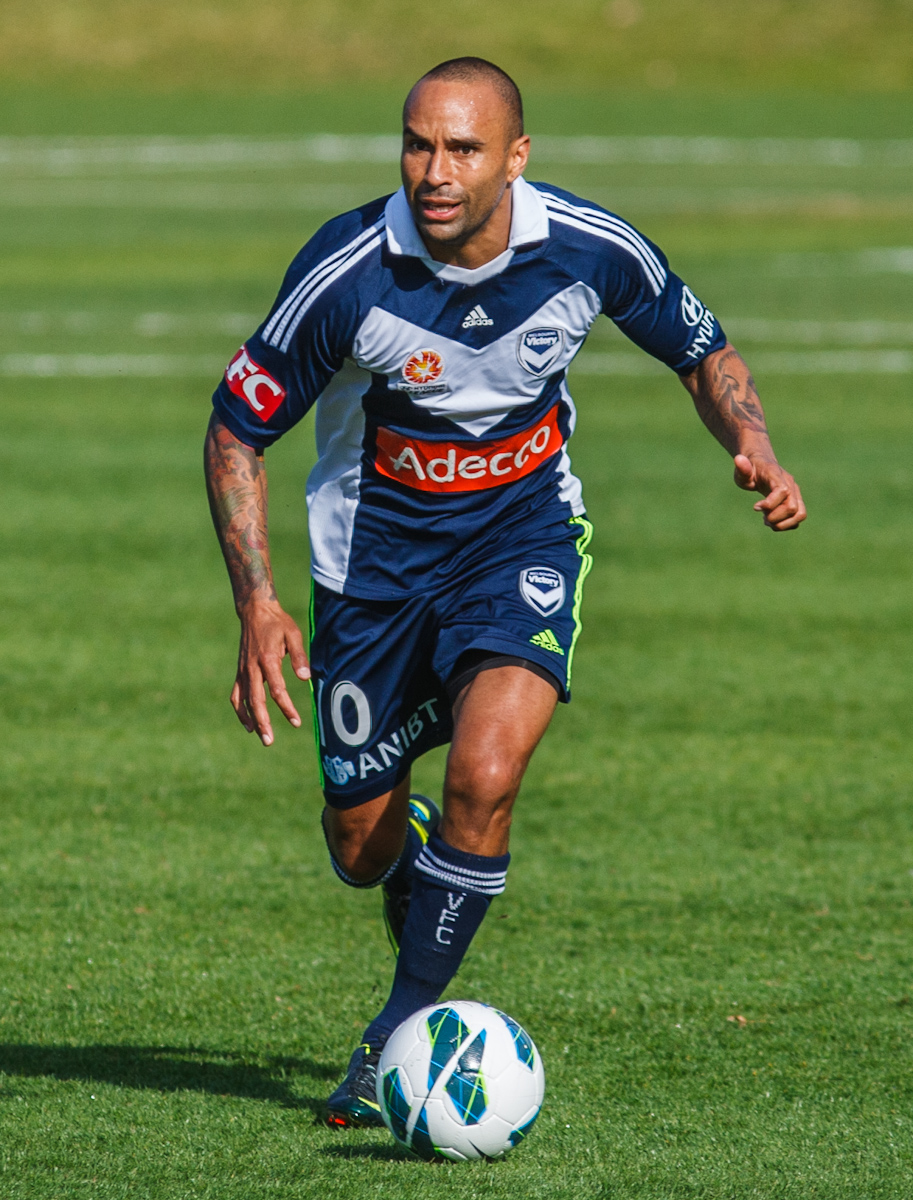
Archie Thompson scored five goals in the 2007 A-League Grand Final.

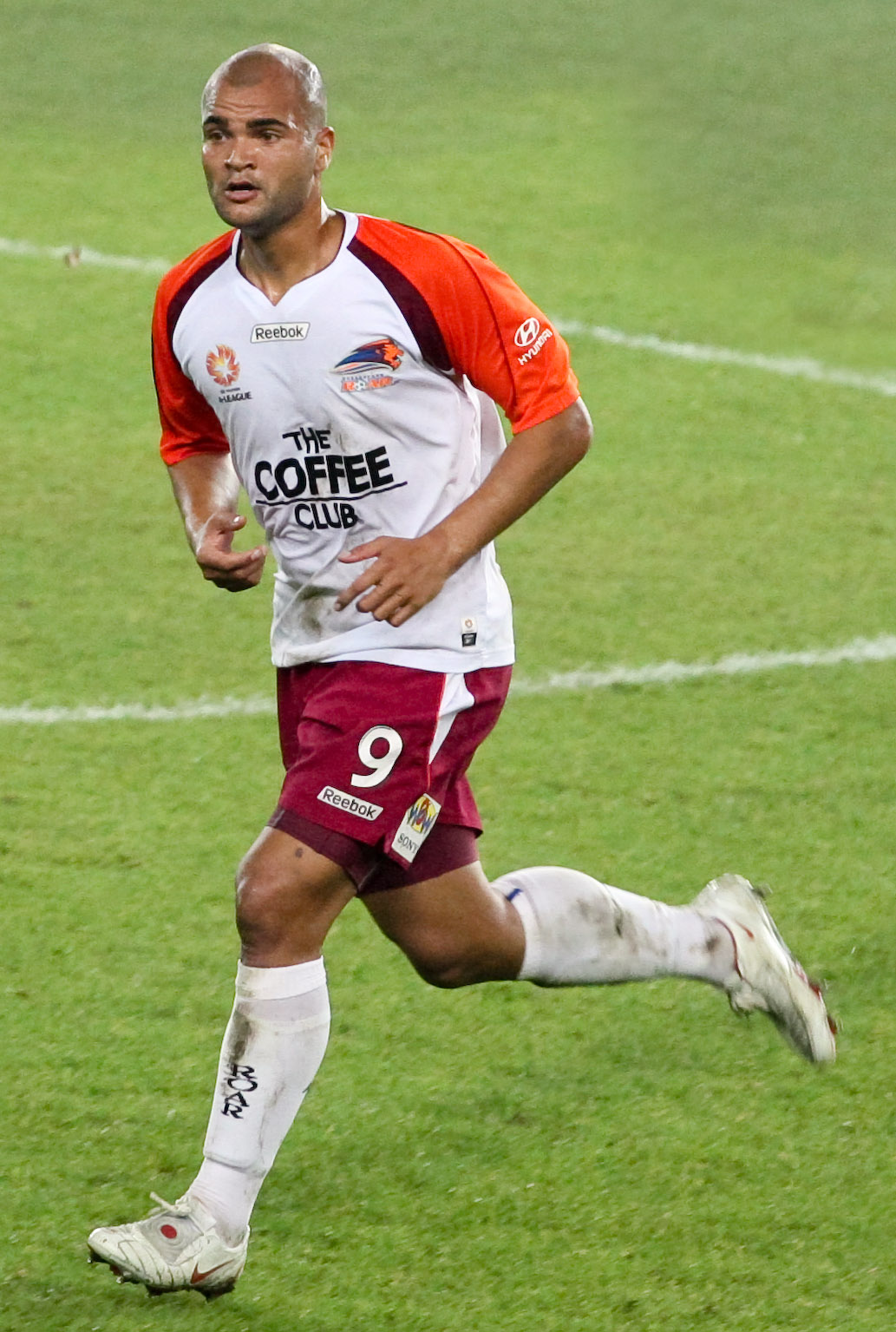
Sergio van Dijk became the first non-Australian player in the A-League Men to score a hat-trick in January 2009.

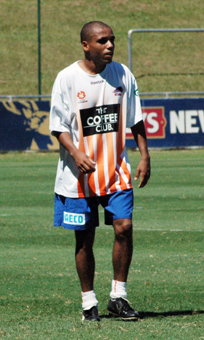
Henrique became the first player in the A-League Men to score a hat-trick as a substitute in November 2014.

Key
^{4}	Player scored four goals
^{5}	Player scored five goals
†	Player scored hat-trick as a substitute
*	The home team

Player	Nationality (Note: As at the time of the hat-trick)	For	Against	Result (Note: The result is presented with the home team's score first.)	Date	Ref.
Ante Milicic	Australia	Newcastle Jets	New Zealand Knights*	2–4	4 November 2005	
Sasho Petrovski	Australia	Sydney FC	Central Coast Mariners*	1–5	5 November 2005	
Damian Mori	Australia	Perth Glory	Adelaide United*	2–4	6 November 2005	
Jamie Harnwell	Australia	Perth Glory*	New Zealand Knights	4–1	26 November 2006	
Nathan Burns	Australia	Adelaide United	Central Coast Mariners*	1–3	21 January 2007	
Archie Thompson^{5}	Australia	Melbourne Victory*	Adelaide United	6–0	18 February 2007	
Billy Celeski	Australia	Perth Glory	Sydney FC*	2–4	15 December 2007	
Matt Thompson	Australia	Newcastle Jets*	Melbourne Victory	4–2	19 December 2008	
Sergio van Dijk (Note: Result occurred before van Dijk was naturalized to Indonesian in February 2013.)	Netherlands	Queensland Roar*	Sydney FC	3–1	17 January 2009	
Shane Smeltz^{4}	New Zealand	Gold Coast United*	North Queensland Fury	5–0	15 August 2009	
Shane Smeltz	New Zealand	Gold Coast United*	Brisbane Roar	5–1	26 December 2009	
Robbie Kruse	Australia	Melbourne Victory*	Perth Glory	6–2	16 January 2010	
Robbie Fowler	England	Perth Glory*	Melbourne Victory	3–1	14 November 2010	
Sergio van Dijk	Netherlands	Adelaide United*	North Queensland Fury	8–1	21 January 2011	
Marcos Flores	Argentina	Adelaide United*	North Queensland Fury	8–1	21 January 2011	
Bruce Djite	Australia	Gold Coast United*	Newcastle Jets	5–1	22 January 2011	
Besart Berisha^{4}	Albania	Brisbane Roar*	Adelaide United	7–1	28 October 2011	
Shane Smeltz^{4}	New Zealand	Perth Glory*	Melbourne Victory	4–2	24 March 2012	
Shane Smeltz	New Zealand	Perth Glory*	Melbourne Heart	3–0	1 April 2012	
Daniel McBreen	Australia	Central Coast Mariners*	Sydney FC	7–2	3 November 2012	
Mark Bridge	Australia	Western Sydney Wanderers*	Adelaide United	6–1	21 December 2012	
Alessandro Del Piero^{4}	Italy	Sydney FC*	Wellington Phoenix	7–1	19 January 2013	
Michael McGlinchey	New Zealand	Central Coast Mariners*	Melbourne Victory	6–2	23 February 2013	
Adam Taggart	Australia	Newcastle Jets*	Melbourne Heart	3–1	24 November 2013	
Dimitri Petratos	Australia	Brisbane Roar	Sydney FC*	2–5	26 December 2013	
David Williams	Australia	Melbourne Heart	Wellington Phoenix*	0–5	16 February 2014	
Sergio Cirio	Spain	Adelaide United	Melbourne Victory*	4–3	22 February 2014	
Andy Keogh	Ireland	Perth Glory*	Brisbane Roar	3–2	19 October 2014	
Besart Berisha	Albania	Melbourne Victory*	Melbourne City	5–2	25 October 2014	
Henrique†	Brazil	Brisbane Roar	Newcastle Jets*	0–4	14 November 2014	
Nathan Burns	Australia	Wellington Phoenix*	Melbourne City	5–1	30 November 2014	
Archie Thompson	Australia	Melbourne Victory*	Sydney FC	3–3	13 December 2014	
Robert Koren	Slovenia	Melbourne City	Newcastle Jets*	2–5	30 December 2014	
Marc Janko	Austria	Sydney FC*	Brisbane Roar	5–4	15 March 2015	
Steven Lustica	Australia	Brisbane Roar*	Central Coast Mariners	6–1	2 April 2015	
Jamie Maclaren	Australia	Perth Glory*	Melbourne City	3–1	19 April 2015	
Blake Powell^{4}	Australia	Wellington Phoenix	Western Sydney Wanderers*	2–5	14 February 2016	
Bruno Fornaroli	Uruguay	Melbourne City*	Sydney FC	3–0	5 March 2016	
Jamie Maclaren	Australia	Brisbane Roar*	Melbourne Victory	5–0	12 March 2016	
Romeo Castelen	Netherlands	Western Sydney Wanderers*	Brisbane Roar	5–4	25 April 2016	
Andy Keogh	Ireland	Perth Glory	Melbourne City*	2–3	21 October 2016	
Besart Berisha	Albania	Melbourne Victory*	Wellington Phoenix	6–1	31 October 2016	
Besart Berisha	Albania	Melbourne Victory	Western Sydney Wanderers*	0–3	10 December 2016	
Brendon Santalab	Australia	Western Sydney Wanderers*	Melbourne City	3–1	24 March 2017	
Jamie Maclaren	Australia	Brisbane Roar*	Central Coast Mariners	5–1	2 April 2017	
Roy O'Donovan	Ireland	Newcastle Jets	Central Coast Mariners*	1–5	7 October 2017	
Bobô	Brazil	Sydney FC	Wellington Phoenix*	1–4	23 December 2017	
Bobô	Brazil	Sydney FC*	Perth Glory	6–0	30 December 2017	
Besart Berisha	Kosovo	Melbourne Victory*	Central Coast Mariners	5–2	18 March 2018	
Riley McGree	Australia	Newcastle Jets	Central Coast Mariners*	2–8	14 April 2018	
Alex Brosque	Australia	Sydney FC*	Central Coast Mariners	5–2	4 January 2019	
Kosta Barbarouses	New Zealand	Melbourne Victory	Brisbane Roar*	0–5	15 January 2019	
David Williams	Australia	Wellington Phoenix*	Newcastle Jets	4–1	31 March 2019	
Roy Krishna	Fiji	Wellington Phoenix*	Melbourne City	3–2	21 April 2019	
Jamie Maclaren	Australia	Melbourne City	Brisbane Roar*	4–3	17 November 2019	
Roy O'Donovan	Ireland	Brisbane Roar*	Melbourne City	4–3	17 November 2019	
Adam Le Fondre	England	Sydney FC*	Brisbane Roar	5–1	7 December 2019	
Max Burgess	Australia	Western United*	Central Coast Mariners	6–2	1 March 2020	
Jamie Maclaren	Australia	Melbourne City	Central Coast Mariners*	2–4	20 March 2020	
Matt Derbyshire	England	Macarthur FC*	Adelaide United	4–0	12 February 2021	
Tomi Juric	Australia	Adelaide United*	Central Coast Mariners	3–2	19 February 2021	
Jamie Maclaren^{5}	Australia	Melbourne City*	Melbourne Victory	7–0	17 April 2021	
Andy Keogh^{4}	Ireland	Perth Glory*	Western Sydney Wanderers	5–1	16 May 2021	
Adam Le Fondre	England	Sydney FC	Central Coast Mariners*	0–5	9 April 2022	
Beka Mikeltadze	Georgia	Newcastle Jets*	Perth Glory	6–1	10 April 2022	
Lachlan Wales	Australia	Western United*	Perth Glory	6–0	16 April 2022	
Richard van der Venne	Netherlands	Melbourne City*	Macarthur FC	6–1	4 February 2023	
Jamie Maclaren	Australia	Melbourne City	Western United*	1–3	22 April 2023	
Jason Cummings	Australia	Central Coast Mariners	Melbourne City*	1–6	3 June 2023	
Bruno Fornaroli^{4}	Australia	Melbourne Victory*	Newcastle Jets	5–3	29 October 2023	
Oskar Zawada	Poland	Wellington Phoenix*	Brisbane Roar	5–2	4 November 2023	
Bruno Fornaroli^{4}	Australia	Melbourne Victory	Western Sydney Wanderers*	3–4	10 December 2023	
Ángel Torres	Colombia	Central Coast Mariners	Melbourne City*	3–3	17 December 2023	
Jamie Maclaren	Australia	Melbourne City*	Brisbane Roar	8–1	28 December 2023	
Ulises Dávila	Mexico	Macarthur FC*	Western United	3–3	12 January 2024	
Hiroshi Ibusuki	Japan	Adelaide United	Sydney FC*	4–3	13 January 2024	
Valère Germain	France	Macarthur FC*	Western Sydney Wanderers	4–3	4 February 2024	
Nestory Irankunda	Australia	Adelaide United*	Western United	4–1	29 March 2024	
Tolgay Arslan	Germany	Melbourne City*	Perth Glory	8–0	14 April 2024	
Nicolas Milanovic	Australia	Western Sydney Wanderers*	Newcastle Jets	4–1	8 November 2024	
Joe Lolley	England	Sydney FC*	Perth Glory	3–0	8 January 2025	
Adrian Segecic†	Australia	Sydney FC*	Central Coast Mariners	4–1	11 January 2025	
Logan Rogerson	New Zealand	Auckland FC*	Wellington Phoenix	6–1	22 February 2025	
Marin Jakoliš	Croatia	Macarthur FC	Brisbane Roar*	1–5	4 April 2025	
Noah Botic	Australia	Western United*	Adelaide United	3–2	9 May 2025	
Alex Badolato	Australia	Newcastle Jets*	Melbourne Victory	5–2	24 October 2025	
Al Hassan Toure	Australia	Sydney FC	Newcastle Jets*	1–4	1 November 2025	
Tom Lawrence	Wales	Perth Glory	Melbourne City*	1–3	28 December 2025	
Nikos Vergos	Greece	Melbourne Victory*	Wellington Phoenix	5–1	29 December 2025	
Brody Burkitt†	Australia	Adelaide United	Brisbane Roar*	2–3	24 January 2026	
Clayton Taylor	Australia	Newcastle Jets	Adelaide United*	2–3	8 February 2026	
Al Hassan Toure	Australia	Sydney FC*	Central Coast Mariners	4–1	6 November 2026	

== Multiple hat-tricks ==
The following table lists the number of hat-tricks scored by players who have scored two or more hat-tricks.

Rank	Player	Hat-tricks
1	(Australia) Jamie Maclaren	8
2	(Albania) (Kosovo) Besart Berisha	5
3	(New Zealand) Shane Smeltz	4
4	(Republic of Ireland) Andy Keogh	3
4	(Uruguay) (Australia) Bruno Fornaroli	3
6	(Brazil) Bobô	2
6	(Australia) Nathan Burns	2
6	(England) Adam Le Fondre	2
6	(Republic of Ireland) Roy O'Donovan	2
6	(Australia) Archie Thompson	2
6	(Australia) Al Hassan Toure	2
6	(Netherlands) Sergio van Dijk	2
6	(Australia) David Williams	2

== See also ==
- A-League Golden Boot
- Lists of hat-tricks
