= List of Italy national football team hat-tricks =

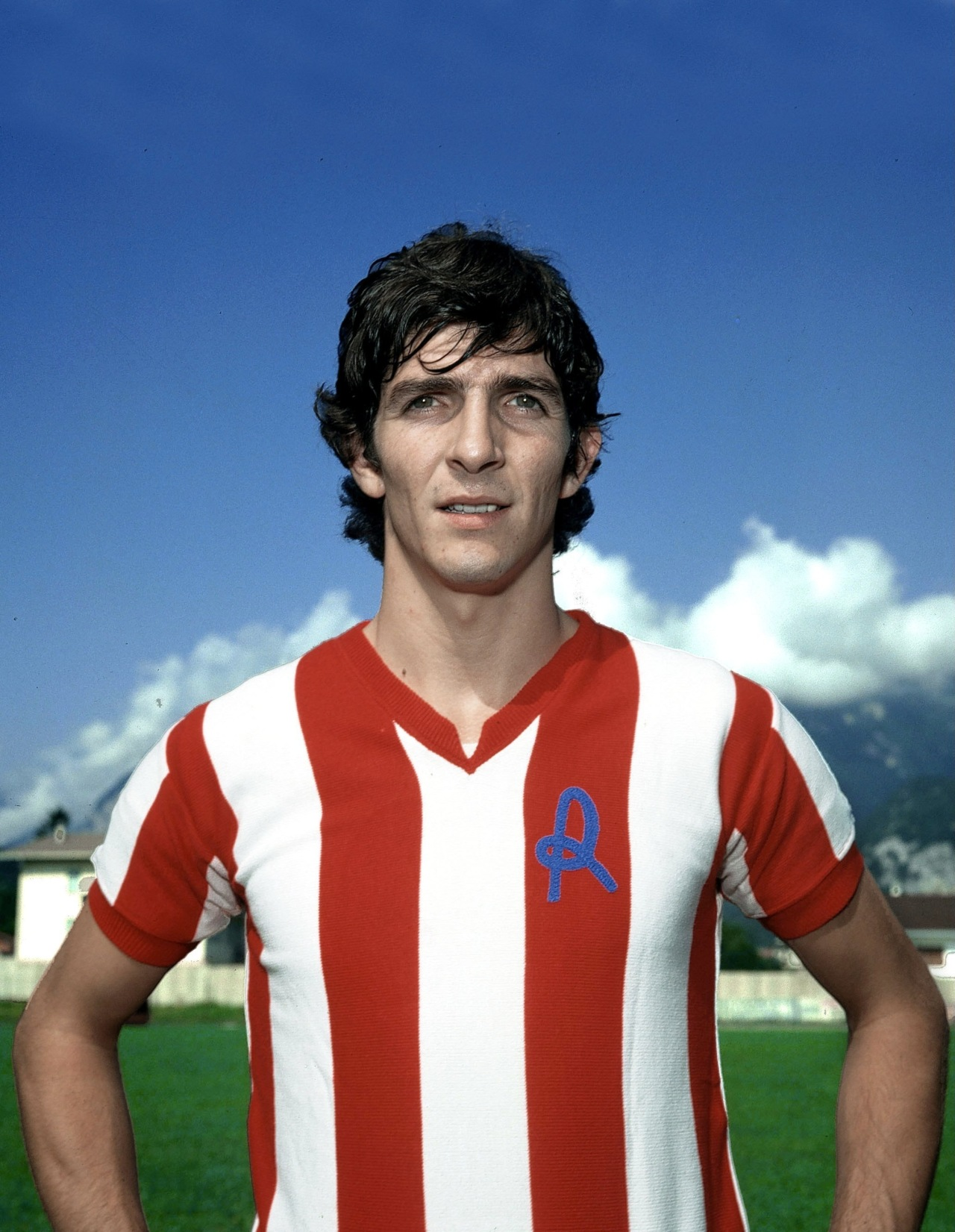
Paolo Rossi scored a hat-trick in the 3–2 victory against Brazil in the 1982 FIFA World Cup.

Since Italy's first international association football match in 1910, 26 footballers have scored a hat-trick for the national team.

The first player who scored a hat-trick was Pietro Lana in the 6–2 victory against France on 15 May 1910. The highest individual score in a single match is four goals, which has been achieved by six players: Carlo Biagi, Francesco Pernigo, Omar Sívori, Alberto Orlando, Gigi Riva, and Roberto Bettega. Five players have scored a hat-trick more than once, such as Giuseppe Meazza, Angelo Schiavio, Silvio Piola, Gigi Riva and Paolo Rossi. The highest number of hat-tricks in a single match is three, which occurred during the third place match concerning the 1928 Summer Olympics, related to Italy's 11–3 victory over Egypt where Angelo Schiavio, Elvio Banchero and Mario Magnozzi each scored three goals. Gigi Riva, with three hat-tricks, has scored the highest number of hat-tricks for Italy.

In the 1982 FIFA World Cup second group stage match, Italy won 3–2 against Brazil thanks to Paolo Rossi who scored a 'famous' hat-trick, allowing Italy to progress to the semi-finals. The most recent hat-trick in an official match was scored by Alberto Gilardino on 14 October 2009, during Italy's victory over Cyprus for the 2010 FIFA World Cup qualification.

Since 1912, Italy have conceded nine hat-tricks. On 17 March 1912, Eugène Maës was the first player to score a hat-trick against Italy in France's 4–3 victory. The last one was scored by Safet Sušić on 13 June 1979, during the 4–1 defeat against Yugoslavia, in a friendly match. John Hansen is the only player who scored four goals against Italy in a 4–1 defeat against Denmark, which took place on 5 August 1948.

== Hat-tricks scored by Italy ==
As of 22 June 2024

Results list Italy's goal tally first.

Hat-tricks scored by Italy
Player	Competition	Against	Venue	Result	Goals	Date	Ref(s)
Pietro Lana	Friendly	France	Arena Civica, Milan	6–2	3	15 May 1910	
Ermanno Aebi	Friendly	France	Velodromo Sempione, Milan	9–4	3	18 January 1920	
Guglielmo Brezzi	Friendly	France	Velodromo Sempione, Milan	9–4	3	18 January 1920	
Adolfo Baloncieri	Friendly	Switzerland	Parc des Sports, Geneva	5–1	3	30 January 1927	
Angelo Schiavio	1928 Summer Olympics	Egypt	Olympic Stadium, Amsterdam	11–3	3	9 June 1928	
Elvio Banchero	1928 Summer Olympics	Egypt	Olympic Stadium, Amsterdam	11–3	3	9 June 1928	
Mario Magnozzi	1928 Summer Olympics	Egypt	Olympic Stadium, Amsterdam	11–3	3	9 June 1928	
Gino Rossetti	1927–30 Central European International Cup	Czechoslovakia	Stadio Littoriale, Bologna	4–2	3	3 March 1929	
Giuseppe Meazza	1927–30 Central European International Cup	Hungary	Stadion Albert Flórián, Budapest	5–0	3	11 May 1930	
Giuseppe Meazza (2)	Friendly	France	Stadio Littoriale, Bologna	5–0	3	25 January 1931	
Francesco Fedullo	1931–32 Central European International Cup	Switzerland	Stadio Giorgio Ascarelli, Naples	3–0	3	14 February 1932	
Angelo Schiavio (2)	1934 FIFA World Cup	United States	Stadio Nazionale PNF, Rome	7–1	3	27 May 1934	
Carlo Biagi	1936 Summer Olympics	Japan	Mommsenstadion, Berlin	8–0	4	7 August 1936	
Annibale Frossi	1936 Summer Olympics	Japan	Mommsenstadion, Berlin	8–0	3	7 August 1936	
Silvio Piola	Friendly	Belgium	San Siro, Milan	6–1	3	15 May 1938	
Silvio Piola (2)	Friendly	Finland	Helsinki Olympic Stadium, Helsinki	3–2	3	20 July 1939	
Romeo Menti	Friendly	Switzerland	Stadio Comunale, Florence	5–2	3	27 April 1947	
Francesco Pernigo	1948 Summer Olympics	United States	Griffin Park, Brentford	9–0	4	2 August 1948	
Aredio Gimona	1952 Summer Olympics	United States	Ration Stadium, Tampere	8–0	3	16 July 1952	
Omar Sívori	1962 FIFA World Cup qualification	Israel	Stadio Comunale, Turin	6–0	4	4 November 1961	
Alberto Orlando	UEFA Euro 1964 qualifying	Turkey	Stadio Renato Dall'Ara, Bologna	6–0	4	2 December 1962	
Paolo Barison	1966 FIFA World Cup qualification	Poland	Stadio Olimpico, Rome	6–1	3	1 November 1965	
Gigi Riva	UEFA Euro 1968 qualifying	Cyprus	Stadio San Vito-Gigi Marulla, Cosenza	5–0	3	1 November 1967	
Gigi Riva (2)	1970 FIFA World Cup qualification	Wales	Stadio Olimpico, Rome	4–1	3	4 November 1969	
Gigi Riva (3)	1974 FIFA World Cup qualification	Luxembourg	Stadio Luigi Ferraris, Genoa	5–0	4	31 March 1973	
Roberto Bettega	1978 FIFA World Cup qualification	Finland	Stadio Comunale, Turin	6–1	4	15 October 1977	
Paolo Rossi	1982 FIFA World Cup	Brazil	Sarrià Stadium, Barcelona	3–2	3	5 July 1982	
Paolo Rossi (2)	Friendly	Mexico	Stadio Olimpico, Rome	5–0	3	4 February 1984	
Gianfranco Zola	UEFA Euro 1996 qualifying	Lithuania	Stadio Giglio, Reggio Emilia	4–0	3	15 November 1996	
Enrico Chiesa	FIGC Centenary	World XI	Stadio Olimpico, Rome	6–2	3	16 December 1998	
Filippo Inzaghi	UEFA Euro 2004 qualifying	Wales	San Siro, Milan	4–0	3	6 September 2003	
Luca Toni	2006 FIFA World Cup qualification	Belarus	Dinamo Stadium, Minsk	4–1	3	7 September 2005	
Alberto Gilardino	2010 FIFA World Cup qualification	Cyprus	Stadio Ennio Tardini, Parma	3–2	3	14 October 2009	

== Hat-tricks conceded by Italy ==
Results list Italy's goal tally first

Hat-tricks conceded by Italy
Player	Competition	Against	Venue	Result	Goals	Date	Ref(s)
Eugène Maës	Friendly	France	Campo Torino, Turin	3–4	3	17 March 1912	
Josef Sedláček	Friendly	Czechoslovakia	Stadion Letná, Prague	1–5	3	27 May 1923	
György Molnár	Friendly	Hungary	Hidegkuti Nándor Stadion, Budapest	1–7	3	6 April 1924	
Valdemar Mota	Friendly	Portugal	Campo do Ameal, Porto	1–4	3	15 April 1928	
Karl Zischek	1933–35 Central European International Cup	Austria	Stadio Municipale Benito Mussolini, Turin	2–4	3	11 February 1934	
Franz Binder	Friendly	Germany	Olympiastadion, Berlin	2–5	3	26 November 1939	
Lauro Amadò	Friendly	Switzerland	Hardturm, Zürich	4–4	3	11 November 1945	
John Hansen	1948 Summer Olympics	Denmark	Highbury, London	3–5	4	5 August 1948	
Safet Sušić	Friendly	Yugoslavia	Stadion Maksimir, Zagreb	1–4	3	13 June 1979	
