= List of Allsvenskan hat-tricks =

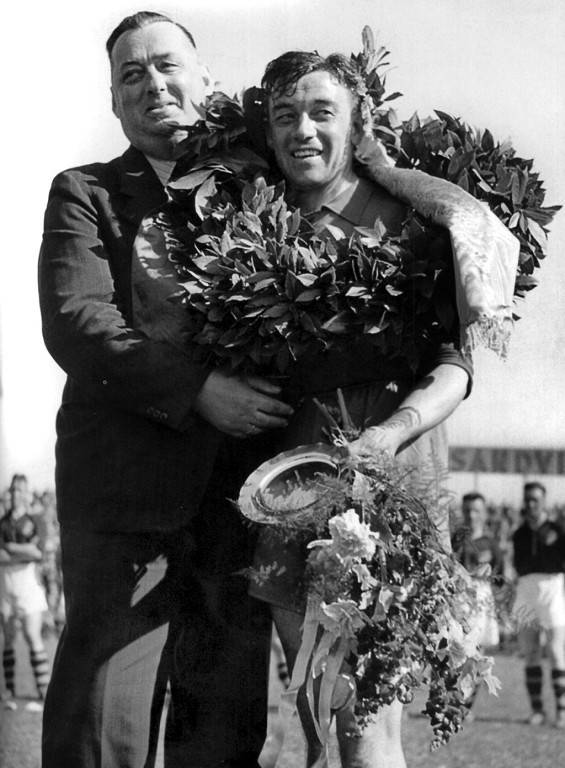
Knut Kroon of Hälsingborg shares the record of fastest hat-trick in Allsvenskan with three minutes.

This is a list of hat-tricks in Allsvenskan since its inception in 1924–25. Hälsingborg's Knut Kroon and Halmstad's Tobie Svensson have scored the fastest hat-tricks in the Swedish league's history. Each player scored all three of their goals within a span of 3 minutes: Kroon against IFK Eskilstuna on 21 October 1928 and Svensson against Gefle IF on 28 October 1934.

== Hat-tricks ==
Player	Nationality	For	Against	Result	Date	Ref
Sven Rydell^{5}	Sweden	Örgryte IS	IFK Norrköping	11–0	6 April 1928	
Knut Kroon	Sweden	Hälsingborgs IF	IFK Eskilstuna	13–1	21 October 1928	
Tobie Svensson	Sweden	Halmstads BK	Gefle IF	4–2	28 October 1934	
Arne Hjertsson^{7}	Sweden	Malmö FF	Halmstads BK	12–0	3 June 1943	
Gunnar Nordahl^{7}	Sweden	IFK Norrköping	Landskrona BoIS	9–1	12 November 1944	
Gunnar Nordahl^{4}	Sweden	IFK Norrköping	Djurgårdens IF	11–1	14 October 1945	
John Eriksson^{4}	Sweden	Djurgårdens IF	Halmstads BK	5–1	1 August 1954	
Leif Skiöld	Sweden	Djurgårdens IF	IFK Göteborg	2–8	15 April 1962	
Leif Eriksson	Sweden	Djurgårdens IF	IFK Göteborg	2–8	15 April 1962	
Leif Skiöld	Sweden	Djurgårdens IF	IFK Malmö	6–0	20 August 1962	
Leif Skiöld	Sweden	Djurgårdens IF	Malmö FF	0–4	15 October 1962	
Reine Almqvist^{4}	Sweden	Åtvidabergs FF	GIF Sundsvall	4–1	21 September 1975	
Afonso Alves	Brazil	Örgryte IS	Djurgårdens IF	2–3	9 July 2002	
Afonso Alves	Brazil	Örgryte IS	Djurgårdens IF	4–2	30 September 2002	
Andreas Johansson	Sweden	Djurgårdens IF	Enköpings SK	0–4	11 May 2003	
Miran Burgić	Slovenia	AIK	Åtvidabergs FF	4–1	17 May 2010	
Mathias Ranégie	Sweden	BK Häcken	Syrianska FC	1–5	17 April 2011	
Mathias Ranégie	Sweden	BK Häcken	Trelleborgs FF	1–4	18 June 2011	
Stefan Selaković	Sweden	IFK Göteborg	Syrianska FC	3–0	10 July 2011	
Teteh Bangura^{4}	Sierra Leone	AIK	Halmstads BK	4–0	11 July 2011	
Tobias Hysén	Sweden	IFK Göteborg	Halmstads BK	3–1	25 July 2011	
Kennedy Igboananike	Nigeria	Djurgårdens IF	Trelleborgs FF	4–3	11 September 2011	
Abiola Dauda	Nigeria	Kalmar FF	BK Häcken	3–1	16 April 2012	
Sharbel Touma	Sweden	Syrianska FC	IFK Norrköping	1–4	6 May 2012	
Waris Majeed^{5}	Ghana	BK Häcken	IFK Norrköping	6–0	16 May 2012	
Alfreð Finnbogason	Iceland	Helsingborgs IF	Gefle IF	4–1	2 July 2012	
Erton Fejzullahu	Sweden	Djurgårdens IF	Helsingborgs IF	3–1	25 August 2012	
Nikola Đurđić	Serbia	Helsingborgs IF	GIF Sundsvall	4–0	15 September 2012	
Waris Majeed	Ghana	BK Häcken	Syrianska FC	5–1	6 October 2012	
Gunnar Heiðar Þorvaldsson	Iceland	IFK Norrköping	GIF Sundsvall	0–4	28 October 2012	
Kristian Haynes	Sweden	Mjällby AIF	Syrianska FC	4–1	12 May 2013	
Aleksandar Prijović	Switzerland	Djurgårdens IF	IFK Norrköping	2–3	22 August 2013	
Pablo Piñones Arce^{4}	Sweden	Östers IF	IF Elfsborg	2–4	25 August 2013	
Lasse Vibe	Denmark	IFK Göteborg	Åtvidabergs FF	5–0	17 April 2014	
Emil Forsberg	Sweden	Malmö FF	Åtvidabergs FF	3–0	12 July 2014	
Lasse Vibe	Denmark	IFK Göteborg	Mjällby AIF	3–1	20 July 2014	
Ricardo Santos	Brazil	Åtvidabergs FF	IF Brommapojkarna	3–2	20 July 2014	
Henok Goitom	Sweden	AIK	Gefle IF	3–1	10 August 2014	
Sebastian Andersson	Sweden	Djurgårdens IF	IF Brommapojkarna	0–4	25 August 2014	
Nasiru Mohammed	Ghana	BK Häcken	IF Brommapojkarna	1–5	20 September 2014	
Lasse Vibe	Denmark	IFK Göteborg	Örebro SK	3–4	24 September 2014	
Emil Forsberg	Sweden	Malmö FF	Mjällby AIF	4–1	27 September 2014	
Alhassan Kamara	Sierra Leone	Örebro SK	BK Häcken	5–2	1 November 2014	
Gustav Engvall	Sweden	IFK Göteborg	Halmstads BK	5–1	1 November 2014	
Søren Rieks	Denmark	IFK Göteborg	BK Häcken	4–0	16 August 2015	
Paulinho	Brazil	BK Häcken	Halmstads BK	4–1	14 September 2015	
Martin Broberg	Sweden	Örebro SK	IF Elfsborg	4–2	21 September 2015	
Paulinho	Brazil	BK Häcken	IF Elfsborg	5–2	25 October 2015	
Sebastian Andersson	Sweden	Djurgårdens IF	GIF Sundsvall	4–2	31 October 2015	
Erik Israelsson	Sweden	Hammarby IF	Helsingborgs IF	4–1	10 April 2016	
Viðar Örn Kjartansson	Iceland	Malmö FF	BK Häcken	3–0	1 May 2016	
Viðar Örn Kjartansson	Iceland	Malmö FF	Östersunds FK	1–4	28 May 2016	
Issam Jebali	Tunisia	IF Elfsborg	GIF Sundsvall	4-0	22 August 2016	
Peter Wilson	Liberia	GIF Sundsvall	Jönköpings Södra IF	3-1	1 October 2016	
Rômulo	Brazil	Hammarby IF	Djurgårdens IF	4-2	17 October 2016	
John Owoeri^{4}	Nigeria	BK Häcken	Falkenbergs FF	7-0	6 November 2016	
Gustav Engvall	Sweden	Djurgårdens IF	Örebro SK	0-4	7 May 2017	
Nahir Besara	Sweden	Örebro SK	IFK Göteborg	4-2	16 July 2017	
Filip Rogić	Sweden	Örebro SK	IK Sirius	3-4	25 September 2017	
Nicolás Stefanelli	Argentina	AIK	IF Elfsborg	5-2	1 October 2017	
Ioannis Pittas	Cyprus	AIK	IFK Värnamo	3-1	12 November 2023	
Paulos Abraham	Sweden	Hammarby IF	Mjällby AIF	3-0	4 April 2026	
