= List of Philippines national football team hat-tricks =

The following are players who has scored three or more goals in a match (hat-trick) in an international match against a national side for the Philippine national football team. The latest hat-trick for the national team was made by Bienvenido Marañón in a 2020 AFF Championship match against Singapore on December 18, 2021. Hat-tricks conceded by the Philippines to opposing national teams along with the scorer are also listed here.

== Hat-tricks for the Philippines ==
Key

More than a hat-trick scored *

Table

The result is presented with the Philippines' score first.

Date	Goals	Player	Opponent	Venue	Competition	Result	Ref^{[a]}
November 20, 1977	4	Roberto Benavidez	Brunei	Stadium Merdeka, Kuala Lumpur	1977 Southeast Asian Games	4–1	
November 14, 2006	4	Phil Younghusband	Timor-Leste	Panaad Stadium, Bacolod	2007 AFF Championship qualification	7–0	
October 12, 2010	3	Ian Araneta	Macau	Kaohsiung National Stadium, Kaohsiung	2010 Long Teng Cup	5–0	
October 22, 2010	3	Ian Araneta	Timor-Leste	New Laos National Stadium, Vientiane	2010 AFF Suzuki Cup qualification	5–0	
September 27, 2012	3	Denis Wolf	Macau	Rizal Memorial Stadium, Manila	2012 Philippine Peace Cup	5–0	
March 24, 2013	4	Phil Younghusband	Cambodia	Rizal Memorial Stadium, Manila	2014 AFC Challenge Cup qualification	8–0	
October 12, 2014	4	Mark Hartmann	Papua New Guinea	Rizal Memorial Stadium, Manila	Friendly	5–0	
December 18, 2021	3	Bienvenido Marañón	Myanmar	Bishan Stadium, Singapore	2020 AFF Championship	3–2	
October 9, 2025	4	Bjørn Martin Kristensen	Timor-Leste	Territory Rugby League Stadium, Darwin	2027 AFC Asian Cup qualification	4–1	

== Hat-tricks conceded by the Philippines ==
Key

More than a hat-trick scored *

Table

The result is presented with the Philippines' score first.

Date	Goals	Player	Opponent	Venue	Competition	Result	Ref^{[a]}
May 25, 1930	4	Takeo Wakabayashi	Japan	Meiji Jingu Stadium, Tokyo	1930 Far Eastern Championship Games	2–7	
September 27, 1967	6	Kunishige Kamamoto	Japan	National Olympic Stadium, Tokyo	1968 Summer Olympics qualification	0–15	
September 27, 1967	4	Teruki Miyamoto	Japan	National Olympic Stadium, Tokyo	1968 Summer Olympics qualification	0–15	
August 5, 1971	3	Subhash Bhowmick	India	Merdeka Stadium, Kuala Lumpur	1971 Merdeka Tournament	1–5	
September 27, 1971	3	Kunishige Kamamoto	Japan	Seoul Stadium, Seoul	1972 Summer Olympics qualification	1–8	
September 29, 1971	3	Park Su-deok	South Korea	Seoul Stadium, Seoul	1972 Summer Olympics qualification	0–6	
September 25, 1972	3	Iswadi Idris	Indonesia	Dongdaemun Stadium, Seoul	1972 President's Cup	0–12	
September 3, 1974	3	Kunishige Kamamoto	Japan	Aryamehr Stadium, Tehran	1974 Asian Games	0–4	
September 7, 1974	5	Mokhtar Dahari	Malaysia	Aryamehr Stadium, Tehran	1974 Asian Games	0–11	
June 1, 1983	4	Salim Moin	Singapore	National Stadium, Kallang	1983 Southeast Asian Games	0–5	
September 7, 1983	5	Kazushi Kimura	Japan	National Stadium, Tokyo	1984 Summer Olympics qualification	1–10	
December 2, 1991	4	Ronnachai Sayomchai	Thailand	Rizal Memorial Stadium, Manila	1991 Southeast Games	2–6	
June 9, 1993	4	Fandi Ahmad	Singapore	Singapore	1993 Southeast Games	0–7	
February 1, 1996	3	Hao Haidong	China	Hong Kong	1996 AFC Asian Cup qualification	0–7	
November 4, 1996	3	K. Sanbagamaran	Malaysia	National Stadium, Singapore	1996 Tiger Cup	0–7	
July 30, 1999	4	Kiatisuk Senamuang	Thailand	Berakas Track and Field Complex, Bandar Seri Begawan	1999 Southeast Asian Games	0–9	
August 1, 1999	3	Myo Hlaing Win	Myanmar	Berakas Sports Complex, Bandar Seri Begawan	1999 Southeast Asian Games	1–4	
January 23, 2000	5	Su Maozhen	China	Thống Nhất Stadium, Hanoi	2000 AFC Asian Cup qualification	0–8	
April 30, 2001	5	Said Bayazid	Syria	Al-Hamadaniah Stadium, Aleppo	2002 FIFA World Cup qualification	0–13	
May 7, 2001	4	Yaqoob Juma Al-Mukhaini	Oman	Sultan Qaboos Sports Complex, Muscat	2002 FIFA World Cup qualification	0–7	
December 23, 2002	4	Bambang Pamungkas	Indonesia	Gelora Bung Karno Stadium, Jakarta	2002 Tiger Cup	1–13	
December 23, 2002	4	Zaenal Arif	Indonesia	Gelora Bung Karno Stadium, Jakarta	2002 Tiger Cup	1–13	
January 16, 2019	3	Vitalij Lux	Kyrgyzstan	Rashid Stadium, Dubai	2019 AFC Asian Cup	1–3	
