= List of Japan national football team hat-tricks =

This page is a list of the hat-tricks scored for Japan's national football team. Besides the instances of a player scoring three goals in a game, the list also includes games where a player has scored more than three goals.

== Goalscorer ==
No.	Player	Opponent	Goals (Note: Goals column is sorted by the time elapsed between the first and the third goal.)	Score (Note: Japan's score is shown first.)	Venue	Competition	Date	Ref
1	Takeo Wakabayashi	Philippines	4	7–2	(Japan) Meiji Jingu Stadium, Tokyo	1930 Far Eastern Games	25 May 1930	
2	Hiroshi Ninomiya	Singapore	3 – (57', 62', 80')	4–1	(Malaysia) Stadium Merdeka, Kuala Lumpur	1959 Merdeka Tournament	3 September 1959	
3	Shigeo Yaegashi	South Vietnam	3	5–1	(Malaysia) Stadium Merdeka, Kuala Lumpur	1963 Merdeka Tournament	12 August 1963	
4	Ryuichi Sugiyama	Singapore	3 – (6', 13', 26')	4–1	Jalan Besar Stadium, Singapore	Friendly match	25 March 1965	
5	Teruki Miyamoto	Philippines	'''4''' – (20', 30', 40', 46')	15–0	Japan National Stadium, Tokyo	1968 Summer Olympics qualification	27 September 1967	
6	Kunishige Kamamoto	Philippines	'''6''' – (15', 16', 26', 43', 64', 89')	15–0	Japan National Stadium, Tokyo	1968 Summer Olympics qualification	27 September 1967	
7	Kunishige Kamamoto	Taiwan	'''3''' – (25', 67', 75')	4–0	Japan National Stadium, Tokyo	1968 Summer Olympics qualification	30 September 1967	
8	Kunishige Kamamoto	Nigeria	'''3''' – (24', 72', 89')	3–0	(Mexico) Estadio Cuauhtémoc, Puebla	1968 Summer Olympics	14 October 1968	
9	Tadahiko Ueda	Taiwan	3 – (8', 66', 70')	3–2	(Malaysia) Stadium Merdeka, Kuala Lumpur	1970 Merdeka Tournament	16 August 1970	
10	Kunishige Kamamoto	Philippines	'''3''' – (11', 52', 73')	8–1	(Thailand) Rajamangala Stadium, Bangkok	1972 Summer Olympic qualification	27 September 1971	
11	Kunishige Kamamoto	Taiwan	'''3''' – (13', 71', 81')	5–1	(Thailand) Rajamangala Stadium, Bangkok	1972 Summer Olympic qualification	29 September 1971	
12	Kunishige Kamamoto	Khmer Republic	4 – (50', 65', 72', 75')	4–1	(Malaysia) Merdeka Stadium, Kuala Lumpur	1972 Merdeka Tournament	12 July 1972	
13	Kunishige Kamamoto	Sri Lanka	5 – (5', 8', 58', 65', 89')	5–0	(Malaysia) Perak Stadium, Ipoh	1972 Merdeka Tournament	16 July 1972	
14	Kunishige Kamamoto	Philippines	3 – (1', 15', 44')	4–0	(Iran) Amjadieh Stadium, Tehran	1974 Asian Games	3 September 1974	
15	Yasuhiko Okudera	Indonesia	3 – (15', 30', 73')	6–0	(Malaysia) Stadium Merdeka, Kuala Lumpur	1976 Merdeka Tournament	10 August 1976	
16	Hiromi Hara	Bangladesh	3 – (1', 60', 71')	4–0	(South Korea) Public Stadium, Daejeon	1986 Asian Games	28 September 1986	
17	Kazuyoshi Miura	Bangladesh	4 – (18', 44', 52', 53')	8–0	(Japan) National Stadium, Tokyo	1994 FIFA World Cup qualification	11 April 1993	
18	Takuya Takagi	Macau	3 – (13', 33', 71')	10–0	(Oman) Sultan Qaboos Sports Complex, Muscat	1998 FIFA World Cup qualification	25 March 1997	
19	Hiroaki Morishima	Macau	3 – (78', 81', 89')	10–0	(Oman) Sultan Qaboos Sports Complex, Muscat	1998 FIFA World Cup qualification	25 March 1997	
20	Takuya Takagi	Nepal	3 – (47', 55', 89')	6–0	(Oman) Sultan Qaboos Sports Complex, Muscat	1998 FIFA World Cup qualification	27 March 1997	
21	Kazuyoshi Miura	Macau	6 – (23', 29', 44, 57', 62', 79')	10–0	(Japan) National Stadium, Tokyo	1998 FIFA World Cup qualification	22 June 1997	
22	Kazuyoshi Miura	Uzbekistan	4 – (4' pen., 23', 64', 80')	6–3	(Japan) National Stadium, Tokyo	1998 FIFA World Cup qualification	7 September 1997	
23	Masashi Nakayama	Brunei	3 – (1', 2', 4')	9–0	(Macau) Estádio Campo Desportivo, Taipa	2000 AFC Asian Cup qualification	16 February 2000	
24	Akinori Nishizawa	Uzbekistan	3 – (14', 24', 49')	8–1	(Lebanon) Saida Municipal Stadium, Saida	2000 AFC Asian Cup	17 October 2000	
25	Naohiro Takahara	Uzbekistan	3 – (17', 20', 57')	8–1	(Lebanon) Saida Municipal Stadium, Saida	2000 AFC Asian Cup	17 October 2000	
26	Shinji Okazaki	Hong Kong	3 – (17', 74', 76')	6–0	(Japan) Outsourcing Stadium, Shizuoka	2011 AFC Asian Cup qualification	8 October 2009	
27	Shinji Okazaki	Togo	3 – (5', 8', 65')	5–0	(Japan) Miyagi Stadium, Rifu	Friendly match	14 October 2009	
28	Sōta Hirayama	Yemen	3 – (42', 55', 80')	3–2	(Yemen) Ali Mohsen Al-Muraisi Stadium, Sana'a	2011 AFC Asian Cup qualification	6 January 2010	
29	Shinji Okazaki	Saudi Arabia	3 – (8', 13', 80')	5–0	(Qatar) Ahmed bin Ali Stadium, Al Rayyan	2011 AFC Asian Cup	17 January 2011	
30	Keisuke Honda	Jordan	3 – (22', 31', 53' pen.)	6–0	(Japan) Saitama Stadium 2002, Saitama	2014 FIFA World Cup qualification	8 June 2012	
31	Koki Ogawa	Hong Kong	3 – (26', 45+1', 58')	5–0	(South Korea) Busan Gudeok Stadium, Busan	2019 EAFF E-1 Football Championship	14 December 2019	
32	Yuya Osako	Mongolia	3 – (23', 55', 90+3)	14–0	(Japan) Fukuda Denshi Arena, Chiba	2022 FIFA World Cup qualification	30 March 2021	
33	Yuya Osako	Myanmar	5 – (22', 30' pen. 36', 49', 88')	10–0	(Japan) Fukuda Denshi Arena, Chiba	2022 FIFA World Cup qualification	28 May 2021	
34	Ado Onaiwu	Kyrgyzstan	3 – (27' pen. 31', 33')	5–1	(Japan) Panasonic Stadium Suita, Suita	2022 FIFA World Cup qualification	15 June 2021	
35	Ayase Ueda	Myanmar	3 – (11', 45+4', 50')	5–0	(Japan) Panasonic Stadium Suita, Suita	2026 FIFA World Cup qualification	16 November 2023	
36	Ryo Germain	Hong Kong	4 – (4', 10', 22', 26')	6–1	(South Korea) Yongin Mireu Stadium, Yongin	2025 EAFF E-1 Football Championship	8 July 2025	

== Statistic ==
No	Player	Total goal
1	Kunishige Kamamoto	30 (in 8 matches)
2	Kazuyoshi Miura	14 (in 3 matches)
3	Shinji Okazaki	9 (in 3 matches)
4	Yuya Osako	8 (in 2 matches)
5	Takuya Takagi	6 (in 2 matches)
6	Takeo Wakabayashi; Teruki Miyamoto; Ryo Germain	4 (in 1 matches)
7	Hiroshi Ninomiya; Shigeo Yaegashi; Ryuichi Sugiyama; Tadahiko Ueda; Yasuhiko Okudera; Hiromi Hara; Hiroaki Morishima; Masashi Nakayama; Akinori Nishizawa; Naohiro Takahara; Sōta Hirayama; Keisuke Honda; Ado Onaiwu; Koki Ogawa; Ayase Ueda	3 (in 1 matches)
