= List of ASEAN Championship hat-tricks =

This is a list of all hat-tricks scored during ASEAN Football Federation Championship; that is, the occasions when a footballer has scored three or more goals in a single football ASEAN Championship match. There have been 23 hat-tricks scored in the 16 editions of the ASEAN Championship tournament.

The first hat-trick was scored by K. Sanbagamaran of Malaysia, playing against the Philippines in the 1996 AFF Championship; the most recent was by Win Naing Tun of Myanmar, scoring thrice against Laos at the 2026 ASEAN Championship.

In 2002, Indonesian Bambang Pamungkas became the first player to record two hat-tricks in a single edition, as well as the first player to score four goals in a single match. His teammate Zaenal Arief also scored four goals in that very same match, with Indonesia beating the Philippines 13–1. Vietnamese Phan Thanh Bình, Singaporean Noh Alam Shah and Thai Adisak Kraisorn are the other three players to have scored more than three goals in a match at the tournament.

Noh Alam Shah and Kraisorn are also the only players who have scored a double hat-trick in a single match, with Alam Shah scoring a record seven goals against Laos in 2007. He also became the first player to record a hat-trick in two consecutive tournaments. The fastest hat-trick was scored by Sarayuth Chaikamdee of Thailand, who did so within four minutes against Timor-Leste in 2004.

== List ==
AFF Championship hat-tricks
No.	Tournament	Player	Number and time of goals	For	Goals	Result	Against	Round	Date	Ref.
1	1996, Singapore	K. Sanbagamaran	3 – 36', 61', 89'	Malaysia	1–0, 4–0, 7–0	7–0	Philippines	Group stage	4 September 1996	
2	2000, Thailand	Worrawoot Srimaka	3 – 14', 18', 32'	Thailand	1–0, 2–0, 3–0	4–1	Indonesia	Final	18 November 2000	
3	2002, Indonesia	Bambang Pamungkas	3 – 58', 79', 89'	Indonesia	2–2, 3–2, 4–2	4–2	Cambodia	Group stage	17 December 2002	
4	2002, Singapore	Kiatisuk Senamuang	3 – 8', 83', 90'	Thailand	1–0, 4–1, 5–1	5–1	Laos	Group stage	18 December 2002	
5	2002, Indonesia	Bambang Pamungkas (II)	4 – 1', 29', 35', 82'	Indonesia	1–0, 4–0, 5–0, 12–1	13–1	Philippines	Group stage	23 December 2002	
6	2002, Indonesia	Zaenal Arief	4 – 6', 38', 41', 57'	Indonesia	2–0, 6–0, 7–0, 9–0	13–1	Philippines	Group stage	23 December 2002	
7	2004, Vietnam	Lê Công Vinh	3 – 57', 87', 89'	Vietnam	3–1, 8–1, 9–1	9–1	Cambodia	Group stage	9 December 2004	
8	2004, Malaysia	Sarayuth Chaikamdee	3 – 63', 65', 67'	Thailand	5–0, 6–0, 7–0	8–0	Timor-Leste	Group stage	12 December 2004	
9	2004, Vietnam	Ilham Jaya Kesuma	3 – 5', 48', 56'	Indonesia	1–0, 3–0, 5–0	8–0	Cambodia	Group stage	13 December 2004	
10	2004, Singapore	Noh Alam Shah	3 – 74', 94', 96'	Singapore	1–2, 2–2, 3–2	4–2 aet	Myanmar	Semi-final	2 January 2005	(Note: The Asian Football Confederation claims Singapore's first goal against Myanmar is attributed as the own goal by Myanmar's Zaw Linn Tun.)
11	2007, Singapore	Noh Alam Shah (II)	7 – 11', 24', 61', 72', 76', 88', 90+2'	Singapore	2–0, 3–0, 5–0, 7–0, 8–0, 10–0, 11–0	11–0	Laos	Group stage	15 January 2007	
12	2007, Singapore	Lê Công Vinh (II)	3 – 1', 28', 58'	Vietnam	1–0, 2–0, 5–0	9–0	Laos	Group stage	17 January 2007	
13	2007, Singapore	Phan Thanh Bình	4 – 29', 73' (p), 81', 84'	Vietnam	3–0, 6–0, 7–0, 8–0	9–0	Laos	Group stage	17 January 2007	
14	2008, Indonesia	Budi Sudarsono	3 – 5', 54', 70'	Indonesia	1–0, 2–0, 4–0	4–0	Cambodia	Group stage	7 December 2008	
15	2012, Thailand	Teerasil Dangda	3 – 20', 82', 89'	Thailand	1–0, 3–0, 4–0	4–0	Myanmar	Group stage	27 November 2012	
16	2016, Philippines	Teerasil Dangda (II)	3 – 36', 79', 90+4'	Thailand	2–0, 3–2, 4–2	4–2	Indonesia	Group stage	19 November 2016	
17	2018, Thailand	Adisak Kraisorn	6 – 3', 13', 31', 45', 50', 56' (p)	Thailand	1–0, 2–0, 3–0, 4–0, 5–0, 6–0	7–0	Timor-Leste	Group stage	9 November 2018	
18	2018, Singapore	Safuwan Baharudin	3 – 12', 19', 90+2'	Singapore	1–0, 2–1, 6–1	6–1	Timor-Leste	Group stage	21 November 2018	
19	2020, Singapore	Safawi Rasid	3 – 7', 34', 80'	Malaysia	1–0, 2–0, 4–0	4–0	Laos	Group stage	9 December 2021	
20	2020, Singapore	Bienvenido Marañón	3 – 16', 19', 45'	Philippines	1–0, 2–0, 3–0	3–2	Myanmar	Group stage	18 December 2021	
21	2026, Thailand	Nguyễn Đình Bắc	3 – 31', 42', 65'	Vietnam	2–0, 4–0, 6–0	7–0	Timor-Leste	Group stage	24 July 2026	
22	2026, Indonesia	Mitchell Baker	3 – 6', 15', 56'	Indonesia	1–0, 2–0, 4–1	5–1	Cambodia	Group stage	27 July 2026	
23	2026, Myanmar	Win Naing Tun	3 – 20', 41', 83'	Myanmar	2–1, 3–2, 7–2	7–2	Laos	Group stage	4 August 2026	
