= List of CONCACAF Gold Cup hat-tricks =

The CONCACAF Gold Cup is the main association football competition of the men's national football teams governed by CONCACAF, determining the continental champion of North America, Central America, and the Caribbean. A hat-trick occurs when a player scores three or more goals in a single match and it is considered an achievement in association football, especially at the international level. Since the start of the competition, 21 hat-tricks have been scored across 18 editions.

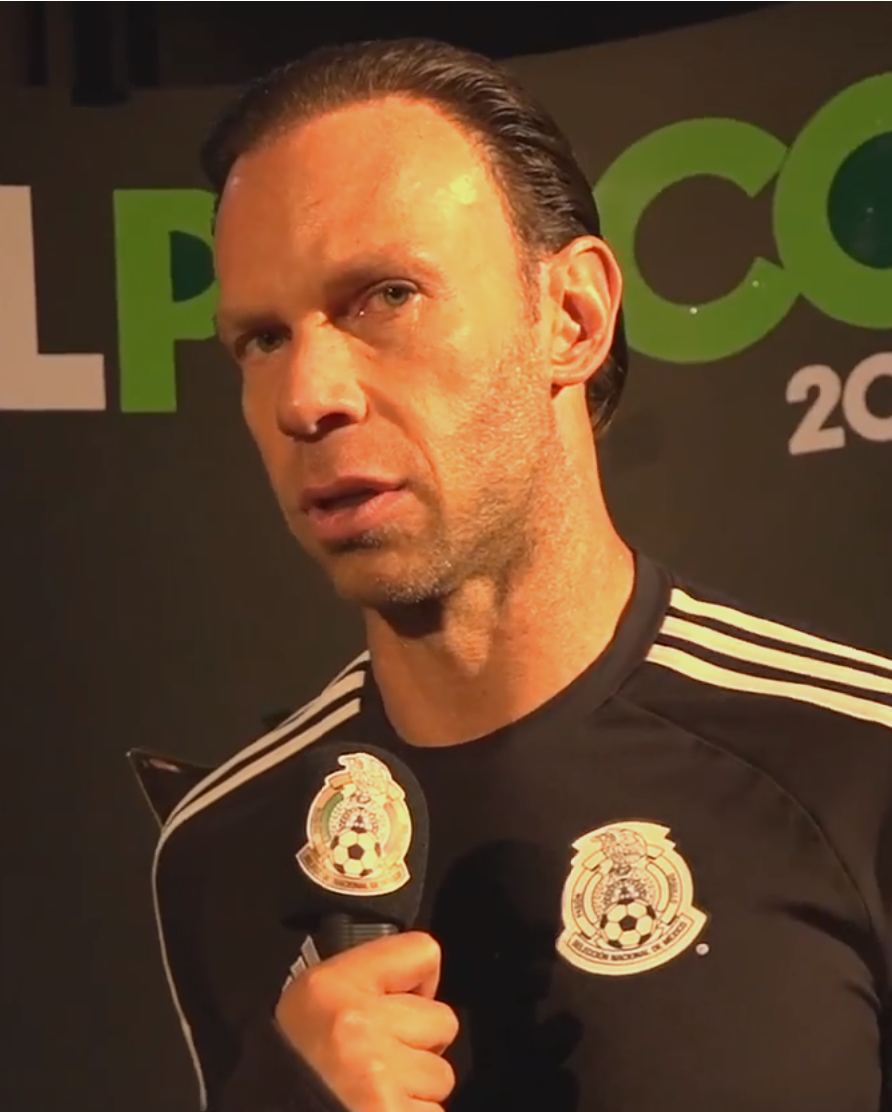
Luís Roberto Alves of Mexico is the only player to score a hat-trick of seven goals at the CONCACAF Gold Cup, doing so in 1993.

== Hat-tricks ==
CONCACAF Gold Cup hat-tricks
| Sequence | Player | Number and Time of goals | For | Result | Against | Tournament | Round | Date | Ref. |
|---|---|---|---|---|---|---|---|---|---|
| 1. | Eduardo Bennett | 3 – 51', 69' (pen.), 83' | Honduras | 5–1 | Panama | 1993 | Group stage | 10 July 1993 | |
| 2. | Luís Roberto Alves | 7 – 11', 21', 29', 54', 76', 84', 90' | Mexico | 9–0 | Martinique | 1993 | Group stage | 11 July 1993 | |
| 3. | Luis Miguel Salvador | 3 – 9', 18', 34' | Mexico | 6–1 | Jamaica | 1993 | Semi-finals | 22 July 1993 | |
| 4. | Paulo Wanchope | 4 – 21', 32', 64', 78' | Costa Rica | 7–2 | Cuba | 1998 | Group stage | 4 February 1998 | |
| 5. | Landon Donovan | 4 – 22', 25', 55', 76' | United States | 5–0 | Cuba | 2003 | Quarter-finals | 19 July 2003 | |
| 6. | Walter Centeno | 3 – 45+2', 68 (pen.), 90+3' (pen.) | Costa Rica | 5–2 | El Salvador | 2003 | Quarter-finals | 19 July 2003 | |
| 7. | Carlos Ruiz | 3 – 11' (pen.), 45', 87' | Guatemala | 3–4 | Jamaica | 2005 | Group stage | 7 July 2005 | |
| 8. | Carlos Pavón | 4 – 3', 12', 42', 53' | Honduras | 5–0 | Cuba | 2007 | Group stage | 13 June 2007 | |
| 9. | Javier Hernández | 3 – 60', 67', 90+5' (pen.) | Mexico | 5–0 | El Salvador | 2011 | Group stage | 5 June 2011 | |
| 10. | Carlo Costly | 3 – 28', 67', 71' | Honduras | 7–1 | Grenada | 2011 | Group stage | 10 June 2011 | |
| 11. | Chris Wondolowski | 3 – 12', 37', 41' | United States | 6–1 | Belize | 2013 | Group stage | 9 July 2013 | |
| 12. | Ariel Martínez | 3 – 38', 61', 84' | Cuba | 4–0 | Belize | 2013 | Group stage | 16 July 2013 | |
| 13. | Oribe Peralta | 3 – 16', 36', 61' | Mexico | 6–0 | Cuba | 2015 | Group stage | 9 July 2015 | |
| 14. | Clint Dempsey | 3 – 4', 64' (pen.), 78' | United States | 6–0 | Cuba | 2015 | Quarter-finals | 18 July 2015 | |
| 15. | Uriel Antuna | 3 – 2', 44', 80' | Mexico | 7–0 | Cuba | 2019 | Group stage | 18 June 2019 | |
| 16. | Lucas Cavallini | 3 – 21', 43', 45+1' | Canada | 7–0 | Cuba | 2019 | Group stage | 23 June 2019 | |
| 17. | Jonathan David | 3 – 3', 71', 77' | Canada | 7–0 | Cuba | 2019 | Group stage | 23 June 2019 | |
| 18. | Jesús Ferreira | 3 – 16', 25', 50' | United States | 6–0 | Saint Kitts and Nevis | 2023 | Group stage | 28 June 2023 | |
| 19. | Jesús Ferreira (2) | 3 – 14', 38', 45+3' (pen.) | United States | 6–0 | Trinidad and Tobago | 2023 | Group stage | 2 July 2023 | |
| 20. | Ismael Díaz | 3 – 56', 63', 65' | Panama | 4–0 | Qatar | 2023 | Quarter-finals | 8 July 2023 | |
| 21. | Ismael Díaz (2) | 3 – 4', 17', 45' (pen.) | Panama | 4–1 | Jamaica | 2025 | Group stage | 24 June 2025 | |

== Hat-tricks by country ==
| Country | Hat-tricks for | Hat-tricks against |
|---|---|---|
| Mexico | 5 | 0 |
| United States | 5 | 0 |
| Honduras | 3 | 0 |
| Canada | 2 | 0 |
| Costa Rica | 2 | 0 |
| Panama | 2 | 1 |
| Guatemala | 1 | 0 |
| Cuba | 1 | 8 |
| Grenada | 0 | 1 |
| Martinique | 0 | 1 |
| Qatar | 0 | 1 |
| Saint Kitts and Nevis | 0 | 1 |
| Trinidad and Tobago | 0 | 1 |
| Belize | 0 | 2 |
| El Salvador | 0 | 2 |
| Jamaica | 0 | 3 |
