= List of Canada men's national soccer team hat-tricks =

This article is a list of the hat-tricks scored by or conceded by the Canada men's national soccer team. Besides the instances of a player scoring three goals in a game, the list also includes games where a player has scored more than three goals.

The only Canadian players with multiple hat-tricks in international play are Jonathan David with three, and Lucas Cavallini with two.

== Hat-tricks scored by Canada ==
Result lists Canada first.

No.	Date	Player	Opponent	Goals	Result	Venue	Competition	Ref.
1	April 5, 1988	John Catliff	Jamaica	3 (33', 42', 52')	4–0	National Stadium, Kingston	Friendly	
2	November 15, 1992	Alex Bunbury	Bermuda	3 (9', 14', 35')	4–2	Swangard Stadium, Burnaby	1994 FIFA World Cup qualification	
3	October 7, 2011	Simeon Jackson	Saint Lucia	3 (18', 28', 40')	7–0	Beausejour Stadium, Gros Islet	2014 FIFA World Cup qualification	
4	June 23, 2019	Lucas Cavallini	Cuba	3 (21', 43', 45+1')	7–0	Bank of America Stadium, Charlotte	2019 CONCACAF Gold Cup	
5	June 23, 2019	Jonathan David	Cuba	3 (3', 71', 77')	7–0	Bank of America Stadium, Charlotte	2019 CONCACAF Gold Cup	
6	September 7, 2019	Junior Hoilett	Cuba	3 (13', 50', 82')	6–0	BMO Field, Toronto	2019–20 CONCACAF Nations League	
7	March 25, 2021	Cyle Larin	Bermuda	3 (19', 27', 69')	5–1	Exploria Stadium, Orlando	2022 FIFA World Cup qualification	
8	March 29, 2021	Lucas Cavallini (2)	Cayman Islands	3 (68', 74', 76')	11–0	IMG Academy, Bradenton	2022 FIFA World Cup qualification	
9	June 8, 2021	Jonathan David (2)	Suriname	3 (59', 73', 77')	4–0	SeatGeek Stadium, Bridgeview	2022 FIFA World Cup qualification	
10	June 18, 2026	Jonathan David (3)	Qatar	3 (29', 45+3', 90+2')	6–0	BC Place, Vancouver	2026 FIFA World Cup	

== Hat-tricks conceded by Canada ==
Result lists Canada first.

No.	Date	Player	Opponent	Goals	Result	Venue	Competition	Ref.
1	November 8, 1925	Archie Stark	United States	5 (?', ?', ?', ?', ?')	1–6	Ebbets Field, New York City	Friendly	
2	November 10, 1973	Emmanuel Sanon	Haiti	3 (?', ?', 66')	1–5	Stade Sylvio Cator, Port-au-Prince	Friendly	
3	October 16, 2012	Jerry Bengtson	Honduras	3 (7', 17', 83')	1–8	Estadio Olímpico Metropolitano, San Pedro Sula	2014 FIFA World Cup qualification	
4	October 16, 2012	Carlo Costly	Honduras	3 (29', 49', 88')	1–8	Estadio Olímpico Metropolitano, San Pedro Sula	2014 FIFA World Cup qualification	
