= List of Egyptian Premier League hat-tricks =

This is the list of Egyptian Premier League hat-tricks.

== List ==
Player	For	Against	Result	Date	Ref.
Mohannad El-Boushi	Tersana	Ismaily	3–3	27 September 2000	
Ashraf Mamdouh	Goldi Maaden	Ismaily	4–1	19 October 2000	
Sayed Abdel Hafiz	Al-Ahli	Tersana	6-0	22 October 2000	
Yasser Mohamed	Al Masry	El Koroum	3–1	27 October 2000	
Mohamed Mahmoud	Mansoura	Dina Farms	5–1	3 January 2001	
Emad Ayoub	Sohag Railway	Al-Ahli	3–4	28 April 2001	
(Ivory Coast) Oussou Konan	Misr El Makasa	Al Ittihad Al Sakandary	5–2	3 November 2011	
(Egypt) Mahmoud Fathalla	El Entag El Harby	Haras El Hodoud	3–0	19 January 2016	
(Egypt) Gedo	El Entag El Harby	Ismaily	3–0	11 February 2016	
(Egypt) Ahmed Raouf	Al Masry	ENPPI	4–0	1 March 2016	
(Egypt) Abdallah Said	Al Ahly	Al Nasr Lel Taa'den	4–0	8 May 2017	
(Ghana) John Antwi	Misr Lel Makkasa	Al Nasr Lel Taa'den	4–1	29 June 2017	
(Egypt) Hussein El Shahat	Misr Lel Makkasa	Tanta	3–3 (A)	26 October 2017	
(Egypt) Hussein El Shahat	Misr Lel Makkasa	Wadi Degla	3–3 (A)	15 November 2017	
(Egypt) Mohamed Hassan	Al Nasr	Misr Lel Makkasa	4–1 (A)	14 December 2017	
(Egypt) Mostafa Mohamed	Tanta	Al Masry	3–6 (A)	28 December 2017	
(Egypt) Mahmoud Alaa	Zamalek	Tala'ea El Gaish	3–0 (H)	13 September 2018	
(Egypt) Ahmed Kabouria	Tala'ea El Gaish	El Gouna	5–0 (H)	7 November 2018	
(Ghana) John Antwi	Misr Lel Makkasa	ENPPI	4–3 (H)	25 November 2018	
(Burkina Faso) Eric Traoré	Pyramids	Al Ittihad	3–2 (A)	11 April 2019	
(Egypt) Walid Soliman	Al Ahly	El Gouna	4–0 (A)	25 November 2019	
(Egypt) Mohamed Grendo	Haras El Hodoud	Tala'ea El Gaish	3–0 (A)	8 January 2020	
(Egypt) Abdallah El Said	Pyramids	Tanta	3–0 (H)	10 August 2020	
(Egypt) Mohamed Abdel Maguid	Aswan	Smouha	3–3 (H)	5 September 2020	
(Tunisia) Rafik Kabou	Wadi Degla	El Entag El Harby	4–1 (A)	28 September 2020	
(Egypt) Mohamed Sherif	Al Ahly	Misr El Maqasa	4–1 (A)	11 July 2021	
(Egypt) Osama Faisal	National Bank of Egypt	Al Masry	4–0 (A)	5 November 2023	
(Egypt) Hossam Ghanem	El Gouna	National Bank of Egypt	3–2 (A)	14 December 2023	
(Egypt) Mahmoud Kaoud	National Bank of Egypt	Al Mokawloon Al Arab	3–1 (H)	30 December 2023	
(Palestine) Wessam Abou Ali	Al Ahly SC	Al Mokawloon Al Arab	4–0 (H)	4 August 2024	

Note

(H) – Home; (A) – Away
