= List of Brazil national football team hat-tricks =

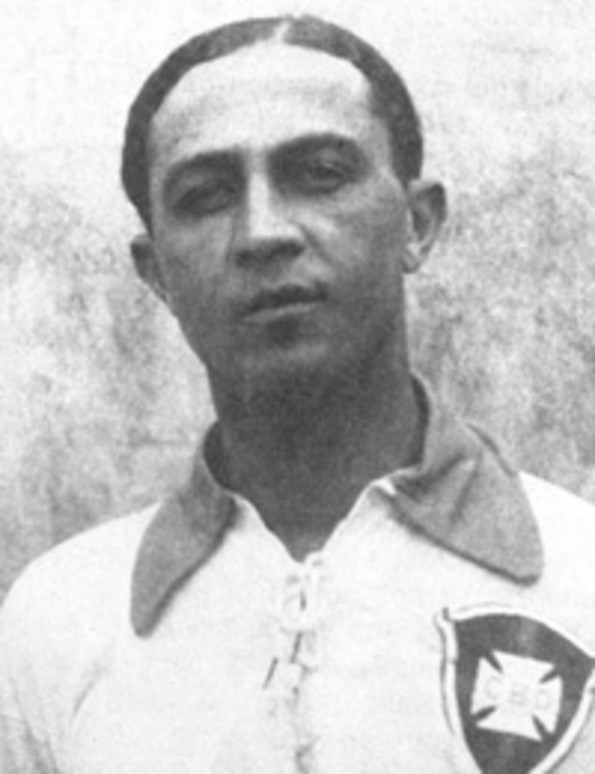
Arthur Friedenreich, scorer of the first hat-trick for Brazil

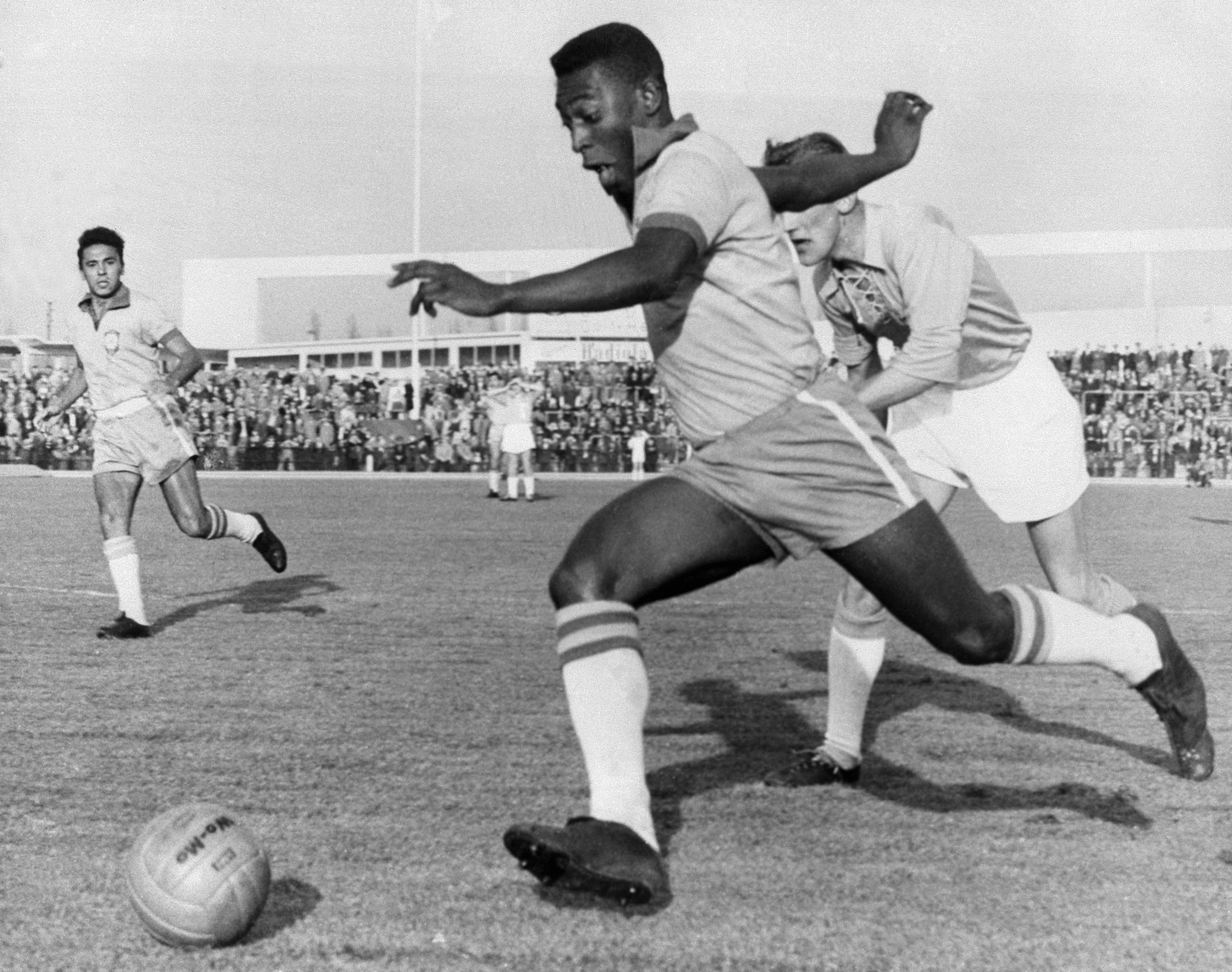
Pelé scored a record seven hat-tricks for Brazil

Since the Brazil national team's first international association football match in 1914, Brazilian players have scored three or more goals (a hat-trick) on 53 occasions. The first hat-trick was scored by Arthur Friedenreich against Chile in 1919. The record for the most goals scored in a single international match by a Brazilian player is five, achieved only by Evaristo against Colombia in 1957.

Pelé holds the record for the most hat-tricks by a Brazilian player, scoring seven between 1958 and 1964, one of which occurred in the World Cup finals. Besides Pelé, the only Brazilian players to have scored a hat-trick in a World Cup final tournament are Leônidas against Poland in 1938 and Ademir against Sweden in 1950. The most recent Brazilian player to score a hat-trick was Vinícius Júnior, who netted three times against Singapore in a friendly on 17 November 2026.

Brazil has conceded at least eleven hat-tricks in its history, five of which came in matches against Argentina. One of the most notable hat-tricks Brazil conceded was achieved by Paolo Rossi of Italy during the 1982 World Cup, eliminating Brazil from the tournament.

== Hat-tricks for Brazil ==
Player	Date	Goals	Opponent	Venue	Competition	Result^{[a]}	Ref.
Arthur Friedenreich	11 May 1919	3	Chile	Estádio das Laranjeiras, Rio de Janeiro	1919 South American Championship	6–0	
Leônidas	5 June 1938	3	Poland	Stade de la Meinau, Strasbourg	1938 FIFA World Cup	6–5	
Sylvio Pirillo	14 January 1942	3	Chile	Estadio Centenario, Montevideo	1942 South American Championship	6–1	
Sylvio Pirillo	31 January 1942	3	Ecuador	Estadio Centenario, Montevideo	1942 South American Championship	5–1	
Jair	18 May 1944	3	Uruguay	Pacaembu Stadium, São Paulo	Friendly	4–0	
Ademir	21 February 1945	3	Ecuador	Estadio Nacional, Santiago	1945 South American Championship	9–2	
Zizinho	3 February 1946	4	Chile	El Gasómetro, Buenos Aires	1946 South American Championship	5–1	
Nininho	10 April 1949	3	Bolivia	Pacaembu Stadium, São Paulo	1949 South American Championship	10–1	
Ademir	11 August 1949	3	Paraguay	São Januário, Rio de Janeiro	1949 South American Championship	7–0	
Ademir	9 July 1950	4	Sweden	Maracanã, Rio de Janeiro	1950 FIFA World Cup	7–1	
Julinho	1 March 1953	4	Bolivia	Estadio Nacional, Lima	1953 South American Championship	8–1	
Chinesinho	13 March 1956	3	Costa Rica	Municipal, Mexico City	1956 Panamerican Championship	7–1	
Larry	13 March 1956	3	Costa Rica	Municipal, Mexico City	1956 Panamerican Championship	7–1	
Didi	13 March 1957	3	Chile	Estadio Nacional, Lima	1957 South American Championship	4–2	
Evaristo	21 March 1957	3	Ecuador	Estadio Nacional, Lima	1957 South American Championship	7–1	
Evaristo	24 March 1957	5	Colombia	Estadio Nacional, Lima	1957 South American Championship	9–0	
Pelé	24 June 1958	3	France	Råsunda, Solna	1958 FIFA World Cup	5–2	
Paulo Valentim	26 March 1959	3	Uruguay	Monumental de Núñez, Buenos Aires	1959 South American Championship (Argentina)	3–1	
Pelé	29 March 1959	3	Paraguay	Monumental de Núñez, Buenos Aires	1959 South American Championship (Argentina)	4–1	
Pelé	17 September 1959	3	Chile	Maracanã, Rio de Janeiro	Copa Bernardo O'Higgins	7–0	
Pelé	1 May 1960	3	United Arab Republic	Alexandria Stadium, Alexandria	Friendly	3–1	
Pelé	16 April 1963	3	Argentina	Maracanã, Rio de Janeiro	Copa Roca	5–2	
Pelé	28 April 1963	3	France	Olympique de Colombes, Paris	Friendly	3–2	
Pelé	6 February 1964	3	Belgium	Maracanã, Rio de Janeiro	Friendly	5–0	
Tostão	10 August 1969	3	Venezuela	Olímpico de la UCV, Caracas	1970 FIFA World Cup qualification	5–0	
Tostão	24 August 1969	3	Venezuela	Maracanã, Rio de Janeiro	1970 FIFA World Cup qualification	6–0	
Zico	14 July 1977	4	Bolivia	Pascual Guerrero, Cali	1978 FIFA World Cup qualification	8–0	
Zico	17 May 1979	3	Paraguay	Maracanã, Rio de Janeiro	Friendly	6–0	
Zico	22 March 1981	3	Bolivia	Maracanã, Rio de Janeiro	1982 FIFA World Cup qualification	3–1	
Zico	30 April 1986	3	Yugoslavia	Estádio do Arruda, Recife	Friendly	4–2	
Careca	28 August 1989	4	Venezuela	Morumbi, São Paulo	1990 FIFA World Cup qualification	6–0	
Raí	23 September 1992	3	Costa Rica	Waldomiro Wagner, Paranavaí	Friendly	4–2	
Romário	8 June 1994	3	Honduras	Jack Murphy Field, San Diego	Friendly	8–2	
Ronaldo	16 October 1996	3	Lithuania	Estádio Governador Alberto Tavares Silva, Teresina	Friendly	3–1	
Ronaldo	21 December 1997	3	Australia	King Fahd International Stadium, Riyadh	1997 FIFA Confederations Cup	6–0	
Romário	21 December 1997	3	Australia	King Fahd International Stadium, Riyadh	1997 FIFA Confederations Cup	6–0	
Giovane Élber	14 October 1998	3	Ecuador	RFK Stadium, Washington, D.C.	Friendly	5–1	
Ronaldinho	1 August 1999	3	Saudi Arabia	Estadio Jalisco, Guadalajara	1999 FIFA Confederations Cup	8–2	
Rivaldo	7 September 1999	3	Argentina	Beira-Rio, Porto Alegre	Friendly	5–1	
Romário	3 September 2000	3	Bolivia	Maracanã, Rio de Janeiro	2002 FIFA World Cup qualification	5–0	
Romário	8 October 2000	4	Venezuela	Pachencho Romero, Maracaibo	2002 FIFA World Cup qualification	5–0	
Ronaldo	3 June 2004	3	Argentina	Mineirão, Belo Horizonte	2006 FIFA World Cup qualification	3–1	
Adriano	11 July 2004	3	Costa Rica	Monumental de la UNSA, Arequipa	2004 Copa América	4–1	
Ronaldinho	18 August 2004	3	Haiti	Stade Sylvio Cator, Port-au-Prince	Friendly	6–0	
Adriano	4 September 2005	3	Chile	Estádio Mané Garrincha, Brasília	2006 FIFA World Cup qualification	5–0	
Robinho	1 July 2007	3	Chile	Estadio Monumental de Maturín, Maturín	2007 Copa América	3–0	
Luís Fabiano	19 November 2008	3	Portugal	Bezerrão, Brasília	Friendly	6–2	
Neymar	10 September 2012	3	China	Estádio do Arruda, Recife	Friendly	8–0	
Neymar	5 March 2014	3	South Africa	Soccer City, Johannesburg	Friendly	5–0	
Neymar	14 October 2014	4	Japan	Sports Hub, Kallang	Friendly	4–0	
Philippe Coutinho	8 June 2016	3	Haiti	Citrus Bowl, Orlando	Copa América Centenario	7–1	
Paulinho	23 March 2017	3	Uruguay	Estadio Centenario, Montevideo	2018 FIFA World Cup qualification	4–1	
Neymar	13 October 2020	3	Peru	Estadio Nacional, Lima	2022 FIFA World Cup qualification	4–2	
Vinícius Júnior	17 November 2026	3	Singapore	National Stadium, Kallang	Friendly	7–0	

== Most hat-tricks for Brazil ==
Player	Hat-tricks	First hat-trick	Last hat-trick
Pelé	7	24 June 1958	6 February 1964
Zico	4	14 July 1977	30 April 1986
Romário	4	8 June 1994	8 October 2000
Neymar	4	10 September 2012	13 October 2020
Ademir	3	26 February 1945	9 July 1950
Ronaldo	3	16 October 1996	3 June 2004
Sylvio Pirillo	2	14 January 1942	31 January 1942
Evaristo	2	21 March 1957	24 March 1957
Tostão	2	10 August 1969	24 August 1969
Ronaldinho	2	1 August 1999	18 August 2004
Adriano	2	11 July 2004	4 September 2005

== Hat-tricks conceded by Brazil ==
Player	Date	Goals	Team	Venue	Competition	Result^{[a]}	Ref.
Manuel Seoane	13 December 1925	3	Argentina	Estadio Sportivo Barracas, Buenos Aires	1925 South American Championship	1–4	
Blagoje Marjanović	16 March 1934	3	Yugoslavia	Stadion SK Jugoslavija, Belgrade	Friendly	4–8	
Ernst Wilimowski	5 June 1938	4	Poland	Stade de la Meinau, Strasbourg	1938 FIFA World Cup	6–5	
Carlos Peucelle	5 March 1940	3	Argentina	El Gasómetro, Buenos Aires	Copa Roca	1–6	
Norberto Méndez	15 February 1945	3	Argentina	Estadio Nacional, Santiago	1945 South American Championship	1–3	
Oscar Míguez	6 May 1950	3	Uruguay	Pacaembu, São Paulo	Copa Río Branco	3–4	
José Sanfilippo	22 December 1959	3	Argentina	Estadio Modelo, Guayaquil	1959 South American Championship (Ecuador)	1–4	
Jacky Stockman	24 April 1963	3	Belgium	Heysel Stadium, Brussels	Friendly	2–4	
Jozef Adamec	23 June 1968	3	Czechoslovakia	Tehelné pole, Bratislava	Friendly	2–3	
Paolo Rossi	5 July 1982	3	Italy	Sarrià Stadium, Barcelona	1982 FIFA World Cup	2–3	
Lionel Messi	9 June 2012	3	Argentina	MetLife Stadium, East Rutherford	Friendly	3–4	
