= List of AFC Asian Cup hat-tricks =

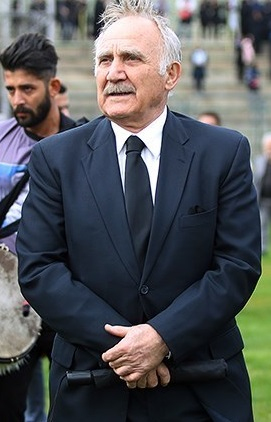
Hossein Kalani scored the first hat-trick in the tournament's history, in the 1972 edition.

This is a list of hat-tricks in the AFC Asian Cup, that being when a player scores three or more goals in a tournament match of the AFC Asian Cup (not including qualification matches). Hat-tricks have occurred nineteen times across the eighteen editions.

The first tournament was held in 1956, however no hat-tricks were scored in the first four competitions. The first instance was in 1972, where Hossein Kalani scored three goals for Iran against Iraq in the group stage. Later on in the same tournament again for Iran, Ali Jabbari scored three goals inside nine minutes to defeat Thailand 3–2. The first time a player would score four goals in a match would be 1980, where Behtash Fariba achieved the feat in a 7–0 win for Iran over Bangladesh. After 1980, three tournaments went by without a hat-trick before Ali Daei scored four goals for Iran in a 6–2 win over South Korea in 1996, also marking the first time at least three goals were scored in a match in the knockout stage. Two tournaments later in 2004, another knockout stage hat-trick was achieved by Ali Karimi for Iran in a 4–3 win against South Korea, again in the quarter-finals. In the 2023 tournament, Akram Afif became the first player to register a hat-trick in the final of the competition, scoring all three of Qatar's goals in their 3–1 victory against Jordan; he was also the first player whose hat-trick consisted solely of penalty kicks.

Iran have scored the most hat-tricks with six, while Bangladesh and Uzbekistan have conceded the most, with three each. No player has ever scored multiple hat-tricks in the Asian Cup, and every hat-trick scorer has had their side go on to win their match.

== Hat-tricks ==
Key
| ^{4} | Player scored four goals in the match |

| No. | Tournament | Player | Time of goals | Representing | Result | Opponent | Round | Date | Ref. |
|---|---|---|---|---|---|---|---|---|---|
| 1 | (Thailand) 1972 | Hossein Kalani | 34', 70', 78' | Iran | 3–0 | Iraq | Group stage | 9 May 1972 | |
| 2 | (Thailand) 1972 | Ali Jabbari | 80', 86', 88' | Iran | 3–2 | Thailand | Group stage | 13 May 1972 | |
| 3 | (Iran) 1976 | Gholam Hossein Mazloumi | 63', 74', 80' | Iran | 8–0 | South Yemen | Group stage | 8 June 1976 | |
| 4 | (Kuwait) 1980 | Behtash Fariba^{4} | 11', 34', 80', 82' | Iran | 7–0 | Bangladesh | Group stage | 22 September 1980 | |
| 5 | (Kuwait) 1980 | Choi Soon-ho | 26', 53', 78' (pen.) | South Korea | 4–1 | United Arab Emirates | Group stage | 24 September 1980 | |
| 6 | (Kuwait) 1980 | Shen Xiangfu | 1', 5', 72' | China | 6–0 | Bangladesh | Group stage | 25 September 1980 | |
| 7 | (Kuwait) 1980 | Xu Yonglai | 16', 79', 89' | China | 6–0 | Bangladesh | Group stage | 25 September 1980 | |
| 8 | (United Arab Emirates) 1996 | Ali Daei^{4} | 66', 76', 83', 89' (pen.) | Iran | 6–2 | South Korea | Quarter-finals | 16 December 1996 | |
| 9 | (Lebanon) 2000 | Akinori Nishizawa | 14', 25', 49' | Japan | 8–1 | Uzbekistan | Group stage | 17 October 2000 | |
| 10 | (Lebanon) 2000 | Naohiro Takahara | 18', 20', 57' | Japan | 8–1 | Uzbekistan | Group stage | 17 October 2000 | |
| 11 | (Lebanon) 2000 | Lee Dong-gook | 30', 76', 90+1' | South Korea | 3–0 | Indonesia | Group stage | 19 October 2000 | |
| 12 | (Lebanon) 2000 | Mohammad Al-Shalhoub | 35', 78', 86' | Saudi Arabia | 5–0 | Uzbekistan | Group stage | 20 October 2000 | |
| 13 | (China) 2004 | Ali Karimi | 10', 20', 77' | Iran | 4–3 | South Korea | Quarter-finals | 31 July 2004 | |
| 14 | (Qatar) 2011 | Ismail Abdullatif^{4} | 16', 19', 35', 77' | Bahrain | 5–2 | India | Group stage | 14 January 2011 | |
| 15 | (Qatar) 2011 | Shinji Okazaki | 8', 13', 80' | Japan | 5–0 | Saudi Arabia | Group stage | 17 January 2011 | |
| 16 | (Australia) 2015 | Hamza Al-Dardour^{4} | 35', 45+2', 75', 80' | Jordan | 5–1 | Palestine | Group stage | 16 January 2015 | |
| 17 | (United Arab Emirates) 2019 | Almoez Ali^{4} | 9', 11', 55', 60' | Qatar | 6–0 | North Korea | Group stage | 13 January 2019 | |
| 18 | (United Arab Emirates) 2019 | Vitalij Lux | 24', 51', 77' | Kyrgyzstan | 3–1 | Philippines | Group stage | 16 January 2019 | |
| 19 | (Qatar) 2023 | Akram Afif | 22' (pen.), 73' (pen.), 90+5' (pen.) | Qatar | 3–1 | Jordan | Final | 10 February 2024 | |

=== By nation ===
| Nation | Hat-tricks |
|---|---|
| Iran | 6 |
| Japan | 3 |
| South Korea | 2 |
| China | 2 |
| Qatar | 2 |
| Jordan | 1 |
| Saudi Arabia | 1 |
| Bahrain | 1 |
| Kyrgyzstan | 1 |
