= List of Hong Kong Premier League hat-tricks =

Since the inception of the Hong Kong Premier League in 2014, 43 players have scored three goals (a hat-trick) or more in a single match. The first player to achieve the feat was Itaparica, who scored three goals for South China in a 4–1 victory over Rangers.

== Hat-tricks ==
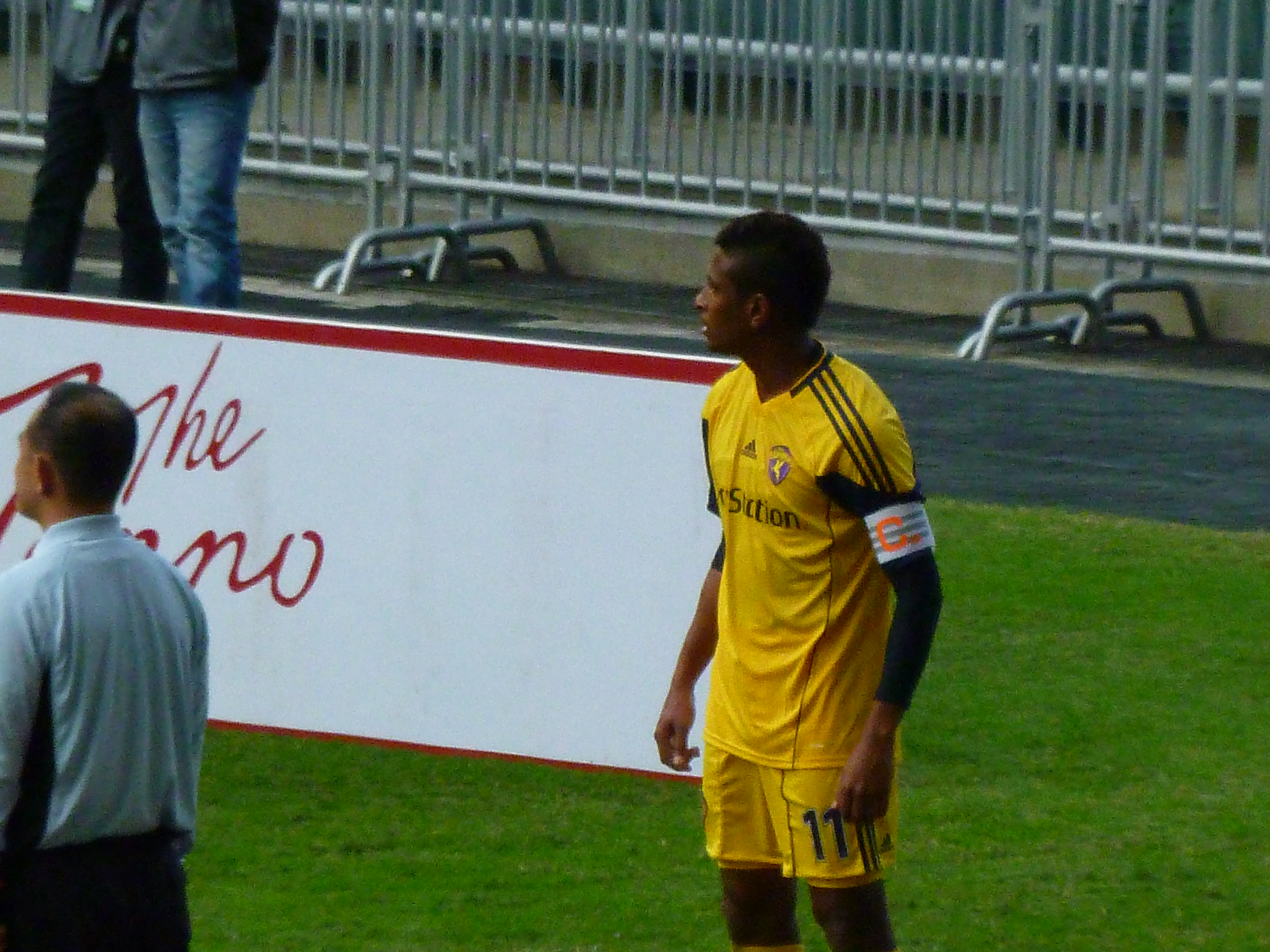
Itaparica scored the first hat-trick in the Hong Kong Premier League.

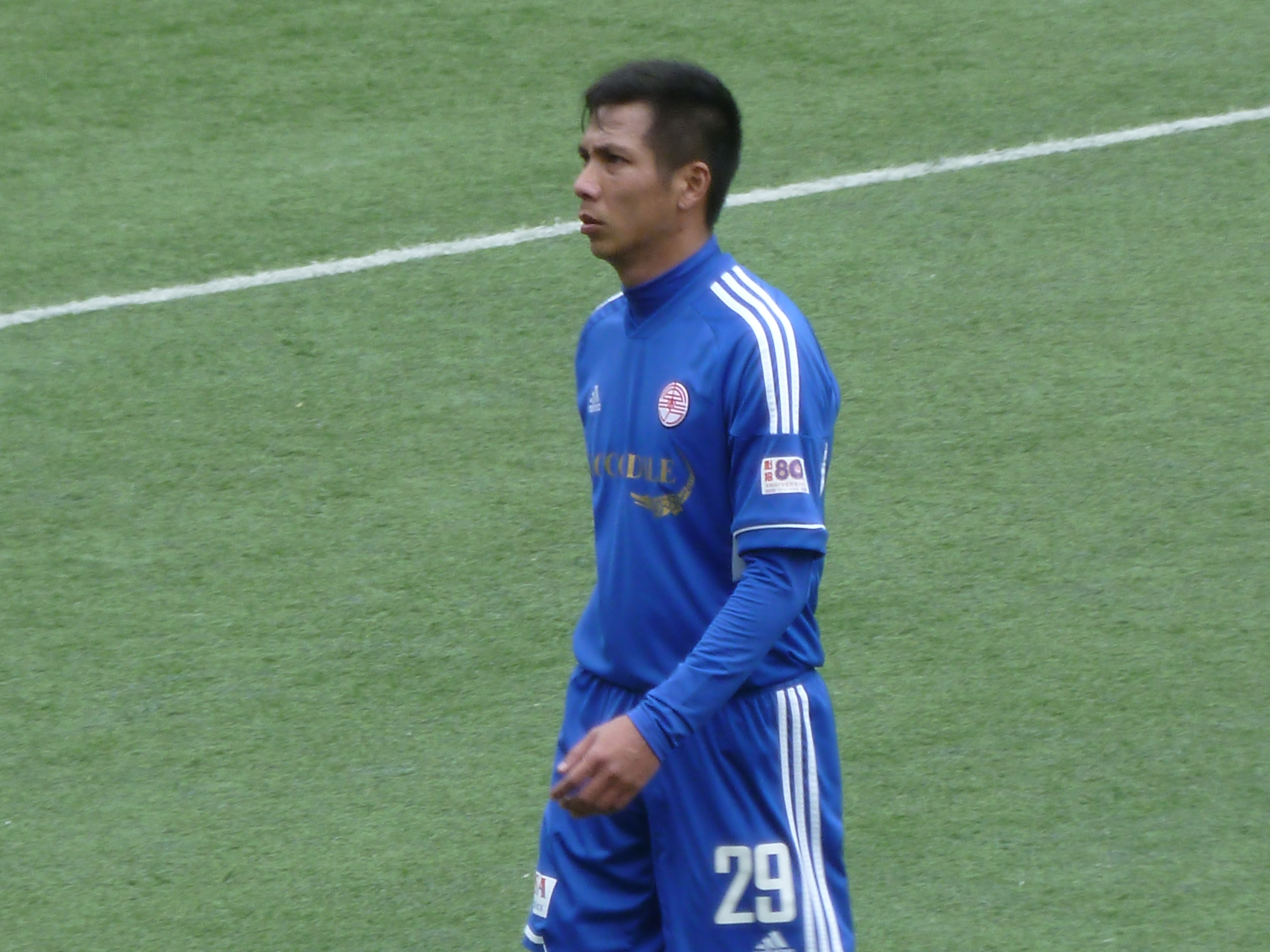
Yiu Hok Man became the first Hong Kong player in the Hong Kong Premier League to score a hat-trick in December 2014.

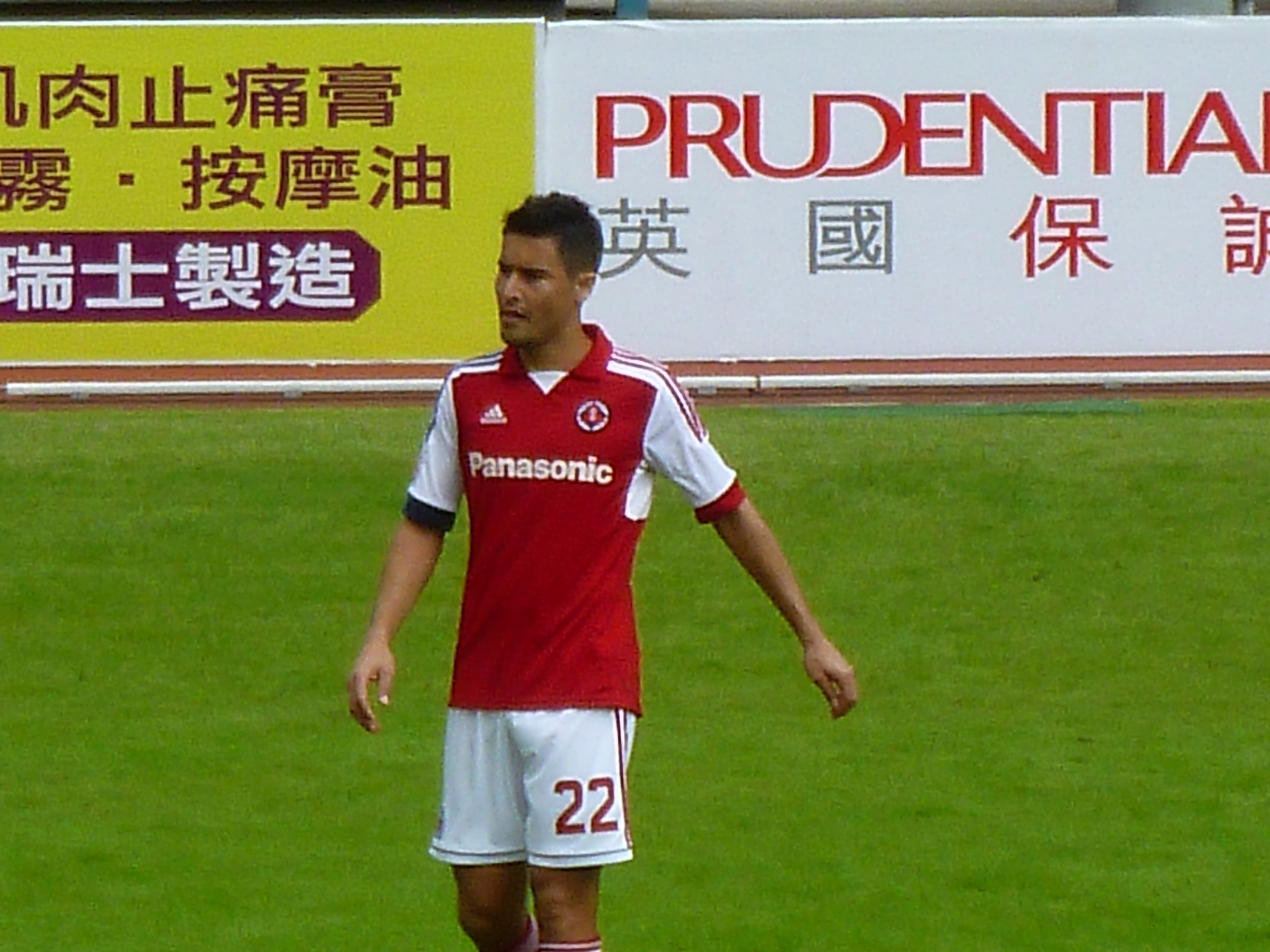
Giovane scored four goals against YFCMD in Eastern's 4–1 victory in April 2015.

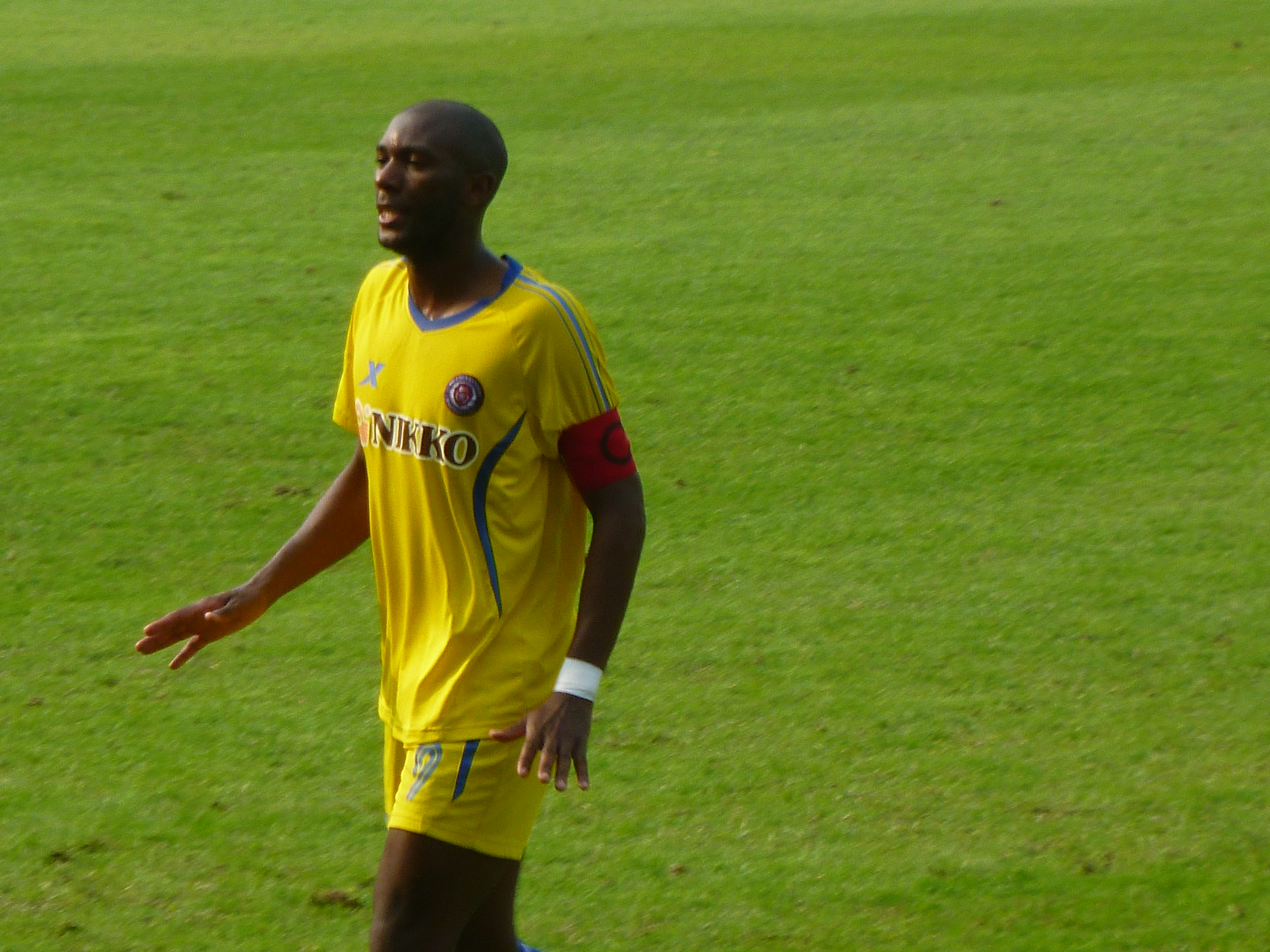
Sandro scored three hat-tricks for Kitchee.

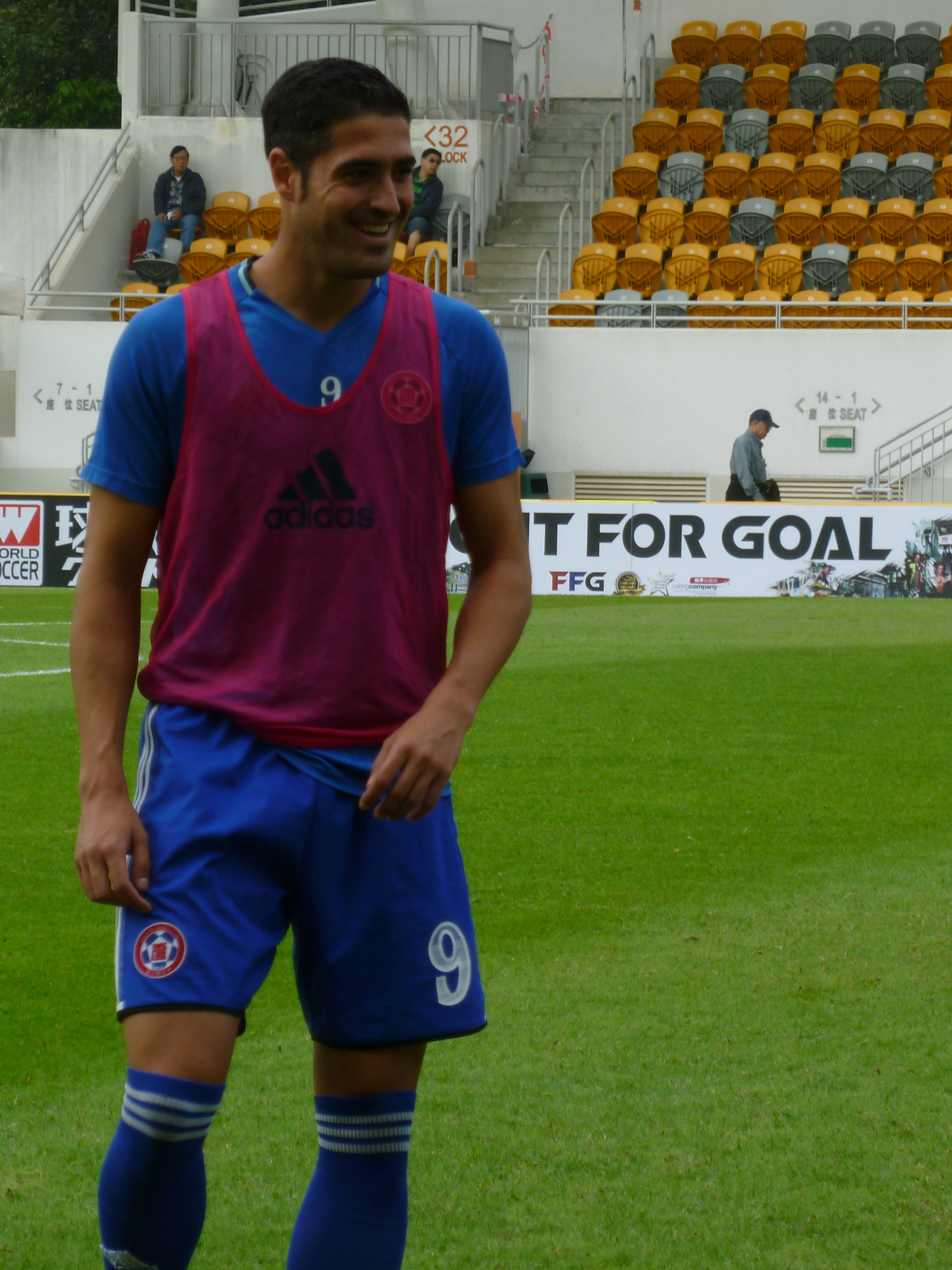
Manolo Bleda scored three hat-tricks for Eastern.

Key
Player (X)	Player name (count of multiple hat-tricks if applicable)
**Bold**	Team hat-trick scored for
^{4 5}	Player scored four or five goals
^{D L}	Player was not on the winning team (game drawn or lost)

#	Player	Home team	Result	Away team	Date	Ref
1	(Brazil) Itaparica	Rangers	1–**4**	South China	4 October 2014	
2	(Hong Kong) Yiu Hok Man	Eastern	**7**–1	Tai Po	7 December 2014	
3	(Japan) Kenji Fukuda	YFCMD	**5**–2	Tai Po	18 January 2015	
4	(Brazil) Giovane^{4} (1)	YFCMD	1–**4**	Eastern	19 April 2015	
5	(Netherlands) Vincent Weijl^{D}	Tai Po	**3**–3	Kitchee	2 May 2015	
6	(Spain) Jordi Tarrés (1)	Kitchee	**4**–0	Yuen Long	12 September 2015	
7	(Brazil) Giovane (2)	Yuen Long	1–**6**	Eastern	13 December 2015	
8	(Brazil) Souza (1)	Southern	**7**–0	HKFC	22 October 2016	
9	(Spain) Manolo Bleda^{4} (1)	Eastern	**6**–2	Biu Chun Glory Sky	2 November 2016	
10	(Brazil) Stefan Pereira (1)	Yuen Long	**4**–0	Biu Chun Glory Sky	19 November 2016	
11	(Brazil) Everton Camargo (1)	HKFC	1–**4**	Biu Chun Glory Sky	17 March 2017	
12	(Hong Kong) Sandro (1)	Kitchee	**5**–1	Rangers	19 March 2017	
13	(Spain) Marc Jiménez	R&F	0–**5**	Southern	1 April 2017	
14	(Brazil) Giovane (3)	Pegasus	3–**5**	Eastern	1 April 2017	
15	(Spain) Rufino (1)	Biu Chun Glory Sky	1–**5**	Kitchee	2 April 2017	
16	(Spain) Rufino^{4} (2)	Kitchee	**10**–0	HKFC	7 April 2017	
17	(Hong Kong) Sandro^{4} (2)	Kitchee	**10**–0	HKFC	7 April 2017	
18	(Spain) Jordi Tarrés^{D} (2)	Rangers	**3**–3	Eastern	8 April 2017	
19	(Hong Kong) Sandro (3)	Eastern	1–**4**	Kitchee	6 May 2017	
20	(Brazil) Lucas Silva^{D} (1)	Biu Chun Glory Sky	3–**3**	Tai Po	6 May 2017	
21	(Brazil) Lucas Silva^{4} (2)	Kitchee	**7**–0	Dreams FC	10 September 2017	
22	(Brazil) Lucas Silva (3)	Eastern	1–**8**	Kitchee	18 January 2018	
23	(Uruguay) Diego Forlán	Lee Man	1–**5**	Kitchee	3 February 2018	
24	(Spain) Manolo Bleda (2)	Eastern	**4**–0	Dreams FC	6 October 2018	
25	(Brazil) Robert	Kitchee	**8**–1	Hoi King	4 November 2018	
26	(Spain) Marcos Gondra	Dreams FC	**4**–1	Yuen Long	17 February 2019	
27	(Hong Kong) James Ha (1)	Eastern	1–**4**	Southern	17 February 2019	
28	(Spain) Manolo Bleda (3)	Hoi King	0–**5**	Eastern	17 March 2019	
29	(Brazil) Tiago Leonço	Dreams FC	1–**5**	R&F	6 April 2019	
30	(France) Michaël N'dri	Lee Man	**4**–2	Pegasus	1 September 2019	
31	(Ivory Coast) Serges Déblé^{4} (1)	R&F	**8**–0	Yuen Long	19 October 2019	
32	(Ivory Coast) Serges Déblé (2)	R&F	**5**–1	Lee Man	2 November 2019	
33	(Ivory Coast) Serges Déblé (3)	Happy Valley	2–**5**	R&F	25 September 2020	
34	(Brazil) Souza (2)	Kitchee	**4**–0	Happy Valley	11 October 2020	
35	(Macau) Leong Ka Hang	Southern	0–**4**	Lee Man	11 October 2020	
36	(Brazil) Stefan Pereira (2)	Pegasus	0–**4**	Southern	21 November 2020	
37	(Brazil) Marquinhos	Lee Man	1–**3**	Pegasus	11 April 2021	
38	(Montenegro) Dejan Damjanović (1)	Happy Valley	1–**3**	Kitchee	16 April 2021	
39	(Hong Kong) James Ha (2)	Southern	**4**–1	Resources Capital	5 May 2021	
40	(Montenegro) Dejan Damjanović (2)	Kitchee	**3**–1	Rangers	7 May 2021	
41	(Brazil) Gil (1)	Lee Man	**4**–0	Resources Capital	9 May 2021	
42	(Brazil) Luciano	Happy Valley	**7**–2	Resources Capital	22 May 2021	
43	(Brazil) Gil (2)	Pegasus	1–**5**	Lee Man	23 May 2021	
44	(Brazil) Stefan Pereira (3)	Southern	**3**–0	HKFC	25 October 2021	
45	(Montenegro) Dejan Damjanović (3)	Kitchee	**6**–0	HK U23	30 October 2021	
46	(Brazil) Stefan Pereira (4)	Southern	**4**–1	HK U23	6 November 2021	
47	(Argentina) Leandro Bazán	HKFC	2–**3**	Rangers	7 November 2021	
48	(Spain) Manolo Bleda^{5} (4)	Lee Man	**10**–0	HK U23	15 October 2022	
49	(Turkmenistan) Ruslan Mingazow	Kitchee	**7**–0	Southern	15 October 2022	
50	(Brazil) Felipe Sá	HK U23	0–**3**	Resources Capital	30 October 2022	
51	(Montenegro) Dejan Damjanović (4)	HK U23	0–**7**	Kitchee	12 November 2022	
52	(Brazil) Stefan Pereira (5)	Southern	**3**–0	Sham Shui Po	26 November 2022	
53	(Brazil) Stefan Pereira (6)	HK U23	1–**3**	Southern	4 February 2023	
54	(Brazil) Everton Camargo (2)	HK U23	1–**5**	Lee Man	15 April 2023	
55	(South Korea) Kim Shin-Wook	Kitchee	**8**–0	HKFC	27 August 2023	
56	(Ghana) Nassam Ibrahim (1)	Rangers	**9**–0	Sham Shui Po	27 August 2023	
57	(Hong Kong) Lau Chi Lok (1)	Rangers	**9**–0	Sham Shui Po	27 August 2023	
58	(Brazil) Mikael (1)	Kitchee	**5**–1	Sham Shui Po	29 October 2023	
59	(Brazil) Paulinho Simionato	Lee Man	**4**–1	Resources Capital	3 March 2024	
60	(Hong Kong) Nicholas Benavides	Sham Shui Po	**3**–1	Rangers	3 March 2024	
61	(Spain) Noah Baffoe^{4} (1)	Eastern	**6**–0	HK U23	21 April 2024	
62	(Brazil) Mikael (2)	Kitchee	**6**–0	HK U23	28 April 2024	
63	(Spain) Noah Baffoe (2)	Eastern	**5**–0	HKFC	22 May 2024	
64	(Hong Kong) Lau Chi Lok (2)	Rangers	**3**–1	HKFC	15 September 2024	
65	(Uzbekistan) Sherzod Temirov	Kitchee	**6**–1	Kowloon City	25 September 2024	
66	(Hong Kong) Stefan Pereira (Note: Pereira was granted the HKSAR passport on 12 December 2023) (7)	HKFC	3–**4**	Southern	10 November 2024	
67	(Brazil) Lucas Silva (4)	Rangers	2–**5**	Tai Po	21 December 2024	
68	(Brazil) Lucas Silva (5)	Kowloon City	2–**5**	Tai Po	9 March 2025	
69	(Brazil) Michel Renner	Lee Man	3–**7**	Tai Po	30 March 2025	
70	(Brazil) Kayron	Kowloon City	**5**–3	Tai Po	25 May 2025	
71	(Hong Kong) Everton Camargo (Note: Everton was granted the HKSAR passport on 31 August 2023) (3)	Lee Man	**7**–1	HKFC	1 November 2025	
72	(Hong Kong) Juninho	Kitchee	**5**–0	Kowloon City	2 November 2025	
73	(Spain) Noah Baffoe (3)	Tai Po	3–**5**	Lee Man	17 January 2026	
74	(Hong Kong) Everton Camargo (4)	Lee Man	**8**–1	Eastern	24 January 2026	
75	(Ghana) Nassam Ibrahim (2)	Rangers	**5**–2	HKFC	25 January 2026	
76	(Brazil) Luizinho	Kowloon City	**5**–1	Rangers	1 March 2026	
77	(Hong Kong) Stefan Pereira (8)	HKFC	1–**4**	Southern	3 May 2026	
78	(Japan) Yu Okubo	Kitchee	4–**4**	Eastern	17 May 2026	
79	(Brazil) Samuel Granada	North District	**5**–0	Rangers	13 September 2026	

== Multiple hat-tricks ==
As of 13 September 2026

The following table lists the minimum number of hat-tricks scored by players who have scored two or more hat-tricks.

Players in bold are still active in the Hong Kong Premier League.

Rank	Player	Hat-tricks
1	(Hong Kong) **Stefan Pereira** (Note: Pereira was granted the HKSAR passport on 12 December 2023)	8
2	(Brazil) **Lucas Silva**	5
3	(Spain) **Manolo Bleda**	4
3	(Hong Kong) **Everton Camargo** (Note: Everton was granted the HKSAR passport on 31 August 2023)	4
3	(Montenegro) Dejan Damjanović	4
6	(Spain) **Noah Baffoe**	3
6	(Ivory Coast) Serges Déblé	3
6	(Brazil) Giovane	3
6	(Hong Kong) Sandro	3
10	(Brazil) **Gil**	2
10	(Hong Kong) James Ha	2
10	(Ghana) **Nassam Ibrahim**	2
10	(Hong Kong) **Lau Chi Lok**	2
10	(Brazil) Mikael	2
10	(Spain) Rufino	2
10	(Brazil) Souza	2
10	(Spain) Jordi Tarrés	2

== Hat-tricks by nationality ==
The following table lists the number of hat-tricks scored by players from a single nation.

Rank	Nationality	Hat-tricks	Last hat-trick
1	Brazil	33	13 September 2026
2	Hong Kong	14	3 May 2026
3	Spain	13	17 January 2026
4	Montenegro	4	12 November 2022
5	Ivory Coast	3	25 September 2020
6	Ghana	2	25 January 2026
6	Japan	2	17 May 2026
8	Netherlands	1	2 May 2015
8	Uruguay	1	3 February 2018
8	France	1	1 September 2019
8	Macau	1	11 October 2020
8	Argentina	1	7 November 2021
8	Turkmenistan	1	15 October 2022
8	South Korea	1	27 August 2023
8	Uzbekistan	1	25 September 2024
