= List of Rugby League World Cup hat-tricks =

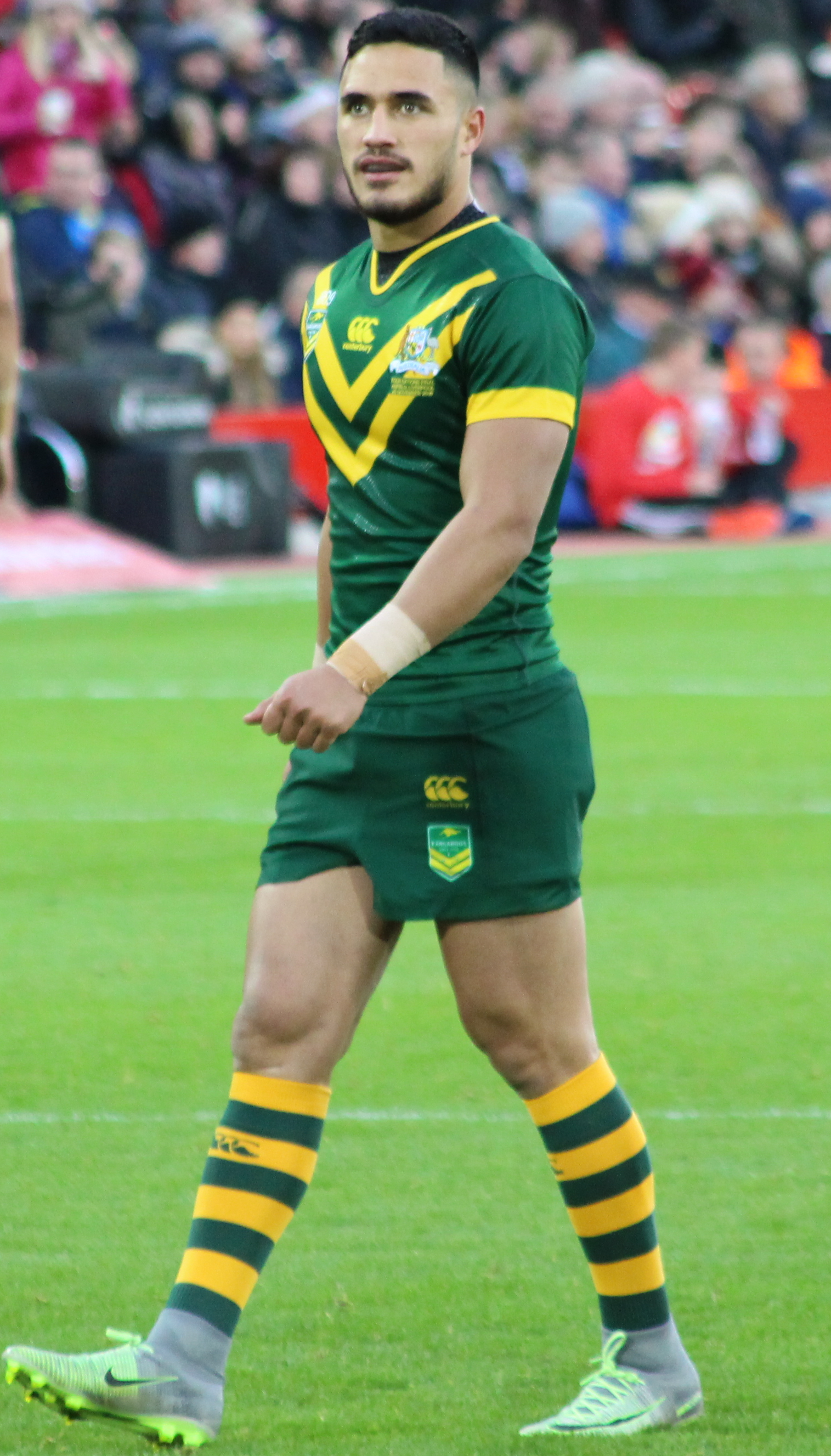
Valentine Holmes scored 11 tries in two matches in the 2017 World Cup against Samoa and Fiji.

The Rugby League World Cup is an international rugby league tournament which has been played at various intervals since 1954. Hat-tricks have been achieved 83 times at the tournament, 81 times with tries and twice with field goals. The first player to do this was Alex Watson, who achieved the feat for Australia against New Zealand in the inaugural tournament. Players who have played for Australia have scored the most hat-tricks with 34 (33 tries 1 field goal), while France representatives have conceded the most with 14 (12 tries 1 field goal).

Hat-tricks are a more common occurrence in the group stages, as the match-ups usually place higher-ranked teams against lower-ranked teams. Just ten hat-tricks have occurred in the knockout stages, six happening in the quarter-finals and four in the semi-finals. They have been scored by Bryan Fletcher and Robbie Paul in the 2000 tournament, Billy Slater and Johnathan Thurston in the 2008 edition, Jarryd Hayne (twice) and Brett Morris in the 2013 competition, Valentine Holmes (twice) in the 2017 tournament and Josh Addo-Carr in the 2021 edition. No hat-tricks have been scored in a final.

Out of the 81 hat-tricks scored, ten people have achieved the feat twice, these being Ian Schubert, Billy Slater, Akuila Uate, Manu Vatuvei, Jarryd Hayne, Suliasi Vunivalu, Valentine Holmes, Josh Addo-Carr, Dom Young, Tom Trbojevic, and Jack Bostock. 17 people have scored an additional try on top of the hat-trick. Holmes and Addo-Carr have scored five tries in a single game, whilst Holmes is the only player to score six tries in a single game. Seven players have scored hat-tricks while being on the losing side, these being Bob Fulton, Ian Schubert, Damien Blanch, Chris Taripo, Esom Ioka, and Semi Valemei with tries, and Don Ladner, whose hat-trick of field goals for New Zealand came in their loss to Australia in the 1970 tournament. Billy Smith was the first player to score a hat-trick of field goals, doing so for Australia against France in the 1968 tournament.

The 2026 tournament featured the first match to have hat-tricks scored on both sides, as Esom Ioka and Jamayne Isaako both scored three tries each in New Zealand's 82–16 win over the Cook Islands. This feat was later repeated in Australia's 34–22 win over Fiji on the same day, as Tom Trbojevic and Semi Valemei scored three tries apiece for Australia and Fiji respectively.

== Hat-tricks ==
Key
Player	The player who scored the hat-trick
For	The team the player scored the hat-trick for
Result	The result of the match
Against	The team the player scored the hat-trick against
Tournament	The tournament the hat-trick was scored in
Stage	The stage of the tournament at which the hat-trick was scored
Venue	The stadium and city where the match was played
Date	The date the hat-trick was scored
^{4}	Player scored four tries
^{5}	Player scored five tries
^{6}	Player scored six tries

=== Tries ===
Rugby League World Cup hat-tricks by player
No.	Player	For	Result	Against	Tournament	Stage	Venue	Date	Reference
1	Alex Watson	Australia	34–15	New Zealand	1954	Group	Stade Vélodrome, Marseille	7 November 1954	
2	Brian Carlson	Australia	21–15	New Zealand	1960	Group	Headingley, Leeds	1 October 1960	
3	Clive Sullivan	Great Britain	38–14	New Zealand	1968	Group	Sydney Cricket Ground, Sydney	8 June 1968	
4	Bob Fulton	Australia	21–27	Great Britain	1972	Group	Stade Gilbert Brutus, Perpignan	29 October 1972	
5	Keith Fielding^{4}	England	48–2	France	1975	Group	Stade Chaban-Delmas, Bordeaux	11 October 1975	
6	Ian Schubert	Australia	18–6	Wales	1975	Group	St. Helen's, Swansea	19 October 1975	
7	Ken Gill	England	27–12	New Zealand	1975	Group	Odsal Stadium, Bradford	25 October 1975	
8	Ian Schubert	Australia	13–16	England	1975	Group	Central Park, Wigan	1 November 1975	
9	Dale Shearer^{4}	Australia	52–0	France	1985–88	Group	Stade Albert Domec, Carcassonne	13 December 1986	
10	Garry Jack	Australia	52–0	France	1985–88	Group	Stade Albert Domec, Carcassonne	13 December 1986	
11	Shane Horo	New Zealand	66–14	Papua New Guinea	1985–88	Group	Carlaw Park, Auckland	10 July 1988	
12	Kevin Iro	New Zealand	66–14	Papua New Guinea	1985–88	Group	Carlaw Park, Auckland	10 July 1988	
13	Michael O'Connor^{4}	Australia	70–8	Papua New Guinea	1985–88	Group	Eric Weissel Oval, Wagga Wagga	20 July 1988	
14	Dave Watson	New Zealand	34–0	France	1989–92	Group	Stade Albert Domec, Carcassonne	3 December 1989	
15	Brad Mackay	Australia	34–2	France	1989–92	Group	Pioneer Oval, Parkes	27 June 1990	
16	Willie Carne	Australia	40–6	Papua New Guinea	1989–92	Group	PNG Football Stadium, Port Moresby	13 October 1991	
17	Richie Blackmore	New Zealand	66–10	Papua New Guinea	1989–92	Group	Mount Smart Stadium, Auckland	5 July 1992	
18	Anthony Sullivan	Wales	28–6	France	1995	Group	Ninian Park, Cardiff	9 October 1995	
19	John Hopoate	Australia	86–6	South Africa	1995	Group	Gateshead International Stadium, Gateshead	10 October 1995	
20	Brett Dallas	Australia	66–0	Fiji	1995	Group	Kirklees Stadium, Huddersfield	14 October 1995	
21	Tevita Vaikona^{4}	Tonga	66–18	South Africa	2000	Group	Stade Sébastien Charléty, Paris	28 October 2000	
22	Atunaisa Vunivalu	Fiji	38–12	Russia	2000	Group	Craven Park, Hull	29 October 2000	
23	Kris Tassell	Wales	38–6	Cook Islands	2000	Group	Racecourse Ground, Wrexham	29 October 2000	
24	Mat Rogers^{4}	Australia	66–8	Fiji	2000	Group	Gateshead International Stadium, Gateshead	1 November 2000	
25	Kevin Sinfield	England	76–4	Russia	2000	Group	Knowsley Road, St Helens	1 November 2000	
26	Jamie Peacock	England	66–10	Fiji	2000	Group	Headingley, Leeds	4 November 2000	
27	Wendell Sailor^{4}	Australia	110–4	Russia	2000	Group	The Boulevard, Hull	4 November 2000	
28	Ryan Girdler	Australia	110–4	Russia	2000	Group	The Boulevard, Hull	4 November 2000	
29	Lesley Vainikolo	New Zealand	58–18	Wales	2000	Group	Millennium Stadium, Cardiff	5 November 2000	
30	Pascal Jampy	France	56–6	South Africa	2000	Group	Stadium Municipal, Toulouse	5 November 2000	
31	Bryan Fletcher	Australia	66–10	Samoa	2000	Quarter-final	Vicarage Road, Watford	11 November 2000	
32	Robbie Paul	New Zealand	54–6	France	2000	Quarter-final	Wheldon Road, Castleford	12 November 2000	
33	Lee Smith	England	32–22	Papua New Guinea	2008	Group	Willows Sports Complex, Townsville	25 October 2008	
34	Damien Blanch	Ireland	20–22	Tonga	2008	Group	Parramatta Stadium, Parramatta	27 October 2008	
35	Akuila Uate	Fiji	42–6	France	2008	Group	Wollongong Showground, Wollongong	1 November 2008	
36	Billy Slater	Australia	52–4	England	2008	Group	Docklands Stadium, Melbourne	2 November 2008	
37	Pat Richards	Ireland	34–16	Samoa	2008	Group	Parramatta Stadium, Parramatta	5 November 2008	
38	Manu Vatuvei^{4}	New Zealand	36–24	England	2008	Group	Newcastle International Sports Centre, Newcastle	8 November 2008	
39	David Williams	Australia	46–6	Papua New Guinea	2008	Group	Willows Sports Complex, Townsville	9 November 2008	
40	Billy Slater	Australia	52–0	Fiji	2008	Semi-final	Sydney Football Stadium, Sydney	16 November 2008	
41	Johnathan Thurston	Australia	52–0	Fiji	2008	Semi-final	Sydney Football Stadium, Sydney	16 November 2008	
42	Manu Vatuvei	New Zealand	42–24	Samoa	2013	Group	Halliwell Jones Stadium, Warrington	27 October 2013	
43	Akuila Uate	Fiji	32–14	Ireland	2013	Group	Spotland Stadium, Rochdale	28 October 2013	
44	Ryan Hall	England	42–0	Ireland	2013	Group	Kirklees Stadium, Huddersfield	2 November 2013	
45	Antonio Winterstein	Samoa	38–4	Papua New Guinea	2013	Group	Craven Park, Hull	4 November 2013	
46	Chris Taripo	Cook Islands	16–22	Tonga	2013	Group	Leigh Sports Village, Leigh	5 November 2013	
47	Sonny Bill Williams	New Zealand	56–10	Papua New Guinea	2013	Group	Headingley, Leeds	8 November 2013	
48	Jarryd Hayne^{4}	Australia	62–0	United States	2013	Quarter-final	Racecourse Ground, Wrexham	16 November 2013	
49	Brett Morris^{4}	Australia	62–0	United States	2013	Quarter-final	Racecourse Ground, Wrexham	16 November 2013	
50	Jarryd Hayne	Australia	64–0	Fiji	2013	Semi-final	Wembley Stadium, London	23 November 2013	
51	David Mead	Papua New Guinea	50–6	Wales	2017	Group	PNG Football Stadium, Port Moresby	28 October 2017	
52	Michael Jennings	Tonga	50–4	Scotland	2017	Group	Barlow Park, Cairns	29 October 2017	
53	Wade Graham^{4}	Australia	52–6	France	2017	Group	Canberra Stadium, Canberra	3 November 2017	
54	Te Maire Martin	New Zealand	74–6	Scotland	2017	Group	Rugby League Park, Christchurch	4 November 2017	
55	Suliasi Vunivalu	Fiji	72–6	Wales	2017	Group	Willows Sports Complex, Townsville	5 November 2017	
56	Suliasi Vunivalu	Fiji	38–10	Italy	2017	Group	Canberra Stadium, Canberra	10 November 2017	
57	David Fusitu'a	Tonga	28–22	New Zealand	2017	Group	Waikato Stadium, Hamilton	11 November 2017	
58	Justin Olam	Papua New Guinea	64–0	United States	2017	Group	PNG Football Stadium, Port Moresby	12 November 2017	
59	Valentine Holmes^{5}	Australia	46–0	Samoa	2017	Quarter-final	Darwin Stadium, Darwin	17 November 2017	
60	Valentine Holmes^{6}	Australia	54–6	Fiji	2017	Semi-final	Brisbane Stadium, Brisbane	24 November 2017	
61	Jake Maizen	Italy	28–4	Scotland	2021	Group	Kingston Park, Newcastle	16 October 2022	
62	Josh Addo-Carr^{4}	Australia	84–0	Scotland	2021	Group	Coventry Building Society Arena, Coventry	21 October 2022	
63	Campbell Graham	Australia	84–0	Scotland	2021	Group	Coventry Building Society Arena, Coventry	21 October 2022	
64	Dallin Watene-Zelezniak^{4}	New Zealand	68–6	Jamaica	2021	Group	MKM Stadium, Hull	22 October 2022	
65	Daniel Tupou	Tonga	32–6	Wales	2021	Group	Totally Wicked Stadium, St Helens	24 October 2022	
66	Dom Young^{4}	England	94–4	Greece	2021	Group	Bramall Lane, Sheffield	29 October 2022	
67	Tesi Niu	Tonga	92–10	Cook Islands	2021	Group	Riverside Stadium, Middlesbrough	30 October 2022	
68	Will Penisini^{4}	Tonga	92–10	Cook Islands	2021	Group	Riverside Stadium, Middlesbrough	30 October 2022	
69	Taylan May^{4}	Samoa	62–4	France	2021	Group	Halliwell Jones Stadium, Warrington	30 October 2022	
70	Josh Addo-Carr^{5}	Australia	48–4	Lebanon	2021	Quarter-final	Kirklees Stadium, Huddersfield	4 November 2022	
71	Jack Bostock	Australia	24–22	New Zealand	2026	Group	Allianz Stadium, Sydney	15 October 2026	
72	Sua Fa'alogo^{4}	Samoa	78–4	France	2026	Group	Commbank Stadium, Sydney	16 October 2026	
73	Herbie Farnworth	England	82–0	France	2026	Group	HBF Park, Perth	24 October 2026	
74	Dom Young	England	82–0	France	2026	Group	HBF Park, Perth	24 October 2026	
75	Esom Ioka	Cook Islands	16–82	New Zealand	2026	Group	One NZ Stadium, Christchurch	25 October 2026	
76	Jamayne Isaako	New Zealand	82–16	Cook Islands	2026	Group	One NZ Stadium, Christchurch	25 October 2026	
77	Tom Trbojevic	Australia	36–22	Fiji	2026	Group	Suncorp Stadium, Brisbane	25 October 2026	
78	Semi Valemei	Fiji	22–36	Australia	2026	Group	Suncorp Stadium, Brisbane	25 October 2026	
79	Casey McLean^{4}	New Zealand	78–0	Fiji	2026	Group	Cbus Super Stadium, Gold Coast	31 October 2026	
80	Tom Trbojevic	Australia	66–6	Cook Islands	2026	Group	Queensland Country Bank Stadium, Townsville	31 October 2026	
81	Jack Bostock	Australia	66–6	Cook Islands	2026	Group	Queensland Country Bank Stadium, Townsville	31 October 2026	

=== Field goals ===
Rugby League World Cup field goals
No.	Player	For	Result	Against	Tournament	Stage	Venue	Date	Reference
1	Billy Smith	Australia	37–4	France	1968	Group	Lang Park, Brisbane	8 June 1968	
2	Don Ladner	New Zealand	11–47	Australia	1970	Group	Central Park, Wigan	21 October 1970	

=== Multiple hat-tricks ===
Multiple Rugby League World Cup hat-tricks by player
Player	No.	Tournament(s)
(Australia) Ian Schubert	2	1975
(Australia) Billy Slater	2	2008
(Fiji) Akuila Uate	2	2008, 2013
(New Zealand) Manu Vatuvei	2	2008, 2013
(Australia) Jarryd Hayne	2	2013
(Fiji) Suliasi Vunivalu	2	2017
(Australia) Valentine Holmes	2	2017
(Australia) Josh Addo-Carr	2	2021
(England) Dom Young	2	2021, 2026
(Australia) Tom Trbojevic	2	2026
(Australia) Jack Bostock	2	2026

=== Hat-tricks by each national team ===
Rugby League World Cup hat-tricks by national team
Team	Hat-tricks for (tries)	Hat-tricks against (tries)	Hat-tricks for (field goals)	Hat-tricks against (field goals)	Hat-tricks for (total)	Hat-tricks against (total)
Australia	33	1	1	1	34	2
New Zealand	13	7	1	0	14	7
England	9	3	0	0	9	3
Fiji	6	9	0	0	6	9
Tonga	6	2	0	0	6	2
Samoa	3	3	0	0	3	3
Papua New Guinea	2	11	0	0	2	11
Wales	2	5	0	0	2	5
Cook Islands	2	5	0	0	2	5
Ireland	2	2	0	0	2	2
France	1	13	0	1	1	14
Great Britain	1	1	0	0	1	1
Italy	1	1	0	0	1	1
Scotland	0	5	0	0	0	5
Russia	0	4	0	0	0	4
South Africa	0	3	0	0	0	3
United States	0	3	0	0	0	3
Jamaica	0	1	0	0	0	1
Greece	0	1	0	0	0	1
Lebanon	0	1	0	0	0	1
