= 2023 Club Universitario de Deportes season =

Universitario de Deportes
2023 season
- Chairman: Jean Ferrari
- Manager: Carlos Compagnucci; Jorge Araujo (interim); Jorge Fossati
- Stadium: Estadio Monumental
- Peruvian Primera División: 3rd
- Copa Sudamericana: Knockout round play-offs
- Top goalscorer: League: Alex Valera (12); All: Alex Valera (13)
- Biggest win: 4–0: vs Cantolao; vs Vallejo
Home colours	Away colours	Third colours

The 2023 season was Universitario de Deportes' 99th season since its founding in 1924. The club played the Liga 1 and the Copa Sudamericana.

== Squad ==
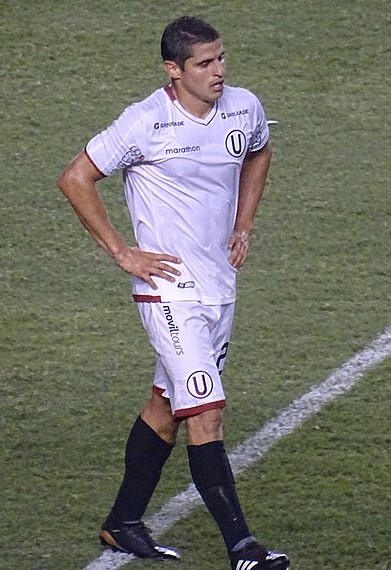
Aldo Corzo, team captain

As of 26 June 2023

Note: Flags indicate national team as defined under FIFA eligibility rules; some limited exceptions apply. Players may hold more than one non-FIFA nationality.

No.	Pos.	Nation	Player
1	GK	PER	José Carvallo
2	DF	PER	Marco Saravia
3	DF	PAR	Williams Riveros (on loan from Barcelona S.C.)
4	MF	PER	Alfonso Barco
5	DF	ARG	Matías Di Benedetto
7	FW	PER	Alexander Succar
10	MF	PER	Horacio Calcaterra
11	FW	URU	Luis Urruti
12	GK	PER	Aamet Calderón
14	DF	PER	José Bolívar
15	FW	ARG	Emanuel Herrera
16	MF	ARG	Martín Pérez Guedes
17	FW	PER	José Rivera
18	MF	CHI	Rodrigo Ureña
19	MF	PER	Edison Flores

No.	Pos.	Nation	Player
20	FW	PER	Alex Valera
21	GK	PER	Diego Romero
23	MF	PER	Jorge Murrugarra
24	FW	PER	Andy Polo
25	FW	PER	Roberto Siucho
26	DF	PER	Hugo Ancajima
27	DF	PER	Nelson Cabanillas
29	DF	PER	Aldo Corzo (captain)
30	DF	PER	Piero Guzmán
31	DF	PER	Jerry Navarro
34	GK	PER	Alejandro Alcalá
35	MF	PER	Josué Oré
36	MF	PER	Piero Quispe
37	MF	PER	Álvaro Rojas
77	MF	PER	Yuriel Celi (on loan from Hull City)

== Technical staff ==
Universitario de Deportes began the season with Carlos Compagnucci as manager, but after poor results in the Liga 1 he was dismissed from his position and the experienced Jorge Fossati came to replace him.

Current

Position	Name
Manager	(Uruguay) Jorge Fossati
Assistant manager	(Uruguay) Leonardo Martins
Assistant manager	(Uruguay) Enrique Gutiérrez
Physical trainer	(Uruguay) Sebastián Avellino
Technical advisor	(Peru) Héctor Chumpitaz
Goalkeeper manager	(Peru) Ángel Venegas

== Transfers ==
=== In ===
Pos.	Player	From	Source
FW	(Peru) José Rivera	(Peru) Carlos A. Mannucci	
MF	(Argentina) Martín Pérez Guedes	(Peru) F. B. C. Melgar	
DF	(Peru) Hugo Ancajima	(Peru) Asociación Deportiva Tarma	
DF	(Peru) José Bolívar	(Peru) Sport Boys	
DF	(Argentina) Matías Di Benedetto	(Argentina) Central Córdoba	
DF	(Peru) Marco Saravia	(Peru) Deportivo Municipal	
DF	(Paraguay) Williams Riveros	(Paraguay) Cerro Porteño	
MF	(Peru) Horacio Calcaterra	(Peru) Sporting Cristal	
MF	(Peru) Yuriel Celi	(England) Hull City	
MF	(Peru) Edison Flores	(Mexico) Atlas F. C.	
MF	(Chile) Rodrigo Ureña	(Colombia) Deportes Tolima	
FW	(Peru) Roberto Siucho	(China) Kunshan F. C.	
FW	(Argentina) Emanuel Herrera	(Mexico) Celaya F. C.	
FW	(Peru) Álex Valera	(Saudi Arabia) Al-Fateh	

=== Out ===
Pos.	Player	From	Source
MF	(Peru) Rafael Guarderas	(Peru) Academia Cantolao	
FW	(Peru) Joao Villamarín	(Peru) Carlos Mannucci	
DF	(Uruguay) Federico Alonso	(Peru) Cusco FC	
MF	(Peru) Alfonso Barco	(Uruguay) Defensor Sporting	

== Kits ==
Supplier: Marathon / Sponsor: apuesta total

Home	Home alt.	Away	Away alt.	Third

== Friendlies ==
Noche Poeta	Cesar Vallejo	0–2	Universitario	Trujillo
		Report	Urruti 44'; Polo 57'	Stadium: Mansiche

Noche Crema	Universitario	0–0	Aucas	Lima
		Report		Stadium: Monumental

Noche Albirroja	Curico Unido	1–0	Universitario	Curico
	Fritz 93'	Report		Stadium: La Granja

Ñublense	3–2	Universitario	Chillan
	Report		Stadium: Nelson Oyarzun

== Competitions ==
=== Overall ===
Competition	First match	Last match	Starting round	Final position	Record							
Competition	First match	Last match	Starting round	Final position	Pld	W	D	L	GF	GA	GD	Win %
Liga 1	4 March 2023		Matchday 1	3rd	28	17	4	7	44	19	+25	60.71
Copa Sudamericana	9 March 2023	18 July 2023	First stage	Knockout round play-offs	9	4	1	4	9	8	+1	44.44
Total					37	21	5	11	53	27	+26	56.76

Last updated: 16 August 2023
Source: Competitions

=== Liga 1 ===
==== Apertura ====
Pos	Team	Pld	W	D	L	GF	GA	GD	Pts
3	Universitario	18	11	1	6	29	14	+15	34

Results

Home \ Away	ADT	AAS	ALI	CAG	BIN	CAN	CAM	CIE	CUS	GAR	MUN	MEL	SBA	SHU	CRI	UCO	UCV	UNI	UTC
ADT	—	—	—	—	—	—	—	—	—	—	—	—	—	—	—	—	—	—	—
Alianza Atlético	—	—	—	—	—	—	—	—	—	—	—	—	—	—	—	—	—	3–1	—
Alianza Lima	—	—	—	—	—	—	—	—	—	—	—	—	—	—	—	—	—	—	—
Atlético Grau	—	—	—	—	—	—	—	—	—	—	—	—	—	—	—	—	—	—	—
Binacional	—	—	—	—	—	—	—	—	—	—	—	—	—	—	—	—	—	1–2	—
Cantolao	—	—	—	—	—	—	—	—	—	—	—	—	—	—	—	—	—	—	—
Carlos A. Mannucci	—	—	—	—	—	—	—	—	—	—	—	—	—	—	—	—	—	2–0	—
Cienciano	—	—	—	—	—	—	—	—	—	—	—	—	—	—	—	—	—	—	—
Cusco	—	—	—	—	—	—	—	—	—	—	—	—	—	—	—	—	—	—	—
Deportivo Garcilaso	—	—	—	—	—	—	—	—	—	—	—	—	—	—	—	—	—	0–0	—
Deportivo Municipal	—	—	—	—	—	—	—	—	—	—	—	—	—	—	—	—	—	1–2	—
Melgar	—	—	—	—	—	—	—	—	—	—	—	—	—	—	—	—	—	—	—
Sport Boys	—	—	—	—	—	—	—	—	—	—	—	—	—	—	—	—	—	0–3	—
Sport Huancayo	—	—	—	—	—	—	—	—	—	—	—	—	—	—	—	—	—	1–0	—
Sporting Cristal	—	—	—	—	—	—	—	—	—	—	—	—	—	—	—	—	—	—	—
Unión Comercio	—	—	—	—	—	—	—	—	—	—	—	—	—	—	—	—	—	1–0	—
Universidad César Vallejo	—	—	—	—	—	—	—	—	—	—	—	—	—	—	—	—	—	—	—
Universitario	3–1	—	1–2	2–1	—	4–0	—	3–0	1–0	—	—	1–0	—	—	2–0	—	4–0	—	—
UTC	—	—	—	—	—	—	—	—	—	—	—	—	—	—	—	—	—	1–0	—

Source: Liga 1, Soccerway
Legend: Blue = home team win; Yellow = draw; Red = away team win.

==== Clausura ====
Pos	Team	Pld	W	D	L	GF	GA	GD	Pts
2	Universitario	9	6	3	0	15	3	+12	21

Updated to match(es) played on 12 August 2023.

===== Results =====
Win Draw Loss

22 June 2023 1	Cienciano	1–1	Universitario	Cusco
	Garces 82'	Report	Perez Guedes 21'	Stadium: Garcilaso

4 July 2023 2	Universitario	2–0	Alianza Atlético	Lima
	Urruti 26'; Ureña 41'	Report		Stadium: Monumental

7 July 2023 3	Cantolao	1–4	Universitario	Lima
	Herrera (o.g.)	Report	Di Benedetto 24'; Saravia 40'; Valera 47'; Quispe 71'	Stadium: Nacional

14 July 2023 4	Universitario	2–0	Unión Comercio	Lima
	Herrera 37'; Rivera 60'	Report		Stadium: Monumental

22 July 2023 5	Alianza Lima	0–0	Universitario	Lima
		Report		Stadium: Alejandro Villanueva

31 July 2023 6	Universitario	3–0	Carlos Manucci	Lima
	Quispe 26'; Flores 33'; Urruti 89'	Report		Stadium: Monumental

6 August 2023 7	Melgar	0–1	Universitario	Arequipa
		Report	Valera 17'	Stadium: Monumental UNSA

12 August 2023 8	Universitario	1–0	Binacional	Lima
	Riveros 25'			Stadium: Monumental

16 August 2023 9	ADT	2–0	Universitario	Tarma
		Report		Stadium: Unión Tarma

19 August 2023 10	Universitario	1–1	Deportivo Garcilaso	Lima
	Quispe 46'	Report	Quevedo 45'	Stadium: Monumental

=== Copa Sudamericana ===
==== First stage ====
9 March 2023	Universitario (Peru)	2–0	(Peru) Cienciano	Estadio Monumental, Lima
21:00 UTC−5	Quispe 10'; Herrera 70'	Report		Attendance: 38,572; Referee: Gustavo Tejera (Uruguay)

==== Group stage ====
Pos	Team	Pld	W	D	L	GF	GA	GD	Pts	Qualification
2	Universitario	6	3	1	2	6	5	+1	10	Knockout round play-offs

5 April 2023 1	Gimnasia y Esgrima (Argentina)	0–1	(Peru) Universitario	Estadio Juan Carmelo Zerillo, La Plata
21:00 UTC−3		Report	Succar 85' (pen.)	Attendance: 13,193; Referee: Andrés Matonte (Uruguay)

20 April 2023 2	Universitario (Peru)	2–2	(Brazil) Goiás	Estadio Monumental, Lima
21:00 UTC−5	Riveros 87'; Valera 90+6'	Report	Morelli 57'; Maguinho 65'	Attendance: 47,132; Referee: Gery Vargas (Bolivia)

4 May 2023 3	Universitario (Peru)	2–0	(Colombia) Santa Fe	Estadio Monumental, Lima
21:00 UTC−5	Herrera 11'; Di Benedetto 66'	Report		Attendance: 48,391; Referee: Gustavo Tejera (Uruguay)

23 May 2023 4	Goiás (Brazil)	1–0	(Peru) Universitario	Estádio da Serrinha, Goiânia
19:00 UTC−3	Apodi 89'	Report		Attendance: 9,435; Referee: Guillermo Guerrero (Ecuador)

8 June 2023 5	Santa Fe (Colombia)	2–0	(Peru) Universitario	Estadio El Campín, Bogotá
21:00 UTC−5	Rodallega 27'; N. Moreno 78'	Report		Attendance: 9,863; Referee: Felipe González (Chile)

28 June 2023 6	Universitario (Peru)	1–0	(Argentina) Gimnasia y Esgrima	Estadio Monumental, Lima
21:00 UTC−5	Quispe 40'	Report		Attendance: 50,056; Referee: Esteban Ostojich (Uruguay)

==== Knockout round play-offs ====
11 July 2023 1st leg	Corinthians (Brazil)	1–0	(Peru) Universitario	Neo Química Arena, São Paulo
21:30 UTC−3	Felipe Augusto 79'	Report		Attendance: 36,807; Referee: Jesús Valenzuela (Venezuela)

18 July 2023 2nd leg	Universitario (Peru)	1–2	(Brazil) Corinthians	Estadio Monumental, Lima
19:30 UTC−5	Flores 77' (pen.)	Report	Maycon 70'; Ryan 90+2'	Attendance: 46,811; Referee: Wilmar Roldán (Colombia)

== Statistics ==
As of 6 August 2023

=== Goalscorers ===
Includes all competitive matches.

Rank	Pos.	Player	Liga 1	Copa Sudamericana	Total
1	FW	(Peru) Alex Valera	12	1	13
2	FW	(Argentina) Emanuel Herrera	6	2	8
3	FW	(Uruguay) Luis Urruti	7		7
4	MF	(Peru) Piero Quispe	3	2	5
5	MF	(Argentina) Martín Pérez Guedes	3		3

=== Assists ===
Includes all competitive matches.

No.	Pos.	Player	Liga 1	Copa Sudamericana	Total
1	FW	(Peru) Andy Polo	6	3	9
2	FW	(Uruguay) Luis Urruti	4		4
3	DF	(Peru) Nelson Cabanillas	3		3
4	DF	(Peru) José Bolivar	2	1	3

== Women’s football ==
=== Liga femenina ===
==== Regular stage ====
Pos	Team	Pld	W	D	L	GF	GA	GD	Pts	Qualification
1	Universitario	13	13	0	0	62	4	+58	39	Advance to Championship play-offs

Source: FPF

===== Results =====
Home \ Away	ALI	ATR	AYA	CAN	CAM	DEF	MUN	KIL	MEL	SCR	VIC	UCV	USM	UNI
Alianza Lima	—	—	—	—	—	—	—	—	—	—	—	—	—	—
Atlético Trujillo	—	—	—	—	—	—	—	—	—	—	—	—	—	—
Ayacucho	—	—	—	—	—	—	—	—	—	—	—	—	—	—
Cantolao	—	—	—	—	—	—	—	—	—	—	—		—	0–2
Carlos A. Mannucci	—	—	—	—	—	—	—	—	—	—	—	—	—	—
Defensores del Ilucán	—	—	—	—	—	—	—	—	—	—	—	—	—	0–7
Deportivo Municipal	—	—	—	—	—	—	—	—	—		—	—	—	—
Killas	—	—	—	—	—	—	—	—	—	—	—	—	—	—
Melgar	—	—	—	—	—	—	—	—	—	—	—	—	—	0–8
Sporting Cristal	—	—	—	—	—	—	—	—	—	—	—	—	—	0–1
Sporting Victoria	—	—	—	—	—	—	—	—	—	—	—	—	—	1–2
Universidad César Vallejo	—	—	—	—	—	—	—	—	—	—	—	—	—	1–5
Universidad San Martín	—	—	—	—	—	—	—	—	—	—	—	—	—	—
Universitario	1–0	10–0	7–0	—	3–1	—	3–1	3–0	—	—	—	—	10–0	—

Source: FPF, ADFP
Legend: Blue = home team win; Yellow = draw; Red = away team win.

==== Championship play-offs ====
Pos	Team	Pld	W	D	L	GF	GA	GD	Pts	Qualification
1	Universitario	5	4	0	1	13	4	+9	14	Advance to semi-finals

Source: FPF

===== Results =====
Win Draw Loss

1	Carlos Mannucci	0–1	Universitario	Trujillo
		Report		Stadium: Florencia de Mora

2	Universitario	2–0	Sporting Cristal	Lima
		Report		Stadium: Campo Mar

3	Universitario	3–0	Cantolao	Lima
		Report		Stadium: Campo Mar

4	Alianza Lima	4–1	Universitario	Lima
		Report		Stadium: Alejandro Villanueva

5	Universitario	6–0	Deportivo Municipal	Lima
		Report		Stadium: Campo Mar

==== Semi-finals ====
13 August 2023 1st leg	Sporting Cristal	1–4	Universitario	Lima
				Stadium: La Florida

20 August 2023 2nd leg	Universitario	3–0	Sporting Cristal	Lima
				Stadium: Monumental

==== Final ====
27 August 2023 1st leg	Alianza Lima	v	Universitario	Lima
				Stadium: Alejandro Villanueva

2 September 2023 2nd leg	Universitario	v	Alianza Lima	Lima
				Stadium: Monumental

== Under-20 team ==
=== Torneo de Promoción y Reserva ===
==== First stage ====
Pos	Team	Pld	W	D	L	GF	GA	GD	Pts	Qualification
1	Universitario	12	9	0	3	39	16	+23	27	Advance to the Playoffs
2	Sporting Cristal	10	8	1	1	34	5	+29	25	Advance to the Playoffs
3	Melgar	11	7	1	3	23	14	+9	22	Advance to the Playoffs

Updated to match(es) played on 9 August 2023. Source: Liga 1
Rules for classification: 1) Points; 2) Goal difference; 3) Goals for; 4) Fair play points; 5) Drawing of lots.

===== Results =====
1	Universitario	2–0	UCV	Lima
				Stadium: Campo Mar

2	UTC	1–8	Universitario	Cajamarca
				Stadium: Heroes de San Ramon

3	Universitario	4–0	Cusco fc	Lima
				Stadium: Campo Mar

4	Sport Huancayo	2–1	Universitario	Huancayo
				Stadium: Monumental de Jauja

5	Cienciano	3–4	Universitario	Cusco

6	Universitario	5–1	Alianza Lima	Lima
				Stadium: Campo Mar

7	Cantolao	0–2	Universitario	Lima
				Stadium: Adelfo Magallanes

8	Universitario	3–1	Union Comercio	Lima
				Stadium: Campo Mar

9	Alianza Lima	2–1	Universitario	Lima

10	Universitario	4–3	Carlos Manucci	Lima
				Stadium: Campo Mar

11	Melgar	3–1	Universitario	Arequipa

12	Universitario	4–0	Binacional	Lima
		Report		Stadium: Campo Mar

13	ADT	2–1	Universitario	Tarma

== Under-18 team ==
=== Copa Mitad del Mundo ===
This tournament organized by Independiente del Valle is intended to promote the development and competition of those young footballers who make up the youth ranks of South American clubs. Universitario de Deportes is one of the 16 participants.

==== Group stage ====
Win Draw Loss

1	Universitario (Peru)	0–1	(Brazil) Fluminense	Quito
		Report

2	Universitario (Peru)	0–0	(Uruguay) Montevideo City	Quito
		Report

3	Universitario (Peru)	0–0	(Ecuador) Independiente del Valle	Quito
		Report
