= Iluminados =

- Theatrical release poster
- Directed by: Ricardo Jhon
- Produced by: Ricardo Jhon; Jhonatan Díaz
- Cinematography: Jesús Núñez
- Edited by: Thony Bravo; Ugo Ávila
- Production company: Club Universitario de Deportes
- Distributed by: Club Universitario de Deportes
- Release dates: February 15, 2024 (Ticketmaster); February 24, 2024 (Peru)
- Running time: 77 minutes
- Country: Peru
- Language: Spanish

Iluminados (lit. 'Illuminated'), stylized as Il(U)minados, is a 2024 Peruvian documentary film co-produced and directed by Ricardo Jhon. It follows the events that happened before, during, and after the 2023 Liga 1 final between Universitario de Deportes and Alianza Lima, the two most emblematic and historical Peruvian clubs that faced for a national title after fourteen years.

The film was theatrically released nationwide on February 24, 2024. A sequel, Esta es la U, was released on December 12, 2024.

== Cast ==
- Jorge Fossati - manager
- José Carvallo - captain / goalkeeper
- Aldo Corzo - captain / right-back
- Williams Riveros - central defender
- Nelson Cabanillas - left-back
- Matías Di Benedetto - central defender
- Rodrigo Ureña - midfielder
- Piero Quispe - midfielder
- Martín Pérez Guedes - midfielder
- Horacio Calcaterra - midfielder
- Andy Polo - wingback
- Edison Flores - forward
- Alex Valera - forward
- Manuel Barreto - sports manager
- Jean Ferrari - administrator

== Release ==
Iluminados was released via streaming on Ticketmaster on February 15, 2024. The next day, it had an avant premiere on February 16, 2024, then it was commercially released on February 24, 2024, in Peruvian theaters. On May 1, 2024, the film was released for free in Universitario's YouTube channel.

=== Controversy ===
On February 27, 2024, during a screening of the film in a cinema in San Juan de Miraflores, a fan lit a flare that activated the security protocols by the cinema staff. Due to this dangerous action, the film was withdrawn from the national cinema chains and the distribution plans for the film in provinces were cancelled.

== Sequel ==
On November 13, 2024, after the two-time Universitario de Deportes championship in its Centennial year, a sequel titled Esta es la U (lit. 'This is the U') was announced, and narrated all events that occurred during its one hundred years of foundation. It was released on December 12, 2024, in Peruvian theaters.

== See also ==
- List of association football films
