= Pelé: Birth of a Legend =

- Production poster
- Directed by: Jeff Zimbalist; Michael Zimbalist
- Written by: Jeff Zimbalist; Michael Zimbalist
- Produced by: Brian Grazer; Ivan Orlic
- Starring: Kevin de Paula; Vincent D'Onofrio; Rodrigo Santoro; Diego Boneta; Colm Meaney
- Cinematography: Matthew Libatique
- Edited by: Glen Scantlebury; Naomi Geraghty; Luis Carballar
- Music by: A. R. Rahman
- Production companies: Imagine Entertainment; Seine Pictures; Legends 10
- Distributed by: IFC Films
- Release date: May 6, 2016 (United States)
- Running time: 107 minutes
- Country: United States
- Languages: English; Portuguese
- Box office: $2.3 million

Pelé: Birth of a Legend is a 2016 American biographical film about the early life of Brazilian footballer Pelé and his journey with Brazil to win the 1958 FIFA World Cup. The film was directed and written by Jeff Zimbalist and Michael Zimbalist, starring Kevin de Paula, Vincent D'Onofrio, Rodrigo Santoro, Diego Boneta, with Colm Meaney, and a cameo of Pelé himself. The film focuses on the relationship between the character Pelé and his father. Filming took place in Rio de Janeiro between September 2013 late 2014.

The film was released to a negative critical response, with film critics pointing out flaws in the narrative, criticising the lack of depth.

== Plot ==
During the 1950 FIFA World Cup, some Brazilians along with former footballer Dondinho are listening to the commentary of a football match on radio. Brazil loses that match and the World Cup, leaving everyone in tears. A slum kid Dico, the son of Dondinho, also witnesses that defeat over the radio and promises his father that one day, he will lead Brazil to win the FIFA World Cup title.

One day, Dico and his mother, Celeste Arantes, are cleaning a house that his mother was hired to clean. A group of boys, discussing an upcoming football tournament, enters the room and notices Dico as he tries to enter the conversation. He says he wants to be like Bilé (goalkeeper of CR Vasco da Gama), but he mispronounces the name as Pelé. All the boys poke fun at him and tease him with the name Pelé.

Dico later participates in that football tournament with the name Pelé, and with his spectacular Brazilian Ginga football style, his slum team made it all the way to the final, where they eventually lost 6-5. However, Dico scored 5 goals in the final and nearly masterminded a comeback on his own, shocking everyone watching and his teammates. All the spectators cheer him with the name Pelé, turning Dico into Pelé.

All believe Brazil lost the 1950 FIFA World Cup due to the Ginga football style, but Pelé plays for Santos FC with the iconic Ginga style and is selected for the 1958 World Cup Brazil team at the age of 16.

Under guidance from manager Vicente Feola, Pelé utilizes his street football skills to lead Brazil to the 1958 FIFA World Cup final. For the first time in history, Brazil wins the World Cup tournament after defeating the host country Sweden with a score of 5-2.

The epilogue reveals that Brazil also won their second (1962 FIFA World Cup) and third (1970 FIFA World Cup) FIFA title during the football era of Pelé. He broke numerous football records and is often recognised as the best player of the 20th century.

== Cast ==
- Kevin de Paula as Pelé
  - Leonardo Lima Carvalho as 10-year-old Pelé
- Seu Jorge as Dondinho, a former footballer and Pelé's father
- Mariana Nunes as Celeste Arantes, Pelé's mother
- Vincent D'Onofrio as Vicente Feola, the head coach of the Brazil national team at the 1958 World Cup
- Milton Gonçalves as Waldemar de Brito, a former footballer and scout who discovered Pelé during the latter's early footballing days
- Diego Boneta as José "Mazzola" Altafini, a Palmeiras footballer of Italian descent who bullied Pelé in his youth
- Colm Meaney as George Raynor, the head coach of the Sweden national team at the 1958 World Cup
- Felipe Simas as Garrincha
- Fernando Caruso as Zito
- Rodrigo Santoro as a Brazilian announcer
- Pelé in a guest appearance as a man sitting in the hotel lobby

== Production ==
The principal photography of the film began in Rio de Janeiro on September 30, 2013. On February 9, 2014, it was announced that the film would not release at the time of the 2014 FIFA World Cup, because it was in post-production and doing some re-shoots.

The film was shot entirely on location in Brazil, with Leonardo Carvalho and Kevin de Paula playing the rising star at the age of 9 and 17, respectively. Pelé stated: "The two young actors who play my younger self will be true stars, as their skills both on screen and on the football pitch proved." Zimbalist stated that they wanted to concentrate on Pelé's early life for dramatic reasons, giving the reason as: "It was the birth of the legend that parallels the birth of the Brazilian national identity, coming off the 1950 (World Cup) loss (to Uruguay) in Maracanã". The film is centered on the relationship between Pelé and his father.

== The Ginga Style ==
"Transpired from the Capoeira martial art style, ginga is what Brazilians are born with - a one-word collective of the way they move, walk, talk, feel and most importantly - play. It is the soul of Brazil, and one which had (and has) seemingly vanished from their football."

Pelé's football style derives from Ginga. As explained by the character De Brito: "It is primitive, but it has a long and rich history ... It all started at the beginning of the 16th century ... The Portuguese arrived in Brazil with African slaves. But the African's will was strong, and many escaped to the jungle. To protect themselves, the run away slaves called upon the ginga, the foundation of Capoeira, the martial art of war. When slavery was finally abolished, the capoeiraistas came out of the jungle, only to find that capoeira was outlawed throughout the land. They saw football to be the perfect way to practice ginga without being arrested. It was the ultimate form of ginga. And before long the ginga evolved, adapted, until it was no longer just ours, but all Brazilians. But at the 1950 World Cup, most believed our ginga style was to blame for the loss, and turned against anything associated with our African heritage. And just like your coach has been trying to remove ginga from your play, we have been trying to remove it from ourselves as a people ever since."

== Reception ==
The film received mostly negative reviews. Review aggregator Rotten Tomatoes gives the film a rating of 33%, based on 30 reviews, with an average rating of 5.04/10. On Metacritic, the film has a weighted average score of 39 out of 100, based on 11 critics, indicating "generally unfavorable reviews".

Critic Josh Terry of Deseret News said: "Overall, "Pelé: Birth of a Legend" is a solid sports film and a pleasant introduction to an international icon." However, he went on to add: "While "Birth of a Legend" touches on weighty subjects such as national identity and class tension, its tone often employs a frenetic highlight-reel style that gives its content more flash than depth." In his review for The Salt Lake Tribune, Sean P. Means awarded the film 2 out of 5 stars saying: "...the script plods along from event to event, and the young actors portraying Pelé are bland and uninvolving." Chief critic Alan Zilberman of The Washington Post concluded: "The film is too earnest and single-minded to be hagiographic, and the final moments are moving in spite of their predictable trajectories. ... the film would have benefitted if the Zimbalists had found a way to add a bit of depth — or even doubt — to the legend." Robert Abele of TheWrap stated the biopic "scores zero goals" calling the treatment to the script as "burnishing". In his review for The Village Voice, Michael Nordine expressed: "The new Pelé movie has great footwork but iffy, cheesy drama." Michael Rechtshaffen of The Los Angeles Times stated: "[. ... ] script fails to satisfy the dramatic requirements of a narrative feature." Andrew Barker of Variety commented: "The film is continually hamstrung by an uninspiring, ultra-traditionalist narrative."

José Altafini, who is portrayed as one of the antagonists of the film, initially commented that the film was "beautiful," although "a bit romanticised," but later criticised his portrayal in the film, and the fact that he was not consulted before filming. He also pointed out several historical inaccuracies in the film, noting that like Pelé, he came from a poor family – his father worked in a sugar factory, while his mother worked as a housemaid for a wealthy family – and that his hometown of Piracicaba was approximately 300km from Pelé's hometown of Bauru, and that it would not have been possible for them to meet as children, adding that they first met prior to leaving for the 1958 FIFA World Cup in Sweden, when he was 19 and Pelé was 17.

== Music ==
Pelé: Birth of a Legend (soundtrack)

Soundtrack album by A. R. Rahman
- Released: Scheduled for June 24, 2016
- Recorded: 2013–2015; Panchathan Record Inn and AM Studios, Chennai; Panchathan Hollywood Studios, Los Angeles
- Language: English
- Label: Sony Classical
- Producer: A. R. Rahman

A. R. Rahman chronology
Achcham Yenbadhu Madamaiyada / Sahasam Swasaga Sagipo (2016)	Pelé: Birth of a Legend (soundtrack) (2016)	Mohenjo Daro (2016)

The film score is composed by A. R. Rahman. In an interview with Press Trust of India, Rahman was quoted saying: "When I was approached for the project, I first Googled who Pelé was, because my life is all music. I saw amazing things about him and who he was. After that I read the script. I had tremendous respect for the project." In September 2014, Rahman recorded the tracks that featured singer Anna Beatriz. According to Rahman working on the Pelé project was intimidating but he found himself totally immersed in the Brazilian music, getting engaged in the character, in the lifestyle and setting of the movie. He added that sometime in his childhood, he had listened to a lot of Brazilian music. The score and a couple of songs in this movie fall into western music genre. On recording the score, Rahman stated that he used instruments like the charango, the mandolin, and a lot of percussion and brass instruments from Brazil. So, the soundtrack is a mix of many elements with universal music that reflects Brazilian culture.

"Ginga" was a promotional track released as a video. The song was not initially a part of the screenplay, but came organically as Rahman was intrigued by the word 'Ginga', which is a style of playing football. Rahman stated: "Ginga was one of the main things how Pelé won a match. I found the word very interesting." By the time he finished recording the score, Rahman played the track to the makers who approved it. In India, the song was launched at PVR Cinemas in Mumbai on May 9, 2016. At the event, Rahman elaborated on how YouTube videos and the existing Brazilian sounds helped him design the soundtrack and the theme for the movie.

=== Track listing ===
All music is composed by A. R. Rahman.

Pele (Original Motion Picture Soundtrack)
No.	Title	Performer(s)	Length
1.	"The Little Rascal"	Anna Beatriz
2.	"Reality"	George Doering
3.	"Father trains Pelé"	A. R. Rahman
4.	"Celeste's Theme"	Nikhita Gandhi
5.	"World Cup 1950"	Gaayatri Kaundinya
6.	"Dico Becomes Pelé"	Nikhita Gandhi
7.	"The Gift"	George Doering
8.	"Prodigy"	Sivamani
9.	"The Chase"	Sivamani
10.	"Thiago is Gone"	Linda Lind
11.	"Santos Dilemma"	A. R. Rahman
12.	"Locker Room"	A. R. Rahman
13.	"Hat trick"	A. R. Rahman
14.	"Return to Ginga"	Sivamani
15.	"No Looking Back"	George Doering
16.	"Conquering the Demons"	A. R. Rahman
17.	"Against All Odds"	Nikhita Gandhi, Arpita Gandhi
18.	"Blessings from the Sky"	Jonita Gandhi
19.	"The History of Ginga"	A. R. Rahman
20.	"Ginga"	A. R. Rahman, Anna Beatriz, Aditya Rao

== Accolades ==
For the 89th Academy Awards, A. R. Rahman was shortlisted for nomination under Academy Award for Best Original Score among 145 candidates and the song "Ginga" produced by A. R. Rahman and performed by A. R. Rahman, Anna Beatriz and Aditya Rao has found its place among 91 contenders under Academy Award for Best Original Song. The song didn't make the final list nominations announced on January 24, 2017, at Samuel Goldwyn Theater.

== See also ==
- Pele Eterno
- Brazil 70: The Third Star (Netflix miniseries)
- List of association football films
