= Weaponology =

- Genre: Documentary; Technology; Military; War; History
- Created by: Hereward Pelling
- Narrated by: John Schwab
- Country of origin: United States
- Original language: English
- No. of seasons: 2
- No. of episodes: 26 (list of episodes)

Production
- Running time: 60 minutes (with commercials)

Original release
- Network: Discovery Channel; AHC
- Release: January 15, 2007 – February 24, 2008

Weaponology is a documentary television series that premiered on November 6, 2007, on the Discovery Channel. The program also airs on the Military Channel (now American Heroes Channel). The documentary series was narrated by John Schwab.

== Production ==
To depict the advancement of weaponry, the show combined graphics and staged scenes. A seven-member crew of designers based out of Flashback Television's London studio took four weeks per episode to create the graphics. Flashback's managing director, Taylor Downing, was the executive producer of the show. Hereward Pelling was the show's series producer, while Rachel Naughton was the line producer. The show's second season consisted of 13 episodes with a running time of 60 minutes each. Stuart Rose, Steve Baker and Jim Greayer served as directors of the episodes.

== Reception ==
Tim Goodman of the San Francisco Chronicle wrote that Weaponology "reminded me—starkly—that I really need to go 'around the horn' more often to discover what's on". Jasmin Orr of The Courier-Mail called the show's second-season premiere "a tad disturbing" when firearms experts and historians express excitement about the sniper rifle Accuracy International AS50's lethal capabilities. In a negative review, The Age television critic Brad Newsome said the show had "many layers of inanity" including "fatuous narration", "ill-conceived, computer-generated 3D 'family tree' of sniping that whirls around confusingly in between segments", and "censorship of death itself".

== Episode list ==
The first season of the show primarily covers the history of weapons, including tanks and sniper rifles. The second season focuses on special operations groups, such as the Russian Spetsnaz American Green Berets, and the British Special Air Service, or combat engineers.

=== Season 1: Weapons (2007) ===
No. overall	No. in season	Title	Directed by	Original release date
1	1	"Sniper Rifles"	Mat Hodgson	January 15, 2007
2	2	"Body Armor"	Mat Hodgson	January 22, 2007
3	3	"Rapid Fire"	Jim Greayer	January 29, 2007
4	4	"Submarines"	Stuart Rose	February 5, 2007
5	5	"Vertical Take Off"	Nick Gillam Smith	February 12, 2007
6	6	"Bombers"	Jim Greayer	February 19, 2007
7	7	"Fighter"	Stephanie	February 26, 2007
8	8	"Artillery"	Stuart Rose	March 5, 2007
9	9	"Booby Traps"	Stuart Rose	March 12, 2007
10	10	"Frags, Pineapples and RPG's"	Hereward Pelling	March 19, 2007
11	11	"Fire Weapons"	Jim Greayer	March 26, 2007
12	12	"Armoured Personnel Carriers"	Hereward Pelling	April 2, 2007
13	13	"Tanks"	Jim Greayer	April 9, 2007

=== Season 2: Elite Units (2007–2008) ===
No. overall	No. in season	Title	Directed by	Original release date
14	1	"US Navy SEALs"	Stuart Rose	November 20, 2007
15	2	"US Marine Corps"	Stuart Rose	November 27, 2007
16	3	"Waffen-SS"	Steve Baker	December 4, 2007
17	4	"US Army Airborne"	Steve Baker	December 11, 2007
18	5	"US Army Rangers"	Jim Greayer	December 18, 2007
19	6	"Green Berets"	Jim Greayer	January 6, 2008
20	7	"SAS"	Mat Hodgson	January 13, 2008
21	8	"Royal Marines"	Mat Hodgson	January 20, 2008
22	9	"Extreme Warriors"	Claire Titley	January 27, 2008
23	10	"Combat Engineers"	Claire Titley	February 3, 2008
24	11	"French Foreign Legion"	Stuart Rose	February 10, 2008
25	12	"Spetsnaz"	Steve Baker	February 17, 2008
26	13	"Israeli Commandos"	Jim Greayer	February 24, 2008

== See also ==
- FutureWeapons is another similar TV show broadcast on the Discovery Channel and the Military Channel.
