= Diego Romero (footballer, born 2001) =

Peruvian footballer (born 2001)

Personal information
- Full name: Diego Alonso Romero Cachay
- Date of birth: 17 August 2001 (age 25)
- Place of birth: Chiclayo, Peru
- Height: 1.88 m (6 ft 2 in)
- Position: Goalkeeper

Team information
- Current team: Universitario de Deportes
- Number: 1

Youth career
- –2019: Universitario de Deportes

Senior career*
Years	Team	Apps	(Gls)
2019–	Universitario de Deportes	52	(0)
2025	→ Banfield (loan)	0	(0)

International career^{‡}
2019	Peru U20	0	(0)
2024	Peru U23	4	(0)
2026–	Peru	1	(0)
- * Club domestic league appearances and goals as of 21:14, 19 September 2026 (UTC) ‡ National team caps and goals as of 22:23, 3 October 2026

Diego Alonso Romero Cachay (born 17 August 2001) is a Peruvian footballer who plays as a goalkeeper for Universitario de Deportes and the Peru national team.

== Club career ==
Romero came from the youth ranks of Universitario de Deportes, being promoted to the team's reserves in 2018. In 2019, he was promoted to the first team by manager Nicolás Córdova.

In 2020, after the arrival of manager Gregorio Pérez, Romero was given the third goalkeeper spot in the squad, behind José Carvallo and Aamet Calderón. As well, during the first matches of the year, he captained the club's reserves. Later in the year, after the arrival of manager Ángel Comizzo and an injury to Calderón, Romero was given the second goalkeeper spot. Following Carvallo's call-up to the national team, he made his professional debut on matchday 15 in a 5–0 victory against Deportivo Municipal. After having a good performance in his debut, Romero had his contract renewed until December 2024. On matchday 5 of the Fase 2, Universitario lost 6–1 against Universidad Técnica de Cajamarca, with him being one of the most criticized players after the match. Romero played a total of 7 matches in that season, conceding 14 goals.

In 2021, after the arrival of Patrick Zubczuk, he returned to the third goalkeeper spot. Due to Carvallo being once more called up to the national team and following an injury to Zubczuk, Romero was a starter in a match against César Vallejo, where he assisted one of Alex Valera's goals. In 2022, he played his first match of the season in a 1–0 defeat against Deportivo Binacional. Romero played a total of 5 matches that year. The next season, he won his first trophy after Universitario defeated Alianza Lima in the 2023 Liga 1 finals. In 2024, he received a loan offer from Independiente Rivadavia, but was convinced by club administrator Jean Ferrari and manager Fabián Bustos to stay at Universitario. Romero played 7 matches that season, in which the team won a second consecutive national championship.

== International career ==
Romero was called to the Peru U-20 national team for the 2019 South American U-20 Championship. He was then called to the U-23 national team for the 2024 CONMEBOL Pre-Olympic Tournament, where he played the 4 group stage matches. That same year, he was called to the senior team for the 2024 Copa América.

On 3 October 2026, Romero made his senior international debut for Peru in a friendly against Canada.

== Career statistics ==
=== Club ===
As of match played 1 April 2025

Appearances and goals by club, season and competition
Club	Season	League			Cup		Continental		Total	
Club	Season	Division	Apps	Goals	Apps	Goals	Apps	Goals	Apps	Goals
Universitario de Deportes	2020	Peruvian Liga 1	7	0	—		—		7	0
Universitario de Deportes	2021	Peruvian Liga 1	1	0	—		—		1	0
Universitario de Deportes	2022	Peruvian Liga 1	5	0	—		—		5	0
Universitario de Deportes	2023	Peruvian Liga 1	8	0	—		2	0	10	0
Universitario de Deportes	2024	Peruvian Liga 1	7	0	—		0	0	7	0
Universitario de Deportes	Total		28	0	—		2	0	30	0
Banfield (loan)	2025	Argentine Primera División	0	0	1	0	—		1	0
Career total			28	0	1	0	2	0	31	0

=== International ===
As of match played 3 October 2026

Appearances and goals by national team and year
National team	Year	Apps	Goals
Peru	2026	1	0
Total		1	0

== Honours ==
=== Club ===
Universitario de Deportes

- Peruvian Primera División: 2023
- Peruvian Primera División: 2024
