= Nelson Cabanillas =

Peruvian footballer (born 2000)

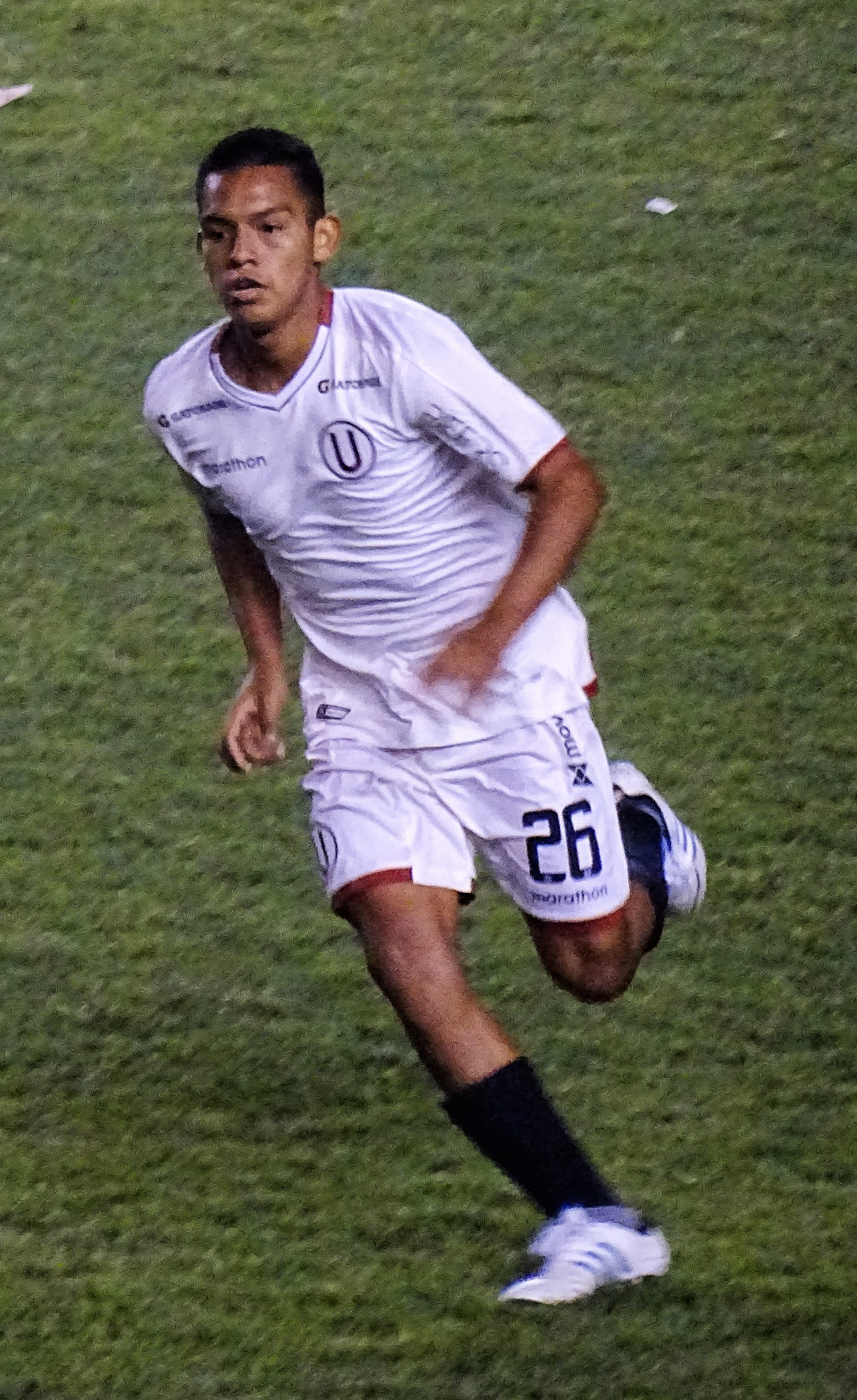
- Cabanillas at the 2018 Noche Crema

Personal information
- Full name: Nelson Jhonny Luis Cabanillas Jesús
- Date of birth: 8 February 2000 (age 26)
- Place of birth: Comas, Lima, Perú
- Height: 1.70 m (5 ft 7 in)
- Positions: Left-back; left wing-back

Team information
- Current team: FBC Melgar
- Number: 27

Youth career
- 2017–2018: Universitario de Deportes
- 2018: San Luis de Quillota

Senior career*
Years	Team	Apps	(Gls)
2018–2019	San Luis de Quillota	0	(0)
2019	→ Universitario de Deportes (loan)	11	(0)
2020–2024	Universitario de Deportes	105	(1)
2025–	FBC Melgar	19	(0)

International career^{‡}
2017	Perú U17	2	(0)
- * Club domestic league appearances and goals as of 30 December 2025 ‡ National team caps and goals as of 8 November 2023

Nelson Jhonny Luis Cabanillas Jesús (born 8 February 2000) is a Peruvian footballer who plays as a left-back or left wing-back for Peruvian Liga 1 club FBC Melgar.

== Club career ==
Cabanillas played in the youth ranks of Universitario de Deportes since August 2017. In early 2018, he was one of the players that manager Pedro Troglio wanted to promote to the first team of Universitario; however, this was not allowed by the Peruvian Football Federation due to a sanction that forbade Universitario from signing or renovating football contracts.

After being unable to sign a professional contract with Universitario, Cabanillas emigrated to Chile to play in the reserve team of San Luis de Quillota. After performing well in San Luis' U19 team, he signed his first professional contract for three years.

=== Universitario de Deportes ===
In January 2019, he was officially announced as a new signing of Universitario de Deportes, arriving on loan for one season. Cabanillas made his debut in matchday 10 of the Liga 1, in a 4–0 victory against Sport Boys, where he forced an own goal to put Universitario up 1–0. At the end of the season, he was fully transferred to Universitario and signed a contract for two years. Despite this, Cabanillas did not play regularly in the 2020 season and only appeared in 3 matches. He began the 2021 season in the trust of manager Ángel Comizzo; however, a bad run of form saw him losing space in the starting XI. At the start of the year, Cabanillas played as a left-winger, but after a serious injury to Iván Santillán he began to be played as an emergency left-back. In matchday 7 of the Fase 2, he scored his first professional goal in a 1–2 defeat in the Peruvian Clásico. Cabanillas ended up having a good season, earning a place in the starting XI that was reaffirmed with the arrival of manager Gregorio Pérez. At the end of the year, he renewed his contract with la U for three more seasons.

Cabanillas played in the second qualifying stage of the 2022 Copa Libertadores with Universitario against Barcelona de Guayaquil, but the team ended up losing both home and away matches and was eliminated from the tournament. The following season, after the arrival of manager Jorge Fossati, Cabanillas began playing as a left wing-back. He also played in the 2023 Copa Sudamericana, standing out in Universitario's group stage match against Gimnasia de la Plata, but being expelled in a match of the same stage against Santa Fe. During the second half of the season, injuries and weight gain meant that Cabanillas' spot in the starting XI was taken by José Bolivar for several matches. A the end of the year, he won the national title with his club after defeating Alianza Lima 3–1 on aggregate in the finals. The next year, Cabanillas would alternate the left flank with Ecuadorian Segundo Portocarrero and, in November, he won a second consecutive national championship. On 25 November, Universitario announced that he would not continue playing with the team after the end of his contract at the end of the year. In December, FBC Melgar announced the signing of Cabanillas for the 2025 season.

== International career ==
Cabanillas was part of the Peruvian U17 national team which played the 2017 South American U-17 Championship in Chile.

== Career statistics ==
As of 11 November 2024

Club Statistics
Club	Season	League			Cup		Continental		Total	
Club	Season	Division	Apps	Goals	Apps	Goals	Apps	Goals	Apps	Goals
San Luis de Quillota	2018	Campeonato Nacional de Chile	0	0	0	0	0	0	0	0
Universitario de Deportes	2019	Peruvian Liga 1	11	0	2	0	0	0	13	0
Universitario de Deportes	2020	Peruvian Liga 1	3	0	0	0	0	0	3	0
Universitario de Deportes	2021	Peruvian Liga 1	21	1	1	0	0	0	22	1
Universitario de Deportes	2022	Peruvian Liga 1	27	0	0	0	2	0	29	0
Universitario de Deportes	2023	Peruvian Liga 1	28	0	0	0	8	0	36	0
Universitario de Deportes	2024	Peruvian Liga 1	27	0	0	0	3	0	30	0
Universitario de Deportes	Total		117	1	3	0	13	0	133	1
Career total			117	1	3	0	13	0	133	1

== Honours ==
=== Club ===
Universitario de Deportes

- Peruvian Primera División: 2023, 2024
