= List of association football films =

The following is a list of films featuring association football.

== List ==
Year	Title	Genre	Notes
1911	Harry the Footballer	Drama	Silent film about a star player being kidnapped by the opposition. However, they are foiled by his girl-friend, just in time for him to get to the match and score the winning goal.
1920	The Winning Goal	Drama	Silent film about a fictional team called the Blackton Rovers.
1930	The Great Game	Comedy	British film about fictional Manningford F.C.
1936	Sportszerelem	Comedy	
1939	The Arsenal Stadium Mystery	Crime comedy	When a player is poisoned during a match, Detective Inspector Slade must investigate.
1942	Das große Spiel	Comedy	
1947	O Leão da Estrela	Comedy-drama	This Arthur Duarte movie includes original images of the Portuguese cup final Porto – Sporting
1953	The Great Game	Comedy-drama	The chairman of a British club is penalized for approaching a player from a rival team.
1955	The Love Match	Comedy	Arthur Askey stars as a football mad train driver, with Thora Hird as his wife who takes in a referee as a lodger.
1961	Két félidő a pokolban	Drama	Based on 1942's The Death Match between team in modern-day Ukraine (including players from Dynamo Kyiv) and a German Wehrmacht side.
1962	Garrincha: Hero of the Jungle	Documentary	Brazilian film on the career of then-current superstar Garrincha.
1962	Третий тайм (The Third Half)	Drama	Also based on 1942's The Death Match
1970	Fútbol México 70	Documentary	The 1970 FIFA World Cup held in Mexico.
1971	Dhanyee Meye	Comedy	
1975	Pirveli mertskhali	Comedy-drama	Passionate and talented sportsman Jason founded the first ever Georgian football team in the seaport of Poti
1976	Mohunbaganer Meye		
1979	Yesterday's Hero	Drama	Ian McShane as a former football player turned alcoholic.
1979	Coup de tête	Comedy/Drama	French film about player kicked off the team for fighting with the star.
1979	El Chanfle	Comedy	Chespirito as a waterboy for a Mexican team whose life unexpectedly changes when his wife gets pregnant.
1979	La Fiesta de Todos	Documentary	The 1978 FIFA World Cup held in Argentina.
1981	Escape to Victory	War	Loosely based on The Death Match, with Sylvester Stallone and Michael Caine; released in North America as Victory.
1981	Gregory's Girl	Comedy	Scottish teen tale directed by Bill Forsyth.
1982	A Captain's Tale	Drama/documentary	Film made for TV, about an "international" tournament (mainly 1909) in which West Auckland town somehow get invited to take part.
1983	Those Glory Glory Days	Drama	A group of girls growing up in 1960–61 London develop an interest in football and Tottenham Hotspur.
1983	The Champions	Comedy	Lee Tung (Yuen Biao) gets taunted by rival football teams.
1986	Hotshot	Drama	An American football player leaves his rich family and goes to Brazil to learn from a master, portrayed by Pele.
1988	Piłkarski poker	Comedy-drama	Polish film about the corruption in football environment directed by Janusz Zaorski.
1991	Ultra	Drama	Italian film.
1991	Cup Final	Drama	Israeli film about a kidnapping during the 1982 FIFA World Cup.
1992	Ladybugs	Comedy	Rodney Dangerfield as a soccer coach who makes a boy suit up as a girl.
1994	An Impossible Job	Documentary	
1995	The Big Green	Family Comedy	A British woman teaches soccer to Texas school kids.
1995	The Final Goal	Drama	An Idealistic pro soccer player is pressured to throw the biggest game of his life.
1995	I.D.	Drama	Four police officers go undercover to investigate thugs on East London soccer team.
1996	When Saturday Comes	Drama	A factory worker (Sean Bean) is recruited by professional football clubs.
1997	Didier	Comedy	Didier, a dog, is transformed into a human. A football agent uses him to replace injured players in a very important match.
1997	Fever Pitch	Romantic comedy	Colin Firth in an adaptation of Nick Hornby's book about Arsenal.
1999	The Cup	Comedy	Buddhist monks in a remote Himalayan monastery try to obtain a television for the monastery to watch the 1998 World Cup final.
1999	Soccer Dog: The Movie	Family comedy	An orphan's dog has an uncanny skill at soccer.
1999	Home Team	Family comedy	Ex-pro football player (Steve Guttenberg) is sentenced to serve as a handyman at a boys' home.
1999	Switching Goals	Family comedy	Twin sisters (Olsen twins), total opposites, become soccer opponents.
2000	Air Bud: World Pup	Family comedy	Direct-to-video film in the Air Bud series.
2000	The Goalkeeper	Drama	The plot follows the mishaps of Ramiro Forteza, a goalie arriving to an Asturian village in 1948, coming to acquaint both with the Guardia Civil and the Maquis
2000	There's Only One Jimmy Grimble	Comedy-drama	A 15-year-old's goal is to play for Manchester City.
2001	Shaolin Soccer	Comedy	Hong Kong comedy about a football-playing monk.
2001	A Shot at Glory	Drama	A coach (Robert Duvall) tries to get his team to the Scottish Cup final.
2001	Mean Machine	Comedy-drama	Adaptation of The Longest Yard with association football instead of American football. Stars former footballer Vinnie Jones.
2001	Mike Bassett: England Manager	Comedy	Manager from lower leagues becomes manager of England national football team, aims for World Cup in Brazil.
2002	The Game of Their Lives	Documentary	Chronicles North Korea national team that made surprising run to quarterfinals of 1966 FIFA World Cup.
2002	Bend It Like Beckham	Comedy-drama	Two teenaged girls in England (Parminder Nagra and Keira Knightley) try out for football.
2003	Garrincha: Lonely Star	Documentary	Brazilian documentary examining the spectacular playing career and troubled off-field life of Garrincha, coinciding with the 70th anniversary of his birth and 20th of his death.
2003	Just for Kicks	Comedy	Story of soccer-playing twin brothers (Dylan and Cole Sprouse).
2003	The Miracle of Bern	Drama	Set against backdrop of 1954 FIFA World Cup Final, which became known in Germany as the "Miracle of Bern".
2003	The Other Final	Documentary	Match between Bhutan and Montserrat, lowest-ranked teams in FIFA World Rankings, held on same day as 2002 FIFA World Cup Final.
2003	United	Romantic comedy	Norway film.
2004	The Football Factory	Drama	Drama film about football hooliganism in England, loosely based on the novel of the same name by John King.
2004	Pelé Eterno	Documentary	
2004	Soccer Dog: European Cup	Comedy	Sequel to 1999 children's film.
2004	Guys and Balls	Comedy	A gay goalkeeper assembles a gay-only soccer team to play against his ex-team, which fired him due to homophobia.
2005	Dare to Dream: The Story of the U.S. Women's Soccer Team	Documentary	A history of the US women's national team.
2005	Goal!	Drama	Santiago Muñez (Kuno Becker), a Mexican youth in U.S. illegally, gets an opportunity to play in England.
2005	Green Street	Drama	Starring Elijah Wood and Charlie Hunnam. A film about football hooliganism in England.
2005	Kicking & Screaming	Family comedy	Will Ferrell screwball comedy about coaching soccer.
2005	Real, The Movie	Documentary	Explores history of Real Madrid, incorporating some fictional elements.
2005	The Game of Their Lives	Drama	Based on USA's massive upset of England in the 1950 FIFA World Cup.
2005	Merry Christmas aka Joyeux Noël	Drama	During World War I, soldiers put aside differences to play a game of soccer.
2005	Garpastum	Drama	Two brothers in 1914 on the eve of the outbreak of World War I wish to build a football stadium.
2006	Goal II: Living the Dream	Drama	Continuation of 2005 story, with Santiago switching from Newcastle to Real Madrid.
2006	Offside	Comedy	Sweden film.
2006	Offside	Drama	Iranian film about girls trying to see Iran's qualifier against Bahrain.
2006	Once in a Lifetime: The Extraordinary Story of the New York Cosmos	Documentary	Matt Dillon narrates story of North American Soccer League club, with player interviews.
2006	La Gran final	Drama	Three groups of people from remote areas around the world attempt to watch the 2002 World Cup Final.
2006	Zidane: A 21st Century Portrait	Documentary	Chronicles life and career of Zinedine Zidane.
2006	She's the Man	Comedy	Based on William Shakespeare’s Twelfth Night, Amanda Bynes disguises herself as her brother so she can play on the men’s soccer team.
2006	Sixty Six	Comedy/Drama	The misadventures surrounding a London boy's bar mitzvah that conflicts with the 1966 FIFA World Cup final. Based on the real-life bar mitzvah of the film's director Paul Weiland, which took place on that specific day.
2007	Gracie	Drama	New Jersey girl battles to play on boys' team. Loosely based on Elisabeth Shue, who co-produced film and plays girl's mother.
2007	Dhan Dhana Dhan Goal	Drama	
2007	Her Best Move	Comedy	A 15-year-old girl has a shot to make the US national team.
2008	Maradona by Kusturica	Documentary	A look at the career of Diego Maradona.
2008	Kicking It	Documentary	Colin Farrell narrates a look at the Homeless World Cup.
2008	Soccer Mom	Comedy	TV family movie starring Missi Pyle.
2009	Football with a Cause	Documentary	Académica Coimbra team resistance against Portuguese dictatorship, shown to world in cup final against Benfica in 1969
2009	The Damned United	Drama	A fictionalized version of Brian Clough's tenure as manager of Leeds United.
2009	Goal! 3: Taking on the World	Drama	Direct-to-video third part of trilogy following the experiences of a Mexican footballer in Europe.
2009	Offside	Romantic comedy	Story about rival footballers in Australia.
2009	A Time for Champions	Documentary	Made for TV. Explores history of soccer in St. Louis, focusing on Saint Louis University in the 1960s and early 1970s.
2009	Looking for Eric	Fiction	Eric Bishop is a football fanatic postman whose life is descending into crisis. When he gets high his idol Eric Cantona appears to him and offers him advice.
2010	One Night in Turin	Documentary	Chronicles England's run in the 1990 FIFA World Cup.
2010	Tim Cahill: The Unseen Journey	Documentary	Australian made-for-TV film following Socceroos star Tim Cahill during the run-up to the team's appearance in the 2010 FIFA World Cup.
2010	The Referee	Documentary	Film about Swedish soccer referee Martin Hansson and his dramatic journey to 2010 FIFA World Cup in South Africa.
2010	The Two Escobars	Documentary	Made for TV as part of ESPN's 30 for 30 series. Explores lives of footballer Andrés Escobar and drug lord Pablo Escobar, and links between murders of both men.
2011	For the Glory	Drama	
2011	Egaro	Drama	Indian Bengali team Mohun Bagan wins 1911 IFA Shield against mighty British team East Yorkshire Regiment in Calcutta under background circumstances of Partition of Bengal of 1905.
2011	The Four Year Plan	Documentary	Chronicles the 2007 takeover of nearly bankrupt Queens Park Rangers by a group of billionaires and their attempt to get the club promoted to the Premier League by 2011.
2011	The Last Proletarians of Football	Documentary	Swedish film exploring the 1980s "golden age" of IFK Göteborg amid the backdrop of significant changes to Swedish society.
2011	Lucky Trouble	Comedy	A school teacher is mistaken for a football coach and ends up training a group of juvenile delinquents for the Russian Youth Soccer Cup.
2011	Will	Drama	After losing his parents, 12-year-old journeys across Europe to witness 2005 UEFA Champions League Final, which features dad's favorite football club Liverpool.
2011	United	Drama	Based on the true story of the Munich air disaster which claimed 23 lives including lives of eight Manchester United players. In the aftermath of the disaster a makeshift United team reached the 1958 FA Cup Final against all odds.
2011	Abby Head On	Documentary	ESPN Film about soccer phenom Abby Wambach
2012	Playing for Keeps	Romantic comedy	A former professional star (Gerard Butler) coaches a kids' team.
2013	Metegol	Comedy	Argentine computer-animated film about a man who plays football who tried to protect a whole town with his help with his foosball players to play real soccer.
2013	The Other Sport	Documentary	3-part TV series about the history and developments inside women's soccer in Sweden.
2013	The Class of '92	Documentary	Chronicles the rise of six young Manchester United players—David Beckham, Nicky Butt, Ryan Giggs, Gary Neville, Phil Neville, and Paul Scholes—from the club's 1992 FA Youth Cup win, featuring four of the group, to United's Treble victory in 1999.
2013	The 99ers	Documentary	Made for TV as part of ESPN's Nine for IX series. An insider account of the 1999 US World Cup soccer team that broke new ground for women's sports
2013	The Whistle	Documentary	Winner of the Sundance Film Festival's Grand Jury Prize for Short Film, The Whistle is a documentary about a soccer referee who has reached a critical crossroads in his life
2014	Eighteam	Documentary	Spanish–Zambian co-production. Explores the recent history of the Zambia national team—from promise in the late 1980s, to unspeakable tragedy in 1993, resurrection in 1994, and ultimate victory in 2012.
2014	Hillsborough	Documentary	Made for TV as an ESPN–BBC co-production. A 25-year retrospective of the Hillsborough disaster, featuring many accounts from fans in attendance, police officers, and victims' family members. First aired in the U.S. as part of the 30 for 30 series in 2014; first aired in the UK in 2016.
2014	Messi	Documentary	Spanish film exploring the rise of Argentine superstar Lionel Messi.
2014	Next Goal Wins	Documentary	British film about American Samoa team trying to qualify for World Cup.
2014	United Passions	Drama	French film about origins of FIFA.
2014	White, Blue and White	Documentary	Made for TV as part of ESPN's 30 for 30 series. After victory in the 1978 World Cup, Argentines Ossie Ardiles and Ricky Villa become cult heroes at Tottenham Hotspur, but later find themselves torn by the impending conflict between Argentina and Britain.
2014	The Opposition	Documentary	Made for TV as part of ESPN's 30 for 30 Soccer Stories Series. Chile hosts a World Cup qualifier in a stadium that only months earlier had been used as a concentration camp
2014	Maradona '86	Documentary	Made for TV as part of ESPN's 30 for 30 Soccer Stories Series. In the 1986 FIFA World Cup, Diego Maradona redefined what is possible for one man to accomplish on the soccer field.
2014	Ceasefire Massacre	Documentary	Made for TV as part of ESPN's 30 for 30 Soccer Stories Series. On 18 June 1994, as the Republic of Ireland World Cup team played in New Jersey, six fans were gunned down 24 miles south of Belfast.
2014	The Myth of Garrincha	Documentary	Made for TV as part of ESPN's 30 for 30 Soccer Stories Series. A profile of Brazilian association football icon Mané Garrincha.
2014	Mysteries of the Rimet Trophy	Documentary	Made for TV as part of ESPN's 30 for 30 Soccer Stories Series. The Jules Rimet Trophy, the holy grail of sport trophies, was the target of numerous thefts and ultimately disappeared without a trace
2014	Barbosa: The Man Who Made Brazil Cry	Documentary	Made for TV as part of ESPN's 30 for 30 Soccer Stories Series. A look at Brazilian goalkeeper Moacir Barbosa Nascimento and how a costly mistake in the 1950 FIFA World Cup which cost Brazil the title and impacted his countrymen
2015	Boca Juniors 3D	Documentary	Argentinian film exploring the history of Boca Juniors.
2015	Ronaldo	Documentary	Filmmaker Anthony Wonke examines the life and career of famed soccer player Cristiano Ronaldo.
2016	Pelé: Birth of a Legend		Film that examines the life and career of Pelé.
2016	Becoming Zlatan	Documentary	Swedish film that explores the early life and football development of Zlatan Ibrahimović, leading up to his international breakthrough in 2005 with Juventus.
2016	Ola Bola	Comedy/Drama	Malaysia first sport football film exploring the real story about Malaysia during qualifying to 1980 Summer Olympics.
2016	Bo66y	Documentary	A film which marks the 50th anniversary of England's victory in the 1966 World Cup.
2017	George Best: All By Himself	Documentary	Made for TV as part of ESPN's 30 for 30 series. George Best was one of the most naturally gifted footballers ever, lifting Manchester United to new prominence a decade after its unspeakable tragedy—but alcoholism ended his football career while he was still in his twenties.
2018	Early Man	Comedy	British stop-motion film following Dug and his Stone Age tribe who must beat Lord Nooth's Bronze Age team at football to reclaim their land.
2018	The Bromley Boys	Comedy	British film about a boy from Bromley who wants to become a football manager, and becomes a football manager.
2018	Diamantino	Comedy-drama	The film follows premier association football star Diamantino after he loses his special touch and ends his career in disgrace.
2018	Trautmann (The Keeper)	Drama	The film tells the story of Bert Trautmann, a German prisoner of war who became a football legend in England.
2019	Kolej Havası	Documentary	Turkish film about the story of the Beşiktaş football team, nicknamed the College Team, which won championships between 1989 and 1992.
2020	Ultras	Drama	
2021	King Otto	Documentary	Greek film about how German manager Otto Rehhagel took a Greece national team that had never before won a match in a major international tournament to Euro 2004 glory.
2021	The United Way	Documentary	The film tells the story of Manchester United from the Busby Babes era to the 1999 Champions League final, including Eric Cantona's Manchester United career.
2022	The Soccer Football Movie	Animation	Animated film featuring Zlatan Ibrahimovic and Megan Rapinoe where their footballing abilities are stolen by an evil scientist.
2023	City of Dreams	Drama	Young Mexican association football player is trafficked into the United States.
2023	Dream	Comedy-drama	South Korean film about a football player an his job as new coach of the national football team of homeless people.
2023	Forever	Drama	Swedish coming-of-age sports drama about two teenage footballers, whose friendship is tested by the arrival of a demanding new coach.
2023	Next Goal Wins	Comedy-drama	Feature film based on the 2014 documentary
2024	The Beautiful Game	Drama	Film about a squad of English homeless footballers who are led by their coach Mal, to compete in Rome at the global annual football tournament, the Homeless World Cup.
2024	Iluminados	Documentary	Peruvian film that explores the 2023 Liga 1 final between classic rivals Universitario de Deportes and Alianza Lima, ending with the victory of the former for the third time.
2024	#SeAcabó: Diario de las campeonas	Documentary	Netflix Spain production recounting the Spain women's national team's run to the 2023 World Cup crown and the controversy that followed the win.
2024	U.S. Palmese	Comedy	A star footballer is transferred from Paris Saint-Germain FC to US Palmese in Calabria, Italy.
2025	Berlusconi: Condemned to Win	Documentary	Three-part entry in ESPN's 30 for 30 series, exploring how Silvio Berlusconi's ownership of AC Milan helped propel him to three stints as Italy's prime minister, raising questions of the relationship between sports and politics.
2026	México 86	Comedy-drama	A satirical film that chronicles the behind-the-scenes political and clandestine deals to bring the 1986 World Cup to Mexico.

== Highest grossing association football films ==
The following is a list of association football films that surpassed $1 million.

2001 is the most frequent year with three entries on the list, while 42% of the films were released after 2000.

Goal! is the most frequent franchise with two.

Highest grossing association football films
Rank	Film	Box office	Year	Ref.
1	Bend It Like Beckham	$92,247,634	2002	
2	She's the Man	$57,194,667	2006	
3	Kicking & Screaming	$56,070,433	2005	
4	Early Man	$54,629,139	2018	
5	Shaolin Soccer	$42,776,760	2001	
6	The Unbeatables	$32,768,940	2013	
7	Playing for Keeps	$30,962,335	2012	
8	Goal! The Dream Begins	$27,610,873	2005	
9	Escape to Victory	$27,453,000	1981	
10	Next Goal Wins	$18,648,802	2023	
11	Joyeux Noël	$17,709,155	2005	
12	The Big Green	$17,736,619	1995	
13	Looking for Eric	$11,650,726	2009	
14	Ladybugs	$14,796,494	1992	
15	Lucky Trouble	$14,005,861	2011	
16	Goal II: Living the Dream	$7,864,905	2007	
17	Mean Machine	$7,310,206	2001	
18	Pelé: Birth of a Legend	$7,846,608	2016	
19	Mike Bassett: England Manager	$5,022,865	2001	
20	Fever Pitch	$4,371,089	1997	
21	Green Street	$4,333,271	2005	
22	The Damned United	$4,091,378	2009	
23	Gracie	$3,826,568	2007	
24	The Keeper	$2,056,577	2018	
25	Sixty Six	$1,930,133	2006	
26	Guys and Balls	$1,140,909	2004	

== See also ==
- List of sports films
- List of highest-grossing sports films
