= The Four Year Plan =

- Directed by: Mat Hodgson
- Written by: Mat Hodgson
- Produced by: Mat Hodgson
- Starring: Flavio Briatore; Amit Bhatia; Alejandro Agag; Neil Warnock
- Production company: Ad Hoc Films
- Release dates: 16 November 2011 (IDFA Festival); 4 March 2012; (BBC, United Kingdom)
- Country: United Kingdom
- Language: English

The Four Year Plan is a documentary film directed by Mat Hodgson about London based football club Queens Park Rangers.

== Synopsis ==
The film chronicles the take over of the nearly bankrupt club in 2007 by a consortium of billionaires and their effort to promote the team to the Premier League by 2011. The consortium consisted of Bernie Ecclestone, Flavio Briatore and Alejandro Agag, steel magnate Lakshmi Mittal and Amit Bhatia. It is an observational documentary that follows the club from within the boardroom. The cameras for this documentary were brought in by the new owners to create the film, and although the club gave permission for the cameras to be there, they had no say on where or when the cameras would be filming. The title derives from a statement made by Briatore in 2007 where he declared his 'target to be Premier League in four years'.

== Release ==
The Four Year Plan premiered on 16 November 2011 at the IDFA Festival in the Netherlands, after which it premiered on the BBC in 2012.

== Reception ==
The Guardian's Michael Hann reviewed the film favorably, calling it "a rare chance to witness the sparks that fly when business, football and machismo meet".

=== Awards ===
- Best Documentary at the Marbella Film Festival (2011, won)

== See also ==
- List of association football films
