= The Last Proletarians of Football =

- Film poster
- Swedish: Fotbollens sista proletärer
- Directed by: Martin Jönsson; Carl Pontus Hjorthén
- Written by: Carl Pontus Hjorthén
- Produced by: Kalle Gustafsson Jerneholm
- Starring: Torbjörn Nilsson; Glenn Hysén; Dan Corneliusson; Sven-Göran Eriksson
- Music by: Ian Person; Simon Ohlsson
- Production companies: Svenska Filmstudion; Sveriges Television; Film i Väst
- Release date: 4 January 2011 (Gothenburg)
- Running time: 74 minutes
- Country: Sweden
- Language: Swedish

The Last Proletarians of Football (Swedish: Fotbollens sista proletärer) is a 2011 Swedish documentary film about the football club IFK Göteborg and its success during the 1980s, but also about the development of Swedish society.

The documentary is written and directed by Martin Jönsson and Carl Pontus Hjorthén, with music by Ian Person, guitarist of former Swedish rock band The Soundtrack of Our Lives. Producer Kalle Gustafsson Jerneholm has also been a member of the band.

The title of the film alludes to how the players of IFK Göteborg during the period were part of the class of wage-earners, playing the game as amateurs in a world of professional footballers, just like the proletariat are the class of wage-earners in a capitalist society.

== Synopsis ==
The film begins by showing similarities between the politics of the Swedish Social Democratic Party with prime minister Olof Palme, and the successful semi-amateur club IFK Göteborg where all players had regular jobs as cooks, plumbers and clerks besides being footballers. Just as the combination of market economy and welfare state (the Swedish model) challenged the free market economies of Europe, IFK Göteborg challenged the fully professional European top clubs.

The Last Proletarians of Football then follow how IFK, playing in the second division from 1971 to 1976, get back to Allsvenskan in 1977 and transform into a European football powerhouse during the 1980s. Some of the players—such as Torbjörn Nilsson, Ruben Svensson, Dan Corneliusson and Glenn Hysén, alongside manager Sven-Göran Eriksson—also appear and get to tell their view of that period.

The highlight of the film shows the success in the 1981–82 UEFA Cup, which culminated in the 1982 UEFA Cup Final against Hamburger SV. The contrast between the Swedish amateur side and their well-paid opponents is repeated. HSV had just won the Bundesliga, and were so confident that even after losing 1–0 in the first match in Gothenburg, pennants proclaiming "Hamburger SV – UEFA Cup Winners 1982" (German: "Hamburger SV – UEFA-Cup-Sieger 1982") had been produced, distributed and sold in Hamburg before the second game. The Last Proletarians of Football then show how IFK Göteborg went on to beat the German team 3–0 away, the first ever European trophy won by a Swedish club (and currently only one of two as IFK repeated their success in the 1986–87 UEFA Cup).

Jönsson and Hjorthén show how Swedish society changes in the mid 1980s, diverging from the Swedish model. Ideals change, egoism is on the rise and solidarity is no longer inherent to Swedish society. They contend that the assassination of Olof Palme in February 1986 is the turning point.

But IFK Göteborg, still an amateur team, marches on and reaches the semifinals in the 1985–86 European Cup. The matches against FC Barcelona in April 1986 are then pointed out as the turning point for IFK Göteborg, and their success as an amateur club. Images from the convincing 3–0 win at home in Gothenburg, is followed by speculation about bribed referees and foul play before the match in Barcelona. Jönsson and Hjorthén argue that the rich and powerful Spanish club could not afford to lose against a Swedish amateur side. FC Barcelona goes on to win 3–0, and a goalless extra time is followed by Barcelona winning 5–4 in the penalty shoot-out.

Scenes of IFK Göteborg getting eliminated from European football then cut to the scenes of Olof Palme's funeral as the documentary ends.

== Release ==
An extended 80-minute cut of the film was sneak-previewed at the Draken cinema in Gothenburg on 4 January 2011, and on 1 April the general release 74-minute version started screening. The Last Proletarians of Football was released on DVD on 27 May 2011, early DVDs shipped with a replica of the Hamburger SV pennant claiming they won the 1982 UEFA Cup. The documentary has been televised by Sveriges Television twice, a 59-minute cut later the release year on 4 September, and the full-length film on 20 June 2012.

The Last Proletarians of Football has also been screened abroad, in Barcelona (at the OffsideFest football film festival), London, Berlin, Palermo (at the SportFilm Festival), Liverpool (at the Kicking + Screening football film festival), New York City, Rio de Janeiro, São Paulo and Bilbao.

== Reception and awards ==
The Last Proletarians of Football was praised in Sweden as well as abroad, and received favorable reviews in all the major Swedish newspapers. The main criticism the film received was that it tried to force the connection between politics and football too hard, but the connection has also been pointed out as one of the strengths of the film.

The film won the Paladino d'oro, the award for the best football film at the SportFilm Festival in Palermo and was nominated to two further categories, best film editing and best cinematography.

== See also ==
- List of association football films
