= The United Way (film) =

- Directed by: Mat Hodgson
- Produced by: Mat Hodgson; Dan Glynn; Andrew Baker; Patrick Nathanson; Matthew Lorenzo
- Starring: Eric Cantona
- Production companies: Ad Hoc Films; Cantilever Media; Embankment Films; Ingenious Media; Maddem Films
- Distributed by: Front Row Filmed Entertainment (United Arab Emirates, 2021) (Middle East, North Africa and Iran); Madman Entertainment (Australia, 2021); Tohokushinsha Film Corporation (TFC) (Japan, 2022)
- Release date: 10 May 2021
- Running time: 90 minutes
- Country: United Kingdom
- Language: English

The United Way is a 2021 British documentary film about the highs and lows of Eric Cantona's Manchester United career and Manchester United's run from the Busby Babes era to the 1999 Champions League final.

== Synopsis ==
The documentary covers the socio-economic situation of the city of Manchester, starting with the Munich air disaster, the story of Eric Cantona's transfer to Manchester United and its aftermath, what the club went through to achieve success after Matt Busby, and what happened after Manchester United signed with Alex Ferguson.

The film progresses through interviews with former footballers Eric Cantona, Alex Stepney, Brian Kidd, Steve Bruce, Bryan Robson, Ryan Giggs, David Beckham, Mark Hughes, Peter Schmeichel, Nicky Butt, Ole Gunnar Solskjær, Teddy Sheringham and Andy Cole, as well as former Manchester United Chairman Martin Edwards.

== Reception ==
The Telegraph described the film as a sporting myth presented as entertainment by Eric Cantona. The Guardian criticized the film for its determination to fail to see how the seeds of commercialisation were sown in those days. Filmhounds praised the film, stating that it offers something for everyone and that it is less about the sports and more about the characters that make it special. Irish Independent praised Eric Cantona's Manchester United film as "gloriously entertaining".

== See also ==
- List of association football films
