= Hugo Ancajima =

Peruvian footballer (born 1998)

Personal information
- Full name: Hugo Axell Ancajima Effio
- Date of birth: 10 February 1998 (age 28)
- Place of birth: Chimbote, Perú
- Height: 1.80 m (5 ft 11 in)
- Positions: Right-back; right wing-back

Team information
- Current team: ADC Juan Pablo II College

Youth career
- 2013–2015: Universidad San Martín
- 2015–2017: Sporting Cristal

Senior career*
Years	Team	Apps	(Gls)
2018–2020	Cienciano	19	(2)
2020	Pirata	0	(0)
2021	Cultural Santa Rosa	22	(0)
2022	ADT	29	(0)
2023–2026	Universitario de Deportes	39	(1)
2026-	ADC Juan Pablo II College	0	(0)
- * Club domestic league appearances and goals as of 17 November 2023

Hugo Axell Ancajima Effio is a Peruvian professional footballer who plays as a right-back for Peruvian Liga 1 club ADC Juan Pablo II College.

== Career ==
Ancajima played in the youth ranks of Universidad San Martín from 2013 to 2015. In 2015, he moved to Sporting Cristal and, in 2016, he started playing in its reserves, originally as a right winger, being part of the team that won the 2016 Torneo de Promoción y Reserva and a starter in the team which ended as a runner up in the 2017 edition.

In August 2018, after not being given opportunities to be promoted to the first team in Cristal, Ancajima was signed by Cienciano for one season and a half. He made his professional debut in a match against Unión Huaral and played regularly that semester, in a total of 14 matches. In 2019, he was part of the team that won the 2019 Liga 2; however, he did not play regularly anymore, since Sebastián Lojas was the starter in his position during nearly the whole season.

In November 2020, Ancajima was signed by Pirata, but did not play a single game there. In February 2021, he was signed by Cultural Santa Rosa, where he was reconverted into a right-back by manager Gustavo Cisneros and became a key player in the team that reached the final stages of the Liga 2, without achieving promotion.

In 2022, Ancajima was signed by Asociación Deportiva Tarma to play in the 2022 Liga 1, where he became the undisputed starter for right-back and stood out in many matches. In November 2022, after his contract with ADT finished, he was formally announced as a new signing of Universitario de Deportes, with a 2-season contract. Ancajima arrived on request by sporting director Manuel Barreto, who knew him from his time working in the youth ranks of Sporting Cristal. He played his first game with la U on matchday 3 of the 2023 Liga 1, in a 4–0 victory against Academia Cantolao, with Ancajima being one of the players who stood out the most. After the arrival of manager Jorge Fossati, he began playing as a right wing-back, becoming the usual substitute of Andy Polo.

== Honours ==
=== Club ===
Universitario de Deportes

- Peruvian Primera División: 2023
- Peruvian Primera División: 2024
- Peruvian Primera División: 2025

Cienciano

- 2019 Liga 2
