= Marco Saravia =

Peruvian footballer (born 1999)

Personal information
- Full name: Marco Antonio Saravia Antinori
- Date of birth: 6 February 1999 (age 27)
- Place of birth: Lima, Peru
- Height: 1.87 m (6 ft 2 in)
- Position: Centre-back

Team information
- Current team: Defensor Sporting
- Number: 61

Youth career
- Lima Cricket
- Cantolao
- 2017–2020: Deportivo Municipal
- 2018: → Grêmio (loan)

Senior career*
Years	Team	Apps	(Gls)
2017–2022	Deportivo Municipal	49	(2)
2018	→ Unión Comercio (loan)	2	(0)
2019	→ Unión Huaral (loan)	16	(1)
2020	→ Cusco (loan)	18	(1)
2023–2025	Universitario	21	(1)
2025	→ Cusco (loan)	15	(2)
2025–	Defensor Sporting	4	(0)

International career
2014	Peru U15		
2015	Peru U17	2	(0)
2017	Peru U18		
2019	Peru U20	1	(0)
- * Club domestic league appearances and goals as of 1 October 2025

Marco Antonio Saravia Antinori (born 6 February 1999) is a Peruvian footballer who plays as a centre-back for Uruguayan Primera División side Defensor Sporting.

== Club career ==
=== Early years ===
Saravia started playing football at the age of five, after his parents took him to a sports school. He then went to Lima Cricket and later to Academia Cantolao, where he played for 7–8 years.

=== Deportivo Municipal ===
He joined Deportivo Municipal in 2017, starting on the club's reserve team and being promoted to the first team after six months. He made his official first team debut on 21 October 2017 against Sport Huancayo. He started on the bench but replaced José Guidino in the half time. He played one further game for Municipal in the 2017 season.

==== Loan spells ====
In December 2018, it was confirmed that Saravia would play for Brazilian team Grêmio on loan for the 2018 season, where he mainly was going to play for the club's U20 team. However, he revealed in mid-August that he was considering returning to Municipal, because there were no more official games left for him until the end of the year, after Grêmio's U20 team was eliminated from the U20 tournament. Later on the same day, Saravia announced on Instagram that he had returned to Peru. After returning, he was loaned out to Unión Comercio for the rest of the year, where he made two appearances in the Peruvian Liga 1.

In the 2019 season, he was loaned out to Peruvian Liga 2 club, Unión Huaral. He made a total of 16 appearances and scored one goal. He then returned to Municipal for the 2020 season, where he continued to play for the reserve team.

In the summer 2020, Saravia moved to Cusco FC. He scored his first goal with the club in a 1–1 draw against Deportivo Municipal.

==== Back to Municipal ====
In December 2020, Municipal confirmed that he would return to the club and be a part of its squad. Saravia got the shirt number 23 after his return. At the end of November 2021, after a good season with 17 games and 1310 minutes played in the league, he signed a new contract with Municipal until the end of 2023. Afterwards, Saravia became an undisputed starter for la Academia in the 2022 season.

=== Universitario de Deportes ===
In November 2022, after the departure of Nelinho Quina, Universitario de Deportes was searching for a national centre-back and became interested in signing Saravia. Despite having an existing contract with Municipal, he managed to rescind it in order to arrive as a free agent to Universitario, with a contract for the 2023 season. That year, he won his first national championship after Universitario defeated Alianza Lima in the 2023 Liga 1 finals.

Ahead of the 2025 season, Saravia re-joined his former club, Cusco FC, on a season-long loan deal.

== International career ==
Saravia was a part of the Peruvian 2014 Summer Youth Olympics team, that won the tournament. In January 2019, he was called up for the Peruvian U20 squad, who was going to play in the 2019 South American U-20 Championship. He got his debut on 26 January 2019 against Argentina, which Peru lost 0-1. In January 2020, he was also called up for the Peruvian U23 squad, however, he sat on the bench in all four games.

== Honours ==
=== Club ===
Universitario de Deportes

- Peruvian Primera División: 2023
- Peruvian Primera División: 2024
