= Everton Morelli =

Brazilian footballer (born 1997)

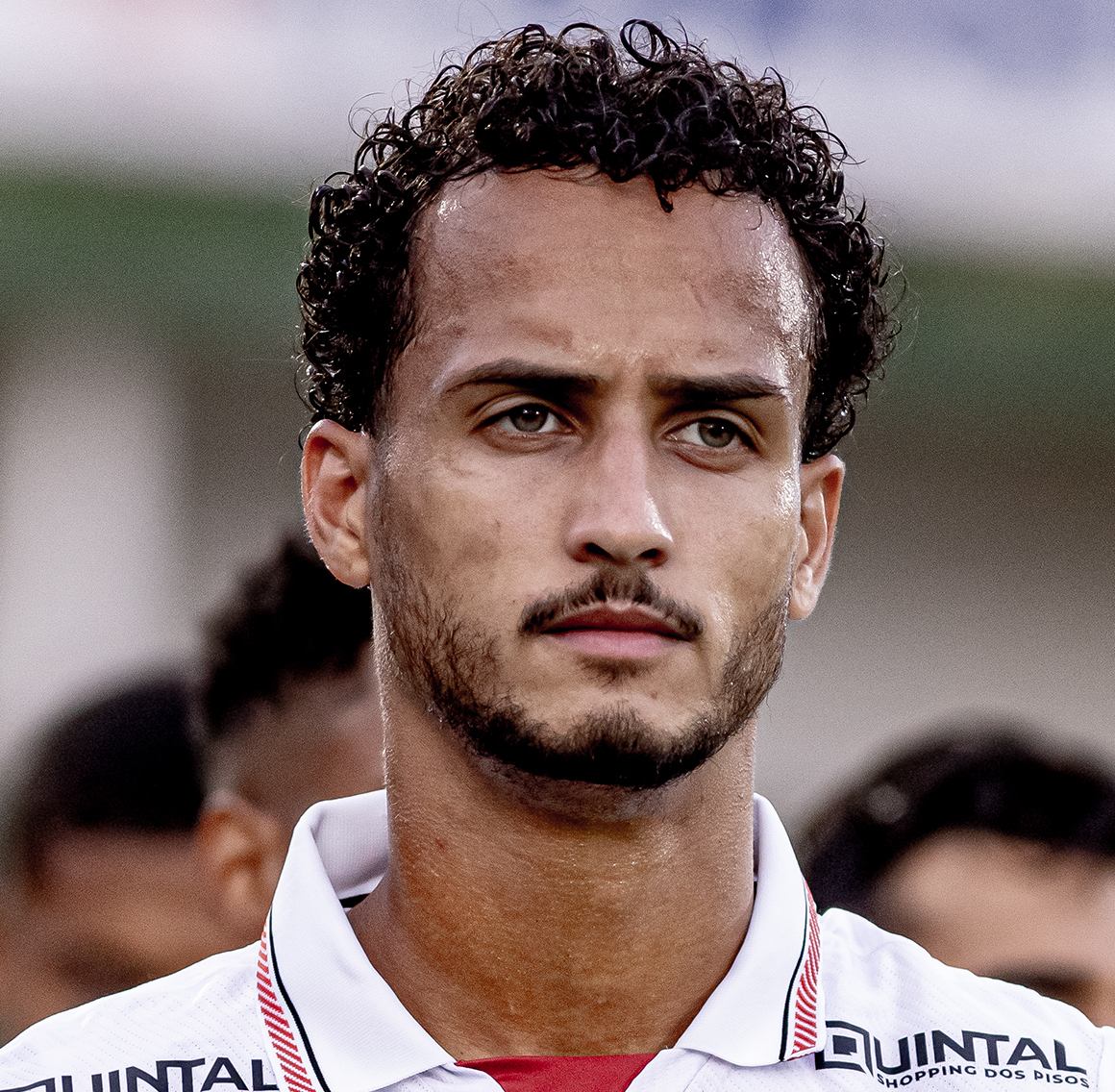
- Morelli in 2026

Personal information
- Full name: Everton Morelli Casimiro
- Date of birth: 4 November 1997 (age 29)
- Place of birth: Batatais, Brazil
- Height: 1.85 m (6 ft 1 in)
- Position: Midfielder

Team information
- Current team: Botafogo-SP
- Number: 8

Youth career
- 2016–2017: Batatais

Senior career*
Years	Team	Apps	(Gls)
2017–2022	Cianorte	46	(4)
2017–2018	→ Vitória Guimarães B (loan)	1	(0)
2018–2019	→ América Mineiro (loan)	4	(0)
2020	→ Mirassol (loan)	8	(1)
2022	→ Ypiranga-RS (loan)	12	(0)
2023–2026	Maringá	28	(4)
2023	→ Goiás (loan)	39	(4)
2024	→ Coritiba (loan)	26	(1)
2025	→ Criciúma (loan)	0	(0)
2026	→ Botafogo-SP (loan)	26	(8)
2026–	Botafogo-SP	16	(2)
- * Club domestic league appearances and goals as of 18 November 2026

Everton Morelli Casimiro (born 4 November 1997) is a Brazilian footballer who plays as a midfielder for Botafogo-SP.

== Club career ==
Morelli was born in Batatais, São Paulo, and represented hometown side Batatais FC as a youth before joining Cianorte on 8 March 2017. He made his senior debut late in the month, starting in a 1–0 Campeonato Paranaense away loss against Prudentópolis.

On 28 July 2017, Morelli moved abroad and joined Vitória de Guimarães, being assigned to the reserves in LigaPro. After just one match, he returned to Cianorte the following January, before being loaned out to América Mineiro on 20 June 2018, initially for the under-23 team.

Morelli returned to Cianorte in January 2020, but moved to Mirassol on 14 September, also in a temporary deal. Back to the Leão do Vale for the 2021 season, he was loaned to Ypiranga-RS on 18 April 2022.

On 25 November 2022, Morelli signed a permanent three-year contract with Maringá. The following 31 March, he agreed to join Série A side Goiás on loan until the end of the year.

== Career statistics ==
As of 10 February 2026

Club	Season	League			State League		Cup		Continental		Other		Total	
Club	Season	Division	Apps	Goals	Apps	Goals	Apps	Goals	Apps	Goals	Apps	Goals	Apps	Goals
Cianorte	2017	Paranaense	—		1	0	—		—		—		1	0
Cianorte	2018	Série D	2	0	6	0	1	0	—		—		9	0
Cianorte	2020	Paranaense	—		14	2	—		—		—		14	2
Cianorte	2021	Série D	3	0	12	1	4	0	—		—		19	1
Cianorte	2022	Série D	0	0	8	1	—		—		—		8	1
Cianorte	Total		5	0	41	4	5	0	—		—		51	4
Vitória Guimarães B (loan)	2017–18	LigaPro	1	0	—		—		—		—		1	0
América Mineiro (loan)	2018	Série A	0	0	—		—		—		—		0	0
América Mineiro (loan)	2019	Série B	1	0	3	0	0	0	—		—		4	0
América Mineiro (loan)	Total		1	0	3	0	0	0	—		—		4	0
Mirassol (loan)	2020	Série D	8	1	—		—		—		—		8	1
Ypiranga-RS (loan)	2022	Série C	12	0	—		—		—		—		12	0
Maringá	2023	Série D	0	0	14	2	2	1	—		—		16	3
Maringá	2024	Série D	0	0	10	1	2	0	—		—		12	1
Maringá	2025	Série C	7	0	—		—		—		—		7	0
Maringá	Total		7	0	24	3	4	1	—		—		35	4
Goiás (loan)	2023	Série A	32	3	—		—		7 (Note: Appearance(s) in Copa Sudamericana)	1	—		39	4
Coritiba (loan)	2024	Série B	26	1	—		—		—		—		26	1
Criciúma (loan)	2025	Série B	12	1	12	2	4	1	—		—		28	4
Botafogo-SP (loan)	2026	Série B	0	0	6	0	—		—		—		6	0
Career total			104	6	86	9	13	2	7	1	0	0	210	18

== Honours ==
Mirassol

- Campeonato Brasileiro Série D: 2020
