= Pele Eterno =

2004 documentary film by Aníbal Massaini Neto

Pele Forever
- Theatrical release poster
- Directed by: Anibal Massaini Neto
- Starring: Pelé
- Distributed by: Universal Pictures (through United International Pictures)
- Release date: 25 June 2004
- Running time: 120 minutes
- Country: Brazil
- Language: Portuguese

Pelé Eterno (in English: Pele Forever) is a 2004 Brazilian documentary film directed by Anibal Massaini Neto. It traces the life and career of the Brazilian soccer star Pelé, one of the greatest footballers of all time, from his poor childhood growing up in a little city, up to the present.

The film includes Pelé's greatest achievements, titles, interesting facts about his life, never before seen footage, and testimonials from personalities like Zito, Pepe, Mário Zagallo, Tostão, Rivellino, Carlos Alberto Torres, and several others.

== See also ==
- List of association football films
