= Williams Riveros =

Paraguayan footballer (born 1992)

Personal information
- Full name: Williams Ismael Riveros Ibáñez
- Date of birth: 20 November 1992 (age 33)
- Place of birth: Asunción, Paraguay
- Height: 1.88 m (6 ft 2 in)
- Position: Centre back

Team information
- Current team: Universitario de Deportes
- Number: 3

Senior career*
Years	Team	Apps	(Gls)
2010–2013	Sportivo Trinidense	2	(0)
2013–2019	Flandria	133	(9)
2017–2018	→ Temperley (loan)	16	(0)
2018–2019	→ Delfín SC (loan)	65	(7)
2020–2023	Barcelona SC	54	(4)
2022	→ Cerro Porteño (loan)	12	(0)
2023	→ Universitario de Deportes (loan)	31	(2)
2024–	Universitario de Deportes	75	(10)
- * Club domestic league appearances and goals as of 29 December 2025

Williams Ismael Riveros Ibáñez (born 20 November 1992) is a Paraguayan professional footballer who plays as a defender for Peruvian Liga 1 club Universitario de Deportes.

== Career ==
Riveros' career began in Paraguay with Sportivo Trinidense, who he made two appearances for in the 2010 Paraguayan Primera División season; his debut arriving on 1 August during a 1–5 loss to Cerro Porteño. The club was relegated in 2010, Riveros subsequently remained with them for two seasons in the División Intermedia.

In January 2013, he left to join Primera B Metropolitana's Flandria in Argentina. He made sixteen appearances for Flandria before netting his first goal, versus Tristán Suárez on 18 April 2014. Riveros scored three goals in his first three campaigns, before scoring six times in the following three. On 25 July 2017, Argentine Primera División side Temperley took him on a loan. His first match came on 27 August against River Plate. Overall, Riveros featured fifteen times whilst on loan with Temperley and, with him, the club was relegated to the Primera Nacional. He returned to a recently relegated Flandria in July 2018, prior to immediately leaving on loan once again to Ecuadorian club Delfín. Riveros netted on his Delfín debut, scoring the opening goal of a 2–0 victory over L.D.U. Quito. He became a key player and contributed to Delfín winning the 2019 Serie A and finishing as the runners-up of the 2019 Copa Ecuador.

In January 2020, Riveros was signed by Barcelona de Guayaquil. In 2022, he was sent on loan for one season to Cerro Porteño in Paraguay, where he played 14 games and was barely selected in the second half of the season.

In 2023, he was again sent on loan for one season to Universitario de Deportes in Peru, where he would play both the Liga 1 and the Copa Sudamericana. Riveros made his debut on matchday 4 of the Apertura phase against Unión Comercio; a game in which he did not have a good performance, being criticized for that. After the arrival of manager Jorge Fossati, he had a marked improvement in his game. On matchday 8 of the Clausura phase, Riveros scored the winning goal in a 1–0 home victory against Deportivo Binacional. As his first season went on, he became an undisputed starter for la U and won his third national title after Universitario defeated Alianza Lima in that year's finals. In December, after running out his contract with Barcelona, Riveros signed for Universitario with a contract for 2 seasons.

== Career statistics ==
As of 31 December 2021.

Club statistics
Club	Season	League			Cup (Note: Includes the Copa Argentina)		League Cup		Continental		Other		Total	
Club	Season	Division	Apps	Goals	Apps	Goals	Apps	Goals	Apps	Goals	Apps	Goals	Apps	Goals
Flandria	2012–13	Primera B Metropolitana	6	0	0	0	—		—		0	0	6	0
Flandria	2013–14	Primera B Metropolitana	12	1	0	0	—		—		0	0	12	1
Flandria	2014	Primera C Metropolitana	19	2	0	0	—		—		0	0	19	2
Flandria	2015	Primera B Metropolitana	40	0	2	0	—		—		0	0	42	0
Flandria	2016	Primera B Metropolitana	19	3	0	0	—		—		0	0	19	3
Flandria	2016–17	Primera B Nacional	42	3	0	0	—		—		0	0	42	3
Flandria	2017–18	Primera B Nacional	0	0	0	0	—		—		0	0	0	0
Flandria	2018–19	Primera B Metropolitana	0	0	0	0	—		—		0	0	0	0
Flandria	Total		138	9	2	0	—		—		0	0	140	9
Temperley (loan)	2017–18	Argentine Primera División	15	0	0	0	—		—		0	0	15	0
Delfín (loan)	2018	Ecuadorian Serie A	22	4	—		—		—		0	0	22	4
Delfín (loan)	2019	Ecuadorian Serie A	35	3	8	0	—		4	0	0	0	47	3
Delfín (loan)	Total		57	7	8	0	—		4	0	0	0	69	7
Barcelona SC	2020	Ecuadorian Serie A	29	2	—		—		11	0	0	0	40	2
Barcelona SC	2021	Ecuadorian Serie A	25	2	0	0	—		12	0	0	0	37	2
Barcelona SC	Total		54	4	0	0	—		23	0	0	0	77	4
Career total			266	20	10	0	—		27	0	0	0	303	20

== Honours ==
Flandria

- Primera B Metropolitana: 2016

Delfin S.C.

- Ecuadorian Serie A: 2019

Barcelona S.C.

- Liga PRO Ecuador: 2020

Universitario de Deportes

- Peruvian Primera División: 2023
- Peruvian Primera División: 2024
- Peruvian Primera División: 2025
