= Mat Hodgson =

British film director

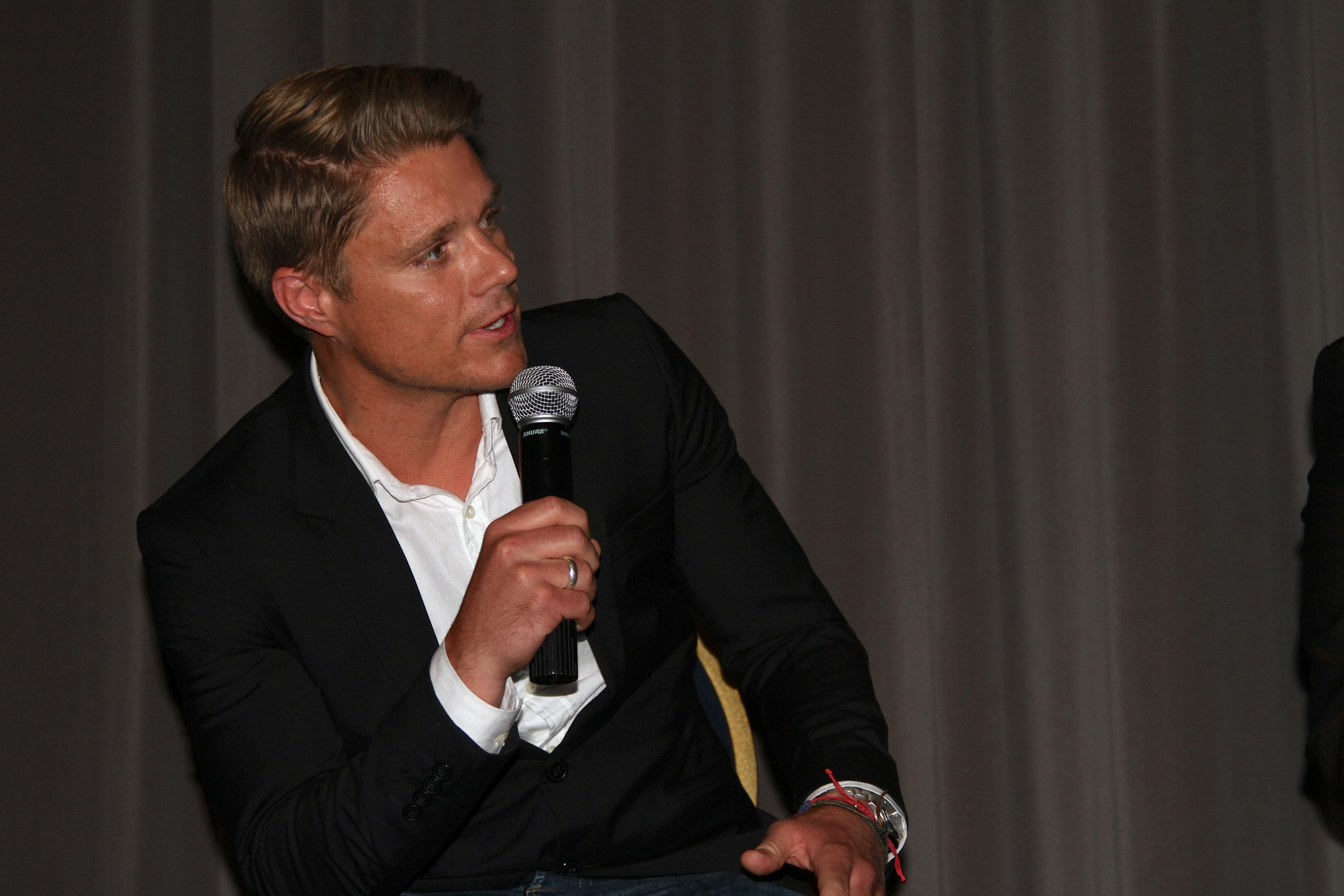
- Mat Hodgson
- Born: Berkshire, England
- Education: Churchill Academy and Sixth Form, Somerset
- Occupation: Filmmaker
- Notable work: The Four Year Plan; I Am Durán; The United Way

Mat Hodgson is a British filmmaker. His work includes The Four Year Plan, I Am Durán and The United Way.

Hodgson began his early career as a runner at Action Time and Kudos before joining Flextech Television. Following a stint at Endemol he then spent several years at MTV. From there he went onto direct and produce for BBC, ITV, Channel 4, Universal Television, Discovery. In 2005, together with Daniel Glynn, he launched his own production company, Ad Hoc Films, based in London. Following Glynn's exit of Ad Hoc in 2026, Hodgson now runs the company solely

== Documentary work ==
=== The Four Year Plan ===
Between 2007 and 2011 Hodgson filmed behind the scenes at Queens Park Rangers Football Club as he followed the ownership of Flavio Briatore, Bernie Ecclestone and Lakshmi Mittal (with his son-in-law Amit Bhatia). The film, documenting this turbulent - yet successful - period, was released in 2011 initially on DVD and in 2012 aired on BBC and Netflix. Upon its release it received huge critical acclaim, winning several awards and being shortlisted for a Grierson Award in ‘Best Documentary on a Contemporary Theme’ category. It is often referred to in top lists of best ever sports documentaries.

=== I Am Durán ===
In 2019 Universal Pictures released 'I Am Durán' – Hodgson’s documentary film about Panamanian boxer Roberto Durán. The focus of the film was to chart Durán’s rise in the sport set against the backdrop of social and political unrest in his homeland, Panama. The film features Roberto Durán, Robert De Niro, Sylvester Stallone, Mike Tyson, General Manuel Noriega, Sugar Ray Leonard, Marvelous Marvin Hagler, Don King, Bob Arum, Ricky Hatton, Lennox Lewis and Oscar De La Hoya amongst others. Noriega’s interview was his last ever broadcast interview before he died. The film reviewed favourably and once again Hodgson was shortlisted for a Grierson Award - this time in ‘Best International Documentary’ category. It saw off competition from the highly acclaimed film ‘Diego Maradona’ by Oscar winner Asif Kapadia to scoop a Focal International Award in 2020, in the 'Sports Production' category.

=== The United Way ===
In 2021 Hodgson released ‘The United Way’ – a documentary film featuring Eric Cantona on Manchester United. The film tells the story of Manchester United from the 1950’s, with the Busby Babes and the Munich Air Disaster, through to the Treble win of 1999, whilst also documenting Cantona’s time at the club. Additionally to Cantona, it features Andy Burnham, David Beckham, Ryan Giggs, Bryan Robson, Mark Hughes, Steve Bruce, Shaun Ryder, Ole Gunnar Solskjær, Nicky Butt, Peter Schmiechel, Peter Hook, Andy Cole, Teddy Sheringham, Ron Atkinson, Tommy Docherty, Lord Kinnock, Lord Heseltine etc The United Way includes an original score by four-time Academy-nominated composer George Fenton.

=== Other Documentary Work ===
Additionally, Hodgson has produced, directed, showrunned and executive produced several documentary titles, which include Mission to Burnley, Josh Taylor:Portrait of a Fighter, Night of the Fight: Hatton’s Last Stand, Sleeping Giant: An Indian Football Story, Fight Game: The McGuigans, Frampton: Return of the Jackal, 48 Hours with Muhammed Ali, Brothers in Sand and Once Were Lions.

== Personal life ==
Hodgson lives in London with his wife Monique and their 2 children.
