= Matías Di Benedetto =

Argentine footballer (born 1992)

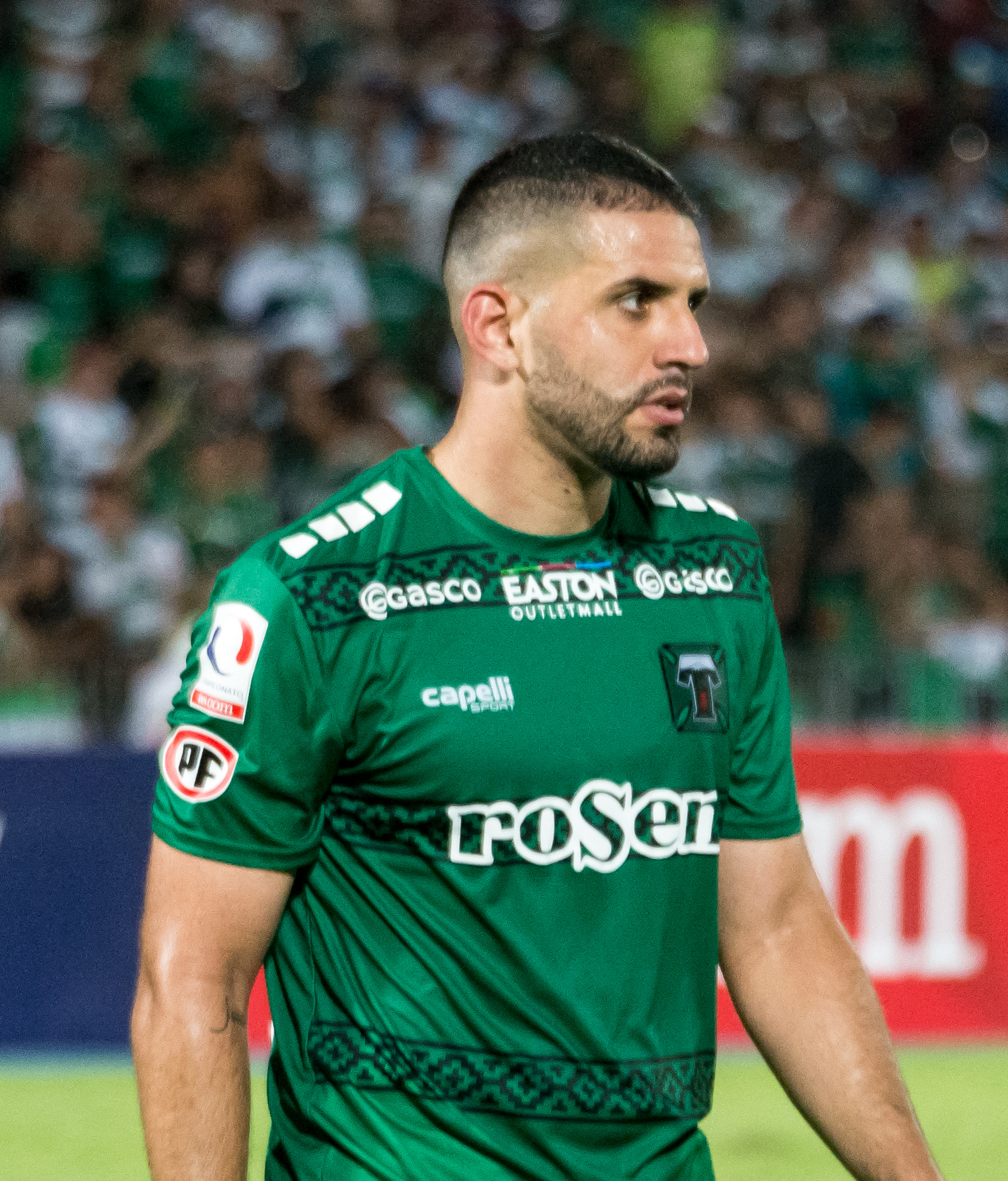
- Di Benedetto playing with Deportes Temuco in 2020.

Personal information
- Full name: Matías Ezequiel Di Benedetto
- Date of birth: 19 November 1992 (age 33)
- Place of birth: José Mármol, Buenos Aires, Argentina
- Height: 1.84 m (6 ft 0 in)
- Position: Central defender

Team information
- Current team: Universitario
- Number: 5

Youth career
- 2011-2013: Arsenal de Sarandí

Senior career*
Years	Team	Apps	(Gls)
2014	Unión Mar del Plata	1	(0)
2015	Villa San Carlos	2	(0)
2015–2018	Almagro	51	(1)
2018	Gimnasia de Jujuy	0	(0)
2019–2021	Deportes Temuco	90	(6)
2022	Central Córdoba SdE	21	(0)
2023–	Universitario	104	(3)
- * Club domestic league appearances and goals as of 1 December 2025

Matías Ezequiel Di Benedetto (born 19 November 1992) is an Argentine professional footballer who plays as a central defender for Peruvian Liga 1 club Universitario.

== Career ==
Di Benedetto came from the youth ranks of Arsenal de Sarandí, where he played from 2011 to 2013. He debuted in Unión de Mar del Plata in 2014. He then signed for a semester in Villa San Carlos. In the 2nd half of 2015, Di Benedetto signed with Club Almagro, being part of the squad that achieved promotion to the Primera B Nacional. He managed to stand out in Almagro's defense and played important matches, but with the arrival of manager Sebastián Battaglia in March 2018, Di Benedetto was progressively erased from the starting XI. For a long time, he shared the center of the defense with Richard Schunke.

He then signed for Gimnasia y Esgrima de Jujuy, although he never managed to make an appearance from the start and only came twice from the bench. In late 2018, Di Benedetto rescinded his contract. Later, he accepted an offer to emigrate and play in Deportes Temuco, where he became an important piece of the defense, even wearing the captain's armband several times. He played a total of 99 matches.

In 2022, Di Benedetto signed for Central Córdoba for one season, where he played regularly but was always the third option for centre-back, behind Fabio Pereyra and Franco Sbuttoni. A month before the end of his contract with Central Córdoba, Di Benedetto received a proposal to play in Universitario de Deportes.

On December 6, 2022, he was formally announced as a new signing of Universitario for the 2023 season. On May 5, in a Copa Sudamericana match against Santa Fe, Di Benedetto scored his first goal with la U: the defender headed the ball into the net to end the game 2–0 in favor of Universitario. He played all of the group stage matches, where the Peruvian team placed second and qualified to the play-off round. On July 7, against Academia Cantolao in the Estadio Nacional, Di Benedetto scored his first goal in the Liga 1 and his second with los cremas. By the end of his first season in Peru, he had become an undisputed starter for Universitario and helped the team win the league after defeating Alianza Lima in the final, which gave Di Benedetto his first national trophy. In December 2023, he renewed his contract for a further 2 seasons.

== Career statistics ==
As of 18 November 2023

Club statistics
Club	Season	League			Cup		Continental		Total	
Club	Season	Division	Apps	Goals	Apps	Goals	Apps	Goals	Apps	Goals
Unión de Mar del Plata	2014	Torneo Federal A	0	0	1	0	0	0	1	0
Villa San Carlos	2015	Primera B Metropolitana	2	0	0	0	0	0	2	0
Almagro	2015	Primera B Metropolitana	7	0	0	0	0	0	7	0
Almagro	2016	Primera Nacional	2	1	0	0	0	0	2	1
Almagro	2016–17	Primera Nacional	32	0	1	0	0	0	33	0
Almagro	2017–18	Primera Nacional	10	0	0	0	0	0	10	0
Almagro	Total		51	1	1	0	0	0	52	1
Gimnasia de Jujuy	2018–19	Primera Nacional	0	0	1	0	0	0	1	0
Deportes Temuco	2019	Primera B de Chile	28	4	5	0	0	0	33	4
Deportes Temuco	2020	Primera B de Chile	28	1	0	0	0	0	28	1
Deportes Temuco	2021	Primera B de Chile	34	1	4	0	0	0	38	1
Deportes Temuco	Total		90	6	9	0	0	0	99	6
Central Córdoba	2022	Argentine Primera División	21	0	1	0	0	0	22	0
Universitario de Deportes	2023	Peruvian Liga 1	33	1	0	0	8	1	41	2
Career total			197	8	13	0	8	1	218	9

== Honours ==
Universitario de Deportes

- Liga 1: 2023, 2024, 2025
