= José Bolívar =

Peruvian footballer (born 2000)

Personal information
- Full name: José Vidal Bolivar Ormeño
- Date of birth: 17 January 2000 (age 26)
- Place of birth: Lima, Peru
- Height: 1.75 m (5 ft 9 in)
- Positions: Left back; left winger

Team information
- Current team: Atlético Grau
- Number: 14

Youth career
- Universidad San Martín

Senior career*
Years	Team	Apps	(Gls)
2016–2020	Universidad San Martín	81	(1)
2021–2022	Sport Boys	55	(0)
2023–	Universitario de Deportes	24	(0)
2024	→ Universidad Cesar Vallejo (loan)	15	(0)
2025–	→ Atlético Grau (loan)	29	(2)

International career
2015–2017	Peru U17	5	(0)
2019	Peru U20	1	(0)
- * Club domestic league appearances and goals as of 28 December 2025

José Vidal Bolivar Ormeño (born 17 January 2000) is a Peruvian football player who plays as left back for Peruvian Liga 1 club Atlético Grau on loan from Universitario de Deportes.

== Career ==
Bolívar played in the youth ranks of Universidad San Martín. Before the 2016 season, he was promoted to the first team by manager José del Solar. Still 16 years old, Bolívar made his professional debut in April on matchday 12, coming on the pitch with the #7 shirt in the 55th minute in a 0–1 home defeat against Juan Aurich. On matchday 16, Bolívar played his first game as a starter in a 1–0 away loss against Deportivo Municipal. In 2018 and 2019, under manager Carlos Bustos, he established himself as San Martín's starting left-back.

== Career statistics ==
=== Club ===
As of 28 September 2023.

Club	Division	Season	League		Cup		Continental		Total	
Club	Division	Season	Apps	Goals	Apps	Goals	Apps	Goals	Apps	Goals
Universidad San Martín	Liga 1	2016	6	0	0	0	—		6	0
Universidad San Martín	Liga 1	2017	2	0	0	0	—		2	0
Universidad San Martín	Liga 1	2018	27	1	9	1	—		36	2
Universidad San Martín	Liga 1	2019	23	0	4	0	—		27	0
Universidad San Martín	Liga 1	2020	23	0	0	0	—		23	0
Universidad San Martín	Total		81	1	13	1	0	0	94	2
Sport Boys	Liga 1	2021	22	0	2	1	—		24	1
Sport Boys	Liga 1	2022	33	0	0	0	—		33	0
Sport Boys	Total		55	0	2	1	0	0	57	1
Universitario de Deportes	Liga 1	2023	22	0	0	0	5	0	27	0
Career total			149	0	15	2	5	0	169	2

== Honours ==
Universitario de Deportes

- Peruvian Primera División: 2023
- Torneo Apertura: 2024
