= Rodrigo Ureña =

Chilean footballer (born 1993)

Personal information
- Full name: Rodrigo Andrés Ureña Reyes
- Date of birth: March 1, 1993 (age 33)
- Place of birth: Conchalí, Santiago, Chile
- Height: 1.78 m (5 ft 10 in)
- Position: Midfielder

Team information
- Current team: Millonarios
- Number: 18

Youth career
- Juanita Aguirre
- 2003–2012: Unión Española

Senior career*
Years	Team	Apps	(Gls)
2012	Unión Española	2	(0)
2012	Unión Española B	6	(0)
2013–2016	Universidad de Chile	10	(0)
2013–2015	→ Cobresal (loan)	49	(2)
2016	→ Cobresal (loan)	14	(0)
2017	Deportes Temuco	7	(1)
2017	Palestino	0	(0)
2017	→ Deportes Antofagasta (loan)	7	(0)
2018–2019	Cobresal	31	(3)
2020–2021	América de Cali	57	(2)
2022	Deportes Tolima	36	(3)
2023–2025	Universitario	79	(2)
2026–	Millonarios	10	(0)

International career^{‡}
2025–	Chile	1	(0)
- * Club domestic league appearances and goals as of 4 January 2026 ‡ National team caps and goals as of 10 June 2025

Rodrigo Andrés Ureña Reyes (born 1 March 1993) is a Chilean professional footballer who plays as a midfielder for Colombian club Millonarios.

== Club career ==
As a youth player, Ureña was with club Juanita Aguirre from Conchalí, Santiago, before joining Unión Española, where he coincided with Williams Alarcón.

Ureña played in the youth ranks of Unión Española since 2003 at the age of 10, reaching the U15 team in 2008 and the U20 in 2011. He made his debut in May 2012 in an Torneo Apertura match against Deportes Antofagasta. While playing in the 2012 U-20 Copa Libertadores, Ureña refused to sign a professional contract due to the low salary that the club was offering him. In October 2012, he bought his own player rights and was left a free agent, after disagreements with Union Española's board.

A week later, Ureña was signed by Universidad de Chile, on request by manager Jorge Sampaoli, and was the club's first signing for the 2013 season. He made his debut with la U in March 2013 in a 3–1 victory against Cobresal, coming from the bench in the 66th minute. Due to an excess of midfielders in the squad, such as Rodrigo Rojas and Charles Aránguiz, he did not have many opportunities to play. Because of this, he was sent on loan to Cobresal twice, from 2013 to 2015 and again in 2016.

After these two loan spells and three stages of playing with Universidad de Chile, in 2017, Ureña was announced as a signing of Deportes Temuco. Due to not playing regularly enough there, he left for Deportivo Palestino, where he stayed for two months before being loaned to Deportes Antofagasta.

Following a six-month period of inactivity, Ureña arrived at Cobresal for the 2nd half of 2018, the team in which he had had his best performance in Chile. His contract was later renewed for the 2019 season, in which he became the team's captain and one of the best players of the tournament.

In January 2020, Ureña was announced as a signing by Colombian club América de Cali. He played there for two seasons, winning the 2020 Categoría Primera A. In January 2022, he was announced as a signing by Deportes Tolima.

After finishing his contract with Tolima, in November 2022, Ureña was announced as a signing by Peruvian club Universitario de Deportes, with a contract for one season. He played his first game with Universitario on matchday 3, in a 4–0 victory against Academia Cantolao, and scored his first goal on matchday 19, in a 2–0 victory against Alianza Atlético. In November 2023, following a season in which he consolidated himself as an undisputed starter, Ureña won the 2023 Liga 1 with la U, ending a 10-year drought for the team. The following season, he won the 2024 Torneo Apertura.

Ureña left Universitario at the end of 2025. On 4 January 2026, he signed a two-year contract with Colombian club Millonarios.

== International career ==
Ureña received his first call-up to the Chile national team for the 2026 FIFA World Cup qualification matches against Argentina and Bolivia in June 2025 and made his debut in the second match.

== Career statistics ==
=== Club ===
As of 12 July 2025

Club	Season	League			Cup		League Cup		Continental		Other		Total	
Club	Season	Division	Apps	Goals	Apps	Goals	Apps	Goals	Apps	Goals	Apps	Goals	Apps	Goals
Unión Española	2012	Chilean Primera División	2	0	0	0	—		0	0	—		2	0
Unión Española B	2012	Segunda División Profesional	6	0	0	0	—		3	0	—		9	0
Universidad de Chile	2013	Chilean Primera División	4	0	1	0	—		0	0	—		5	0
Universidad de Chile	2014	Chilean Primera División	0	0	1	0	—		—		—		1	0
Universidad de Chile	2015–16	Chilean Primera División	4	0	4	0	—		—		—		8	0
Universidad de Chile	2016–17	Chilean Primera División	2	0	1	0	—		—		—		3	0
Universidad de Chile	Total		10	0	7	0	—		—		—		17	0
Cobresal (loan)	2013–14	Chilean Primera División	2	0	—		—		—		—		2	0
Cobresal (loan)	2014–15	Chilean Primera División	30	1	0	0	—		2 (Note: Appearances in Copa Sudamericana)	0	—		32	0
Cobresal (loan)	2015–16	Chilean Primera División	14	0	0	0	—		4 (Note: Appearances in Copa Libertadores)	0	—		18	0
Cobresal (loan)	Total		46	1	0	0	—		6	0	—		52	1
Deportes Temuco	2016–17	Chilean Primera División	7	1	—		—		—		—		7	1
Deportes Antofagasta (loan)	2017	Chilean Primera División	7	0	—		—		—		—		7	0
Cobresal	2018	Chilean Primera División	14	0	0	0	—		—		—		14	0
Cobresal	2019	Chilean Primera División	17	3	2	0	—		—		—		19	3
Cobresal	Total		31	3	2	0	—		—		—		33	3
América de Cali	2020	Categoría Primera A	14	1	2	0	—		—		2 (Note: Appearances in Superliga Águila de Campeones)	0	18	1
América de Cali	2021	Categoría Primera A	43	1	4	0	—		4 (Note: Two appearances in Copa Libertadores, two appearances in Copa Sudamericana)	0	2 (Note: Appearances in Superliga Águila de Campeones)	0	53	1
América de Cali	Total		57	2	6	0	—		4	0	4	0	71	2
Deportes Tolima	2022	Categoría Primera A	36	3	2	0	—		7	0	0	0	45	3
Universitario	2023	Chilean Primera División	34	1	0	0	—		8	0	—		42	1
Universitario	2024	Chilean Primera División	21	1	0	0	—		6	0	—		27	1
Universitario	2025	Chilean Primera División	15	0	0	0	—		5	0	—		20	0
Universitario	Total		70	2	0	0	—		19	0	—		89	2
Career total			262	12	17	0	0	0	39	0	4	0	322	12

=== International ===
As of match played 10 June 2025

Appearances and goals by national team and year
National team	Year	Apps	Goals
Chile	2025	1	0
Total		1	0

== Honours ==
Club Universidad de Chile

- 2012–13 Copa Chile, 2015 Copa Chile
- 2015 Supercopa de Chile

Cobresal

- 2015 Clausura

América de Cali

- 2020 Categoría Primera A season

Deportes Tolima

- 2022 Superliga Colombiana

Universitario de Deportes

- Peruvian Primera División: 2023
- Peruvian Primera División: 2024
- Peruvian Primera División: 2025
