= Jean Ferrari =

Peruvian footballer (born 1975)

Personal information
- Full name: Jean Franco Ferrari Chiabra
- Date of birth: 29 July 1975 (age 51)
- Place of birth: Callao, Peru
- Height: 1.81 m (5 ft 11 in)
- Position: Midfielder

Team information
- Current team: Universitario (sporting director)

Youth career
- –1990: Cantolao
- 1990–1992: Universitario

Senior career*
Years	Team	Apps	(Gls)
1993–1995	Deportivo San Agustín		
1996–1998	Universitario	17	(0)
1998–1999	Extremadura	1	(1)
1999–2001	Sporting Cristal	80	(6)
2002	Cienciano	17	(6)
2002	Sporting Cristal	6	(0)
2003	Universitario	20	(1)
2003	América Cali	12	(2)
2004	Cienciano	4	(0)
2004–2005	Sport Boys	67	(4)
2006	Cienciano	11	(0)
2006	Sport Boys	18	(1)
2007	Deportivo Municipal	18	(0)
2008–2009	Melgar	81	(2)
2010–2011	León de Huánuco	51	(0)

International career
1996–2001	Peru	3	(0)

Managerial career
- 2012: León de Huánuco (assistant)
- 2012: León de Huánuco
- * Club domestic league appearances and goals

Jean Franco Ferrari Chiabra (born 29 July 1975) is a Peruvian former professional footballer who played as a midfielder. He became the manager of Universitario de Deportes with which he won the 2015 Torneo del Inca. As a result of his success, he later took on a role as director of football at the Peruvian Football Federation.

== Club career ==
Jean Ferrari began his senior career playing for Deportivo San Agustín in the 1995 Torneo Descentralizado season.

He then played for Universitario from 1996 to 1998, making 17 appearances in the 1997 season.

On 13 August 2019, Ferrari was appointed sporting director of his former club, Universitario.

Ferrari then had a spell with La liga side CF Extremadura in the 1998–99 season. His stay in Spain was one year, between 1998 and 1999, due to the lack of continuity he returned to Peru to play for Sporting Cristal.

== Post-playing career ==
After his retirement, Ferrari was coach of Leon de Huanuco, TV announcer and athletic director with Club Deportivo Universidad César Vallejo. In this role, he won the Torneo del Inca National Title in 2015. Ferrari later became the Director of Football of the Peruvian Football Federation. In 2025, he was involved in a dispute with Óscar Ibáñez that led to Ibáñez resigning as the manager of the Peru national football team. Ibáñez claimed the President of the Peruvian Football Federation Agustín Lozano wanted him to extend his contract for the last friendly matches in 2025. However, Ferrari contradicted Lozano a few days after the offer and stated that Ibáñez's contract would not be renewed.

Ferrari was a candidate for Congress with National Victory in the 2021 Peruvian general elections.

== Honours ==
Universitario de Deportes

- 1998 Torneo Descentralizado
