= Jorge Fossati =

Uruguayan footballer and coach (born 1952)

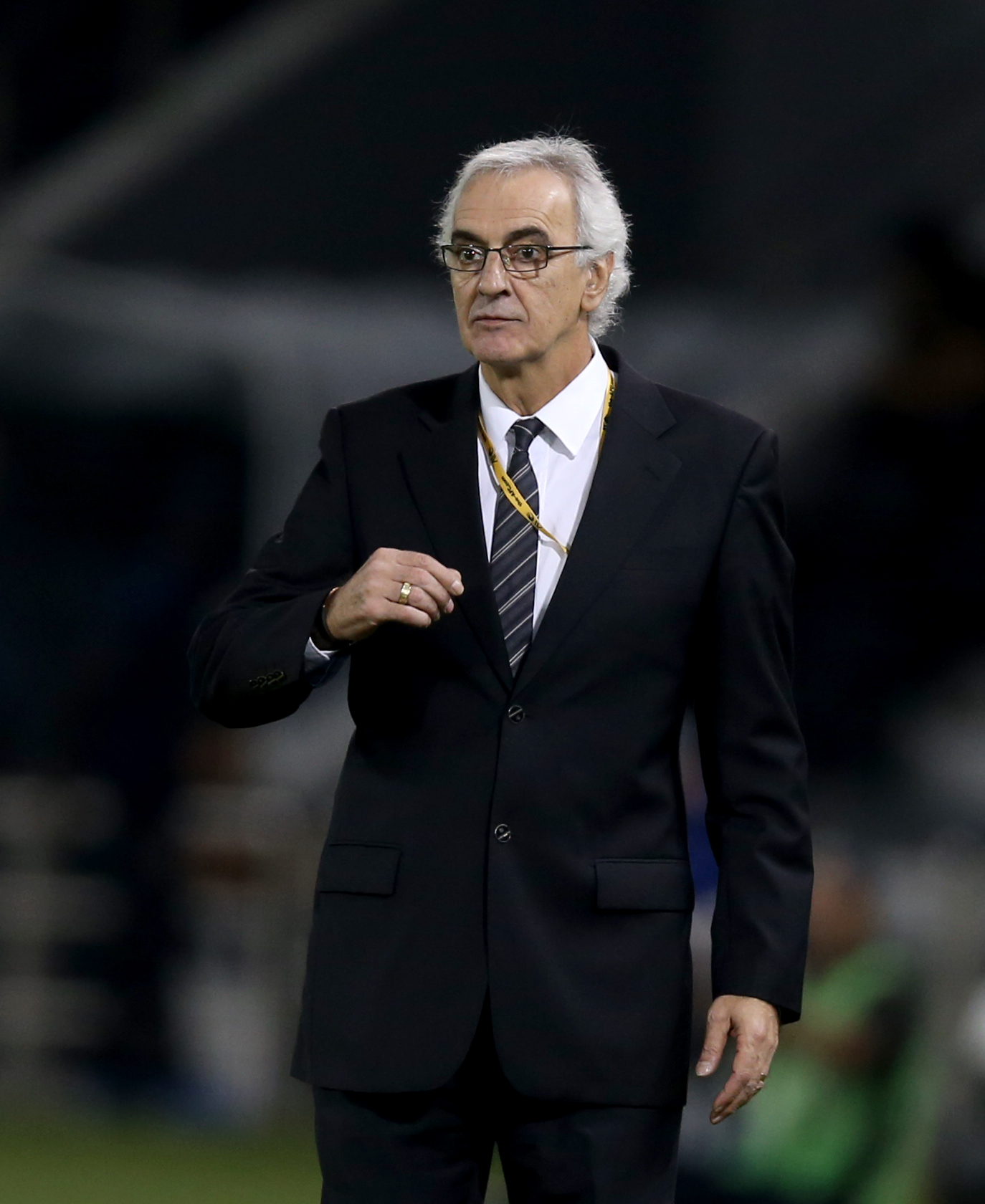
- Fossati in 2016

Personal information
- Full name: Jorge Daniel Fossati Lurachi
- Date of birth: 22 November 1952 (age 73)
- Place of birth: Tacuarembo, Uruguay
- Height: 1.91 m (6 ft 3 in)
- Position: Goalkeeper

Team information
- Current team: Liverpool Montevideo (manager)

Senior career*
Years	Team	Apps	(Gls)
1970–1971	Rampla Juniors		
1972	Central Español		
1973–1980	Peñarol	124	(0)
1980–1981	Independiente	20	(0)
1982	Millonarios		
1982–1983	Olimpia	41	(0)
1983–1985	Green Cross Temuco		
1985–1987	Rosario Central	16	(0)
1987–1988	Mandiyú de Corrientes	15	(0)
1988–1989	Avaí	19	(0)
1989–1990	Coritiba	21	(0)

International career
1975–1985	Uruguay	3	(0)

Managerial career
- 1993–1995: River Plate Montevideo
- 1996: Peñarol
- 1997: Cerro Porteño
- 1998–2001: Danubio
- 2001–2002: Colón de Santa Fe
- 2002–2003: Danubio
- 2003–2004: LDU Quito
- 2004–2006: Uruguay
- 2006–2007: Al-Sadd
- 2007–2008: Qatar
- 2009: LDU Quito
- 2009–2010: Internacional
- 2010: Al-Shabab
- 2010–2012: Al-Sadd
- 2012–2013: Cerro Porteño
- 2013: Al-Ain
- 2014–2015: Peñarol
- 2015–2016: Al Rayyan
- 2016–2017: Qatar
- 2019: Al-Ahli
- 2019–2021: River Plate Montevideo
- 2021–2022: Danubio
- 2023: Universitario
- 2023–2025: Peru
- 2025: Universitario
- 2026–: Liverpool Montevideo
- * Club domestic league appearances and goals

Jorge Daniel Fossati Lurachi (born 22 November 1952 in Tacuarembo) is a Uruguayan football manager and former player who played as a goalkeeper. He is the current manager of Liverpool Montevideo.

== Club career ==
Fossati played mainly in Peñarol, where he helped the club win five league titles. He also had spells in Argentina with Independiente and Rosario Central, in Colombia with Millonarios, in Paraguay with Olimpia, in Chile with Green Cross Temuco (currently Deportes Temuco) and in Brazil with Coritiba.

He played for Mandiyú de Corrientes, of Argentina, in 1987 and in 1988, and for Brazilian club Avaí in 1989.

== Managerial career ==
Having played as a goalkeeper during his footballing tenure, Fossati states that he had the opportunity to view matches through the perspective of a spectator and the ability to interpret the plays. He began coaching his teammates as a goalkeeper under the supervision of the coach. As Fossati aged, he started to write analyses of the games and coaches, noting which facets he would have adjusted.

After retiring as a player, he decided to take up management. In the beginning, Fossati had spells in charge of River Plate Montevideo, Peñarol (where he won a league title) and Danubio F.C. in Uruguay. He also had spells as manager of Colón de Santa Fe in Argentina, Cerro Porteño in Paraguay and LDU Quito in Ecuador.

Fossati became manager of the Uruguay national team in 2004, signing at a time in which the team was about to miss qualifying to the 2006 World Cup. He managed to take Uruguay out of the lower places in the qualifying table and into the inter-confederation play-off spot. Despite his and the players' efforts, Uruguay lost the play-off against Australia on penalties. Fossati was then replaced as manager of Uruguay by Óscar Tabárez.

He next coached Al-Sadd in Qatar and, after winning all four domestic titles with them, was unveiled as the new Qatari national team manager in 2007. In late 2008, it was announced that Fossati would undergo surgery. Subsequently, the Qatar FA ended their cooperation with him, who supposedly needed too long to recover from surgery.

In 2009, he signed with LDU Quito from Ecuador to manage the team for the second time, replacing Edgardo Bauza. Fossati helped LDU Quito win the Recopa Sudamericana 2009 matches against Sport Club Internacional de Porto Alegre. LDU Quito won both games of the Recopa 1–0 and 3–0, respectively. This gave LDU Quito their second international title. In December 2009, Fossati and LDU won the Copa Sudamericana after defeating Fluminense 5–4 on aggregate in the finals.

After Internacional and Mário Sergio parted ways, as per their previous agreement, the Brazilian club reached a deal with Fossati. On 13 December 2009, he joined Internacional for one year. Following negative results, he was fired on 28 May 2010. Fossati left Internacional in the semi-finals of the Copa Libertadores after defeating reigning champions Estudiantes de La Plata in the quarter-finals; Internacional would go on to win the Libertadores.

After that, he was named as head coach of Al-Shabab and nearly reached that season's AFC Champions League final with the team. Fossati was sacked by Al-Shabab in December 2010, but returned for another crack at the continental title, after being put in charge of Al-Sadd for a second time between 2010 and 2012, during which he won the 2011 AFC Champions League and reached the semi-finals of the 2011 FIFA Club World Cup. Fossati left Al-Sadd on 19 May 2012 and joined Club Cerro Porteño.

On 26 July 2013, Fossati signed a two-year contract with United Arab Emirates champions Al Ain to replace Cosmin Olăroiu. He became the coach of the Qatar national football team in 2016. Like Fossati, all of the football management of 'The Maroons' were Uruguayan. In June 2019, he returned to River Plate Montevideo.

In March 2023, Fossati joined Club Universitario de Deportes, after the departure of Carlos Compagnucci. His contract would end in December 2023 amid rumours of Fossati signing over to the Peru national football team. On 27 December 2023, Peru would officialize the signing of Fossati as head coach.

Fossati was sacked by the Peru national team on 15 January 2025, with the nation in the last position of the 2026 FIFA World Cup qualification. On 20 April, he returned to Universitario.

After leaving Universitario by mutual consent on 11 December 2025, Fossati returned to his home country and took over Liverpool Montevideo on 25 April 2026.

== Managerial statistics ==
As of match played 19 November 2024

Managerial record by team and tenure
Team	From	To	Record				
Team	From	To	P	W	D	L	Win %
Al-Sadd	30 June 2006	25 May 2007	44	25	9	10	56.82
Al-Shabab	30 June 2010	30 December 2011	12	7	4	1	58.33
Peru	28 December 2023	14 January 2024	13	4	4	5	30.77
Total			69	36	17	16	52.17

== Honours ==
=== Player ===
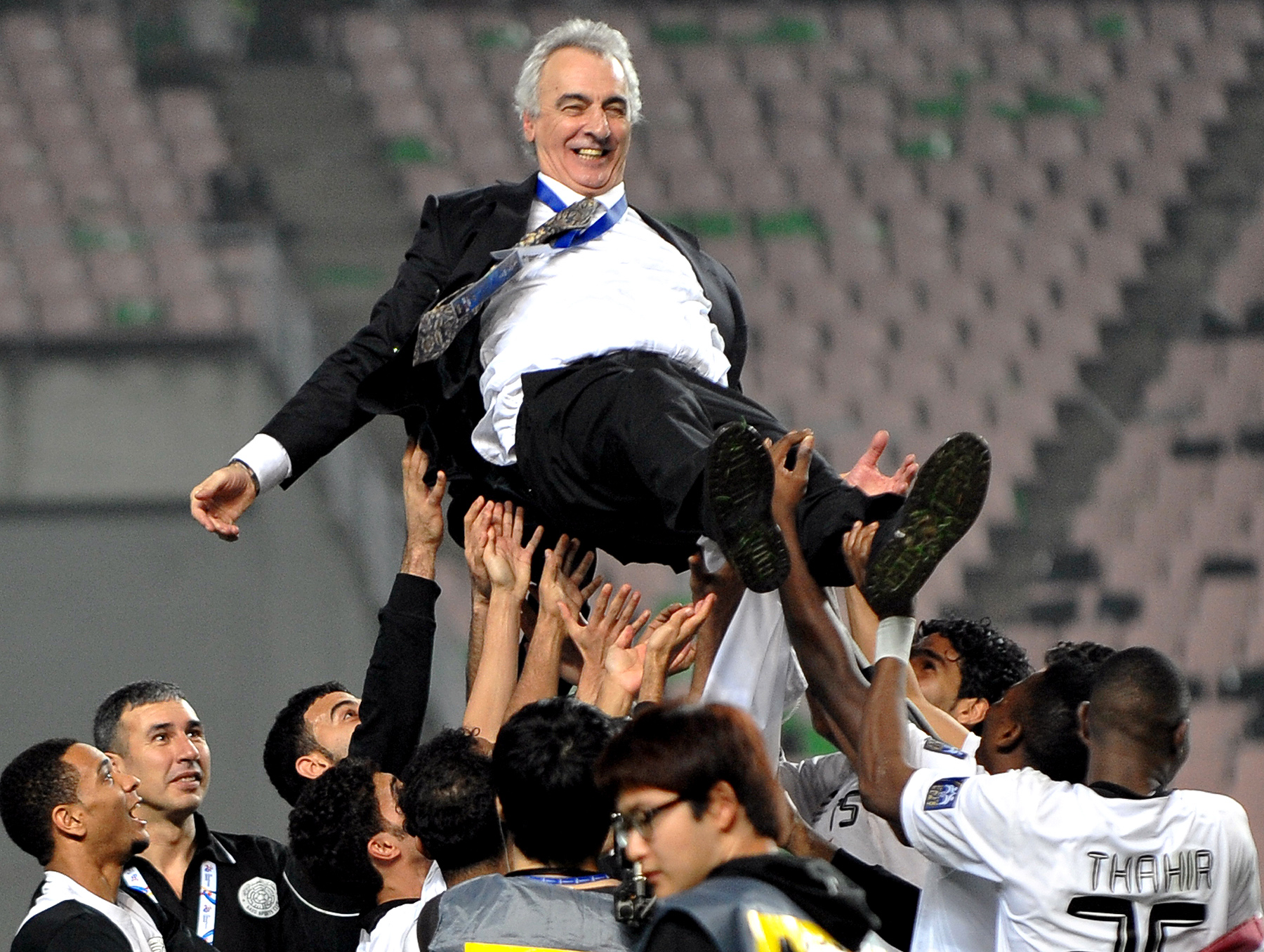
Fossati after winning AFC Champions League in 2011.

=== Club ===
Peñarol

- Uruguayan Primera División: 1973, 1974, 1975, 1978, 1979

Olimpia

- Paraguayan Primera División: 1983

Rosario Central

- Argentine Primera División: 1986–87

Avaí

- Campeonato Catarinense: 1988

=== Club ===
Peñarol

- Uruguayan Primera División: 1996

LDU Quito

- Ecuadorian Serie A: 2003
- Recopa Sudamericana: 2009
- Copa Sudamericana: 2009

Al-Sadd

- Qatar Stars League: 2006–07
- Emir Cup: 2007
- Crown Prince Cup: 2006, 2007
- Sheikh Jassem Cup: 2007
- AFC Champions League: 2011

Cerro Porteño

- Paraguayan Primera División: 2012

Al-Rayyan

- Qatar Stars League: 2015–16

Universitario de Deportes

- Peruvian Primera División: 2023, 2025

=== International ===
Uruguay

- Copa América third place: 2004
