= List of UEFA Cup and Europa League top scorers =

The UEFA Europa League, known until 2009 as the UEFA Cup, is an annual association football cup competition organised by UEFA since 1971, and it is the second most important club competition in Europe. Originally a knockout competition, it later evolved to include group stages and a series of qualifying rounds. This article lists both the competition's seasonal top scorers and overall top scorers, including a list of goals scored in the competition proper and a list of goals scored including qualifying rounds.

== All-time top scorers (group stage/league phase to final) ==
Rank	Player	Goal	Apps	Ratio	Years	Club (Goal/Match)
1	(Gabon) Pierre-Emerick Aubameyang	34	62	0.55	2009-2024	Lille OSC (0/7), Borussia Dortmund (8/10), Arsenal F.C. (14/26), FC Barcelona (2/6), Olympique de Marseille (10/13)
2	(Sweden) Henrik Larsson	31	45	0.69	1996-2009	Feyenoord (1/6), Celtic F.C. (24/31), Helsingborgs IF (6/8)
3	(Colombia) Radamel Falcao	30	31	0.97	2010-2021	FC Porto (17/14), Atlético Madrid (13/17)
3	(Netherlands) Klaas-Jan Huntelaar	30	50	0.6	2004-2020	SC Heerenveen (5/13), AFC Ajax (11/15), FC Schalke 04 (14/22)
5	(Germany) Dieter Müller	29	36	0.81	1973-1983	1. FC Köln (25/31), VfB Stuttgart (1/2), FC Girondins de Bordeaux (3/3)
6	(Bosnia and Herzegovina) Edin Džeko	28	60	0.47	2003-2025	FK Željezničar Sarajevo (0/1), VfL Wolfsburg (5/14), Manchester City F.C. (3/7), AS Roma (17/26), Fenerbahçe S.K. (3/12)
7	(Belgium) Romelu Lukaku	27	46	0.59	2009-2024	RSC Anderlecht (5/18), Everton F.C. (8/9), Inter Milan (7/6), AS Roma (7/13)
7	(Portugal) Bruno Fernandes	27	58	0.47	2018-2025	Sporting CP (11/19), Manchester United F.C. (16/39)
9	(Spain) Aritz Aduriz	26	39	0.67	2012-2018	Valencia CF (0/6), Athletic Bilbao (26/33)
9	(France) Alexandre Lacazette	26	58	0.45	2012-2025	Olympique Lyonnais (13/31), Arsenal F.C. (13/27)
11	(Italy) Alessandro Altobelli	25	58	0.43	1977-1989	Inter Milan (21/50), Juventus FC (4/8)
12	(Georgia (country)) Shota Arveladze	24	41	0.61	1994-2007	FC Dinamo Tbilisi (1/2), Trabzonspor (2/2), AFC Ajax (10/13), Rangers F.C. (2/7), AZ Alkmaar (9/17)
12	(Israel) Mu'nas Dabbur	24	49	0.49	2011-2021	Maccabi Tel Aviv F.C. (1/8), FC Red Bull Salzburg (14/28), Sevilla FC (3/6), TSG 1899 Hoffenheim (6/7)
12	(France) Kevin Gameiro	24	54	0.44	2005-2019	RC Strasbourg Alsace (2/3), Paris Saint-Germain F.C. (0/5), Sevilla FC (17/33), Atlético Madrid (2/5), Valencia CF (3/8)
15	(Germany) Jupp Heynckes	23	21	1.1	1972-1975	Borussia Mönchengladbach
15	(Brazil) Vágner Love	23	36	0.64	2005-2021	PFC CSKA Moscow (20/31), Beşiktaş J.K. (3/5)
15	(Greece) Dimitris Salpingidis	23	67	0.34	1999-2015	PAOK FC (13/43), Panathinaikos F.C. (10/24)
18	(England) Martin Chivers	22	34	0.65	1971-1977	Tottenham Hotspur F.C.
18	(Germany) Jürgen Klinsmann	22	36	0.61	1988-1997	VfB Stuttgart (4/8), Inter Milan (3/13), FC Bayern Munich (15/14), UC Sampdoria (0/1)
18	(Netherlands) Dennis Bergkamp	22	42	0.52	1988-2000	AFC Ajax (9/21), Inter Milan (9/13), Arsenal F.C. (4/8)
18	(Germany) Karl-Heinz Rummenigge	22	49	0.45	1977-1988	FC Bayern Munich (13/22), Inter Milan (9/23), Servette FC (0/4)

== All-time top scorers (including qualifying rounds) ==
Rank	Player	Goal	Apps	Ratio	Years	Club (Goal/Match)
1	(Sweden) Henrik Larsson	40	56	0.71	1996-2009	Feyenoord (1/6), Celtic F.C. (27/35), Helsingborgs IF (12/15)
2	(Gabon) Pierre-Emerick Aubameyang	37	68	0.54	2009-2024	Lille OSC (0/9), Borussia Dortmund (11/14), Arsenal F.C. (14/26), FC Barcelona (2/6), Olympique de Marseille (10/13)
3	(Netherlands) Klaas-Jan Huntelaar	34	54	0.63	2004-2020	SC Heerenveen (5/13), AFC Ajax (11/17), FC Schalke 04 (18/24)
4	(Colombia) Alfredo Morelos	32	62	0.52	2016-2022	Helsingin Jalkapalloklubi (4/6), Rangers F.C. (28/56)
5	(Colombia) Radamel Falcao	31	35	0.89	2010-2021	FC Porto (18/16), Atlético Madrid (13/17), Galatasaray S.K. (0/2)
5	(Spain) Aritz Aduriz	31	47	0.66	2012-2018	Valencia CF (0/6), Athletic Bilbao (31/41)
7	(Germany) Dieter Müller	29	36	0.81	1973-1983	1. FC Köln (25/31), VfB Stuttgart (1/2), FC Girondins de Bordeaux (3/3)
8	(Bosnia and Herzegovina) Edin Džeko	28	60	0.47	2003-2025	FK Željezničar Sarajevo (0/1), VfL Wolfsburg (5/14), Manchester City F.C. (3/7), AS Roma (17/26), Fenerbahçe S.K. (3/12)
9	(Brazil) Vágner Love	27	44	0.61	2005-2021	PFC CSKA Moscow (20/32), Beşiktaş J.K. (4/8), FC Kairat (3/4)
9	(Georgia (country)) Shota Arveladze	27	45	0.6	1994-2007	FC Dinamo Tbilisi (2/4), Trabzonspor (4/4), AFC Ajax (10/13), Rangers F.C. (2/7), AZ Alkmaar (9/17)
9	(Belgium) Romelu Lukaku	27	46	0.59	2009-2024	RSC Anderlecht (5/18), Everton F.C. (8/9), Inter Milan (7/6), AS Roma (7/13)
9	(Portugal) Bruno Fernandes	27	58	0.47	2018-2025	Sporting CP (11/19), Manchester United F.C. (16/39)
9	(France) Alexandre Lacazette	27	62	0.44	2012-2025	Olympique Lyonnais (14/35), Arsenal F.C. (13/27)
14	(Israel) Mu'nas Dabbur	26	57	0.46	2011-2021	Maccabi Tel Aviv F.C. (1/12), FC Red Bull Salzburg (16/30), Grasshopper Club Zurich (0/2), Sevilla FC (3/6), TSG 1899 Hoffenheim (6/7)
14	(France) Kevin Gameiro	26	57	0.46	2005-2019	RC Strasbourg Alsace (2/3), Paris Saint-Germain F.C. (1/7), Sevilla FC (18/34), Atlético Madrid (2/5), Valencia CF (3/8)
14	(Portugal) Ricardo Horta	26	82	0.32	2016-2026	S.C. Braga (26/82)
17	(England) Jermain Defoe	25	41	0.61	2006-2020	Tottenham Hotspur F.C. (20/29), Portsmouth F.C. (2/4), Rangers F.C. (3/8)
17	(Italy) Alessandro Altobelli	25	58	0.43	1977-1989	Inter Milan (21/50), Juventus FC (4/8)
17	(Croatia) Mladen Petrić	25	72	0.35	2001-2015	Grasshopper Club Zurich (1/11), FC Basel (8/26), Hamburger SV (15/27), Panathinaikos F.C. (1/8)
20	(Peru) Claudio Pizarro	24	33	0.73	1999-2010	SV Werder Bremen (24/33)
20	(Netherlands) Ricky van Wolfswinkel	24	57	0.42	2010-2025	FC Utrecht (8/12), Sporting CP (9/20), AS Saint-Étienne (1/6), FC Basel (4/9), FC Twente (2/10)
20	(Colombia) Carlos Bacca	24	60	0.4	2012-2021	Club Brugge KV (3/7), Sevilla FC (14/31), Villarreal CF (7/22)
20	(North Macedonia) Ivan Trichkovski	24	67	0.36	2005-2022	FK Vardar (1/6), FK Rabotnicki (0/6), Red Star Belgrade (0/2), APOEL FC (1/5), Club Brugge KV (1/3), Legia Warsaw (0/6), AEK Larnaca FC (21/39)

== Top scorers by country ==
Rank	Country	Title	Season
1	Germany	10	1971-72, 1972-73, 1974-75, 1979-80, 1979-80, 1985-86, 1989-90, 1990-91, 1994-95, 1995-96
2	Netherlands	7	1972-73, 1973-74, 1975-76, 1977-78, 1986-87, 1993-94, 2001-02
2	Brazil	7	1986-87, 2002-03, 2003-04, 2008-09, 2014-15, 2016-17, 2025-26
4	Spain	5	2000-01, 2013-14, 2015-16, 2017-18, 2020-21
5	England	4	1976-77, 2004-05, 2021-22, 2022-23
5	Italy	4	1996-97, 1998-99, 2007-08, 2017-18
7	Denmark	3	1978-79, 1987-88, 2024-25
7	Hungary	3	1983-84, 1984-85, 1987-88
7	France	3	1992-93, 1997-98, 2018-19
7	Serbia and Montenegro	3	1998-99, 1999-00, 2000-01
7	Portugal	3	2019-20, 2020-21, 2024-25
12	(Socialist Federal Republic of Yugoslavia) Yugoslavia	2	1982-83, 1984-85
12	East Germany	2	1988-89, 1989-90
12	Colombia	2	2010-11, 2011-12
15	Switzerland	1	1977-78
15	Scotland	1	1980-81
15	Sweden	1	1981-82
15	Finland	1	1986-87
15	Greece	1	1987-88
15	Wales	1	1991-92
15	Poland	1	2000-01
15	Argentina	1	2005-06
15	Uruguay	1	2006-07
15	Russia	1	2007-08
15	Peru	1	2009-10
15	Paraguay	1	2009-10
15	Czech Republic	1	2012-13
15	Belgium	1	2014-15
15	Bosnia and Herzegovina	1	2016-17
15	Turkey	1	2020-21
15	Nigeria	1	2022-23
15	Gabon	1	2023-24
15	Morocco	1	2024-25
15	Serbia	1	2025-26

== Top scorers by season ==
Season	Player	Goal
1971-72	(Germany) Ludwig Bründl	10
1972-73	(Netherlands) Jan Jeuring	12
1972-73	(Germany) Jupp Heynckes	12
1973-74	(Netherlands) Lex Schoenmaker	9
1974-75	(Germany) Jupp Heynckes	11
1975-76	(Netherlands) Ruud Geels	10
1976-77	(England) Stan Bowles	11
1977-78	(Netherlands) Gerrie Deijkers	8
1977-78	(Switzerland) Raimondo Ponte	8
1978-79	(Denmark) Allan Simonsen	9
1979-80	(Germany) Dieter Hoeneß	7
1979-80	(Germany) Harald Nickel	7
1980-81	(Scotland) John Wark	14
1981-82	(Sweden) Torbjörn Nilsson	9
1982-83	(Socialist Federal Republic of Yugoslavia) Zoran Filipović	8
1983-84	(Hungary) Tibor Nyilasi	9
1984-85	(Hungary) József Szabó	7
1984-85	(Socialist Federal Republic of Yugoslavia) Edin Bahtić	7
1985-86	(Germany) Klaus Allofs	9
1986-87	(Finland) Jari Rantanen	5
1986-87	(Netherlands) Peter Houtman	5
1986-87	(Brazil) Paulinho Cascavel	5
1987-88	(Hungary) Kálmán Kovács	6
1987-88	(Denmark) Kenneth Brylle	6
1987-88	(Greece) Dimitris Saravakos	6
1988-89	(East Germany) Torsten Gütschow	7
1989-90	(Germany) Karl-Heinz Riedle	6
1989-90	(East Germany) Falko Götz	6
1990-91	(Germany) Rudi Völler	10

Season	Player	Goal
1991-92	(Wales) Dean Saunders	9
1992-93	(France) Gérald Baticle	8
1993-94	(Netherlands) Dennis Bergkamp	8
1994-95	(Germany) Ulf Kirsten	10
1995-96	(Germany) Jürgen Klinsmann	15
1996-97	(Italy) Maurizio Ganz	8
1997-98	(France) Stéphane Guivarc'h	7
1998-99	(Italy) Enrico Chiesa	8
1998-99	(Serbia and Montenegro) Darko Kovačević	8
1999-00	(Serbia and Montenegro) Darko Kovačević	10
2000-01	(Poland) Marcin Kuźba	6
2000-01	(Serbia and Montenegro) Goran Drulić	6
2000-01	(Spain) Javi Moreno	6
2001-02	(Netherlands) Pierre van Hooijdonk	8
2002-03	(Brazil) Derlei	12
2003-04	(Brazil) Sonny Anderson	7
2004-05	(England) Alan Shearer	11
2005-06	(Argentina) Matías Emilio Delgado	7
2006-07	(Uruguay) Walter Pandiani	11
2007-08	(Russia) Pavel Pogrebnyak	10
2007-08	(Italy) Luca Toni	10
2008-09	(Brazil) Vágner Love	11
2009-10	(Peru) Claudio Pizarro	9
2009-10	(Paraguay) Óscar Cardozo	9
2010-11	(Colombia) Radamel Falcao	17

Season	Player	Goal
2011-12	(Colombia) Radamel Falcao	12
2012-13	(Czech Republic) Libor Kozák	8
2013-14	(Spain) Jonathan Soriano	8
2014-15	(Brazil) Alan	8
2014-15	(Belgium) Romelu Lukaku	8
2015-16	(Spain) Aritz Aduriz	10
2016-17	(Bosnia and Herzegovina) Edin Džeko	8
2016-17	(Brazil) Giuliano de Paula	8
2017-18	(Spain) Aritz Aduriz	8
2017-18	(Italy) Ciro Immobile	8
2018-19	(France) Olivier Giroud	11
2019-20	(Portugal) Bruno Fernandes	8
2020-21	(Turkey) Yusuf Yazıcı	7
2020-21	(Spain) Borja Mayoral	7
2020-21	(Portugal) Pizzi	7
2021-22	(England) James Tavernier	7
2022-23	(Nigeria) Victor Boniface	6
2022-23	(England) Marcus Rashford	6
2023-24	(Gabon) Pierre-Emerick Aubameyang	10
2024-25	(Denmark) Kasper Høgh	7
2024-25	(Morocco) Ayoub El Kaabi	7
2024-25	(Portugal) Bruno Fernandes	7
2025-26	(Brazil) Igor Jesus	7
2025-26	(Serbia) Petar Stanić	7

== See also ==
- List of UEFA Champions League top scorers
- List of UEFA Cup Winners' Cup top scorers
- List of UEFA Europa League hat-tricks
