= List of UEFA Europa League hat-tricks =

Since the rebranding of the UEFA Cup as the UEFA Europa League in 2009, 70 different players from 35 countries have scored three or more goals in a single match (a hat-trick) on 86 occasions, representing 56 clubs from 19 countries. The first to do so was Liédson for Sporting CP against Dutch club Heerenveen on 17 September 2009, the first matchday of the new competition.

Five players have gone on to score more than three goals in a match, with Radamel Falcao, Edinson Cavani, Willian José and Patson Daka managing four goals, and Athletic Bilbao's Aritz Aduriz scoring all five in a 5–3 win over Genk on 3 November 2016. Falcao and Pierre-Emerick Aubameyang have scored the most hat-tricks in the Europa League, with three each; all of Falcao's hat-tricks came for Porto in their victorious 2010–11 campaign, while Aubameyang is the only player to score a hat-trick for three different clubs (Borussia Dortmund, Arsenal and Marseille). Klaas-Jan Huntelaar and Diogo Jota are the only players to score hat-tricks in consecutive appearances.

Daka holds the record for the quickest hat-trick in the competition, with just nine minutes between his first and third goals for Leicester City against Spartak Moscow on 20 October 2021. (Note: Daka scored his first goal in the 45th minute, at the end of the first half, and his third in the 54th; although these two times are nine minutes apart, this does not take first-half injury time into account.) João Félix is the youngest scorer of a Europa League hat-trick, with his three goals against Eintracht Frankfurt on 11 April 2019 coming at the age of 19 years and 152 days. Elvis Manu is the only player to have scored a hat-trick in a match his team lost, having done so in Ludogorets Razgrad's 4–3 loss to LASK on 29 October 2020. Ademola Lookman became the first player to score a hat-trick in the Europa League era final, having done so for Atalanta against Bayer Leverkusen on 22 May 2024.

The season with the most hat-tricks was 2014–15, with twelve.

== Hat-tricks ==
As of 15 October 2026

Key
^{4}	Player scored four goals
^{5}	Player scored five goals
	Player's team lost the match
	Player's team drew the match
()	Number of times player scored a hat-trick (only for players with multiple hat-tricks)

Player	For	Against	Result	Date	Ref.
(Portugal) Liédson	(Portugal) Sporting CP	(Netherlands) Heerenveen	3–2	17 September 2009	
(Peru) Claudio Pizarro	(Germany) Werder Bremen	(Netherlands) Twente	4–1	25 February 2010	
(Spain) David Villa	(Spain) Valencia	(Germany) Werder Bremen	4–4	18 March 2010	
(Germany) Patrick Helmes	(Germany) Bayer Leverkusen	(Norway) Rosenborg	4–0	16 September 2010	
(Russia) Aleksandr Kerzhakov	(Russia) Zenit Saint Petersburg	(Belgium) Anderlecht	3–1	16 September 2010	
(Latvia) Artjoms Rudņevs	(Poland) Lech Poznań	(Italy) Juventus	3–3	16 September 2010	
(Togo) Emmanuel Adebayor	(England) Manchester City	(Poland) Lech Poznań	3–1	21 October 2010	
(England) Steven Gerrard	(England) Liverpool	(Italy) Napoli	3–1	4 November 2010	
(Uruguay) Edinson Cavani (1)	(Italy) Napoli	(Netherlands) Utrecht	3–3	2 December 2010	
(Colombia) Radamel Falcao (1)	(Portugal) Porto	(Austria) Rapid Wien	3–1	2 December 2010	
(Colombia) Radamel Falcao (2)	(Portugal) Porto	(Russia) Spartak Moscow	5–1	7 April 2011	
(Colombia) Radamel Falcao (3)^{4}	(Portugal) Porto	(Spain) Villarreal	5–1	28 April 2011	
(Argentina) Matías Suárez	(Belgium) Anderlecht	(Greece) AEK Athens	4–1	15 September 2011	
(Netherlands) Klaas-Jan Huntelaar (1)	(Germany) Schalke 04	(Czech Republic) Viktoria Plzeň	3–1	23 February 2012	
(Netherlands) Klaas-Jan Huntelaar (2)	(Germany) Schalke 04	(Netherlands) Twente	4–1	15 March 2012	
(Chile) Eduardo Vargas	(Italy) Napoli	(Sweden) AIK	4–0	20 September 2012	
(Paraguay) Raúl Bobadilla (1)	(Switzerland) Young Boys	(Italy) Udinese	3–1	25 October 2012	
(Uruguay) Edinson Cavani (2)^{4}	(Italy) Napoli	(Ukraine) Dnipro Dnipropetrovsk	4–2	8 November 2012	
(England) Jermain Defoe	(England) Tottenham Hotspur	(Slovenia) Maribor	3–1	8 November 2012	
(Slovenia) Tim Matavž	(Netherlands) PSV Eindhoven	(Italy) Napoli	3–1	6 December 2012	
(Czech Republic) Libor Kozák	(Italy) Lazio	(Germany) VfB Stuttgart	3–1	14 March 2013	
(Spain) Jonathan Soriano (1)	(Austria) Red Bull Salzburg	(Sweden) Elfsborg	4–0	19 September 2013	
(Turkey) Olcan Adın	(Turkey) Trabzonspor	(Cyprus) Apollon Limassol	4–2	28 November 2013	
(Spain) Roberto Soldado	(England) Tottenham Hotspur	(Russia) Anzhi Makhachkala	4–1	12 December 2013	
(Spain) Paco Alcácer	(Spain) Valencia	(Switzerland) Basel	5–0	10 April 2014	
(Greece) Stefanos Athanasiadis	(Greece) PAOK	(Belarus) Dinamo Minsk	6–1	18 September 2014	
(Romania) Claudiu Keșerü (1)	(Romania) FCSB	(Denmark) AaB	6–0	18 September 2014	
(Algeria) Hillal Soudani	(Croatia) Dinamo Zagreb	(Romania) Astra Giurgiu	5–1	18 September 2014	
(Brazil) Alan	(Austria) Red Bull Salzburg	(Croatia) Dinamo Zagreb	4–2	23 October 2014	
(England) Harry Kane	(England) Tottenham Hotspur	(Greece) Asteras Tripolis	5–1	23 October 2014	
(Croatia) Andrej Kramarić	(Croatia) Rijeka	(Netherlands) Feyenoord	3–1	23 October 2014	
(Netherlands) Jonathan de Guzmán	(Italy) Napoli	(Switzerland) Young Boys	3–0	6 November 2014	
(Israel) Lior Refaelov	(Belgium) Club Brugge	(Denmark) Copenhagen	4–0	6 November 2014	
(Spain) Jonathan Soriano (2)	(Austria) Red Bull Salzburg	(Croatia) Dinamo Zagreb	5–1	6 November 2014	
(Croatia) Marko Pjaca	(Croatia) Dinamo Zagreb	(Scotland) Celtic	4–3	11 December 2014	
(Belgium) Romelu Lukaku	(England) Everton	(Switzerland) Young Boys	4–1	19 February 2015	
(Argentina) Gonzalo Higuaín	(Italy) Napoli	(Russia) Dynamo Moscow	3–1	12 March 2015	
(Argentina) Franco Di Santo	(Germany) Schalke 04	(Greece) Asteras Tripolis	4–0	1 October 2015	
(Gabon) Pierre-Emerick Aubameyang (1)	(Germany) Borussia Dortmund	(Azerbaijan) Gabala	3–1	22 October 2015	
(Paraguay) Raúl Bobadilla (2)	(Germany) FC Augsburg	(Netherlands) AZ	4–1	5 November 2015	
(Argentina) Erik Lamela	(England) Tottenham Hotspur	(France) Monaco	4–1	10 December 2015	
(France) Guillaume Hoarau	(Switzerland) Young Boys	(Cyprus) APOEL	3–1	20 October 2016	
(Spain) Aritz Aduriz^{5}	(Spain) Athletic Bilbao	(Belgium) Genk	5–3	3 November 2016	
(Bosnia and Herzegovina) Edin Džeko (1)	(Italy) Roma	(Czech Republic) Viktoria Plzeň	4–1	24 November 2016	
(Bosnia and Herzegovina) Edin Džeko (2)	(Italy) Roma	(Spain) Villarreal	4–0	16 February 2017	
(Sweden) Zlatan Ibrahimović	(England) Manchester United	(France) Saint-Étienne	3–0	16 February 2017	
(France) Nabil Fekir	(France) Lyon	(Netherlands) AZ	7–1	23 February 2017	
(Germany) Lars Stindl	(Germany) Borussia Mönchengladbach	(Italy) Fiorentina	4–2	23 February 2017	
(Portugal) André Silva	(Italy) Milan	Austria Wien	5–1	14 September 2017	
(Portugal) Manuel Fernandes (1)	(Russia) Lokomotiv Moscow	(Czech Republic) Fastav Zlín	3–0	28 September 2017	
(Argentina) Emiliano Rigoni	(Russia) Zenit Saint Petersburg	(Norway) Rosenborg	3–1	19 October 2017	
(Brazil) Willian José^{4}	(Spain) Real Sociedad	(North Macedonia) Vardar	6–0	19 October 2017	
(Brazil) Júnior Moraes	(Ukraine) Dynamo Kyiv	(Serbia) Partizan	4–1	7 December 2017	
(Portugal) Manuel Fernandes (2)	(Russia) Lokomotiv Moscow	(France) Nice	3–2	22 February 2018	
(Italy) Ciro Immobile	(Italy) Lazio	(Romania) FCSB	5–1	22 February 2018	
(England) Ruben Loftus-Cheek	(England) Chelsea	(Belarus) BATE Borisov	3–1	25 October 2018	
(Japan) Takumi Minamino	(Austria) Red Bull Salzburg	(Norway) Rosenborg	5–2	8 November 2018	
(France) Olivier Giroud	(England) Chelsea	(Ukraine) Dynamo Kyiv	5–0	14 March 2019	
(Portugal) João Félix	(Portugal) Benfica	(Germany) Eintracht Frankfurt	4–2	11 April 2019	
(Gabon) Pierre-Emerick Aubameyang (2)	(England) Arsenal	(Spain) Valencia	4–2	9 May 2019	
(Romania) Claudiu Keșerü (2)	(Bulgaria) Ludogorets Razgrad	(Russia) CSKA Moscow	5–1	19 September 2019	
(Spain) Munir	(Spain) Sevilla	(Luxembourg) F91 Dudelange	5–2	7 November 2019	
(Portugal) Diogo Jota (1)	(England) Wolverhampton Wanderers	(Turkey) Beşiktaş	4–0	12 December 2019	
(Portugal) Diogo Jota (2)	(England) Wolverhampton Wanderers	(Spain) Espanyol	4–0	20 February 2020	
(Japan) Daichi Kamada	(Germany) Eintracht Frankfurt	(Austria) Red Bull Salzburg	4–1	20 February 2020	
(Argentina) Jonathan Calleri	(Spain) Espanyol	(England) Wolverhampton Wanderers	3–2	27 February 2020	
(Uruguay) Darwin Núñez	(Portugal) Benfica	(Poland) Lech Poznań	4–2	22 October 2020	
(Turkey) Yusuf Yazıcı (1)	(France) Lille	(Czech Republic) Sparta Prague	4–1	22 October 2020	
(Austria) Michael Liendl	(Austria) Wolfsberger AC	(Netherlands) Feyenoord	4–1	29 October 2020	
(Netherlands) Elvis Manu	(Bulgaria) Ludogorets Razgrad	(Austria) LASK	3–4	29 October 2020	
(Czech Republic) Lukáš Juliš	(Czech Republic) Sparta Prague	(Scotland) Celtic	4–1	5 November 2020	
(Turkey) Yusuf Yazıcı (2)	(France) Lille	(Italy) Milan	3–0	5 November 2020	
(Croatia) Mislav Oršić	(Croatia) Dinamo Zagreb	(England) Tottenham Hotspur	3–0	18 March 2021	
(Zambia) Patson Daka^{4}	(England) Leicester City	(Russia) Spartak Moscow	4–3	20 October 2021	
(Portugal) Vitinha	(Portugal) Braga	(Belgium) Union Saint-Gilloise	3–3	13 October 2022	
(Germany) Kevin Volland	(France) Monaco	(Serbia) Red Star Belgrade	4–1	3 November 2022	
(Argentina) Ángel Di María	(Italy) Juventus	(France) Nantes	3–0	23 February 2023	
(Italy) Vincenzo Grifo	(Germany) SC Freiburg	(Serbia) TSC	3–1	26 October 2023	
(Austria) Michael Gregoritsch	(Germany) SC Freiburg	(Greece) Olympiacos	5–0	30 November 2023	
(Gabon) Pierre-Emerick Aubameyang (3)	(France) Marseille	(Netherlands) Ajax	4–3	30 November 2023	
(France) Benjamin Bourigeaud	(France) Rennes	(Italy) Milan	3–2	22 February 2024	
(Nigeria) Ademola Lookman	(Italy) Atalanta	(Germany) Bayer Leverkusen	3–0	22 May 2024	
(Portugal) Bruno Fernandes	(England) Manchester United	(Spain) Real Sociedad	4–1	13 March 2025	
(Morocco) Anass Zaroury	(Greece) Panathinaikos	(Switzerland) Young Boys	4–1	25 September 2025	
(Serbia) Petar Stanić	(Bulgaria) Ludogorets Razgrad	(Spain) Celta Vigo	3–2	27 November 2025	
(France) Corentin Tolisso	(France) Lyon	(Israel) Maccabi Tel Aviv	6–0	27 November 2025	
(Brazil) Talisca	(Turkey) Fenerbahçe	(Norway) Brann	4–0	11 December 2025	
(Italy) Alphadjo Cisse	(Italy) Milan	(Austria) Red Bull Salzburg	4–0	15 October 2026	

== Multiple hat-tricks ==
Eleven players have scored more than one hat-trick in the UEFA Europa League; Pierre-Emerick Aubameyang and Radamel Falcao are the only players to do so three times, and only Aubameyang has scored a hat-trick for three different clubs.

Rank	Player	Hat-tricks
1	(Gabon) Pierre-Emerick Aubameyang	3
1	(Colombia) Radamel Falcao	3
3	(Paraguay) Raúl Bobadilla	2
3	(Uruguay) Edinson Cavani	2
3	(Bosnia and Herzegovina) Edin Džeko	2
3	(Portugal) Manuel Fernandes	2
3	(Netherlands) Klaas-Jan Huntelaar	2
3	(Portugal) Diogo Jota	2
3	(Romania) Claudiu Keșerü	2
3	(Spain) Jonathan Soriano	2
3	(Turkey) Yusuf Yazıcı	2

== Hat-tricks by nationality ==
The following table lists the number of hat-tricks scored by players from a single nation.

As of 15 October 2026

Europe League hat-tricks by nationality
Rank	Nation	Hat-tricks	Last hat-trick
1	Portugal	9	13 March 2025
2	Argentina	7	23 February 2023
2	Spain	7	7 November 2019
4	France	5	27 November 2025
5	Brazil	4	11 December 2025
5	England	4	25 October 2018
5	Netherlands	4	29 October 2020
8	Colombia	3	28 April 2011
8	Croatia	3	18 March 2021
8	Gabon	3	30 November 2023
8	Germany	3	3 November 2021
8	Italy	3	15 October 2026
8	Turkey	3	5 November 2020
8	Uruguay	3	22 October 2020
15	Austria	2	30 November 2023
15	Bosnia and Herzegovina	2	16 February 2017
15	Czech Republic	2	5 November 2020
15	Japan	2	20 February 2020
15	Paraguay	2	5 November 2015
15	Romania	2	19 September 2019
21	Algeria	1	18 September 2014
21	Belgium	1	19 February 2015
21	Chile	1	20 September 2012
21	Greece	1	18 September 2014
21	Israel	1	6 November 2014
21	Latvia	1	16 September 2010
21	Morocco	1	25 September 2025
21	Nigeria	1	22 May 2024
21	Peru	1	25 February 2010
21	Russia	1	16 September 2010
21	Serbia	1	27 November 2025
21	Slovenia	1	6 December 2012
21	Sweden	1	16 February 2017
21	Togo	1	21 October 2010
21	Zambia	1	20 October 2021

== Hat-tricks by club ==
The following table lists the number of hat-tricks scored by players from given club.

As of 11 December 2025

Europe League hat-tricks by club
Rank	Club	Hat-tricks	Last hat-trick
1	(Italy) Napoli	5	12 March 2015
2	(Austria) Red Bull Salzburg	4	8 November 2018
2	(England) Tottenham Hotspur	4	10 December 2015
4	(Bulgaria) Ludogorets Razgrad	3	27 November 2025
4	(Croatia) Dinamo Zagreb	3	18 March 2021
4	(Germany) Schalke 04	3	1 October 2015
4	(Portugal) Porto	3	28 April 2011
8	(England) Chelsea	2	14 March 2019
8	(England) Manchester United	2	13 March 2025
8	(England) Wolverhampton Wanderers	2	20 February 2020
8	(France) Lille	2	5 November 2020
8	(France) Lyon	2	27 November 2025
8	(Germany) SC Freiburg	2	30 November 2023
8	(Italy) Lazio	2	22 February 2018
8	(Italy) Roma	2	16 February 2017
8	(Portugal) Benfica	2	22 October 2020
8	(Russia) Lokomotiv Moscow	2	22 February 2018
8	(Russia) Zenit Saint Petersburg	2	19 October 2017
8	(Spain) Valencia	2	10 April 2014
8	(Switzerland) Young Boys	2	20 October 2016
20	(Austria) Wolfsberger AC	1	29 October 2020
20	(Belgium) Anderlecht	1	15 September 2011
20	(Belgium) Club Brugge	1	6 November 2014
20	(Czech Republic) Sparta Prague	1	5 November 2020
20	(Croatia) Rijeka	1	23 October 2014
20	(England) Arsenal	1	9 May 2019
20	(England) Everton	1	19 February 2015
20	(England) Leicester City	1	20 October 2021
20	(England) Liverpool	1	4 November 2010
20	(England) Manchester City	1	21 October 2010
20	(France) Marseille	1	30 November 2023
20	(France) Monaco	1	3 November 2022
20	(France) Rennes	1	22 February 2024
20	(Germany) FC Augsburg	1	5 November 2015
20	(Germany) Bayer Leverkusen	1	16 September 2010
20	(Germany) Borussia Dortmund	1	22 October 2015
20	(Germany) Borussia Mönchengladbach	1	23 February 2017
20	(Germany) Eintracht Frankfurt	1	20 February 2020
20	(Germany) Werder Bremen	1	25 February 2010
20	(Greece) Panathinaikos	1	25 September 2025
20	(Greece) PAOK	1	18 September 2014
20	(Italy) Atalanta	1	22 May 2024
20	(Italy) Milan	1	14 September 2017
20	(Italy) Juventus	1	23 February 2023
20	(Netherlands) PSV Eindhoven	1	6 December 2012
20	(Poland) Lech Poznań	1	16 September 2010
20	(Portugal) Braga	1	13 October 2022
20	(Portugal) Sporting CP	1	17 September 2009
20	(Romania) FCSB	1	18 September 2014
20	(Spain) Athletic Bilbao	1	3 November 2016
20	(Spain) Espanyol	1	27 February 2020
20	(Spain) Real Sociedad	1	19 October 2017
20	(Spain) Sevilla	1	7 November 2019
20	(Turkey) Fenerbahçe	1	11 December 2025
20	(Turkey) Trabzonspor	1	28 November 2013
20	(Ukraine) Dynamo Kyiv	1	7 December 2017

== See also ==
- UEFA Cup and Europa League records and statistics
- List of UEFA Cup and Europa League top scorers
- List of UEFA Conference League hat-tricks
- List of UEFA Champions League hat-tricks
