= List of UEFA Conference League hat-tricks =

The UEFA Conference League is an annual club football competition that has been serving as the third-tier of European club football since 2021. Since then, 10 players from 9 countries have scored a hat-trick on 11 occasions in the main stages of the competition. The first player to do so was Harry Kane for Tottenham Hotspur in the group stage against Slovenian club Mura. Nigerian footballer Gift Orban has scored the most hat-tricks in the competition, doing so twice for Belgian club Gent.

== Hat-tricks ==
As of 22 October 2026

Key
^{4}	Player scored four goals
^{5}	Player scored five goals
	Player's team lost the match
	Player's team drew the match
()	Number of times player scored a hat-trick (only for players with multiple hat-tricks)

Player	For	Against	Result	Date	Ref.
(England) Harry Kane	(England) Tottenham Hotspur	(Slovenia) Mura	5–1	30 September 2021	
(Italy) Nicolò Zaniolo	(Italy) Roma	(Norway) Bodø/Glimt	4–0	4 April 2022	
(Spain) José Luis Morales	(Spain) Villarreal	Austria Wien	5–0	6 October 2022	
(Nigeria) Gift Orban	(Belgium) Gent	(Turkey) İstanbul Başakşehir	4–1	9 March 2023	
(Nigeria) Gift Orban (2)	(Belgium) Gent	(Iceland) Breiðablik	3–2	9 November 2023	
(Sweden) Benjamin Nygren	(Denmark) Nordsjælland	(Turkey) Fenerbahçe	6–1	30 November 2023	
(Morocco) Ayoub El Kaabi	(Greece) Olympiacos	(England) Aston Villa	4–2	2 May 2024	
(Togo) Kévin Denkey	(Belgium) Cercle Brugge	(Switzerland) St. Gallen	6–2	3 October 2024	
(Spain) Marc Guiu	(England) Chelsea	(Republic of Ireland) Shamrock Rovers	5–1	19 December 2024	
(Croatia) Franko Kovačević	(Slovenia) Celje	(Greece) AEK Athens	3–1	2 October 2025	
(Poland) Bartosz Mazurek	(Poland) Jagiellonia Białystok	(Italy) Fiorentina	4–2 (a.e.t.)	26 February 2026	
(Norway) Noah Holm	(Norway) Brann	(Lithuania) Kauno Žalgiris	4–1	22 October 2026	

== Hat-tricks by nationality ==
The following table lists the number of hat-tricks scored by players from a single nation.

As of 22 October 2026

Conference League hat-tricks by nationality
Rank	Nation	Hat-tricks	Last hat-trick
1	Nigeria	2	9 November 2023
1	Spain	2	19 December 2024
3	Croatia	1	2 October 2025
3	England	1	30 September 2021
3	Italy	1	4 April 2022
3	Morocco	1	2 May 2024
3	Norway	1	22 October 2026
3	Poland	1	26 February 2026
3	Sweden	1	30 November 2023
3	Togo	1	3 October 2024

== Hat-tricks by club ==
The following table lists the number of hat-tricks scored by players from given club.

As of 22 October 2026

Conference League hat-tricks by club
Rank	Club	Hat-tricks	Last hat-trick
1	(Belgium) Gent	2	9 November 2023
2	(Belgium) Cercle Brugge	1	3 October 2024
2	(Denmark) Nordsjælland	1	30 November 2023
2	(England) Chelsea	1	19 December 2024
2	(England) Tottenham Hotspur	1	30 September 2021
2	(Greece) Olympiacos	1	2 May 2024
2	(Italy) Roma	1	4 April 2022
2	(Norway) Brann	1	22 October 2026
2	(Poland) Jagiellonia Białystok	1	26 February 2026
2	(Slovenia) Celje	1	2 October 2025
2	(Spain) Villarreal	1	6 October 2022

== See also ==
- List of UEFA Champions League hat-tricks
- List of UEFA Europa League hat-tricks
