= List of UEFA Champions League hat-tricks =

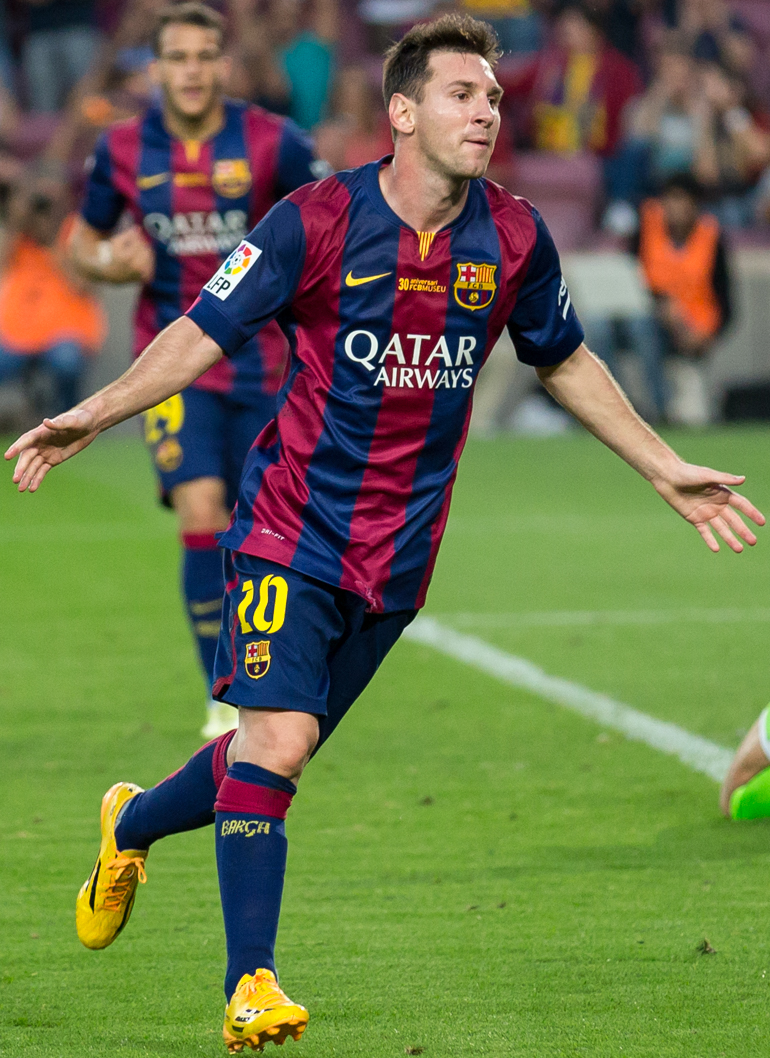
Lionel Messi jointly holds the record for most hat-tricks. He and Robert Lewandowski are also the only players to score four or more goals on multiple occasions.

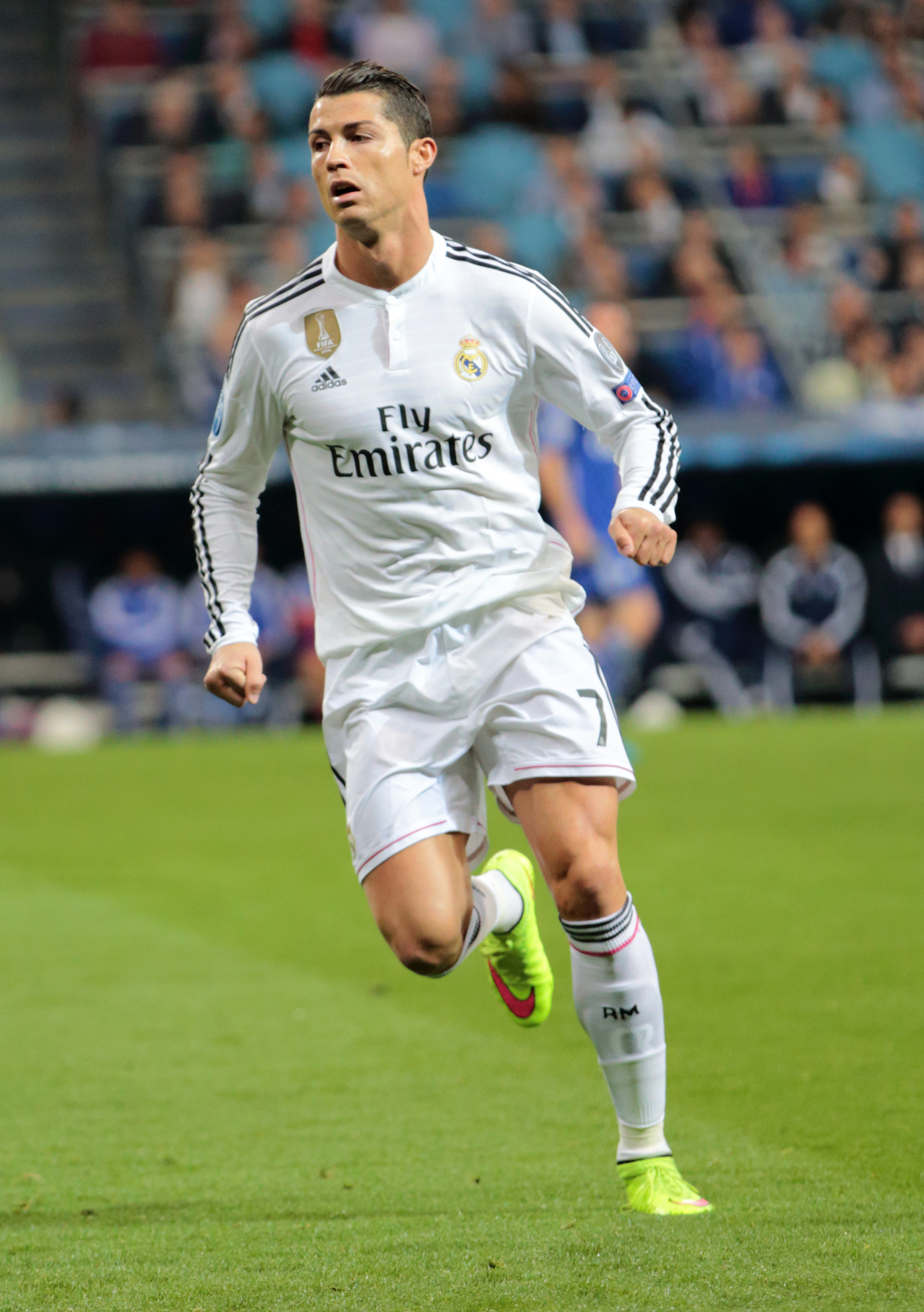
Cristiano Ronaldo is the joint record holder for the most Champions League hat-tricks with eight. He is the only player to score three hat-tricks in one season.

Since the rebranding of the European Champion Clubs' Cup as the UEFA Champions League in 1992, 124 different players from 38 countries have scored three goals or more in a single match (a hat-trick) on 173 occasions, representing 56 clubs from 17 leagues. The first player to achieve the feat was Juul Ellerman, who scored three times for PSV Eindhoven in a 6–0 victory over Žalgiris on 16 September 1992. Lionel Messi and Cristiano Ronaldo have scored three or more goals in a match eight times each in the Champions League, more than any other player, followed by Robert Lewandowski with six, and Kylian Mbappé, with five.

Twenty players have scored four or more goals in a match; of these, only Messi and Lewandowski have achieved this more than once. Only Messi (on 8 March 2012 against Bayer Leverkusen), Luiz Adriano (on 21 October 2014 against BATE Borisov) and Erling Haaland (on 14 March 2023 against RB Leipzig) have scored five goals in a match. Only Ronaldo (four times), Mbappé (three times), Messi, Lewandowski, and Benzema (twice each) have scored multiple hat-tricks in the knockout phase. Only Lewandowski has scored a hat-trick for three clubs (Borussia Dortmund, Bayern Munich and Barcelona), with a further fourteen players having scored hat-tricks for two clubs.

Ten players have scored a hat-trick on their competition debut: Marco van Basten, Faustino Asprilla, Yakubu, Wayne Rooney, Vincenzo Iaquinta, Grafite, Yacine Brahimi, Erling Haaland, Mislav Oršić, and Sébastien Haller; of those, only van Basten and Haller scored four goals. Seven players have scored hat-tricks in consecutive seasons: Adriano (2004–05 and 2005–06), Mario Gómez (2010–11 and 2011–12), Roberto Soldado (2011–12 and 2012–13), Ronaldo (2012–13 and 2013–14, and 2015–16 and 2016–17), Messi (2013–14 and 2014–15), Gabriel Jesus (2018–19 and 2019–20), Kylian Mbappé (2019–20 and 2020–21, and 2024–25 and 2025–26), and Lewandowski (2021–22 and 2022–23). Three players have scored hat-tricks in back-to-back games. Ronaldo, during his tenure with Real Madrid, netted hat-tricks against Bayern Munich on 18 April and Atlético Madrid on 2 May 2017, the shortest gap between hat-tricks at just 14 days. Luiz Adriano accomplished this feat for Shakhtar Donetsk on 21 October and 5 November 2014, with both hat-tricks coming against BATE Borisov in a span of 15 days. Benzema scored a hat-trick for Real against Paris Saint-Germain on 9 March 2022, and against Chelsea on 6 April. Ronaldo is the only player to score three hat-tricks in the same season, doing so during the 2015–16 season; he also scored two in the 2016–17. Six other players have scored multiple hat-tricks in the same season: Messi for Barcelona in both 2011–12 and 2016–17, Gómez for Bayern, also in 2011–12, Luiz Adriano for Shakhtar in 2013–14, Lewandowski for Bayern and Benzema for Madrid in 2021–22, and Mbappé for Madrid in 2025–26.

Mohamed Salah holds the record for the quickest hat-trick, netting three times for Liverpool against Rangers in six minutes and twelve seconds on 12 October 2022. Only six players have scored a hat-trick after coming on as a substitute: Uwe Rösler (1. FC Kaiserslautern), Joseba Llorente (Villarreal), Walter Pandiani (Deportivo La Coruña), Mbappé (Paris Saint-Germain), Marcus Rashford (Manchester United), and Salah (Liverpool). The youngest scorer of a hat-trick is Raúl, who scored a hat-trick for Real against Ferencváros, aged 18 years and 114 days, on 18 October 1995. Rooney is the youngest debut scorer of a hat-trick, aged 18 years and 340 days, when he scored for Manchester United against Fenerbahçe on 28 September 2004. The oldest scorer of a hat-trick is Benzema, who was 34 years and 108 days old when he scored three against Chelsea on 6 April 2022. The longest spell between two hat-tricks was achieved by Owen, who scored his first hat-trick on 22 October 2002 for Liverpool and his second over seven years later, on 8 December 2009 for Manchester United.

Twelve hat-tricks were scored in the 2024–25 season, the most in Champions League history, while none were scored in the 1994–95 and 2001–02 editions.

== Hat-tricks ==
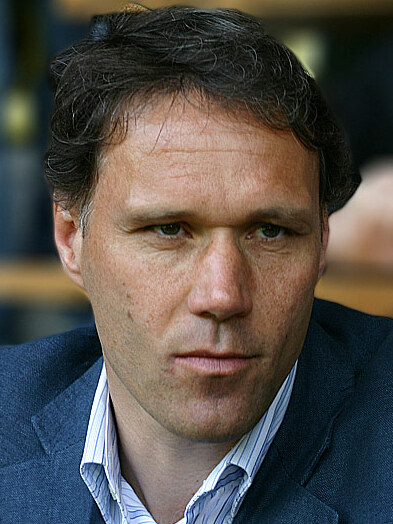
Marco van Basten (pictured in 2006) was the first player to score four goals in a match.

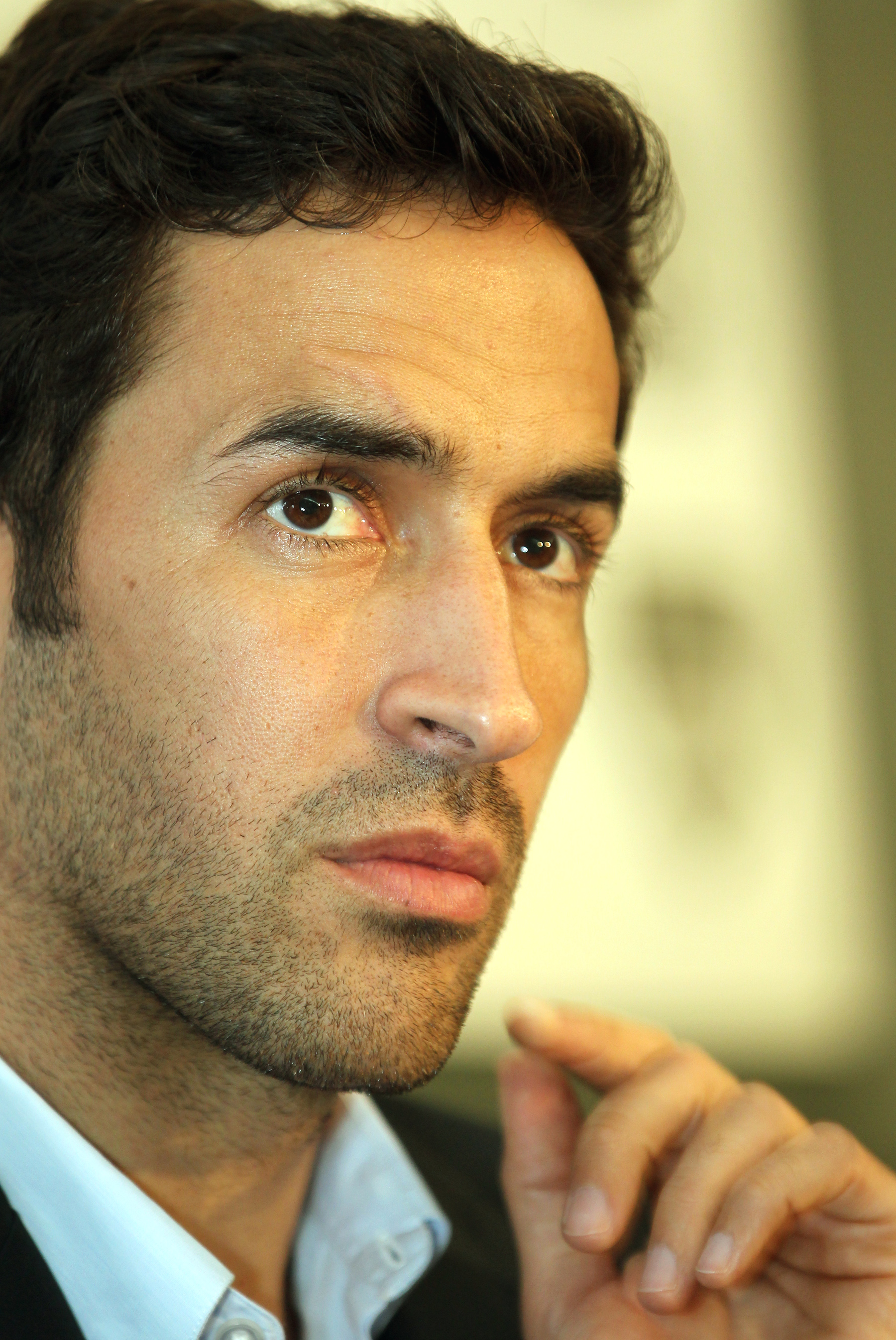
Raúl (pictured in 2012) scored a hat-trick aged 18 years and 114 days.

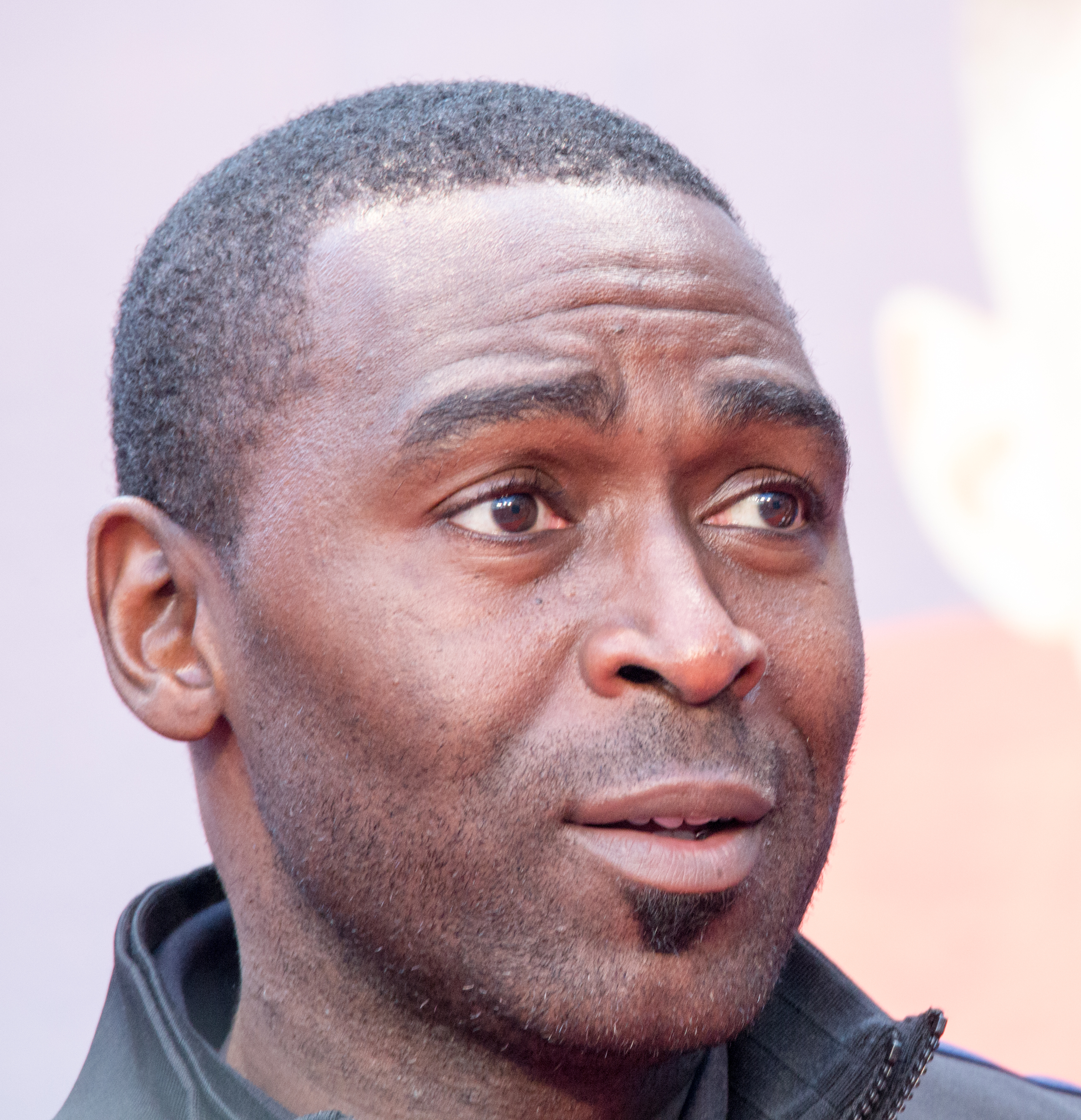
Andy Cole (pictured in 2014) was the first player to score two hat-tricks.

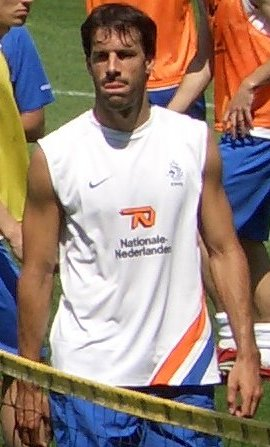
Ruud van Nistelrooy (pictured in 2006) scored hat-tricks for PSV Eindhoven and Manchester United.

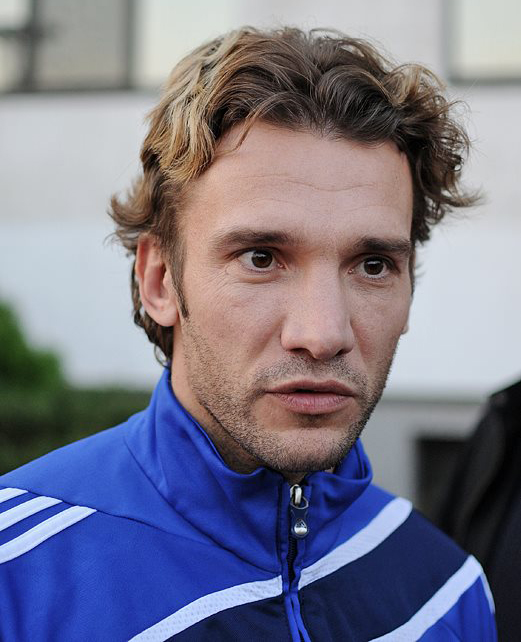
Andriy Shevchenko (pictured in 2009) scored hat-tricks for two teams, both in 4–0 victories.

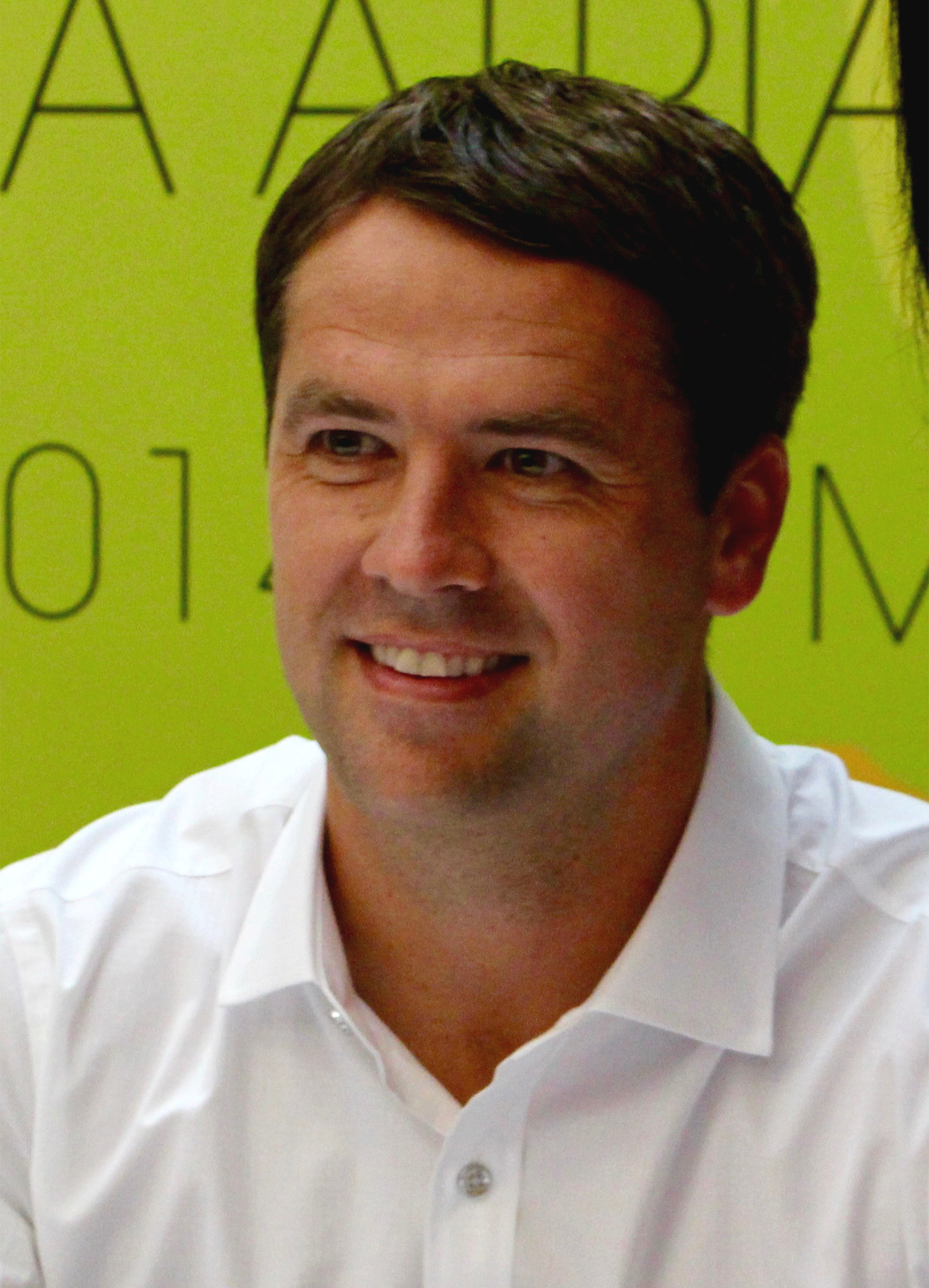
Michael Owen (pictured in 2014) scored hat-tricks eight years apart for rivals Liverpool and Manchester United.

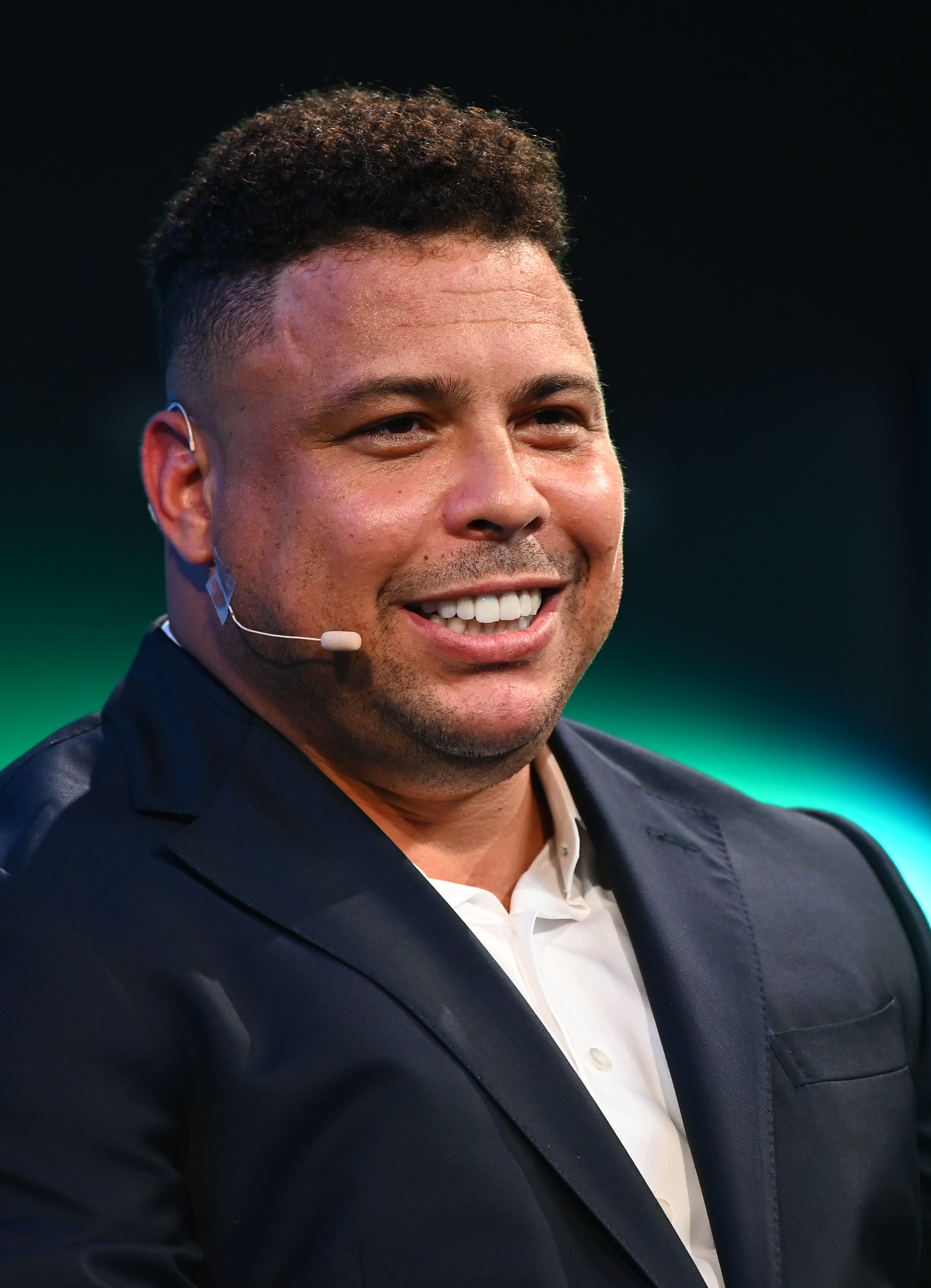
Ronaldo (pictured in 2019) was the first player to score a hat-trick and be on the losing side.

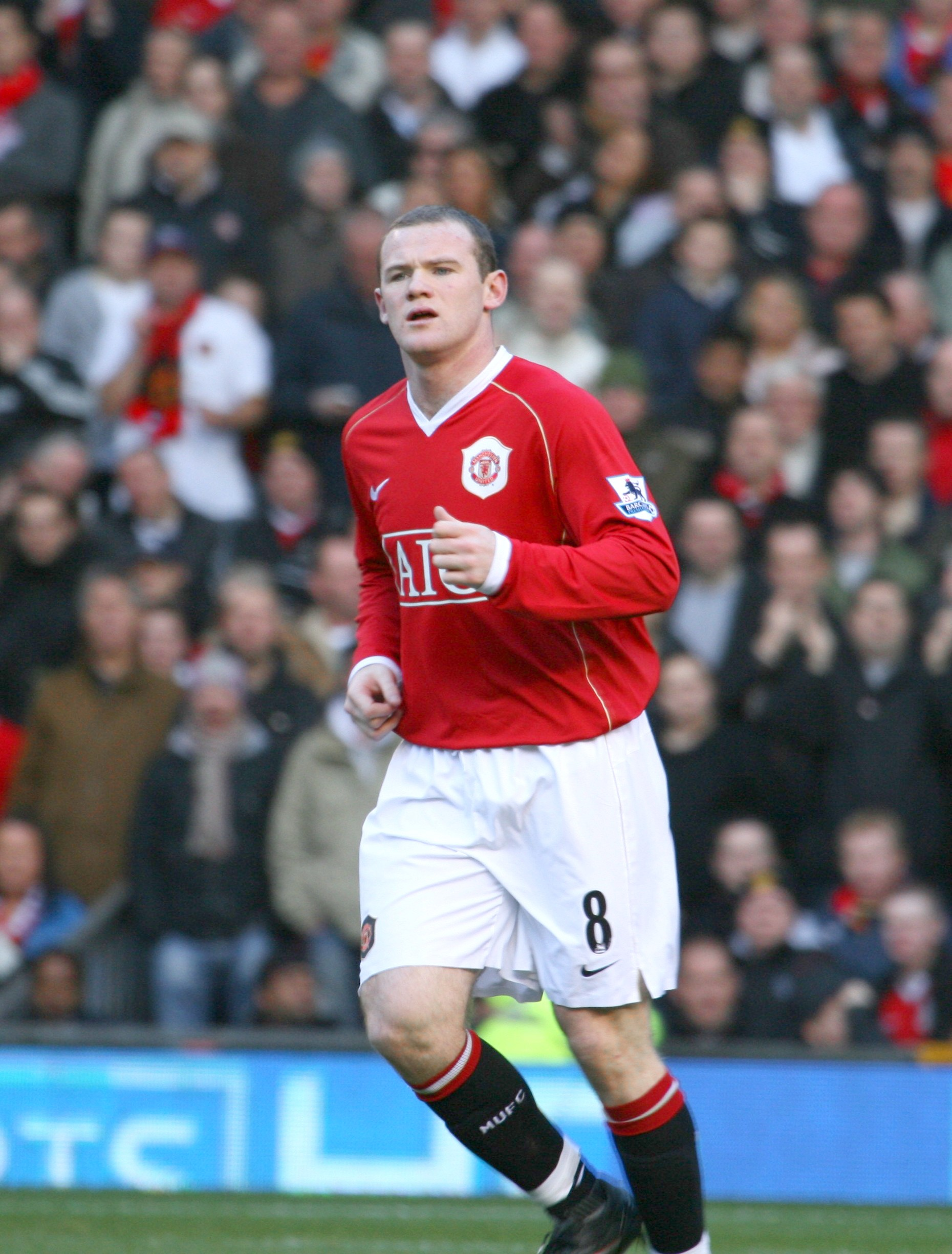
Wayne Rooney (pictured in 2006) scored a hat-trick on his Champions League and Manchester United debut.

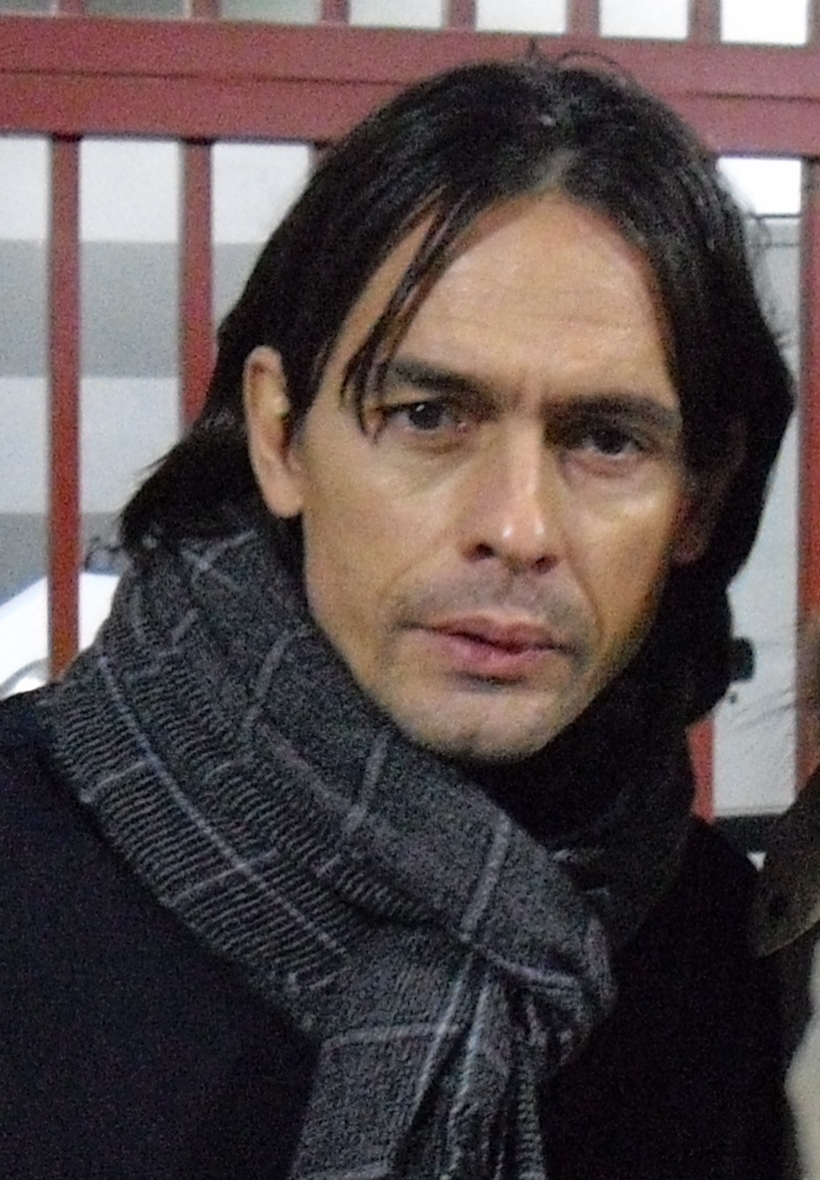
Filippo Inzaghi (pictured in 2011) was the first player to score three hat-tricks.

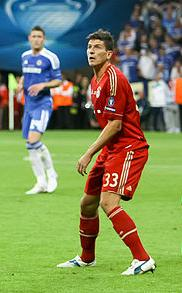
Mario Gómez (pictured in 2012) also scored three hat-tricks, all for Bayern Munich.

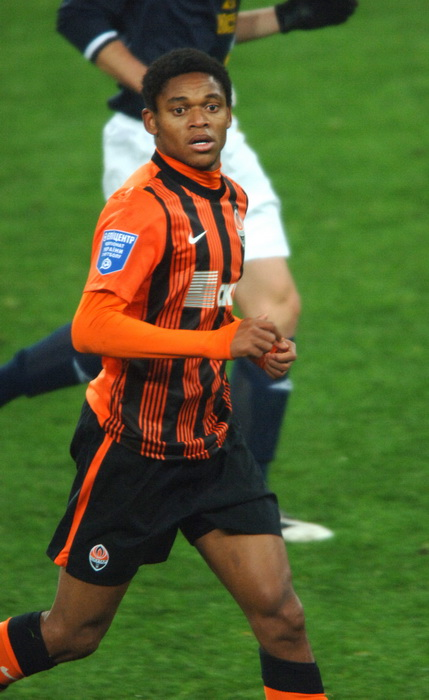
Luiz Adriano (pictured in 2011) was the first player to score back-to-back hat-tricks.

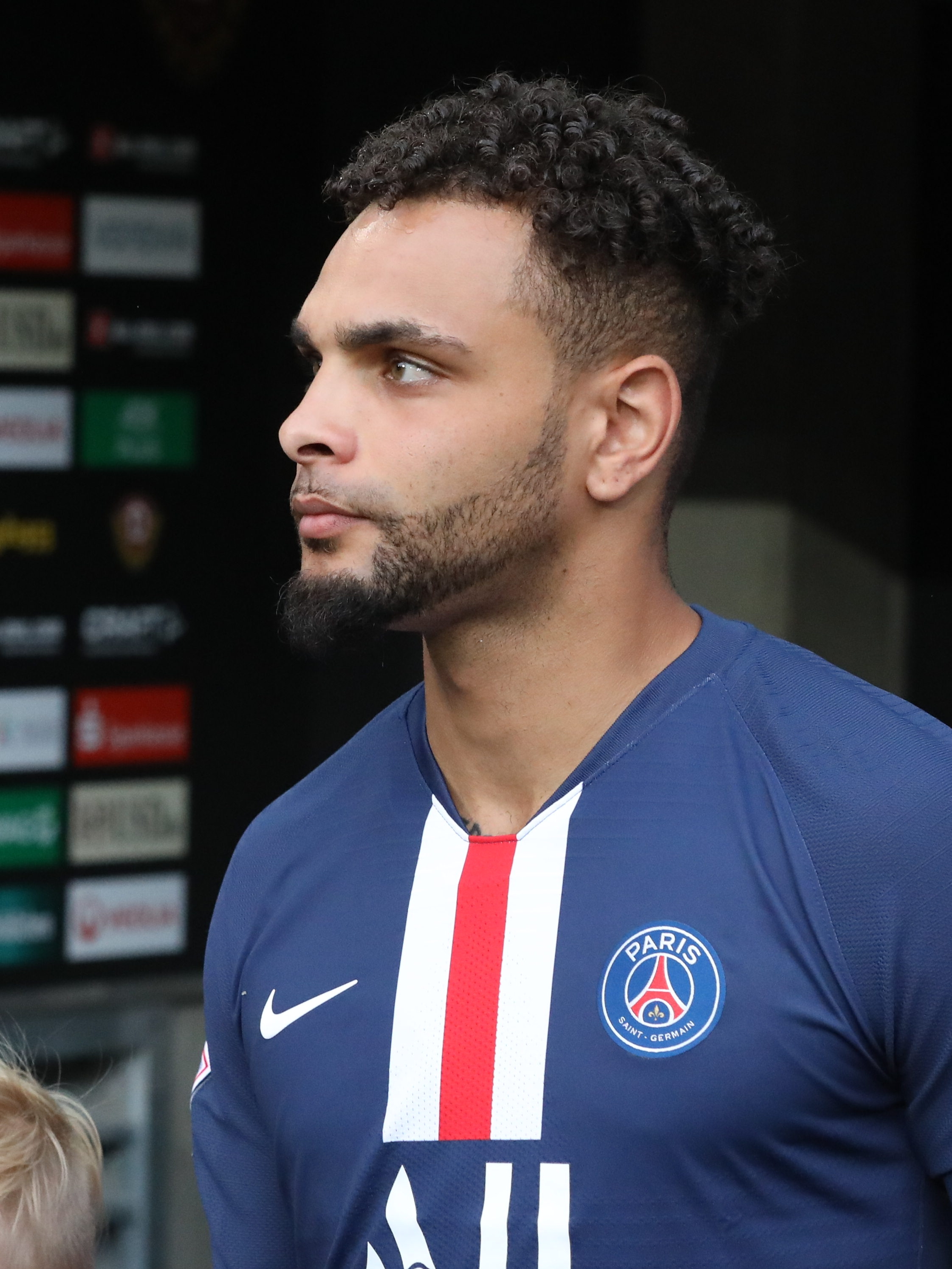
Layvin Kurzawa (pictured in 2019) is the only defender to score a hat-trick.

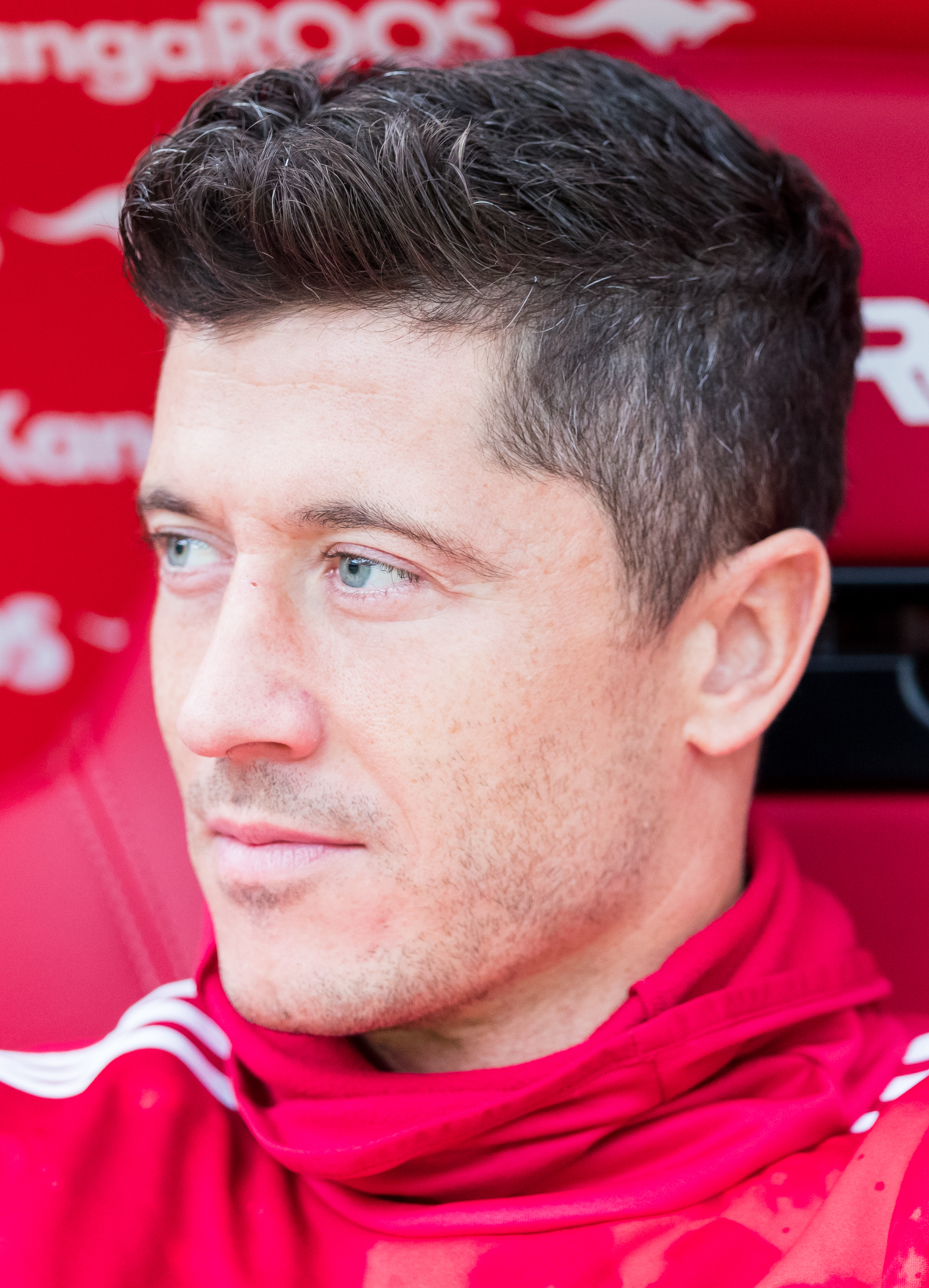
Robert Lewandowski (pictured in 2019) is the only player to score a hat-trick for three clubs.

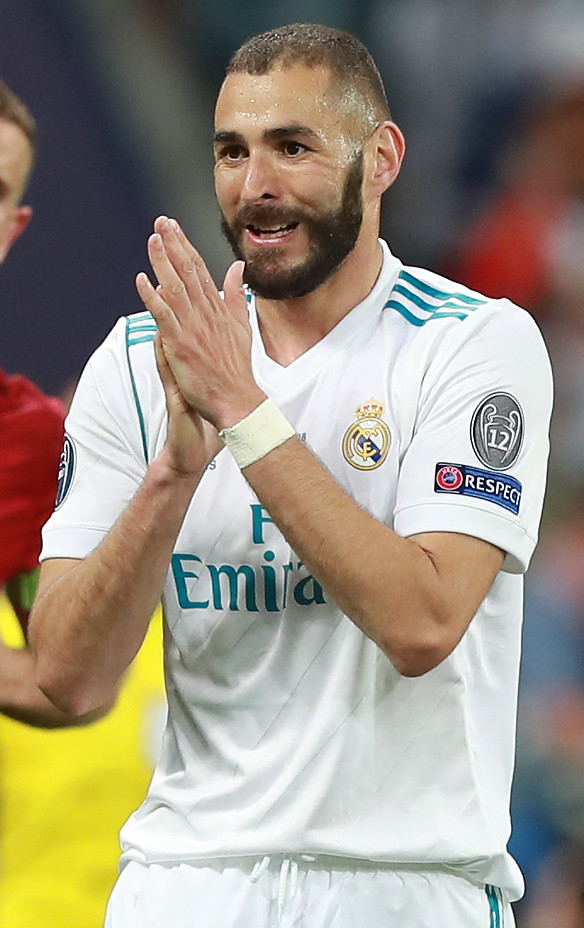
Karim Benzema (pictured in 2018) has scored four hat-tricks, including two in back-to-back matches.

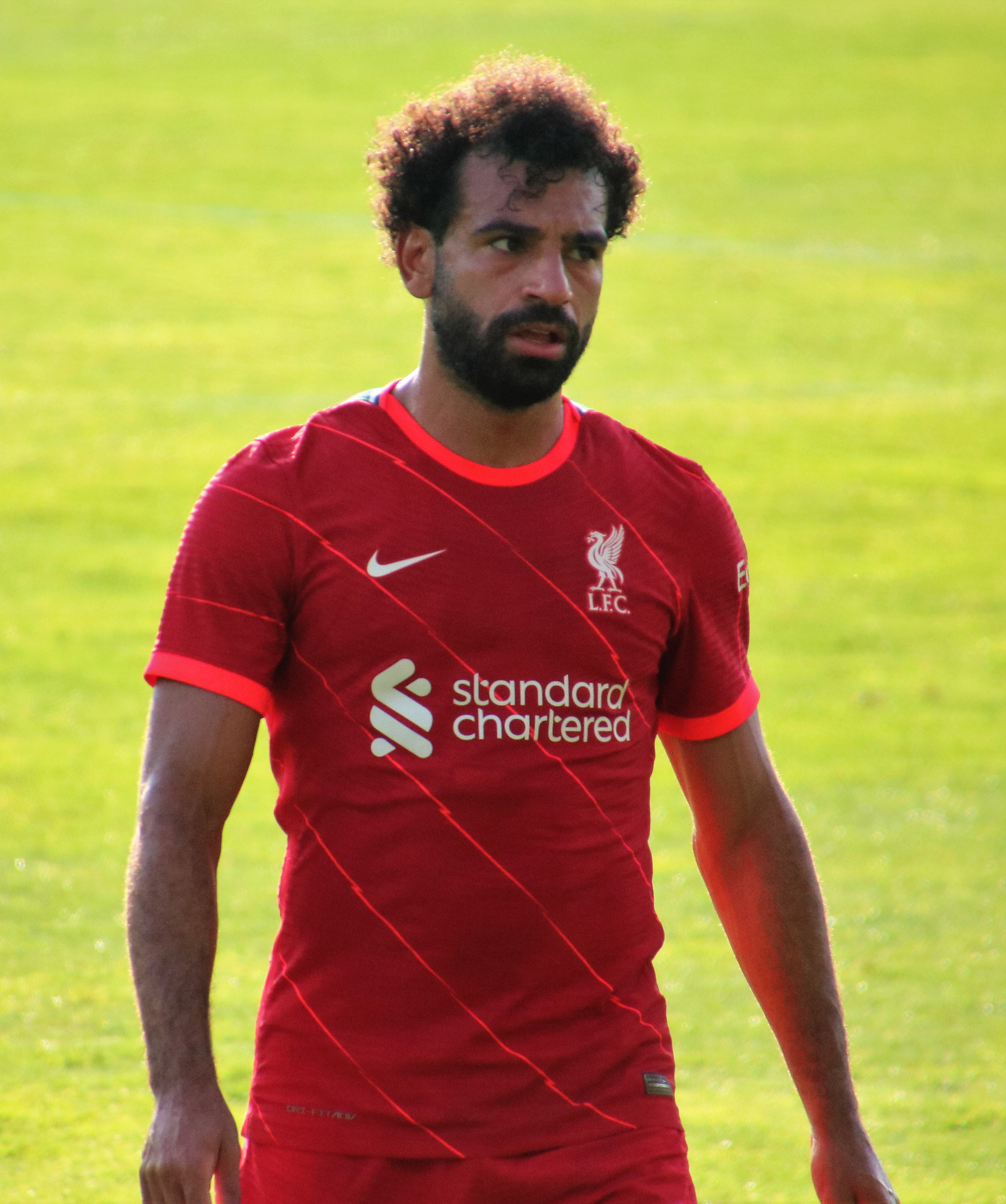
Mohamed Salah (pictured in 2021) holds the record for the fastest hat-trick, at 6 minutes and 12 seconds.

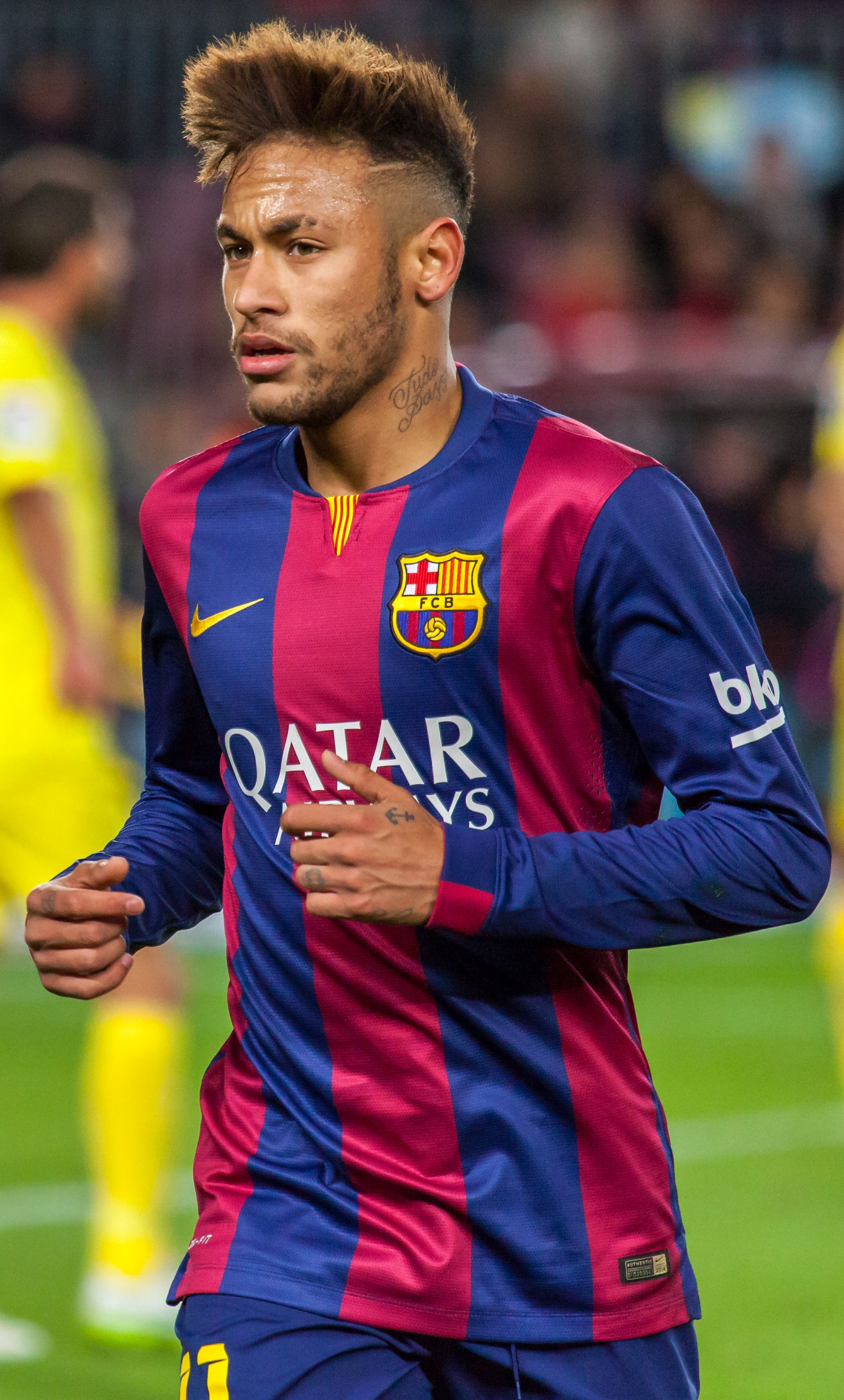
Neymar (pictured in 2015) has scored hat-tricks for Barcelona and Paris Saint-Germain.

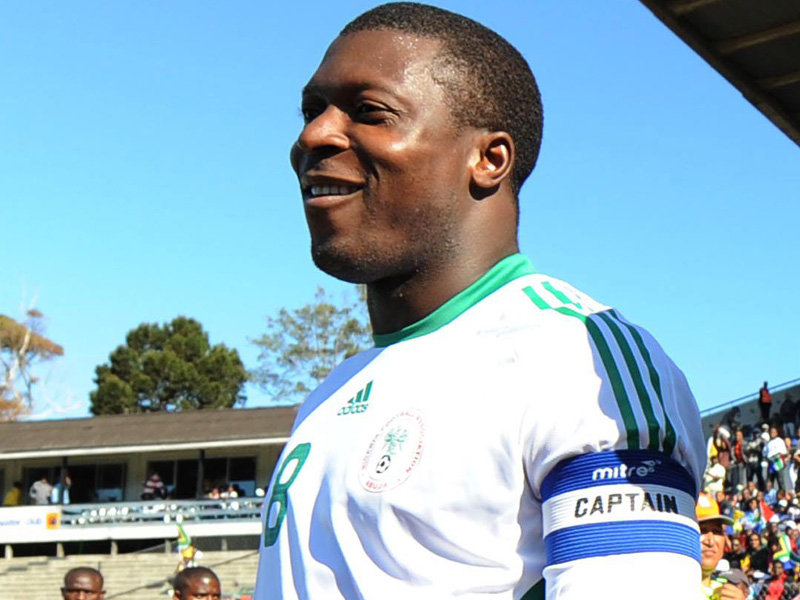
Yakubu (pictured in 2008) was the first African to score a hat-trick.

The Result column shows the player's team's score first.

As of 4 November 2026

Key
(X)	Number of times player scored a hat-trick (only for players with multiple hat-tricks)
^{4}	Player scored four goals
^{5}	Player scored five goals
	Player's team lost the match
	Player's team drew the match

Hat-tricks scored in the UEFA Champions League
Player	For	Against	Result	Date	Ref.
(Netherlands) Juul Ellerman	(Netherlands) PSV Eindhoven	(Lithuania) Žalgiris	6–0	16 September 1992	
(Brazil) Romário	(Netherlands) PSV Eindhoven	(Greece) AEK Athens	3–0	4 November 1992	
(Netherlands) Marco van Basten^{4}	(Italy) Milan	(Sweden) IFK Göteborg	4–0	25 November 1992	
(France) Franck Sauzée	(France) Marseille	(Russia) CSKA Moscow	6–0	17 March 1993	
(Germany) Bernd Hobsch	(Germany) Werder Bremen	(Belarus) Dinamo Minsk	5–2	16 September 1993	
(Belgium) Luc Nilis	(Belgium) Anderlecht	(Finland) HJK	3–0	29 September 1993	
(Finland) Jari Litmanen	(Netherlands) Ajax	(Hungary) Ferencváros	5–1	27 September 1995	
(Spain) Raúl	(Spain) Real Madrid	(Hungary) Ferencváros	6–1	18 October 1995	
(England) Mike Newell	(England) Blackburn Rovers	(Norway) Rosenborg	4–1	6 December 1995	
(Italy) Marco Simone (1)	(Italy) Milan	(Norway) Rosenborg	4–1	25 September 1996	
(Colombia) Faustino Asprilla	(England) Newcastle United	(Spain) Barcelona	3–2	17 September 1997	
(Ukraine) Andriy Shevchenko (1)	(Ukraine) Dynamo Kyiv	(Spain) Barcelona	4–0	5 November 1997	
(England) Andy Cole (1)	(England) Manchester United	(Netherlands) Feyenoord	3–1	5 November 1997	
(Italy) Filippo Inzaghi (1)	(Italy) Juventus	(Ukraine) Dynamo Kyiv	4–1	18 March 1998	
(Italy) Alessandro Del Piero	(Italy) Juventus	(France) Monaco	4–1	1 April 1998	
(Norway) Sigurd Rushfeldt	(Norway) Rosenborg	(Turkey) Galatasaray	3–0	21 October 1998	
(Netherlands) Ruud van Nistelrooy (1)	(Netherlands) PSV Eindhoven	(Finland) HJK	3–1	25 November 1998	
(Germany) Uwe Rösler	(Germany) 1. FC Kaiserslautern	(Finland) HJK	5–2	9 December 1998	
(Russia) Andrei Tikhonov	(Russia) Spartak Moscow	(Netherlands) Willem II	3–1	15 September 1999	
(Italy) Simone Inzaghi^{4}	(Italy) Lazio	(France) Marseille	5–1	14 March 2000	
(Spain) Gerard López	(Spain) Valencia	(Italy) Lazio	5–2	5 April 2000	
(England) Andy Cole (2)	(England) Manchester United	(Belgium) Anderlecht	5–1	13 September 2000	
(Italy) Filippo Inzaghi (2)	(Italy) Juventus	(Germany) Hamburger SV	4–4	13 September 2000	
(Norway) Frode Johnsen	(Norway) Rosenborg	(Sweden) Helsingborg	6–1	26 September 2000	
(Italy) Marco Simone (2)	(France) Monaco	(Austria) Sturm Graz	5–0	27 September 2000	
(Brazil) Rivaldo	(Spain) Barcelona	(Italy) Milan	3–3	18 October 2000	
(Argentina) Claudio López	(Italy) Lazio	(Ukraine) Shakhtar Donetsk	5–1	25 October 2000	
(Uruguay) Walter Pandiani	(Spain) Deportivo La Coruña	(France) Paris Saint-Germain	4–3	7 March 2001	
(Serbia) Predrag Đorđević	(Greece) Olympiacos	(Germany) Bayer Leverkusen	6–2	18 September 2002	
(Netherlands) Roy Makaay (1)	(Spain) Deportivo La Coruña	(Germany) Bayern Munich	3–2	18 September 2002	
(Italy) Filippo Inzaghi (3)	(Italy) Milan	(Spain) Deportivo La Coruña	4–0	24 September 2002	
(Nigeria) Yakubu	(Israel) Maccabi Haifa	(Greece) Olympiacos	3–0	24 September 2002	
(England) Michael Owen (1)	(England) Liverpool	(Russia) Spartak Moscow	3–1	22 October 2002	
(France) Thierry Henry	(England) Arsenal	(Italy) Roma	3–1	27 November 2002	
(England) Alan Shearer	(England) Newcastle United	(Germany) Bayer Leverkusen	3–1	26 February 2003	
(Brazil) Ronaldo	(Spain) Real Madrid	(England) Manchester United	3–4	23 April 2003	
(Ivory Coast) Didier Drogba (1)	(France) Marseille	(Serbia) Partizan	3–0	1 October 2003	
(Croatia) Dado Pršo^{4}	(France) Monaco	(Spain) Deportivo La Coruña	8–3	5 November 2003	
(Netherlands) Roy Makaay (2)	(Germany) Bayern Munich	(Netherlands) Ajax	4–0	28 September 2004	
(England) Wayne Rooney	(England) Manchester United	(Turkey) Fenerbahçe	6–2	28 September 2004	
(Croatia) Ivan Klasnić	(Germany) Werder Bremen	(Belgium) Anderlecht	5–1	2 November 2004	
(Netherlands) Ruud van Nistelrooy^{4} (2)	(England) Manchester United	(Czech Republic) Sparta Prague	4–1	3 November 2004	
(Russia) Sergei Semak	(Russia) CSKA Moscow	(France) Paris Saint-Germain	3–1	7 December 2004	
(Turkey) Tuncay Şanlı	(Turkey) Fenerbahçe	(England) Manchester United	3–0	8 December 2004	
(France) Sylvain Wiltord	(France) Lyon	(Germany) Werder Bremen	7–2	8 March 2005	
(Brazil) Adriano (1)	(Italy) Inter Milan	(Portugal) Porto	3–1	15 March 2005	
(Italy) Vincenzo Iaquinta	(Italy) Udinese	(Greece) Panathinaikos	3–0	14 September 2005	
(Brazil) Ronaldinho	(Spain) Barcelona	(Italy) Udinese	4–1	27 September 2005	
(Cameroon) Samuel Eto'o (1)	(Spain) Barcelona	(Greece) Panathinaikos	5–0	2 November 2005	
(Ukraine) Andriy Shevchenko^{4} (2)	(Italy) Milan	(Turkey) Fenerbahçe	4–0	23 November 2005	
(Brazil) Adriano (2)	(Italy) Inter Milan	(Slovakia) Artmedia Bratislava	4–0	23 November 2005	
(Georgia (country)) Levan Kobiashvili	(Germany) Schalke 04	(Netherlands) PSV Eindhoven	3–0	23 November 2005	
(Spain) Fernando Morientes	(Spain) Valencia	(Greece) Olympiacos	4–2	12 September 2006	
(Ivory Coast) Didier Drogba (2)	(England) Chelsea	(Bulgaria) Levski Sofia	3–1	27 September 2006	
(Brazil) Kaká	(Italy) Milan	(Belgium) Anderlecht	4–1	1 November 2006	
(Israel) Yossi Benayoun	(England) Liverpool	(Turkey) Beşiktaş	8–0	6 November 2007	
(Spain) Joseba Llorente	(Spain) Villarreal	(Denmark) AaB	6–3	21 October 2008	
(Brazil) Jádson	(Ukraine) Shakhtar Donetsk	(Switzerland) Basel	5–0	26 November 2008	
(Brazil) Grafite	(Germany) VfL Wolfsburg	(Russia) CSKA Moscow	3–1	15 September 2009	
(England) Michael Owen (2)	(England) Manchester United	(Germany) VfL Wolfsburg	3–1	8 December 2009	
(Denmark) Nicklas Bendtner	(England) Arsenal	(Portugal) Porto	5–0	9 March 2010	
(Argentina) Lionel Messi^{4} (1)	(Spain) Barcelona	(England) Arsenal	4–1	6 April 2010	
(Croatia) Ivica Olić	(Germany) Bayern Munich	(France) Lyon	3–0	27 April 2010	
(Cameroon) Samuel Eto'o (2)	(Italy) Inter Milan	(Germany) Werder Bremen	4–0	29 September 2010	
(Wales) Gareth Bale	(England) Tottenham Hotspur	(Italy) Inter Milan	3–4	20 October 2010	
(France) André-Pierre Gignac	(France) Marseille	(Slovakia) MŠK Žilina	7–0	3 November 2010	
(Germany) Mario Gómez (1)	(Germany) Bayern Munich	(Romania) CFR Cluj	4–0	3 November 2010	
(France) Karim Benzema (1)	(Spain) Real Madrid	(France) Auxerre	4–0	8 December 2010	
(Argentina) Lionel Messi (2)	(Spain) Barcelona	(Czech Republic) Viktoria Plzeň	4–0	1 November 2011	
(Germany) Mario Gómez (2)	(Germany) Bayern Munich	(Italy) Napoli	3–2	2 November 2011	
(Spain) Roberto Soldado (1)	(Spain) Valencia	(Belgium) Genk	7–0	23 November 2011	
(France) Bafétimbi Gomis^{4}	(France) Lyon	(Croatia) Dinamo Zagreb	7–1	7 December 2011	
(Argentina) Lionel Messi^{5} (3)	(Spain) Barcelona	(Germany) Bayer Leverkusen	7–1	7 March 2012	
(Germany) Mario Gómez^{4} (3)	(Germany) Bayern Munich	(Switzerland) Basel	7–0	13 March 2012	
(Portugal) Cristiano Ronaldo (1)	(Spain) Real Madrid	(Netherlands) Ajax	4–1	3 October 2012	
(Spain) Roberto Soldado (2)	(Spain) Valencia	(Belarus) BATE Borisov	3–0	23 October 2012	
(Peru) Claudio Pizarro	(Germany) Bayern Munich	(France) Lille	6–1	7 November 2012	
(Turkey) Burak Yılmaz	(Turkey) Galatasaray	(Romania) CFR Cluj	3–1	7 November 2012	
(Portugal) Rui Pedro	(Romania) CFR Cluj	(Portugal) Braga	3–1	20 November 2012	
(Brazil) Luiz Adriano (1)	(Ukraine) Shakhtar Donetsk	(Denmark) Nordsjælland	5–2	20 November 2012	
(Poland) Robert Lewandowski^{4} (1)	(Germany) Borussia Dortmund	(Spain) Real Madrid	4–1	24 April 2013	
(Portugal) Cristiano Ronaldo (2)	(Spain) Real Madrid	(Turkey) Galatasaray	6–1	17 September 2013	
(Argentina) Lionel Messi (4)	(Spain) Barcelona	(Netherlands) Ajax	4–0	18 September 2013	
(Greece) Kostas Mitroglou	(Greece) Olympiacos	(Belgium) Anderlecht	3–0	2 October 2013	
(Sweden) Zlatan Ibrahimović^{4}	(France) Paris Saint-Germain	(Belgium) Anderlecht	5–0	23 October 2013	
(Spain) Álvaro Negredo	(England) Manchester City	(Russia) CSKA Moscow	5–2	5 November 2013	
(Chile) Arturo Vidal	(Italy) Juventus	(Denmark) Copenhagen	3–1	27 November 2013	
(Brazil) Neymar (1)	(Spain) Barcelona	(Scotland) Celtic	6–1	11 December 2013	
(Netherlands) Robin van Persie	(England) Manchester United	(Greece) Olympiacos	3–0	19 March 2014	
(Algeria) Yacine Brahimi	(Portugal) Porto	(Belarus) BATE Borisov	6–0	17 September 2014	
(England) Danny Welbeck	(England) Arsenal	(Turkey) Galatasaray	4–1	1 October 2014	
(Brazil) Luiz Adriano^{5} (2)	(Ukraine) Shakhtar Donetsk	(Belarus) BATE Borisov	7–0	21 October 2014	
(Brazil) Luiz Adriano (3)	(Ukraine) Shakhtar Donetsk	(Belarus) BATE Borisov	5–0	5 November 2014	
(Argentina) Lionel Messi (5)	(Spain) Barcelona	(Cyprus) APOEL	4–0	25 November 2014	
(Argentina) Sergio Agüero (1)	(England) Manchester City	(Germany) Bayern Munich	3–2	25 November 2014	
(Croatia) Mario Mandžukić	(Spain) Atlético Madrid	(Greece) Olympiacos	4–0	26 November 2014	
(Portugal) Cristiano Ronaldo (3)	(Spain) Real Madrid	(Ukraine) Shakhtar Donetsk	4–0	15 September 2015	
(Poland) Robert Lewandowski (2)	(Germany) Bayern Munich	(Croatia) Dinamo Zagreb	5–0	29 September 2015	
(Portugal) Cristiano Ronaldo^{4} (4)	(Spain) Real Madrid	(Sweden) Malmö FF	8–0	8 December 2015	
(France) Karim Benzema (2)	(Spain) Real Madrid	(Sweden) Malmö FF	8–0	8 December 2015	
(France) Olivier Giroud (1)	(England) Arsenal	(Greece) Olympiacos	3–0	9 December 2015	
(Portugal) Cristiano Ronaldo (5)	(Spain) Real Madrid	(Germany) VfL Wolfsburg	3–0	12 April 2016	
(Argentina) Lionel Messi (6)	(Spain) Barcelona	(Scotland) Celtic	7–0	13 September 2016	
(Argentina) Sergio Agüero (2)	(England) Manchester City	(Germany) Borussia Mönchengladbach	4–0	14 September 2016	
(Argentina) Lionel Messi (7)	(Spain) Barcelona	(England) Manchester City	4–0	19 October 2016	
(Germany) Mesut Özil	(England) Arsenal	(Bulgaria) Ludogorets Razgrad	6–0	19 October 2016	
(Spain) Lucas Pérez	(England) Arsenal	(Switzerland) Basel	4–1	6 December 2016	
(Turkey) Arda Turan	(Spain) Barcelona	(Germany) Borussia Mönchengladbach	4–0	6 December 2016	
(Gabon) Pierre-Emerick Aubameyang	(Germany) Borussia Dortmund	(Portugal) Benfica	4–0	8 March 2017	
(Portugal) Cristiano Ronaldo (6)	(Spain) Real Madrid	(Germany) Bayern Munich	4–2	18 April 2017	
(Portugal) Cristiano Ronaldo (7)	(Spain) Real Madrid	(Spain) Atlético Madrid	3–0	2 May 2017	
(England) Harry Kane (1)	(England) Tottenham Hotspur	(Cyprus) APOEL	3–0	26 September 2017	
(France) Wissam Ben Yedder	(Spain) Sevilla	(Slovenia) Maribor	3–0	26 September 2017	
(France) Layvin Kurzawa	(France) Paris Saint-Germain	(Belgium) Anderlecht	5–0	31 October 2017	
(Brazil) Philippe Coutinho	(England) Liverpool	(Russia) Spartak Moscow	7–0	6 December 2017	
(Senegal) Sadio Mané	(England) Liverpool	(Portugal) Porto	5–0	14 February 2018	
(Argentina) Lionel Messi (8)	(Spain) Barcelona	(Netherlands) PSV Eindhoven	4–0	18 September 2018	
(Argentina) Paulo Dybala	(Italy) Juventus	(Switzerland) Young Boys	3–0	2 October 2018	
(Bosnia and Herzegovina) Edin Džeko	(Italy) Roma	(Czech Republic) Viktoria Plzeň	5–0	2 October 2018	
(Brazil) Neymar (2)	(France) Paris Saint-Germain	(Serbia) Red Star Belgrade	6–1	3 October 2018	
(Brazil) Gabriel Jesus (1)	(England) Manchester City	(Ukraine) Shakhtar Donetsk	6–0	7 November 2018	
(Portugal) Cristiano Ronaldo (8)	(Italy) Juventus	(Spain) Atlético Madrid	3–0	12 March 2019	
(Brazil) Lucas Moura	(England) Tottenham Hotspur	(Netherlands) Ajax	3–2	8 May 2019	
(Norway) Erling Haaland (1)	(Austria) Red Bull Salzburg	(Belgium) Genk	6–2	17 September 2019	
(Croatia) Mislav Oršić	(Croatia) Dinamo Zagreb	(Italy) Atalanta	4–0	18 September 2019	
(Germany) Serge Gnabry^{4}	(Germany) Bayern Munich	(England) Tottenham Hotspur	7–2	1 October 2019	
(England) Raheem Sterling	(England) Manchester City	(Italy) Atalanta	5–1	22 October 2019	
(France) Kylian Mbappé (1)	(France) Paris Saint-Germain	(Belgium) Club Brugge	5–0	22 October 2019	
(Brazil) Rodrygo	(Spain) Real Madrid	(Turkey) Galatasaray	6–0	6 November 2019	
(Poland) Robert Lewandowski^{4} (3)	(Germany) Bayern Munich	(Serbia) Red Star Belgrade	6–0	26 November 2019	
(Poland) Arkadiusz Milik	(Italy) Napoli	(Belgium) Genk	4–0	10 December 2019	
(Brazil) Gabriel Jesus (2)	(England) Manchester City	(Croatia) Dinamo Zagreb	4–1	11 December 2019	
(Slovenia) Josip Iličić^{4}	(Italy) Atalanta	(Spain) Valencia	4–3	10 March 2020	
(England) Marcus Rashford	(England) Manchester United	(Germany) RB Leipzig	5–0	28 October 2020	
(France) Alassane Pléa	(Germany) Borussia Mönchengladbach	(Ukraine) Shakhtar Donetsk	6–0	3 November 2020	
(Portugal) Diogo Jota	(England) Liverpool	(Italy) Atalanta	5–0	3 November 2020	
(Turkey) İrfan Can Kahveci	(Turkey) İstanbul Başakşehir	(Germany) RB Leipzig	3–4	2 December 2020	
(France) Olivier Giroud^{4} (2)	(England) Chelsea	(Spain) Sevilla	4–0	2 December 2020	
(Brazil) Neymar (3)	(France) Paris Saint-Germain	(Turkey) İstanbul Başakşehir	5–1	9 December 2020	
(France) Kylian Mbappé (2)	(France) Paris Saint-Germain	(Spain) Barcelona	4–1	16 February 2021	
(France) Christopher Nkunku	(Germany) RB Leipzig	(England) Manchester City	3–6	15 September 2021	
(Ivory Coast) Sébastien Haller^{4}	(Netherlands) Ajax	(Portugal) Sporting CP	5–1	15 September 2021	
(Poland) Robert Lewandowski (4)	(Germany) Bayern Munich	(Portugal) Benfica	5–2	2 November 2021	
(Poland) Robert Lewandowski (5)	(Germany) Bayern Munich	(Austria) Red Bull Salzburg	7–1	8 March 2022	
(France) Karim Benzema (3)	(Spain) Real Madrid	(France) Paris Saint-Germain	3–1	9 March 2022	
(France) Karim Benzema (4)	(Spain) Real Madrid	(England) Chelsea	3–1	6 April 2022	
(Poland) Robert Lewandowski (6)	(Spain) Barcelona	(Czech Republic) Viktoria Plzeň	5–1	7 September 2022	
(Egypt) Mohamed Salah	(England) Liverpool	(Scotland) Rangers	7–1	12 October 2022	
(Norway) Erling Haaland^{5} (2)	(England) Manchester City	(Germany) RB Leipzig	7–0	14 March 2023	
(Brazil) Evanilson	(Portugal) Porto	(Belgium) Antwerp	4–1	25 October 2023	
(Portugal) João Mário	(Portugal) Benfica	(Italy) Inter Milan	3–3	29 November 2023	
(England) Harry Kane^{4} (2)	(Germany) Bayern Munich	(Croatia) Dinamo Zagreb	9–2	17 September 2024	
(Germany) Karim Adeyemi	(Germany) Borussia Dortmund	(Scotland) Celtic	7–1	1 October 2024	
(Brazil) Vinícius Júnior	(Spain) Real Madrid	(Germany) Borussia Dortmund	5–2	22 October 2024	
(Brazil) Raphinha	(Spain) Barcelona	(Germany) Bayern Munich	4–1	23 October 2024	
(Sweden) Viktor Gyökeres	(Portugal) Sporting CP	(England) Manchester City	4–1	5 November 2024	
(Colombia) Luis Díaz	(England) Liverpool	(Germany) Bayer Leverkusen	4–0	5 November 2024	
(Greece) Vangelis Pavlidis	(Portugal) Benfica	(Spain) Barcelona	4–5	21 January 2025	
(France) Ousmane Dembélé	(France) Paris Saint-Germain	(Germany) VfB Stuttgart	4–1	29 January 2025	
(Argentina) Lautaro Martínez	(Italy) Inter Milan	(France) Monaco	3–0	29 January 2025	
(England) Morgan Rogers	(England) Aston Villa	(Scotland) Celtic	4–2	29 January 2025	
(France) Kylian Mbappé (3)	(Spain) Real Madrid	(England) Manchester City	3–1	19 February 2025	
(Guinea) Serhou Guirassy	(Germany) Borussia Dortmund	(Spain) Barcelona	3–1	15 April 2025	
(France) Kylian Mbappé (4)	(Spain) Real Madrid	(Kazakhstan) Kairat	5–0	30 September 2025	
(Spain) Fermín López	(Spain) Barcelona	(Greece) Olympiacos	6–1	21 October 2025	
(Nigeria) Victor Osimhen	(Turkey) Galatasaray	(Netherlands) Ajax	3–0	5 November 2025	
(France) Kylian Mbappé^{4} (5)	(Spain) Real Madrid	(Greece) Olympiacos	4–3	26 November 2025	
(Portugal) Vitinha	(France) Paris Saint-Germain	(England) Tottenham Hotspur	5–3	26 November 2025	
(England) Anthony Gordon^{4}	(England) Newcastle United	(Azerbaijan) Qarabağ	6–1	18 February 2026	
(Norway) Alexander Sørloth	(Spain) Atlético Madrid	(Belgium) Club Brugge	4–1	24 February 2026	
(Uruguay) Federico Valverde	(Spain) Real Madrid	(England) Manchester City	3–0	11 March 2026	
(Bosnia and Herzegovina) Ermedin Demirović	(Germany) VfB Stuttgart	(Norway) Viking	3–1	9 September 2026	
(Spain) Ferran Torres	(France) Paris Saint-Germain	(Slovakia) Slovan Bratislava	6–1	9 September 2026	
(Germany) Nicolò Tresoldi	(Belgium) Club Brugge	(Italy) Inter Milan	4–3	13 October 2026	
(France) Bradley Barcola	(England) Liverpool	(Austria) LASK	6–3	14 October 2026	
(England) Phil Foden	(England) Manchester City	(Greece) AEK Athens	5–1	20 October 2026	
(Greece) Anastasios Douvikas	(Italy) Como	(France) Lens	9–1	4 November 2026	

== Multiple hat-tricks ==
The following table lists the number of hat-tricks scored by players who have scored two or more hat-tricks. Bold indicates a player who is currently active in Europe.

Rank	Player	Hat-tricks
1	(Portugal) Cristiano Ronaldo	8
1	(Argentina) Lionel Messi	8
3	Robert Lewandowski	6
4	(France) **Kylian Mbappé**	5
5	(France) Karim Benzema	4
6	(Brazil) Luiz Adriano	3
6	(Germany) Mario Gómez	3
6	(Italy) Filippo Inzaghi	3
6	(Brazil) Neymar	3
10	(Brazil) Adriano	2
10	(Argentina) Sergio Agüero	2
10	(England) Andy Cole	2
10	(Ivory Coast) Didier Drogba	2
10	(Cameroon) Samuel Eto'o	2
10	(France) **Olivier Giroud**	2
10	(Norway) **Erling Haaland**	2
10	(Brazil) **Gabriel Jesus**	2
10	(England) **Harry Kane**	2
10	(Netherlands) Roy Makaay	2
10	(Netherlands) Ruud van Nistelrooy	2
10	(England) Michael Owen	2
10	(Ukraine) Andriy Shevchenko	2
10	(Italy) Marco Simone	2
10	(Spain) Roberto Soldado	2

== Hat-tricks by nationality ==
As of 4 November 2026

The following table lists the number of hat-tricks scored by players from a single nation.

Champions League hat-tricks by nationality
Rank	Nation	Hat-tricks	Last hat-trick
1	Brazil	23	23 October 2024
2	France	22	14 October 2026
3	England	15	20 October 2026
4	Argentina	13	29 January 2025
5	Portugal	12	26 November 2025
6	Spain	10	9 September 2026
7	Germany	9	13 October 2026
8	Italy	8	14 September 2005
9	Netherlands	7	19 March 2014
9	Poland	7	7 September 2022
11	Croatia	5	18 September 2019
11	Norway	5	24 February 2026
13	Turkey	4	2 December 2020
14	Greece	3	4 November 2026
14	Ivory Coast	3	15 September 2021
16	Bosnia and Herzegovina	2	9 September 2026
16	Cameroon	2	29 September 2010
16	Colombia	2	5 November 2024
16	Nigeria	2	5 November 2025
16	Russia	2	7 December 2004
16	Sweden	2	5 November 2024
16	Ukraine	2	23 November 2005
16	Uruguay	2	11 March 2026
24	Algeria	1	17 September 2014
24	Belgium	1	29 September 1993
24	Chile	1	27 November 2013
24	Denmark	1	9 March 2010
24	Egypt	1	12 October 2022
24	Finland	1	27 September 1995
24	Gabon	1	8 March 2017
24	Georgia	1	23 November 2005
24	Guinea	1	15 April 2025
24	Israel	1	6 November 2007
24	Peru	1	7 November 2012
24	Senegal	1	14 February 2018
24	Serbia	1	18 September 2002
24	Slovenia	1	10 March 2020
24	Wales	1	20 October 2010

== Hat-tricks by club ==
As of 4 November 2026

The following table lists the number of hat-tricks scored by players from given club.

Rank	Club	Hat-tricks	Last hat-trick
1	(Spain) Real Madrid	19	11 March 2026
2	(Spain) Barcelona	16	21 October 2025
3	(Germany) Bayern Munich	12	17 September 2024
4	(England) Liverpool	9	14 October 2026
4	(France) Paris Saint-Germain	9	9 September 2026
6	(England) Manchester City	8	20 October 2026
7	(England) Manchester United	7	28 October 2020
8	(England) Arsenal	6	6 December 2016
8	(Italy) Juventus	6	12 March 2019
10	(Italy) Milan	5	1 November 2006
11	(Germany) Borussia Dortmund	4	15 April 2025
11	(Italy) Inter Milan	4	29 January 2025
11	(Spain) Valencia	4	23 October 2012
11	(Ukraine) Shakhtar Donetsk	4	5 November 2014
15	(England) Newcastle United	3	18 February 2026
15	(England) Tottenham Hotspur	3	8 May 2019
15	(France) Marseille	3	3 November 2010
15	(Netherlands) PSV Eindhoven	3	25 November 1998
19	(England) Chelsea	2	2 December 2020
19	(France) Lyon	2	7 December 2011
19	(France) Monaco	2	5 November 2003
19	(Germany) Werder Bremen	2	2 November 2004
19	(Greece) Olympiacos	2	2 October 2013
19	(Italy) Lazio	2	25 October 2000
19	(Netherlands) Ajax	2	15 September 2021
19	(Norway) Rosenborg	2	26 September 2000
19	(Portugal) Benfica	2	21 January 2025
19	(Portugal) Porto	2	25 October 2023
19	(Spain) Atlético Madrid	2	24 February 2026
19	(Spain) Deportivo La Coruña	2	18 September 2002
19	(Turkey) Galatasaray	2	5 November 2025
32	(Austria) Red Bull Salzburg	1	17 September 2019
32	(Belgium) Anderlecht	1	29 September 1993
32	(Belgium) Club Brugge	1	13 October 2026
32	(Croatia) Dinamo Zagreb	1	18 September 2019
32	(England) Aston Villa	1	29 January 2025
32	(England) Blackburn Rovers	1	6 December 1995
32	(Germany) 1. FC Kaiserslautern	1	9 December 1998
32	(Germany) Borussia Mönchengladbach	1	3 November 2020
32	(Germany) RB Leipzig	1	15 September 2021
32	(Germany) Schalke 04	1	23 November 2005
32	(Germany) VfB Stuttgart	1	9 September 2026
32	(Germany) VfL Wolfsburg	1	15 September 2009
32	(Israel) Maccabi Haifa	1	24 September 2002
32	(Italy) Atalanta	1	10 March 2020
32	(Italy) Como	1	4 November 2026
32	(Italy) Napoli	1	10 December 2019
32	(Italy) Roma	1	2 October 2018
32	(Italy) Udinese	1	14 September 2005
32	(Portugal) Sporting CP	1	5 November 2024
32	(Romania) CFR Cluj	1	20 November 2012
32	(Russia) CSKA Moscow	1	7 December 2004
32	(Russia) Spartak Moscow	1	15 September 1999
32	(Spain) Sevilla	1	26 September 2017
32	(Spain) Villarreal	1	21 October 2008
32	(Turkey) Fenerbahçe	1	8 December 2004
32	(Turkey) İstanbul Başakşehir	1	2 December 2020
32	(Ukraine) Dynamo Kyiv	1	5 November 1997

== See also ==
- European Cup and UEFA Champions League records and statistics
- List of UEFA Champions League top scorers
- List of UEFA Conference League hat-tricks
- List of UEFA Europa League hat-tricks
