= Oudejaarsconference =

Dutch New Year's Eve tradition

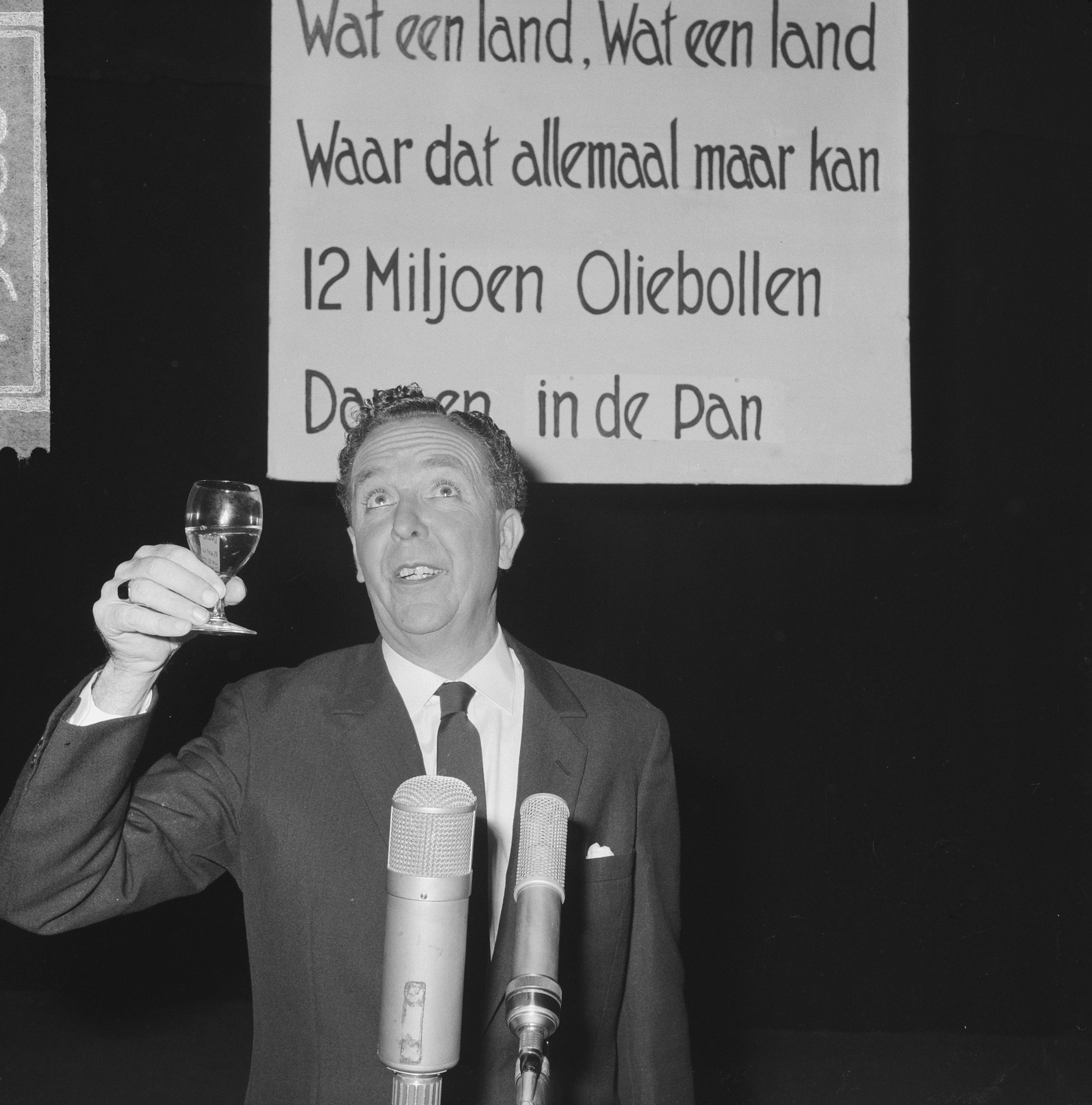
Wim Kan during the oudejaarsconference of 1963

The oudejaarsconference (English: New Year's Eve conference) is a cabaret performance that is performed annually in December. The conference discusses the past year, every year by different comedians. The oudejaarsconference is a Dutch tradition, but since 1993 Belgium has also had its own oudejaarsconference. The conference has been broadcast on television since 1969.

== History ==
The play Gijsbrecht van Aemstel by Joost van den Vondel was invariably followed by the farce The Wedding of Kloris and Roosje from 1720 to the 1960s at the end of December. This comedy was performed after the Gijsbrecht van Aemstel tragedy to ensure that the audience did not return home in a sad mood. The wedding of Kloris and Roosje included a New Year's wish that was always preceded by a passage in which a humorous look back was made on the past year. This piece is often seen as the forerunner of the modern oudejaarsconferences.

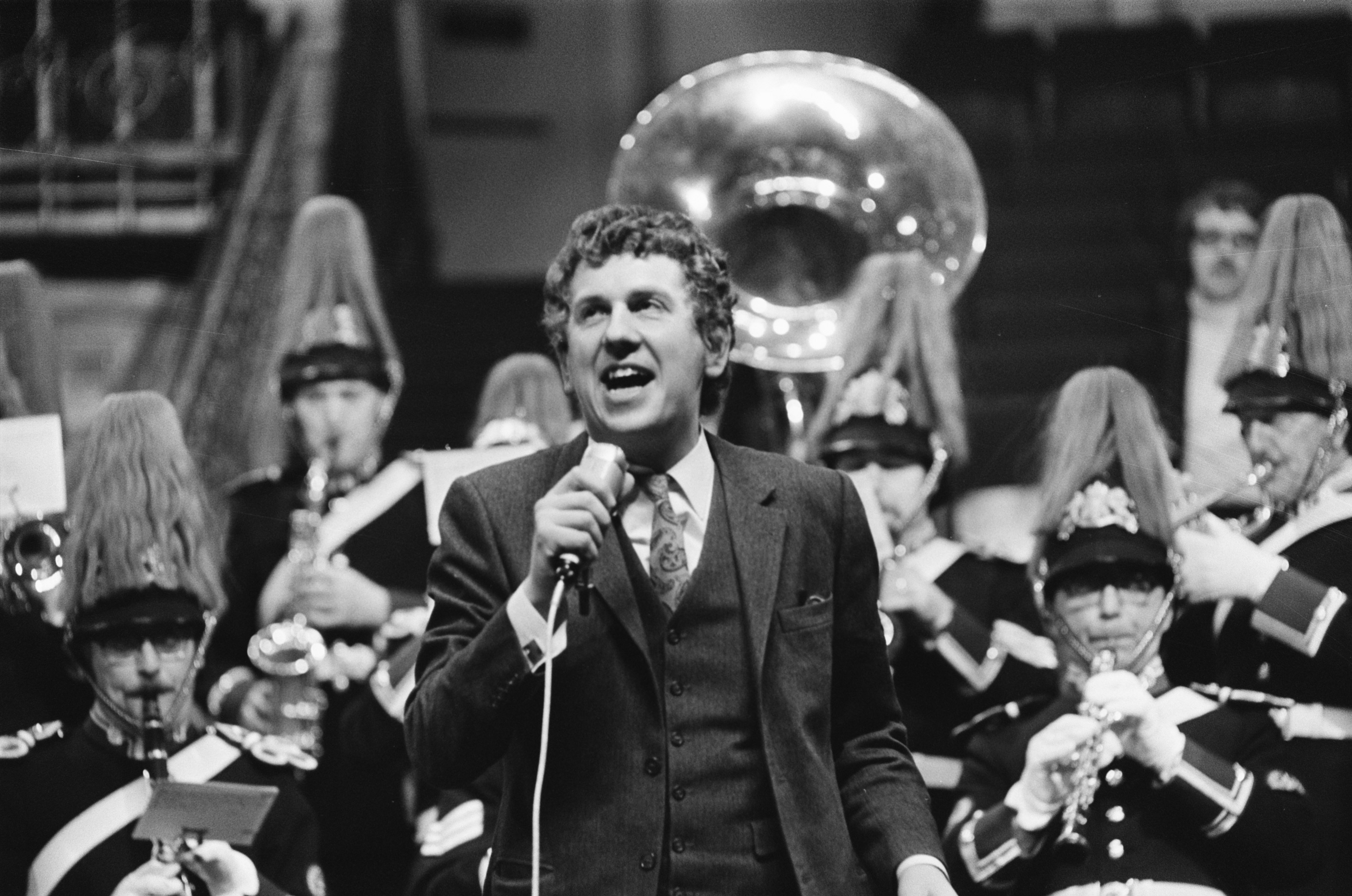
Seth Gaaikema in 1969

=== 1954 – 1982 ===
The first modern oudejaarsconference took place in 1954. The Dutch comedian Wim Kan gave in 1954 a conference on the radio, in which he made jokes and looked back on the year 1954. The broadcast was an immediate success, after which Kan decided to make it a recurring event. Six more oudejaarsconferences by Wim Kan followed later. However, in 1969 Wim Kan was unable to perform due to fatigue, so Seth Gaaikema did the oudejaarsconference in 1969. Gaaikema did not perform the conference on the radio, but was the first comedian to perform the conference on television. In 1973, Wim Kan took over the oudejaarsconference again, which also moved from radio to television.

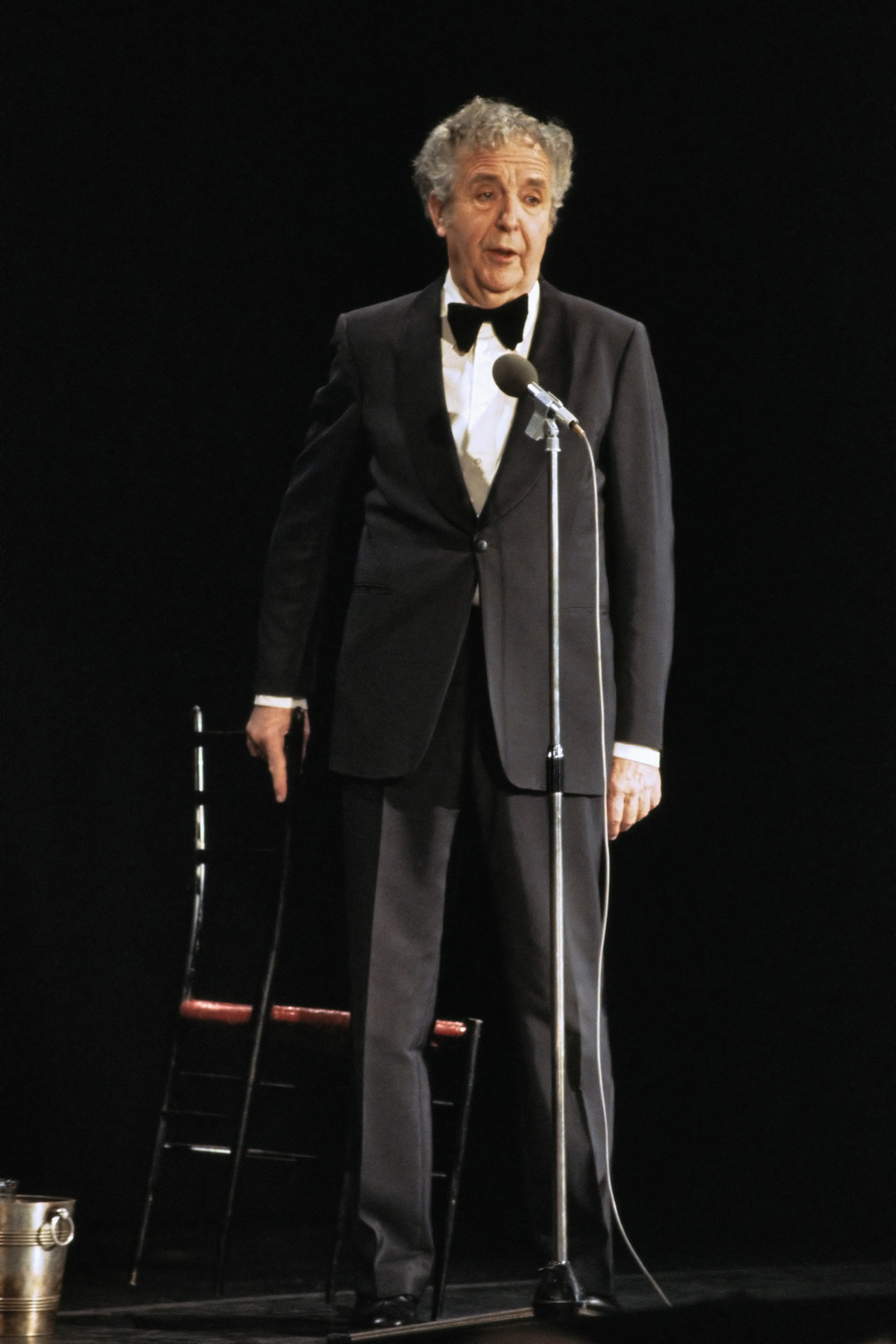
Wim Kan in 1979

=== 1982 – present ===
In 1982 there were two oudejaarsconferences on television. On the first television network, Wim Kan held a conference (broadcast by VARA) and on the second television network a oudejaarsconference was broadcast by IKON, performed by the new and refreshing comedian Freek de Jonge. Later, Freek de Jonge's conference turned out to be much more popular than Wim Kan's, which is why Wim Kan decided to stop with the oudejaarsconference. Wim Kan appointed Freek de Jonge as his successor.

Freek de Jonge held an annual oudejaarsconference until 1984. Later, Seth Gaaikema conducted a oudejaarsconference from 1985 to 1986. Since 1987, the oudejaarsconference has been alternately performed on television by different comedians. In 1989, comedian Youp van 't Hek held a oudejaarsconference on television for the first time. In 1990 Seth Gaaikema stopped with the conference. In 1994, the cabaret duo Lebbis and Jansen held a oudejaarsconference on the radio and in 2000 on television.

The comedians Freek de Jonge (his conferences were broadcast by VPRO) and Youp van 't Hek (his conferences were broadcast by VARA) alternately conducted a oudejaarsconference. In 2006, Guido Weijers held his first oudejaarsconference on the commercial channel SBS6. In 2010, the broadcaster VARA decided that the oudejaarsconference would be performed by a different comedian every year. In 2010, the oudejaarsconference was staged by Erik van Muiswinkel, who did it together with some other comedians. In 2013, Theo Maassen held a oudejaarsconference on behalf of VARA. In 2015, Herman Finkers held the oudejaarsconference for the first time and in 2016 Claudia de Breij held the conference, making her the first woman to ever hold a oudejaarsconference. Since 2014, the conferences have been broadcast by Guido Weijers on RTL 4. In 2020, Youp van 't Hek held his last oudejaarsconference.

Comedian Peter Pannekoek succeeded Youp van 't Hek in 2021 to do the oudejaarsconference, which was well received. The following year, Claudia de Breij did the conference for BNNVARA and Guido Weijers for RTL 4.

In 2023, Micha Wertheim did the oudejaarsconference for BNNVARA. It was the least-watched New Year's Eve conference on television ever. According to the comedian, that didn't matter. Wertheim says, 'The lower the ratings, the greater my success'. Wertheim's conference is special, because his conference was made especially for television, in which he appeared twice. First as a traditional comedian in a tuxedo who went through the past year in an old-fashioned humorous way. And then as himself in a blue jumper with oliebollen on it, who deviated from tradition and called on people to turn off the television and their phones and talk to each other and celebrate New Year's Eve together.

In 2024, comedian Pieter Derks was allowed to do the oudejaarsconference for broadcaster BNNVARA. Comedian Guido Weijers had cancelled his oudejaarsconference for television channel RTL 4, because he says he 'doesn't have time' to produce the conference. That same year, the VPRO broadcast two conferences. On NPO 2, the VPRO broadcast a conference by Freek de Jonge, which was billed as a 'Christmas conference' (Kerstconference). On NPO 3, the VPRO broadcast a oudejaarsconference presented by several female comedians. This conference was followed in 2025, but without television coverage.

In 2025, Peter Pannekoek presented his second New Year's Eve program for broadcaster BNNVARA. In an interview with de Volkskrant, Pannekoek said he considered the oudejaarsconference a wonderful tradition, one that allowed people to look back on the past year with humor. His second show focused on the theme of hope, which, according to Pannekoek, was difficult to find in 2025, but which, he argued, was still present. The oudejaarsconference attracted a total of 3.3 million viewers, making it the most-watched edition in years. Pannekoek said in a statement that he was incredibly honored that his conference was so well-watched.

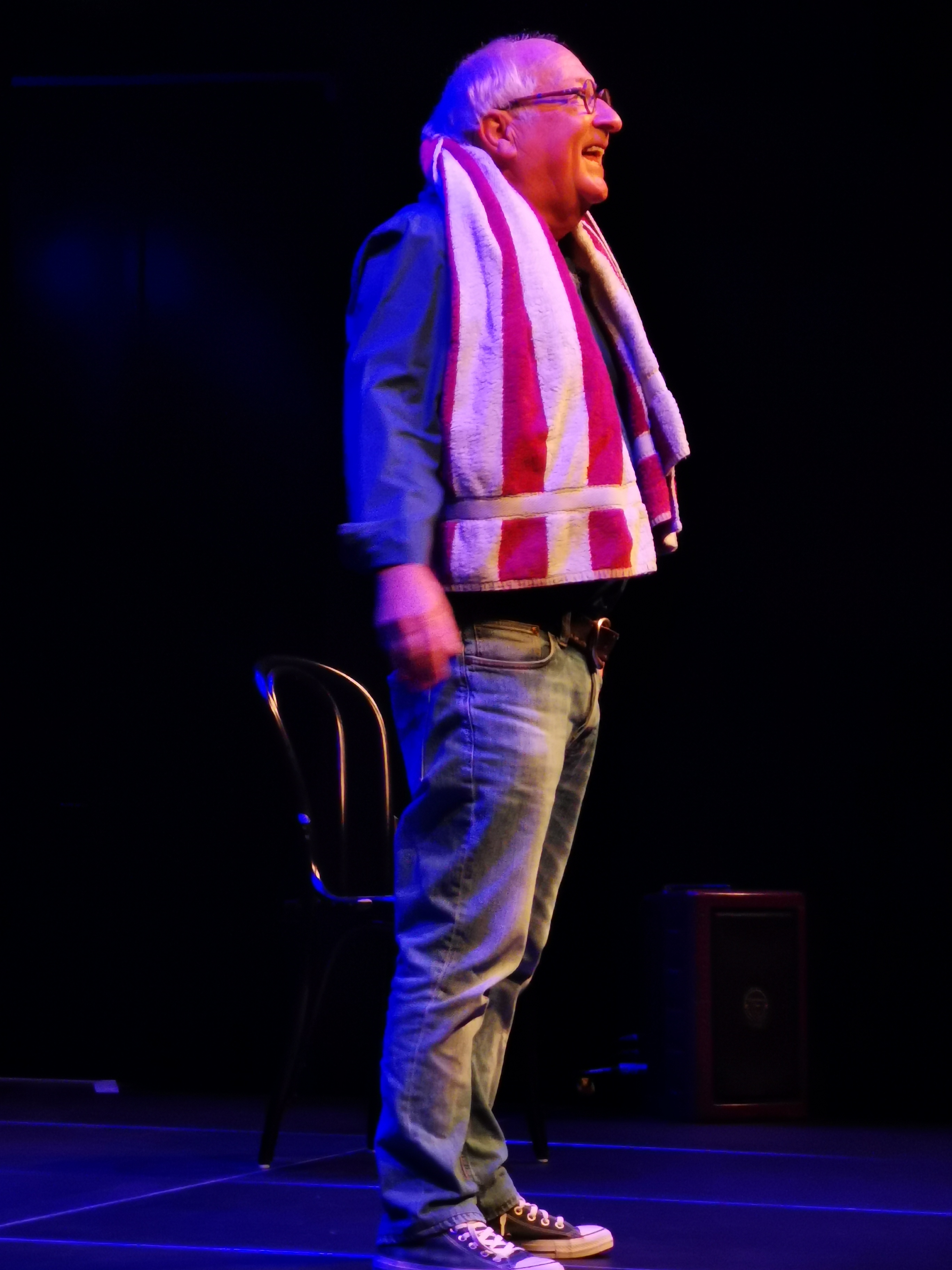
Youp van 't Hek in 2020

The oudejaarsconference is not just a conference especially for television. For example, Dolf Jansen has been publishing his oudejaarsconferences on YouTube since 2014. Other Dutch comedians are also doing a oudejaarsconference. Comedian Sjaak Bral has made conferences every year since 1996, especially for the regional channel Omroep West.

== List of Dutch oudejaarsconferences broadcast on radio and television ==
Overview of Dutch New Year's Eve conferences from 1954 to the present:

Year	Comedian	Conference title	Network
1954	Wim Kan	Nou je weet wa'k zeggen wil	VARA
1956	Wim Kan	't Was Me Het Jaartje Wel	VARA
1958	Wim Kan	Waardig Over De Drempel	VARA
1960	Wim Kan	Uithuilen En Opnieuw Beginnen	VARA
1963	Wim Kan	12 Miljoen Oliebollen Op Aardgas	VARA
1966	Wim Kan	Lachend Over De Loongrens	VARA
1969	Seth Gaaikema	Heer, Ik Kom Hier Om Te Twijfelen	VARA
1970	Seth Gaaikema	Met Mekaar Op Oudejaar	VARA
1973	Wim Kan	Zuinig Over De Drempel	VARA
1976	Wim Kan	Waar Gaan We In Het Nieuwe Jaar Naar Toe?	VARA
1977	Neerlands Hoop in Bange Dagen	—	VARA
1979	Wim Kan	Wankelend Over De Drempel	VARA
1981	Wim Kan	—	KRO
1982	Wim Kan	Wij Spreken Af... Dat Wij Niets Afspreken	VARA
1982	Freek de Jonge	De Openbaring	IKON
1983	Freek de Jonge	Een Verademing	VPRO
1984	Freek de Jonge	De Finale	VPRO
1985	Seth Gaaikema	—	Veronica
1986	Seth Gaaikema	Dat Moet Toch Kunnen	Veronica
1987	Freek de Jonge	De ontlading	VPRO
1988	Seth Gaaikema	Zo Kan Het Ook	Veronica
1989	Youp van 't Hek	Oudejaarsconference 1989	VARA
1990	Seth Gaaikema	Geef Mij Maar Nederland	Veronica
1992	Freek de Jonge	De Estafette	VPRO
1994	Lebbis en Jansen	—	VARA
1995	Lebbis en Jansen	—	VARA
1995	Youp van 't Hek	Het Is Liegen Of Sterven	VARA
1996	Freek de Jonge	Brand and Het Luik	VPRO
1996	Lebbis en Jansen	—	VARA
1997	Freek de Jonge	Papa Razzia	VPRO
1998	Lebbis en Jansen	Jakkeren (voor hetzelfde geld)	VARA
1999	Youp van 't Hek	Mond Vol Tanden	VARA
2000	Freek de Jonge	De Gillende Keukenmeid	VPRO
2000	Lebbis en Jansen	Jakkeren in 70 minuten door 2000	VARA
2001	Freek de Jonge	Het Laatste Oordeel	VPRO
2001	Lebbis en Jansen	Oudejaars 2001	VARA
2002	Youp van 't Hek	Youp Speelt Youp	VARA
2002	Lebbis en Jansen	Oudejaars 2002	VARA
2003	Lebbis en Jansen	Jakkeren door 2003	VARA
2004	Lebbis en Jansen	Twee Lieve Jongens In Een Woelige Wereld	VARA
2005	Youp van 't Hek	Het Zelfmoordcommando	VARA
2005	Lebbis en Jansen	Oudejaars 2005	VARA
2006	Guido Weijers	De Oudejaarsconference 2006	SBS6
2006	Lebbis en Jansen	Oudejaars 2006	VARA
2007	Jan Jaap van der Wal	Onderbewust	VARA
2007	Dolf Jansen	Geen Oudejaarsvoorstelling	VARA
2007	Guido Weijers	De Oudejaarsconference 2007	SBS6
2008	Arie Koomen	Uit!	BNN
2008	Guido Weijers	De Oudejaarsconference 2008	SBS6
2008	Dolf Jansen	Echt	VARA
2008	Youp van 't Hek	Troost	VARA
2009	Freek de Jonge	Freeks Nederland: Volendam	VPRO
2009	Jan Jaap van der Wal	Lekker Hard Lachen Met Oliebollen	VARA
2009	Guido Weijers	De Oudejaarsconference 2009	SBS6
2010	Erik van Muiswinkel and others	Gedoog, Hoop & Liefde	VARA
2010	Dolf Jansen	Oudejaars 2010	VARA
2010	Freek de Jonge	Het Verlossende Woord	VPRO
2010	Arie Koomen, Wilko Terwijn, Menno Stam	Bijbabbelen	BNN
2010	Guido Weijers	De Oudejaarsconference 2010	SBS6
2011	Youp van 't Hek	De tweede viool	VARA
2011	Dolf Jansen	De Oudejaars van de Straat	VARA
2011	Freek de Jonge	Lone Wolf	VPRO
2011	Beau van Erven Dorens	De Wereld van Beau: Oudejaarsconference	SBS6
2012	Erik van Muiswinkel and others	Het Eerlijke Verhaal	VARA
2012	Guido Weijers	—	KRO
2013	Theo Maassen	Einde oefening	VARA
2013	Pieter Derks	Een Oudejaars	BNN
2014	Youp van 't Hek	Wat is de vraag?	VARA
2014	Guido Weijers	—	RTL 4
2015	Herman Finkers	Een uur Herman Finkers	VARA
2016	Claudia de Breij	—	VARA
2016	Javier Guzman	Zonde(r) voornemens	RTL 4
2017	Youp van 't Hek	Een vloek en een zucht	BNNVARA
2017	Guido Weijers	—	RTL 4
2018	Marc-Marie Huijbregts	Onderweg Naar Morgen	BNNVARA
2018	Guido Weijers	—	RTL 4
2018	Javier Guzman	—	Comedy Central
2019	Claudia de Breij	—	BNNVARA
2019	Freek de Jonge	De Lachgasfabriek	VPRO
2019	Martijn Koning	—	RTL 4
2020	Youp van 't Hek	Korrel Zout	BNNVARA
2020	Jan Beuving and Patrick Nederkoorn	De andere Oudejaars	BNNVARA
2020	Guido Weijers	—	RTL 4
2020	Javier Guzman	Raspopulist	Comedy Central
2021	Peter Pannekoek	Nieuw Bloed	BNNVARA
2021	Najib Amhali	Wie het weet mag het zeggen!	SBS6
2021	Javier Guzman	In Vertwijfeling Verblijven	Comedy Central
2022	Claudia de Breij	—	BNNVARA
2022	Guido Weijers	—	RTL 4
2023	Micha Wertheim	Micha Wertheim voor twaalven	BNNVARA
2024	Pieter Derks	Nu even niet	BNNVARA
2024	Freek de Jonge	Vrede op aarde	VPRO
2024	Various female comedians	Vrouwejaars	VPRO
2025	Peter Pannekoek	Perspectief	BNNVARA

=== Overview of most watched Dutch oudejaarsconferences on television ===
Below is an overview of the most watched Dutch oudejaarsconferences on television:

Position	Comedian	Year	Network	Viewers (millions)
1	Wim Kan	1976	VARA	7.400
2	Wim Kan	1982	VARA	7.360
3	Wim Kan	1973	VARA	6.500
4	Wim Kan	1979	VARA	6.400
5	Seth Gaaikema	1986	Veronica	6.150
6	Youp van 't Hek	2002	VARA	4.146
7	Herman Finkers	2015	VARA	3.791
8	Youp van 't Hek	2020	BNNVARA	3.504
9	Peter Pannekoek	2025	BNNVARA	3.340
10	Youp van 't Hek	2017	BNNVARA	3.135

== Oudejaarsconference in Belgium ==
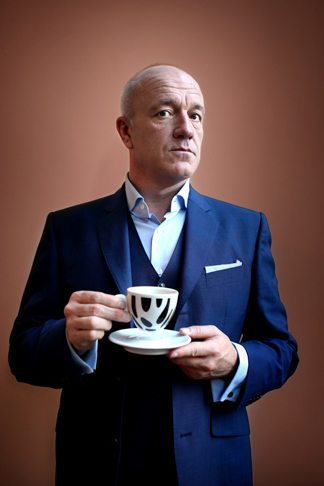
Geert Hoste introduced the oudejaarsconference in Belgium in 1993

Since 1993, a oudejaarsconference has also been broadcast on television in Belgium. Comedian Geert Hoste was the person who introduced the tradition. Hoste provided the oudejaarsconference from 1993 to 2015.

From 2003 to 2007, Raf Coppens, held an oudejaarsconference on the commercial channel VTM. From 2012 to 2018, Michael Van Peel provided the oudejaarsconference for the public broadcaster VRT. Since 2019, Kamal Kharmach has provided the oudejaarsconference on the channel VRT 1.

== List of Belgian oudejaarsconferences broadcast on television ==
Year	Comedian	Conference title	Network
1992	Geert Hoste	Live Wit	Radio 1
1993	Geert Hoste	Live Zwart	Één
1994	Geert Hoste	Koning	Één
1995	Geert Hoste	Alleen	Één
1996	Geert Hoste	Spreekt	Één
1997	Geert Hoste	JA!	Één
1998	Geert Hoste	3000	Één
1999	Geert Hoste	Sterk	Één
2000	Geert Hoste	Verdorie	Één
2001	Geert Hoste	Dwars	Één
2002	Geert Hoste	Puur en Onversneden	Één
2003	Geert Hoste	Hard	Één
2003	Raf Coppens	Lacht Uit	VTM
2004	Geert Hoste	Patat	Één
2004	Raf Coppens	Lacht Uit	VTM
2005	Geert Hoste	Staat	Één
2005	Raf Coppens	Lacht Uit	VTM
2006	Geert Hoste	Staat Verder	Één
2006	Various comedians	Het Ergste Is Al Geweest	Canvas
2006	Raf Coppens	Lacht Uit	VTM
2007	Geert Hoste	Houdt Woord	Één
2007	Not known	Het Ergste Is Al Geweest	Canvas
2007	Raf Coppens	Lacht Uit	VTM
2008	Geert Hoste	Regeert	Één
2008	Various comedians	Het Besluit	Canvas
2009	Geert Hoste	Beslist	Één
2009	Various comedians	Het Besluit	Canvas
2010	Geert Hoste	Vulkaan	Één
2010	Various comedians	Het Besluit	Canvas
2011	Geert Hoste	Kookt	Één
2011	Various comedians	Het Besluit	Canvas
2012	Geert Hoste	XX	Één
2012	Michael Van Peel	Van Peel overleeft de Apocalyps	Canvas
2013	Geert Hoste	King	Één
2013	Michael Van Peel	Van Peel overleeft Big Brother	Canvas
2014	Geert Hoste	LOL	Één
2014	Michael Van Peel	Van Peel overleeft WOIII	Canvas
2015	Geert Hoste	JUMP	Één
2015	Michael Van Peel	Van Peel overleeft de Exodus	Canvas
2016	Michael Van Peel	Van Peel overleeft de Muur	Canvas
2017	Michael Van Peel	Van Peel overleeft de Graaicultuur	Canvas
2018	Michael Van Peel	Van Peel overleeft de Evil Clowns	Canvas
2019	Kamal Kharmach	Mag ik even?	Canvas
2020	Kamal Kharmach	Mag ik even?	Één
2021	Kamal Kharmach	Mag ik even?	Één
2022	Kamal Kharmach	Mag ik even?	Één
2023	Kamal Kharmach	Mag ik even?	VRT 1
2023	Xander De Rycke	Houdt het voor bekeken 2023	VRT 1
2023	Joost Vandecasteele	#Eindejaars – Een Beetje Extreem	VTM
2024	Kamal Kharmach	Mag ik even?	VRT 1
2024	Xander De Rycke	Houdt het voor bekeken 2024	VRT Canvas
2025	Kamal Kharmach	Mag ik even?	VRT 1
2025	Xander De Rycke	Houdt het voor bekeken 2025	VRT Canvas

=== Overview of most watched Belgian oudejaarsconferences on television ===
Below is an overview of the most watched Belgian oudejaarsconferences on television:

Position	Comedian	Year	Network	Viewers (millions)
1	Geert Hoste	2012	Één	1.702
2	Geert Hoste	2009	Één	1.700
3	Geert Hoste	2010	Één	1.546
4	Geert Hoste	2013	Één	1.515
5	Geert Hoste	2014	Één	1.419
6	Geert Hoste	2015	Één	1.339
7	Kamal Kharmach	2023	VRT 1	1.300
8	Kamal Kharmach	2025	VRT 1	1.168
9	Kamal Kharmach	2024	VRT 1	1.161
10	Kamal Kharmach	2021	Één	0.696

== See also ==
- Cabaret
- Oliebol
- Television in the Netherlands
- Culture of the Netherlands
