= Youp van 't Hek =

Dutch comedian

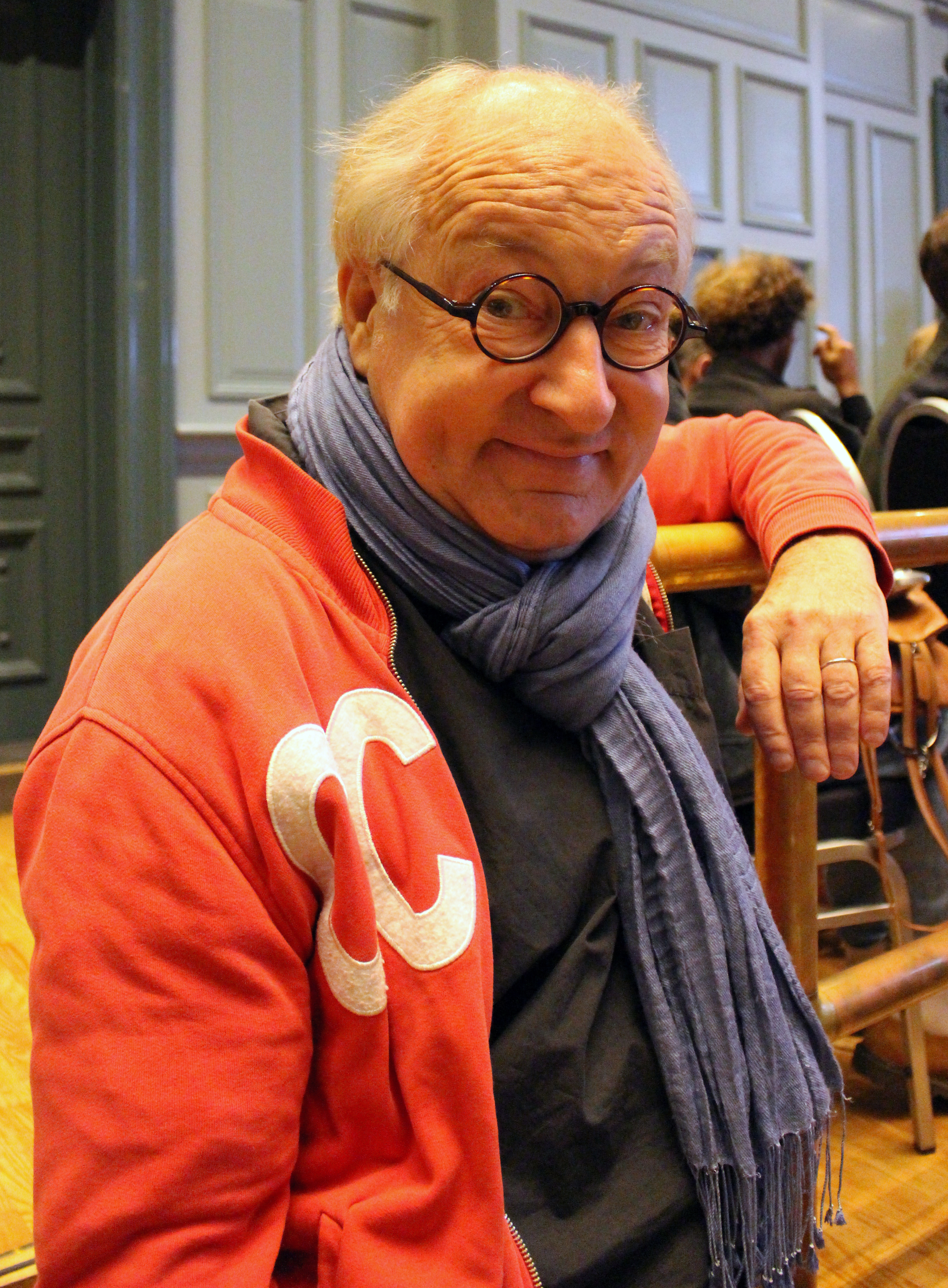
- Van 't Hek in 2013
- Born: Joseph Jacobus Maria van 't Hek; 28 February 1954 (age 72); Naarden, Netherlands
- Notable work: Buckler
- Spouse: Debby Petter (m. 1984)
- Children: 3
- Relatives: Tom van 't Hek (brother)

Comedy career
- Years active: 1973–present
- Medium: Comedian, author, columnist, singer-songwriter, playwright, critic
- Genres: Cabaret, observational comedy, musical comedy, cringe comedy, satire, political satire, sarcasm, blue comedy
- Subjects: Marriage, relationships, family, childhood, midlife crisis, elderly care, high society, everyday life, human behavior, current events, self-deprecation, social criticism, religion, death, Oranjegekte, Dutch culture
- Website: youp.nl (in Dutch)

Joseph Jacobus Maria "Youp" van 't Hek (born 28 February 1954) is a Dutch author, columnist, singer-songwriter, playwright, critic and former comedian.

== Biography ==
Van 't Hek was born and raised in the Gooi, an upper-class region to the southeast of Amsterdam. In 1973 he changed his name from Joep to Youp. He was one of the founding members of Cabaret NAR (Cabaret Jester). In the early 1980s, Cabaret NAR's success declined and Van 't Hek moved on as a solo artist. His big break came in 1983 on KRO's De alles is anders-show. His energetic performance made him a household name overnight.

In his 1989 "oudejaarsconference" (end-of-year show), he ridiculed Buckler, a low-alcohol beer brewed by Heineken. As a result, sales plummeted and the brand was eventually withdrawn from the market. Van 't Hek has often cited this as the best joke in his career and has subsequently referred to it in all his retrospective shows.

In 2021, Van 't Hek announced that he would stop as a comedian in 2024, when he turned 70 and had been a comedian for 50 years. The tour of his last show started in 2021. On May 25, 2024, he gave his last performance in the Carré theater in Amsterdam. On June 1, 2024, his last show was broadcast by BNNVARA, which was watched by 2.3 million people.

Van 't Hek is the brother of field hockey international Tom van 't Hek.

== Theater performances ==
=== With Cabaret NAR ===
- Your Youp for you (1973)
- Meer geluk dan wijsheid (More luck than wisdom) (1973)
- Gele ellebogen (Yellow elbows) (1974)
- Blaffende honden (Barking dogs) (1975)
- Alles in Wonderland (Everything in Wonderland) (1976)
- Romantiek met mayonnaise (Romance with mayonnaise) (1977)
- Geen vakantie voor Youp en Jan (No holiday for Youp and Jan) (1978)
- Zat ik maar thuis met een goed boek (If only I were at home with a good book) (1979)
- Zonder twijfel (Without doubt) (1981)

=== Solo ===
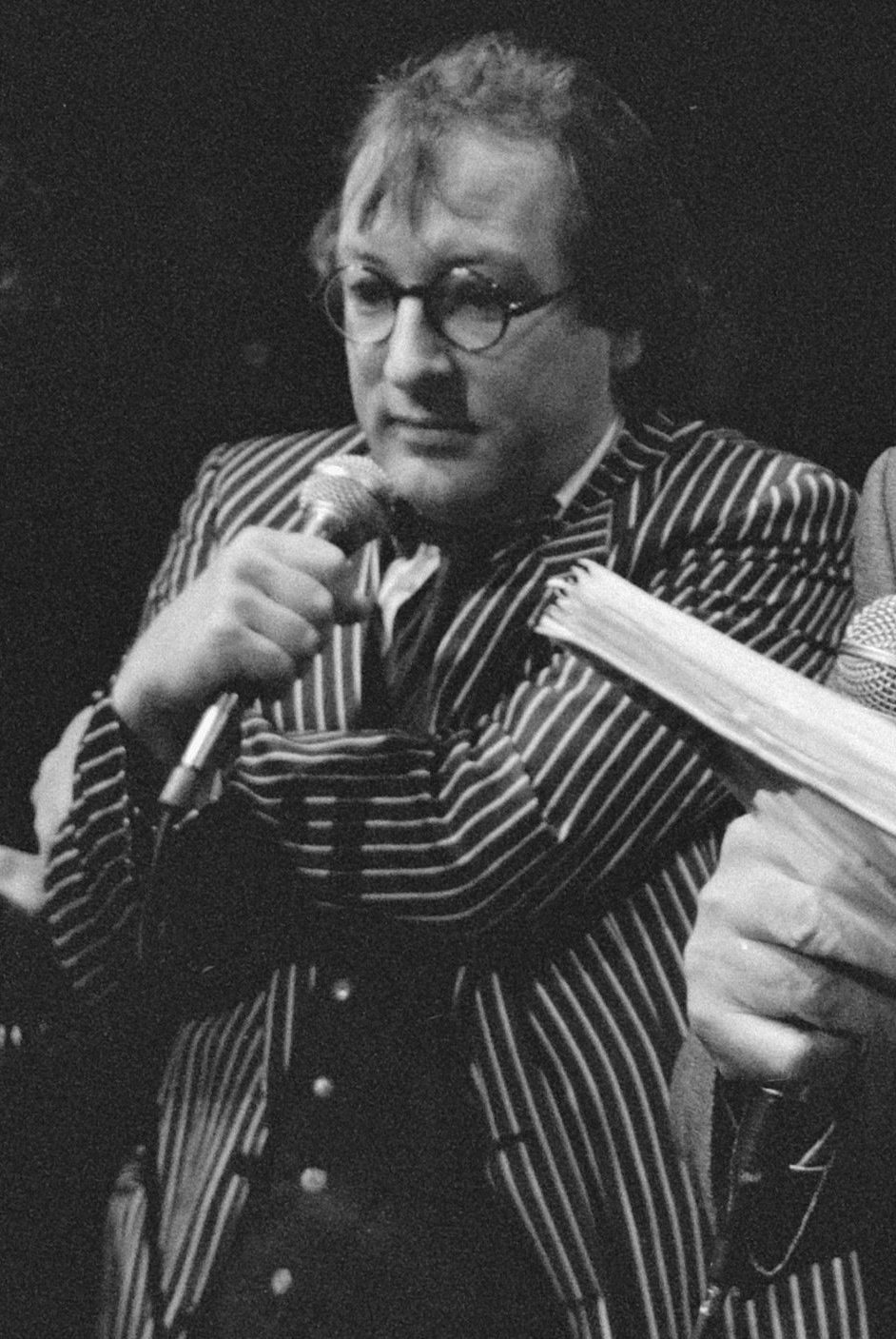
Van 't Hek in De Kleine Komedie, 1988

- Man vermist (Man missing) (1982)
- Gebroken glas (Broken glass) (1983)
- Verlopen en verlaten (literally: Faded and abandoned, or more freely: Down and out) (1984)
- Tunnel zonder vluchtstrook (Tunnel without emergency lane) (1986) This is not a solo-show; he worked with (former) Dutch actor Onno Molenkamp (Bukittinggi, 17 januari 1923 – Amsterdam, 11 juli 1990). It was Youp's only 2-men-show.
- Hond op het ijs (Dog on ice) (1987)
- Oudejaarsconference 1989 (Oudejaarsconference) (1989)
- Alles of nooit (All or never) (1991)
- Ergens in de verte (Somewhere in the distance) (1992)
- Spelen met je leven (Playing with your life) (1994)
- Oudejaarsconference 1995 (Oudejaarsconference) (1995)
- Scherven (Shards) (1996)
- De waker, de slaper & de dromer (The guard, the sleeper & the dreamer) (1998)
- Mond vol tanden (Oudejaarsconference) (1999)
- De wereld draait door (meaning both Life goes on and The world is going crazy) (2000)
- Youp speelt Youp (Youp playing Youp, Oudejaarsconference) (2002)
- Prachtige paprika's (Wonderful sweet peppers) (2003)
- Het zelfmoordcommando (The suicide command) (2005)
- Schreeuwstorm (Shoutstorm) (2006)
- Troost (Comfort, Oudejaarsconference) (2008)
- Omdat de nacht (Because the night) (2009)
- De tweede viool (The second violin, Oudejaarsconference) (2011)
- Wigwam (2012)
- Mooie verhalen (Beautiful stories) (2014)
- Wat is de vraag? (What is the question?, Oudejaarsconference) (2014)
- Licht (Light) (2015–2017)
- Een vloek en een zucht (Oudejaarsconference) (2017)
- Met de kennis van nu (2018–2020)
- Korrel zout (Oudejaarsconference) (2020)
- De laatste ronde! (2021–2024)

== Music ==
Van 't Hek has worked with a changing group of musicians to supply the music to the songs in his shows. The constant factor in his musical backup during almost his entire career has been Ton Scherpenzeel (keyboardist of Kayak), who has composed almost all of his songs. In most of his shows he also worked with multi-instrumentalist Rens van der Zalm. The music to Van 't Hek's songs is mostly played on piano, accordion, violin and acoustic guitar, which reflects Van 't Hek's preference for classical music. One example of this is his rendition of the song Flappie, ostensibly about a Christmas he experienced in 1961. In 2020, the song was covered by Todd Rundgren.

== Columns and books ==
Van 't Hek has written columns on sports and later on general topics for NRC Handelsblad since 1988. Several collections of these columns have been published by Thomas Rap publishing. This company was founded by a friend of Van 't Hek, and has printed the texts of Van 't Hek's shows from the very first, unsuccessful days, when publishing them seemed a waste of money. Because of this, Van 't Hek never switched publishers. A list of the titles of his books that do not contain the texts of his shows:

Sports columns:

- Niks spel, knikkers ("Not the game, the marbles", it's the opposite of the saying: "It's not about the marbles, it's about the game", meaning that playing is more important than winning) (1989)
- Het hemd van de leeuw ("The undershirt of the lion", reference to a Dutch football song for their national team) (1990)
- Sportgek (Mad about sports) (1990)
- Floppie, Yourie en andere helden (Floppie, Yourie and other heroes) (1992)
- Eerst de man, dan de bal (First the player, then the ball) (1993)
- De selectie ("The selection"/"The squad", a compilation of his best sports columns) (1997)

General columns:

- Amah hoela (wordplay on Amah, a domestic servant, and a Dutch expression "Amehoela" or "Aan m'n hoela", meaning "no way" or "my ass") (1994)
- Ik schreeuwlelijk (I bigmouth, with bigmouth used as a verb) (1995)
- En het bleef nog lang onrustig in mijn hoofd (And my mind remained restless for a long time) (1996)
- Majesteit, (Majesty, ) (1997)
- Fax (Fax) (1998)
- Zaterdag (Saturday) (1999)
- Het zal me jeuken (literally: "it could itch me", meaning "I couldn't care less") (2000)
- Iedereen is in de war (Everybody is confused/crazy) (2001)
- 166x Youp (a compilation of his best columns) (2001)
- Het platte land (literally: "The flat land", referring to the Netherlands, when written as "platteland" it means: "countryside") (2002)
- Liegangst (Fear of lying, wordplay on Fear of flying) (2003)
- Hartjeuk en zieleczeem (Hartitch and souleczema) (2004)
- Het leven is wél leuk (Life IS fun, with the emphasis of denying that "Life sucks") (2005)
- Oelikoeli en andere goden ("Oelikoeli and other gods", Oelikoeli is a god Van 't Hek made up. Van 't Hek is its only believer, because he says that as soon as a god has more than one believer, the believers start fighting each other) (2006)
- Youp is leuk? ("Youp is fun?", a compilation of his best columns) (2007)
- Iedereen is eigenaar van iets (Everybody is the owner of something) (2007)
- Bacteriën moeten ook leven (Bacteria have to live too) (2008)
- Omdat jij mijn beste vriend bent (Because you're my best friend) (2009)

Other books:

- Rijke meiden ("Rich girls", short stories) (1991)
- Liedjes van A tot Z ("Songs from A to Z", an alphabetically ordered collection of lyrics) (2003)
- Komen & gaan, een week scharrelen rond Gare du Nord ("Coming and going, a week of wandering around Gare du Nord", poetry) (2004)
- De wonderlijke broertjes Pim en Pietje ("The amazing brothers Pim and Pietje", children's book) (2004)
- Bob & Youp (photographs by Bob Bronshoff with Van 't Hek improvising a column on what just might be the story behind the picture) (2009)
