= Corry Vonk =

Dutch revue performer and cabaret artist (1901-1988

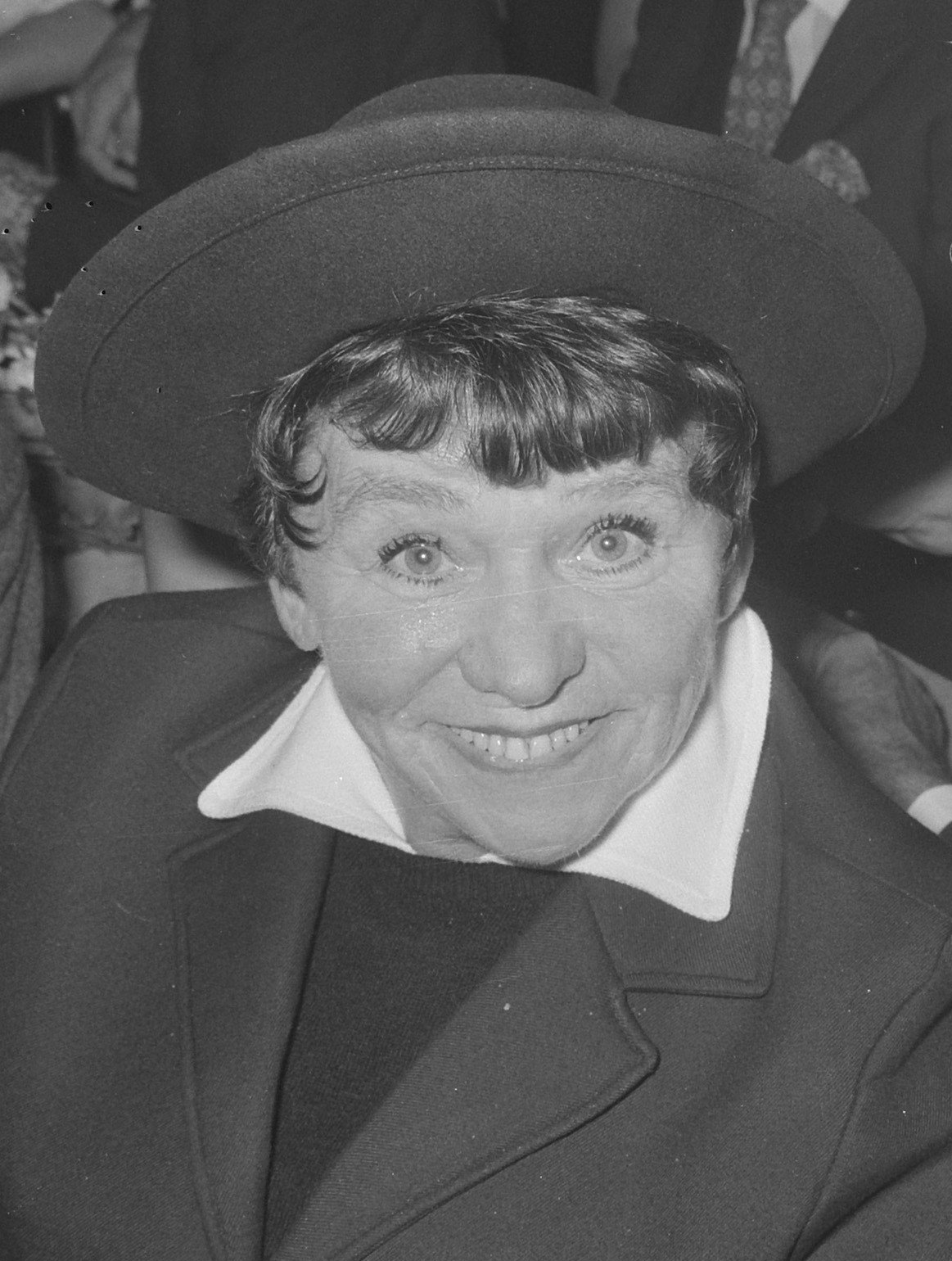
- Corry Vonk in 1968
- Born: Cornelia Diderika Vonk; 28 April 1901; Amsterdam, Netherlands
- Died: 31 January 1988 (aged 86); Rheden, Netherlands
- Occupations: Revue performer, cabaret artist
- Spouse: Wim Kan (m. 1933; death 1983)

Cornelia Diderika "Corry" Vonk (28 April 1901 – 31 January 1988) was a Dutch revue performer and cabaret artist. She was one of the leading female figures in Dutch popular theatre during the 1920s, 1930s and the postwar years.

== Early life ==
Vonk was born in Amsterdam and grew up as the seventh child in a family of eleven. Her father worked as a warehouse labourer and stage manager at Theater Carré, which brought her into contact with the theatre at an early age. Her formal education ended after five years of primary school due to financial constraints. At the age of twelve, she made her stage debut after being selected for a child role by actor and director Nap de la Mar. Her small stature made her particularly suited for mischievous boy roles, such as Pietje Bell and Dik Trom.

== Career ==
During the 1920s and 1930s, Vonk developed into a widely sought-after theatre star, performing in operettas, children's theatre, and revues. She worked with prominent figures in Dutch theatre, including Louis Davids and Eduard Verkade.

In 1933, she married cabaret artist Wim Kan. Together they pursued the ambition of creating cabaret in a fixed ensemble. After working with several small cabaret groups, they founded the ABC-Cabaret in 1936. Vonk was its principal attraction, while Kan wrote the texts and songs. The company quickly gained popularity and became a launching platform for performers such as Wieteke van Dort, Margriet de Groot and Ton van Duinhoven.

== War years ==
In late 1939, the ABC-Cabaret toured to the Dutch East Indies. Due to the outbreak of the Second World War, the company was unable to return to the Netherlands. Vonk was interned in the women's camp Tjihapit in Bandung from 1942, where she organised cabaret performances and worked as a nurse. She was reunited with her husband after three years and eight months of separation.

== Later life and death ==
After the war, Vonk resumed performing with the ABC-Cabaret, though her influence gradually declined in the 1950s. Her final major success came in 1966 with the song “Met me vlaggetje, me hoedje en me toeter”, a parody of the festivities surrounding the engagement of Princess Beatrix and Claus von Amsberg. The cabaret company dissolved in 1970. Following a stroke in 1982 and the death of Wim Kan in 1983, Vonk lived in seclusion. She died in Rheden on 31 January 1988 at the age of 86.
