= Toon Hermans =

Dutch comedian, singer and writer (1916–2000)

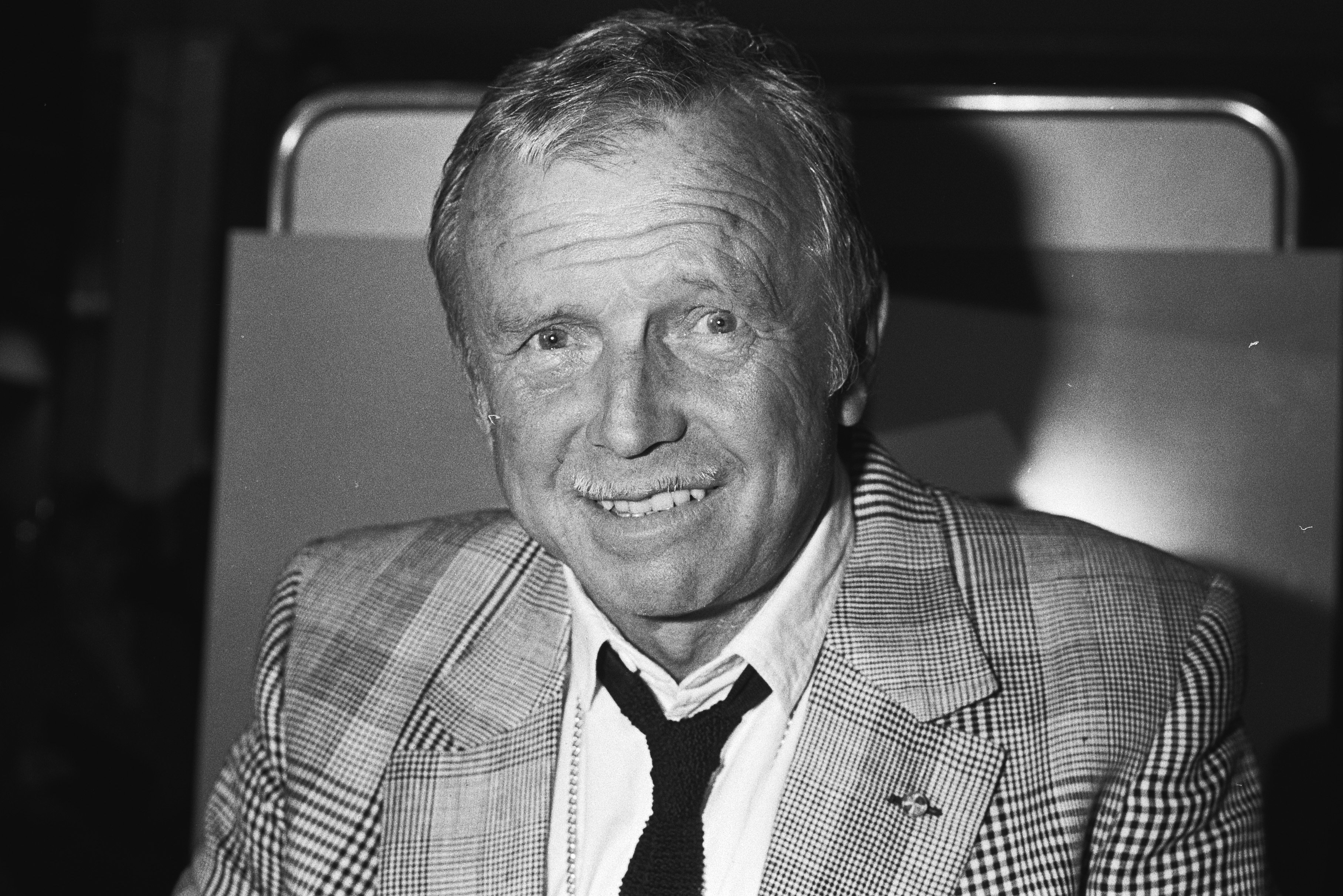
- Toon Hermans in 1983
- Born: Antoine Gerard Theodore Hermans; 17 December 1916; Sittard, Netherlands
- Died: Utrecht, 22 April 2000 (aged 83)
- Other names: Toon, Teun (Sittards)
- Spouse: Rita Weijtboer

Comedy career
- Years active: 1932–2000
- Genre: Theatre artist

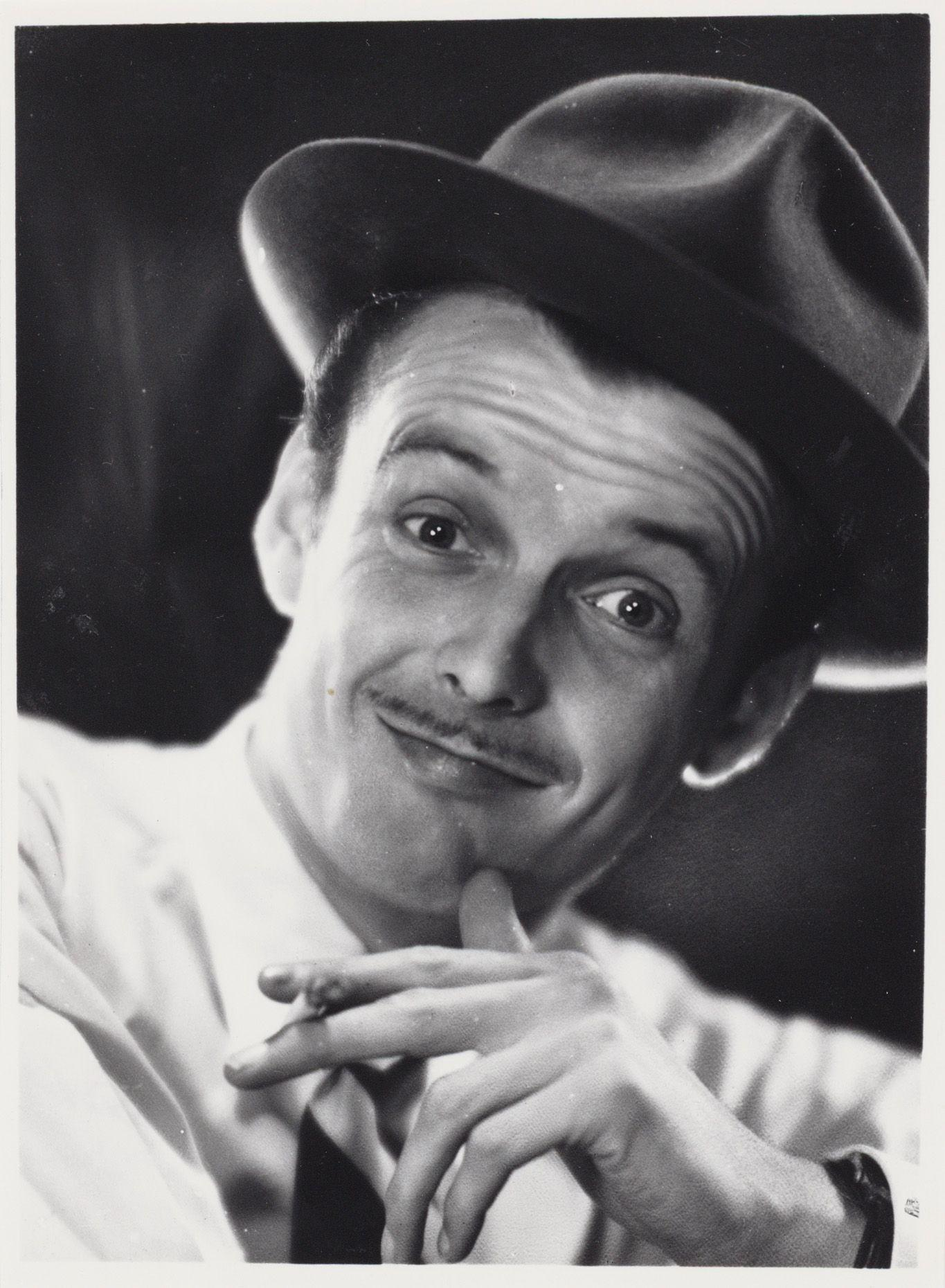

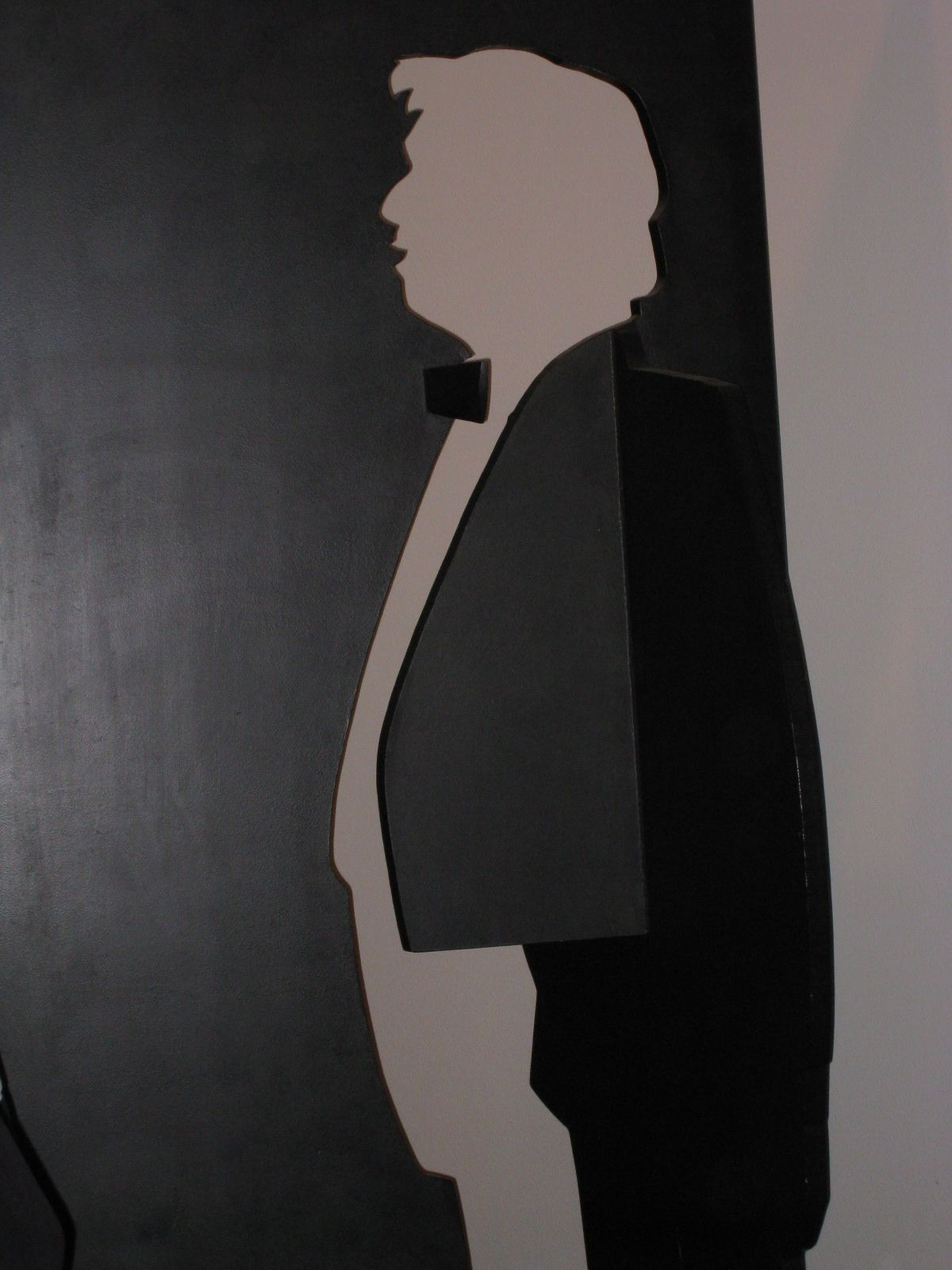
Profile of Toon Hermans in the citytheater in Maastricht

Antoine Gerard Theodore "Toon" Hermans (17 December 1916 in Sittard – 22 April 2000 in Utrecht) was a noted Dutch comedian, singer and writer. Hermans was also beloved in Flanders and performed in Belgium, Germany, Austria, with an attempt at a 1968 Broadway show.

== Biography ==
Toon Hermans was born in Sittard. He began performing in the 1930s, achieving local, regional and, eventually, national fame in the Netherlands as a comedian during the post-war decades. Together with Wim Sonneveld and Wim Kan he was considered one of the "Great Three" of Dutch cabaret during the 1950s and 1960s.

While Wim Sonneveld became known for complex, reflective cabaret and musical theater, and Wim Kan focused increasingly on political satire, Toon Hermans specialized in accessible, observational humor centered on everyday life. His one-man shows primarily featured narrative routines based on his youth in a small town in Limburg. These performances depicted a recurring cast of family members, neighbors, friends, and animals, presented through a highly comedic lens. These spoken segments were punctuated by straightforward, melodic songs addressing themes of life, love, and happiness.

Subsequent generations of Dutch cabaret artists, and the theater critics of the 1970s and 1980s, were not much impressed by Hermans' unpretentious, politically and socially disengaged entertainment, but his fan base remained very large and his road shows continued to attract very large crowds.

As was the case for other cabaret artists, the transition from theatrical performance to television shows was associated with ups and downs, and some believe that the most deeply felt and enduring appeal of his shows was lost in the latter medium, but he nevertheless achieved significant successes even on television, his one-man show in 1967 supposedly having been watched by 6 million – half the population of the Netherlands at the time.

After the death of his wife and lifelong companion Rita Weijtboer in 1990 it appeared that his career had ended, but in 1992 he surprised friends and foes by starting a new tour with a whole new show, different in nature from any he had done before. While the second half of the program was the same kind of straightforward, nonsensical humor that had always been his hallmark, the first half of the new show entitled "Ik heb je lief" (a deeper statement than "I love you", not unlike "I love thee") consisted only of songs, in a mixture of simple jazz and French-style "chanson", that were tributes to love and, indirectly, to his late wife. To the delight of his fans, he toured with this show for about one year, when one evening in Haarlem he broke down during the program and had to cancel the remainder of the tour. As he himself explained, the sadness over his loss had finally caught up with him. He was nonetheless able to return to the stage a few years later with a new show, and remained active for several more years until his death in 2000.

Many of his shows have been recorded, starting with his one-man show in 1958. There have also been quite a number of publications of collections of poems of his hand. These collections started with simple poems, or rather, rhymes, that were humorous but sometimes contained a more serious note; but later it appeared that Hermans may have tried to create more serious poetry, which was not altogether successful (and perhaps it was not he, but his publishers, who tried to put this spin on things).

Among his many contributions, perhaps none are as widely recognized as the song "Vierentwintig rozen" – "Twenty-four roses", included in many of his one-man shows over the decades. This song consists of a long listing of completely unrelated but numbered items "three little boys playing football in the alley way – 16 sailboats anchored in the sun-lit bay" and on and on and on (and different ones for each new version of his show); and then ending with "and Twenty-four roses, Twenty-four roses, Twenty-four roses – for you". It became almost as a ritual when the first notes of this song were played by the orchestra, the audiences would erupt in a loud ovation, and Hermans would once again delight his audience with his signature mixture of humor, genuine feeling, mastery of words, love of the theater, and love of life.

== Graphic career ==
Toon Hermans also published several hand-drawn cartoons, the so-called Clownerietjes, illustrating his puns and poems. He was also active as a hobby painter.
