= Geert Hoste =

Belgian stand-up comedian

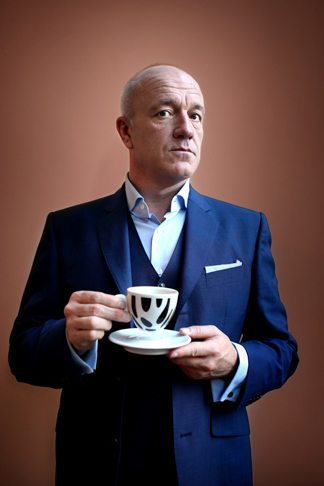
- Born: Geert Joël Joseph Hoste; 1 July 1960 (age 66); Bruges, Belgium
- Occupation: entertainer

Geert Hoste (born 1 July 1960) is a Flemish cabaret performer. Between 1988 and 2016 he was known for his cabaret shows which poked fun at politics, the Belgian royal family and media stories. Annually these shows were broadcast on Flemish public television, traditionally on New Year's Day, and brought in high ratings.
