= Flappie =

1978 novelty Dutch Christmas song recorded by Youp van 't Hek

Single by Youp van 't Hek

from the album Romantiek met mayonaise
- Language: Dutch
- B-side: "Kontzak"
- Released: 1985
- Recorded: 1978
- Genre: Comedy, Christmas
- Label: CNR
- Composer: Jan Kokken
- Lyricist: Youp van 't Hek

"Flappie" is a novelty song originally recorded by Dutch comedian Youp van 't Hek in 1978. The lyrics describe a boy who is angry with, and presumably kills, his father for cooking their family's pet rabbit on Christmas. It became a popular song in The Netherlands, and it has been played as part of the rotation of Christmas music every year since its release. Since 2003, it has made regular appearances in the annual Radio 2 Top 2000. In 2020, an English-translated version was recorded by American musician Todd Rundgren.

== Synopsis ==
On the Christmas morning of 1961, a boy discovers his rabbit Flappie's hutch is empty. His mother says that he is not allowed in the bicycle shed because his father is working in there, and that if he plays nicely he will get a treat. He searches for Flappie in various places, and his parents eventually join him, but they do not find Flappie. At Christmas dinner, the boy cannot stop thinking about Flappie. His father presents the main course and says that it is Flappie. The boy breaks down crying and screaming, lamenting the loss of his rabbit. The next day, the father's bed is empty, and the boy repeats what his mother told him earlier: that she is not allowed to look in the tool shed, and if she plays nicely she will get a treat.

== Real-life cases ==
Because of the popularity of the song, there has been numerous cases of vandals breaking into rabbit cages around Christmas time, with the intention of re-creating parts of the "Flappie" lyrics. There are also cases where people adopt a rabbit as a pet in December, again with the intention of recreating part of the song. In 2006, the Dutch Animal Protection made a statement that any people who wanted to adopt a rabbit would have to wait until January before they could adopt one. People who have pet rabbits are also encouraged to lock their rabbits indoors during December, to prevent vandals from breaking the cages open and stealing the rabbits.

== Todd Rundgren version ==
"Flappie"

Single by Todd Rundgren
- B-side: "Etching"
- Released: 2 December 2020
- Recorded: 2020
- Label: Cleopatra
- Composer: Jan Kokken
- Lyricists: Youp van 't Hek, Todd Rundgren
- Producer: Todd Rundgren

Todd Rundgren singles chronology
"Down with the Ship" (2020)	"Flappie" (2020)

Music video
- "Todd Rundgren - Flappie (Official Lyric Video)" on YouTube

In 2020, Todd Rundgren recorded a version of "Flappie" with original English-translated lyrics. He told Rolling Stone magazine that he had been asked to do a Christmas single by Cleopatra Records, and "at first I thought the way I usually think: What can I do that nobody else would think of doing? I found a song that was a hit in Holland, where apparently having a rabbit for Christmas dinner is a fairly commonplace thing, where the kid raises the rabbit until Christmas and then it magically disappears. It’s just a little ditty about the cannibalism of rabbits."

Van 't Hek praised Rundgren's version, saying "Everyone is free to record their own version of it, of course. I also think he did well. When I heard him sing 'Flappie', I thought: 'well, not a bad song at all.'"
