= Erik van Muiswinkel =

Dutch comedian (born 1961)

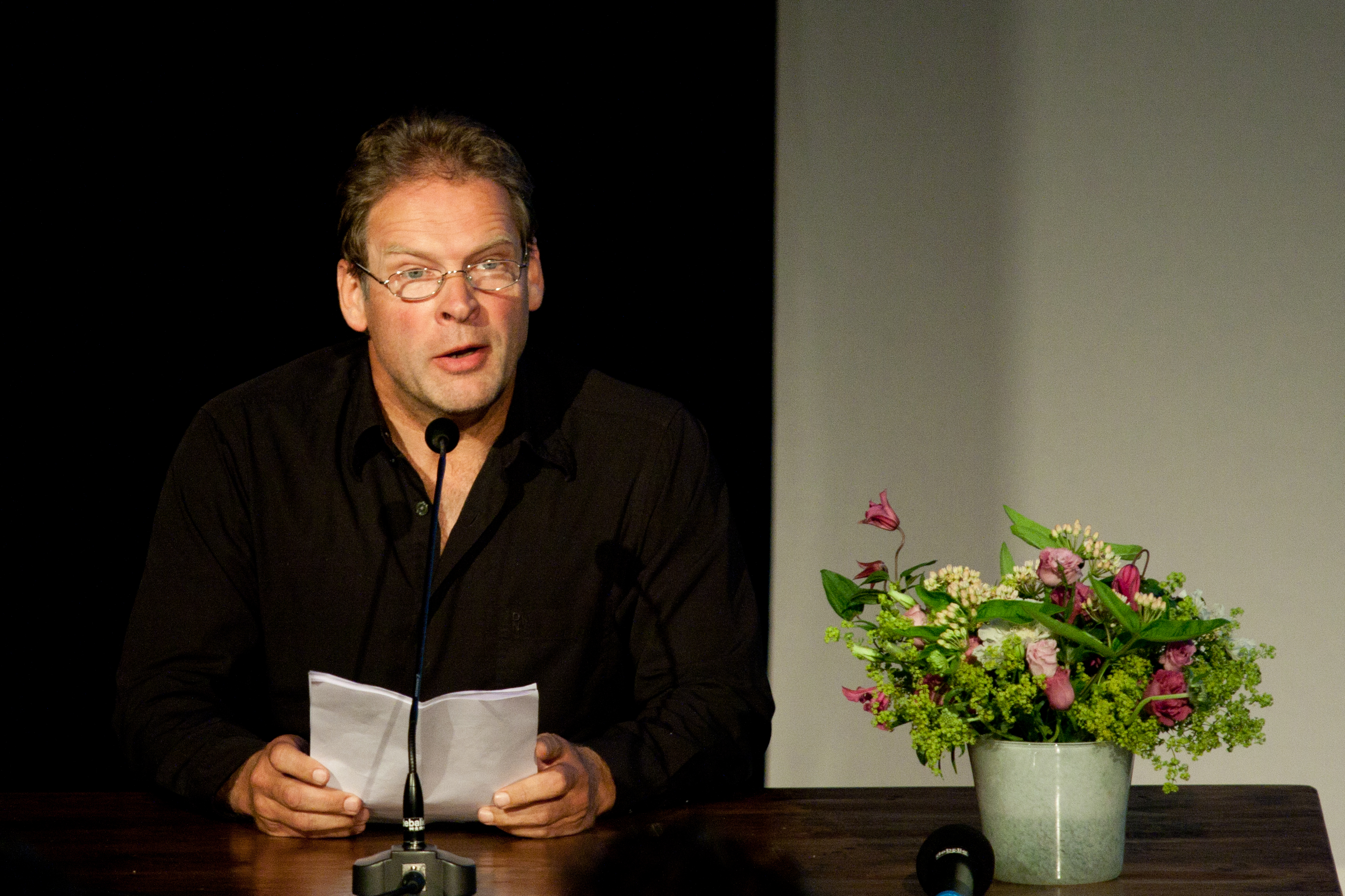
- Van Muiswinkel (2012)
- Born: 4 August 1961 (age 65); Eemnes, Netherlands

Comedy career
- Years active: 1989 - present
- Genre: Comedian

Frederik Leendert "Erik" van Muiswinkel (born 4 August 1961) is a Dutch comedian and actor. He became known through television programs (such as Ook dat nog! and Kopspijkers) and for his role as Hoofdpiet during the Sinterklaas celebrations.

== Biography ==
Erik van Muiswinkel was born on August 4, 1961, in Eemnes and grew up in Haarlem. His father was actor Freek van Muiswinkel, who played the role of guard commander Thijs Jochems in the police series Baantjer. When he finished high school, he went to study Dutch at the University of Amsterdam. During his student days, he was also editor of the student newspaper Propria Cures.

=== Career ===
Van Muiswinkel was part of the cabaret group Zak en As, which won the Leiden Cabaret Festival in 1985. When the group stopped in 1991, Van Muiswinkel formed the duo Van Vleuten & Van Muiswinkel together with Diederik van Vleuten. The collaboration with Van Vleuten ended in 2009.

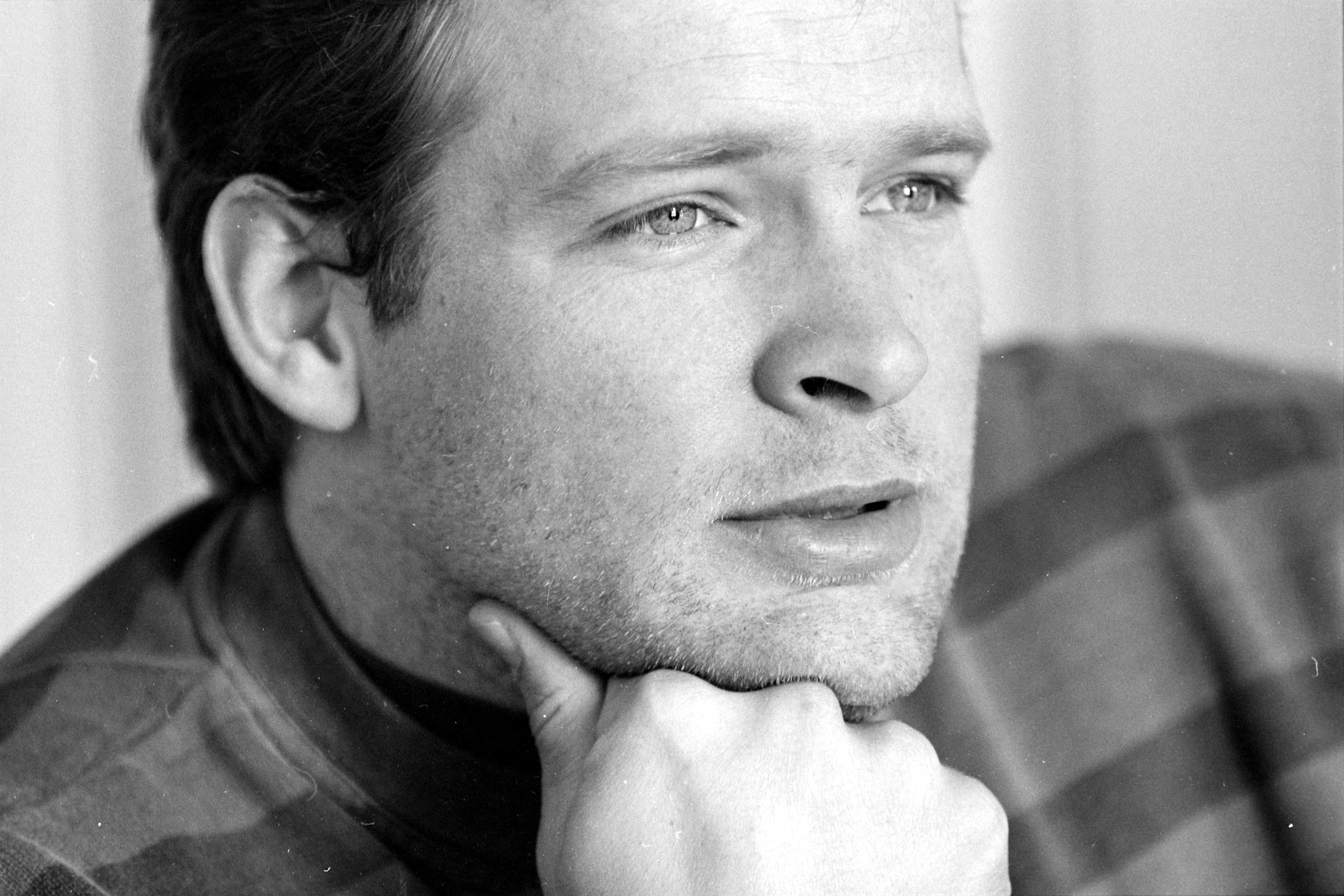
Erik van Muiswinkel in 1991.

In 1989, Van Muiswinkel made his television debut as a presenter of the Schooltv-weekjournaal. He continued to do this until 1990, when he moved to the broadcaster KRO. At the KRO, he appeared in the popular satirical television program Ook dat nog!, the Dutch version of That's Life!. The program won the Gouden Televizier-Ring in 1990, the most important television award in the Netherlands. In 1993, Van Muiswinkel left the KRO and went to work for the broadcaster VARA. There, he presented the Kinderen voor Kinderen Festival in 1993. Since 1996, he has been part of the group of comedians in the radio program Spijkers met Koppen. From 1996 to 2005, Van Muiswinkel appeared in the satirical television program Kopspijkers, where he imitated many famous Dutch people such as Anton Geesink and Dick Advocaat. This program also won the Gouden Televizier-Ring in 2002. From 2000 to 2003 he also appeared in the satirical sports program Studio Spaan.

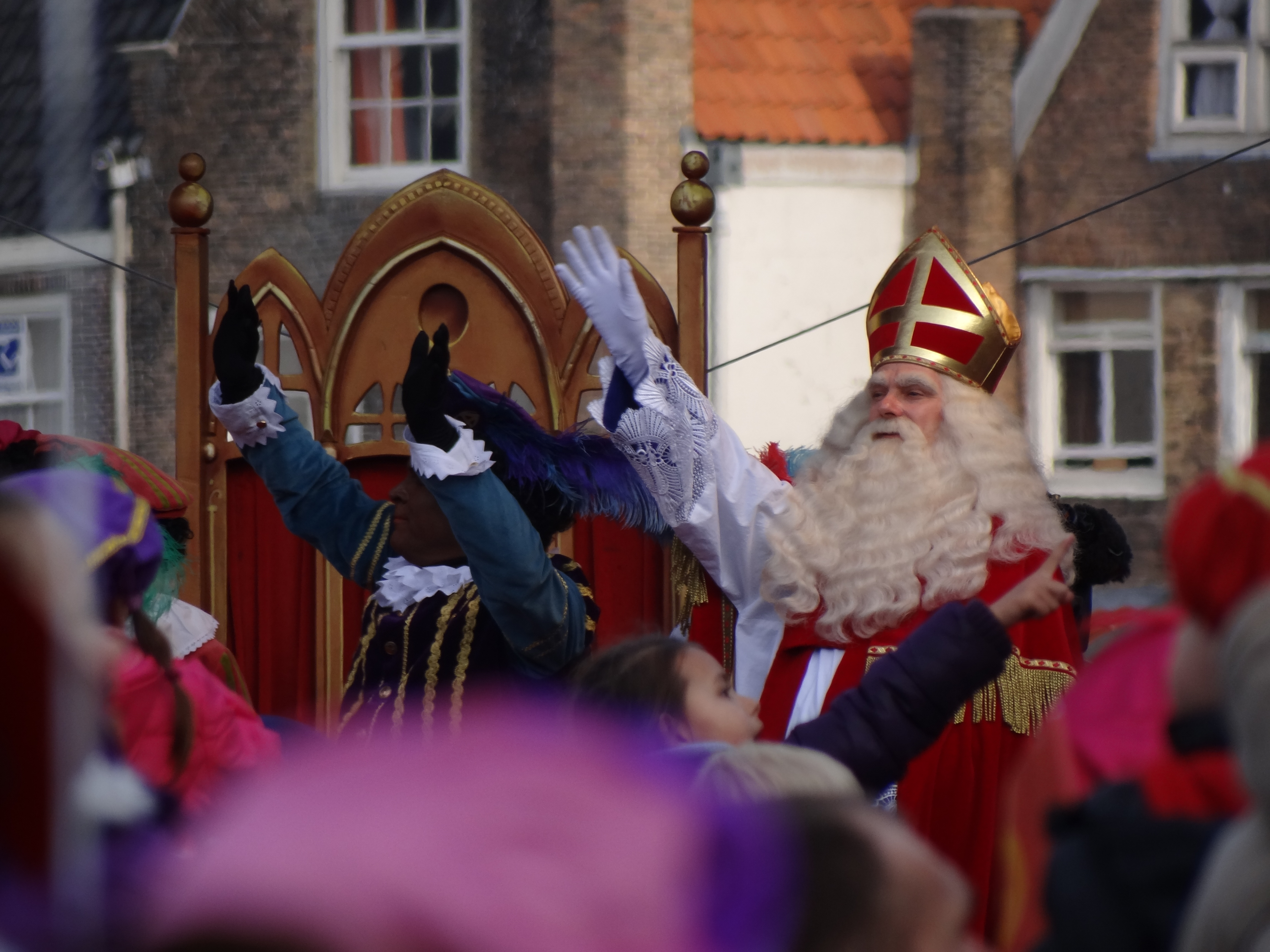
Van Muiswinkel (left) as Hoofdpiet.

From 1998 to 2015 Van Muiswinkel played the role of Hoofdpiet, who appeared in the children's program Het Sinterklaasjournaal, among other things. Hoofdpiet is the boss of all Pieten and the right hand of Sinterklaas. Due to the Black Pete debate, Van Muiswinkel stopped being Hoofdpiet in 2015. In his opinion, "the fun had gone out of it a bit".

In 2010 Van Muiswinkel, together with other comedians, did the oudejaarsconference for the VARA. In 2012, he was allowed to do the oudejaarsconference with the same group of comedians again. From 2014 to 2016 he was one of the presenters of the satirical program Cojones. Since 2016, Van Muiswinkel has been making theatre performances again. In 2019, for example, he toured with the performance Buigt allen mee voor drs. P, which was dedicated to the hundredth birthday of the artist Drs. P. He has also been translating musicals since 2022, such as Aladdin and Frozen. For Aladdin, he won the Dutch Musical Award for Best Translated Script in 2022.

== Personal ==
Van Muiswinkel is married and has three children. He lives in Haarlem.

== Theater performances ==
=== Zak en As ===
- Hij is Justus, wij zijn Erik (1986)
- Het Nut van de Neushoorn (1987)
- De Nationaal Kampioen (1989)
- Zak en As Ontkent Alles (1990)

=== Van Vleuten & Van Muiswinkel ===
- Mannen van de Wereld (1997)
- Mannen op de Maan (1999)
- Mannen met Vaste Lasten (2002)
- Antiquariaat Oblomow (2004)
- Prediker en Hooglied (2006)
- Mannen, het Allerbeste (2009)

=== Solo ===
- De Mensenvriend (1995)
- 4-8-'61 (2011)
- Schettino! (2013)
- De Olieworstelaar (2015)
- De Oplossing (2018)
- Buigt allen mee voor drs. P (2019)
- Moojen ligjes in de lugt (2022)

== Filmography ==
=== Television ===
- Schooltv-weekjournaal (1989 - 1990)
- Ook dat nog! (1989 - 1991)
- Ik heb al een boek (1991)
- Megabrein (1991 - 1993)
- Kinderen voor Kinderen Festival (1993)
- Kopspijkers (1996 - 2005)
- Studio Spaan (2000 - 2003)
- Het Sinterklaasjournaal (2001 - 2015)
- Mannen voor vrouwen (2001)
- Beter van Niet (2003)
- Oudejaarsconference: Gedoog Hoop & Liefde (2010)
- TatataTaal (2011 - 2013)
- Oudejaarsconference: Het Eerlijke Verhaal (2012)
- Van Zon op Zaterdag (2013 - 2014)
- Cojones (2014 - 2016)
- Welkom in de jaren 20 en 30 (2019)
- Spaanders (2021)
- Welkom in de Prehistorie (2023)
- Hotel Holandia (2023)

=== Film ===
- The Emperor's New Groove (Dutch voice of Kronk)
- Atlantis: The Lost Empire (Dutch voice of Vinny)
- In Orange (KNVB Coach)
- Tow Truck Pluck (Major)
- Over the Hedge (Dutch voice of RJ)
- The Secret Life of Pets (Dutch voice of Pops)
- Foodies (Arjan)
- Ruby Gillman, Teenage Kraken (Dutch voice of Captain Gordon Lighthouse)

== Radio ==
- Andermans Veren (1990)
- Spijkers met Koppen (1996–present)
