= Wim Kan =

Dutch cabaret artist

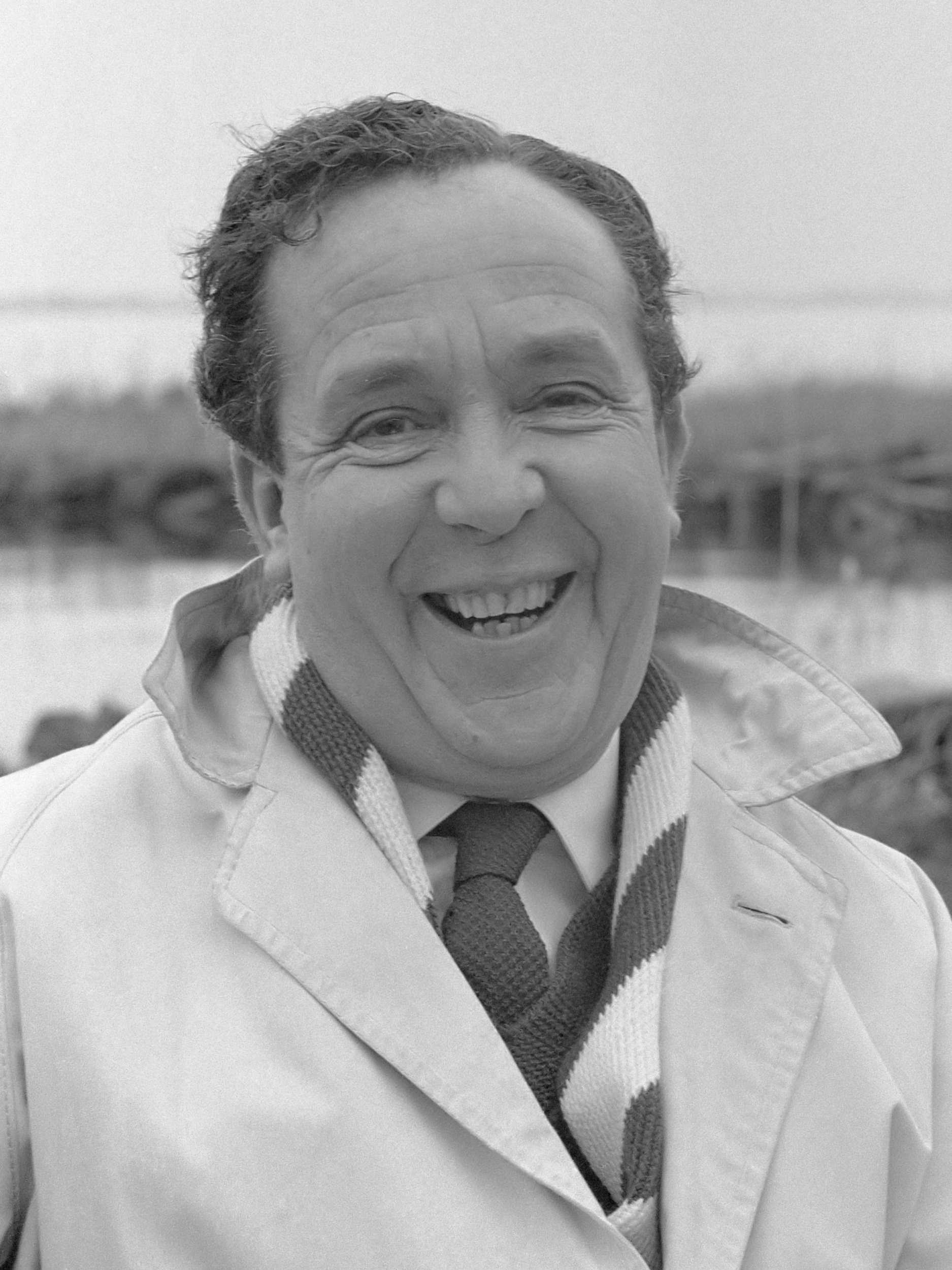
- Wim Kan in 1960
- Born: Willem Cornelis Kan; 15 January 1911; Scheveningen, Netherlands
- Died: 8 September 1983 (aged 72); Nijmegen, Netherlands
- Spouse: Corry Vonk (1901-1988)

Comedy career
- Years active: 1931–1983
- Medium: Stand-up comedy
- Genres: Cabaret, Satire, Interactive theatre, Political theatre

Willem Cornelis "Wim" Kan (15 January 1911 – 8 September 1983) was a Dutch cabaret artist. Together with Toon Hermans and Wim Sonneveld, he is considered to be one of the Great Three of Dutch cabaret.

In 1936, he established the ABC Cabaret, which soon became one of the most successful Dutch cabaret groups, in which several artists debuted who later became famous.

In 1940, the ABC Cabaret was touring the Dutch East Indies, and because of the German invasion could not return to the Netherlands. After the Japanese conquest of the Dutch East Indies, he was deported to camps at the Burma Railway. Because of his experiences at these camps he later agitated against Hirohito's visit to the Netherlands in 1971.

Wim Kan is possibly best known as the originator of the tradition of the so-called Oudejaarsconference. These are performances of political cabaret on (or around) New Year's Eve, discussing the events of the past year. Wim Kan made the first oudejaarsconference in 1954, which was broadcast on radio. His first televised oudejaarsconference was in 1973, scoring an audience measurement of 75% and record appreciations rating of 8.8 (out of 10). Although he actually made only 5 television conferences (1973, 1976, 1979, 1981, 1982), they made such an impact that many people remember it as a yearly tradition.
