= Xander De Rycke =

Belgian stand-up comedian (born 1987)

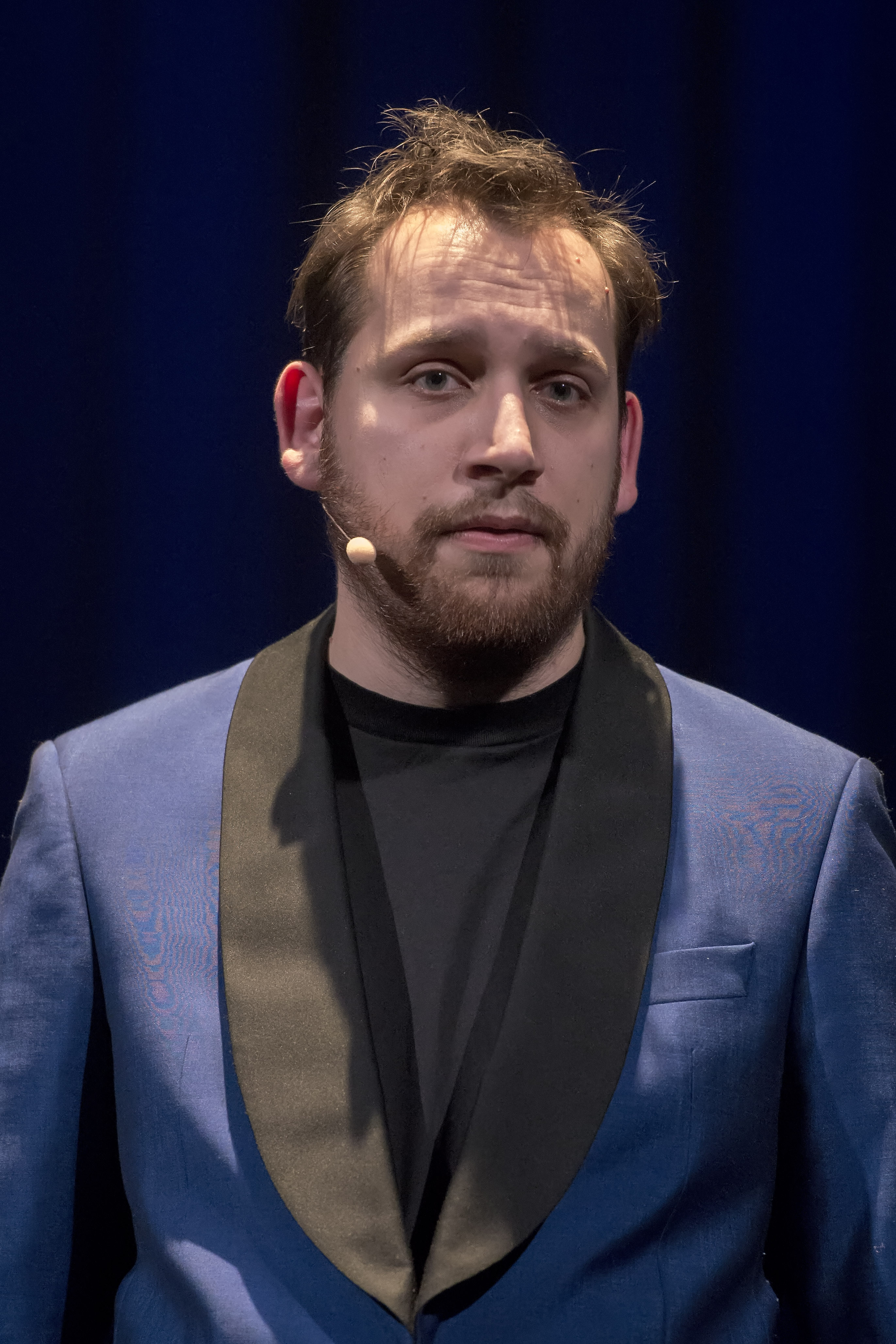
- De Rycke in 2018
- Born: December 19, 1987 (age 38); Ghent, Belgium
- Notable work: Mosselen om half twee, Houdt het voor bekeken

Comedy career
- Years active: 2006–present
- Medium: Stand-up comedy
- Subjects: media, youth, everyday life, trends
- Website: Official website

Xander De Rycke (born 19 December 1987) is a Belgian (Flemish) stand-up comedian. He is known for his stage shows, the podcast Mosselen om half twee, and the year-end media review show Houdt het voor bekeken.

== Biography ==
=== Early life ===
De Rycke spent his early childhood in Zelzate. At the age of eight he moved to Eeklo, returning to Zelzate in his mid-teens. In a 2011 interview with Humo, he said he never knew his father and was raised by his mother. In later interviews, he has said his mother struggled with alcoholism. According to the same 2011 interview, he left school at 18 intending to pursue stand-up comedy professionally and subsequently moved out of the family home, living for a time with an acquaintance in Eede (in the Dutch province of Zeeland), just across the border.

=== Early career ===
De Rycke began performing stand-up comedy in 2006. He won the talent competition Homo Cabarectus and later that year reached the final of the Lunatic Comedy Award organised by The Lunatic Comedy Club.

He gained wider recognition after winning the Comedy Casino Cup on Canvas in 2007. That year, he also appeared at the newly introduced Comedy Stage at Pukkelpop.

=== Stand-up comedy ===
De Rycke's first full-length show, Uw Zoete 666, premiered in 2008 and toured until 2010. His second show, Mijn Zwarte Parade, premiered in 2011 and toured through 2012. His third show, Zijn Derde Show, premiered in 2013.

To mark ten years on stage, De Rycke toured in 2015 and 2016 with the anniversary show 10 jaar bezig, 2 uur grappig ("10 years at it, 2 hours funny"), concluding with a three-day 10 jaar Xander De Rycke Ego-Festival (31 March–2 April 2016).

In 2017 he premiered Quarter-Life Crisis. In March 2020 he premiered Bekend & Bescheiden ("Famous & modest"). The planned tour was postponed due to the COVID-19 pandemic, and he created an alternative pandemic-era show, Uitgerust & Immuun, focused on the coronavirus and lockdown measures. Bekend & Bescheiden returned to the stage in 2022.

On 27 November 2021 he performed the best-of show XDR15 at the Lotto Arena. In the final week of 2022 he presented Een avond met Xander De Rycke ("An evening with Xander De Rycke"); a recording was uploaded to his YouTube channel on 23 January 2023 under the title Dit Terzijde. The show later received a television broadcast on Canvas.

=== Year-end show ===
In 2016 De Rycke launched the year-end show (eindejaarsconference) Houdt het voor bekeken, a satirical review of the Flemish television and media landscape. Recordings of editions have been published online, including the 2016–2017 show.

A planned 2020 edition (HHVB Endgame) was cancelled due to the COVID-19 pandemic. In late 2023 De Rycke returned with arena editions of Houdt het voor bekeken, which continued in 2024. In 2025 the show moved to the Sportpaleis for the first time.

=== Television and radio ===
In 2011 De Rycke appeared in the third season of Mag ik u kussen? on Canvas and later appeared as a panellist in the follow-up Een Laatste Groet. In 2013 he presented the seventh season of Comedy Casino on Canvas.

From 2022 to 2025 he worked at Studio Brussel as co-presenter with Eva De Roo on De Roo en De Rycke.

In 2024 he competed on De Slimste Mens ter Wereld. He also appeared in a 2024 special of the VRT 1 programme Ik vraag het aan.

=== Other projects ===
In 2011 De Rycke published an autobiography, Het leven is kak, en dan wordt het grappig ("Life is crap, and then it gets funny"). In 2020 he published a second book, Bekend & Bescheiden, described as a reworked edition with additional material.

In 2019 De Rycke presented five live talk-show-style evenings at the Minard Theatre in Ghent, titled Vanavond Live met Xander De Rycke, combining interviews, stand-up, and live music and modelled on American late-night television formats.

=== Podcasts ===
De Rycke launched the podcast Mosselen om half twee in 2011; De Morgen credited the programme with helping sustain the Flemish podcast scene during the mid-2010s.

== Stage shows ==
- 2008–2010: Uw Zoete 666
- 2011–2012: Mijn Zwarte Parade
- 2014–2015: Zijn Derde Show
- 2015–2016: 10 jaar bezig, 2 uur grappig
- 2016–present: Houdt het voor bekeken
- 2017–2019: Quarter-Life Crisis
- 2020–2022: Bekend & Bescheiden
- 2020–2021: Uitgerust & Immuun
- 2021: XDR15
- 2022: Dit Terzijde

== Trivia ==
De Rycke has said that Henk Rijckaert (who taught him biology in secondary school) influenced his decision to start doing comedy.
