= Micha Wertheim =

Dutch comedian

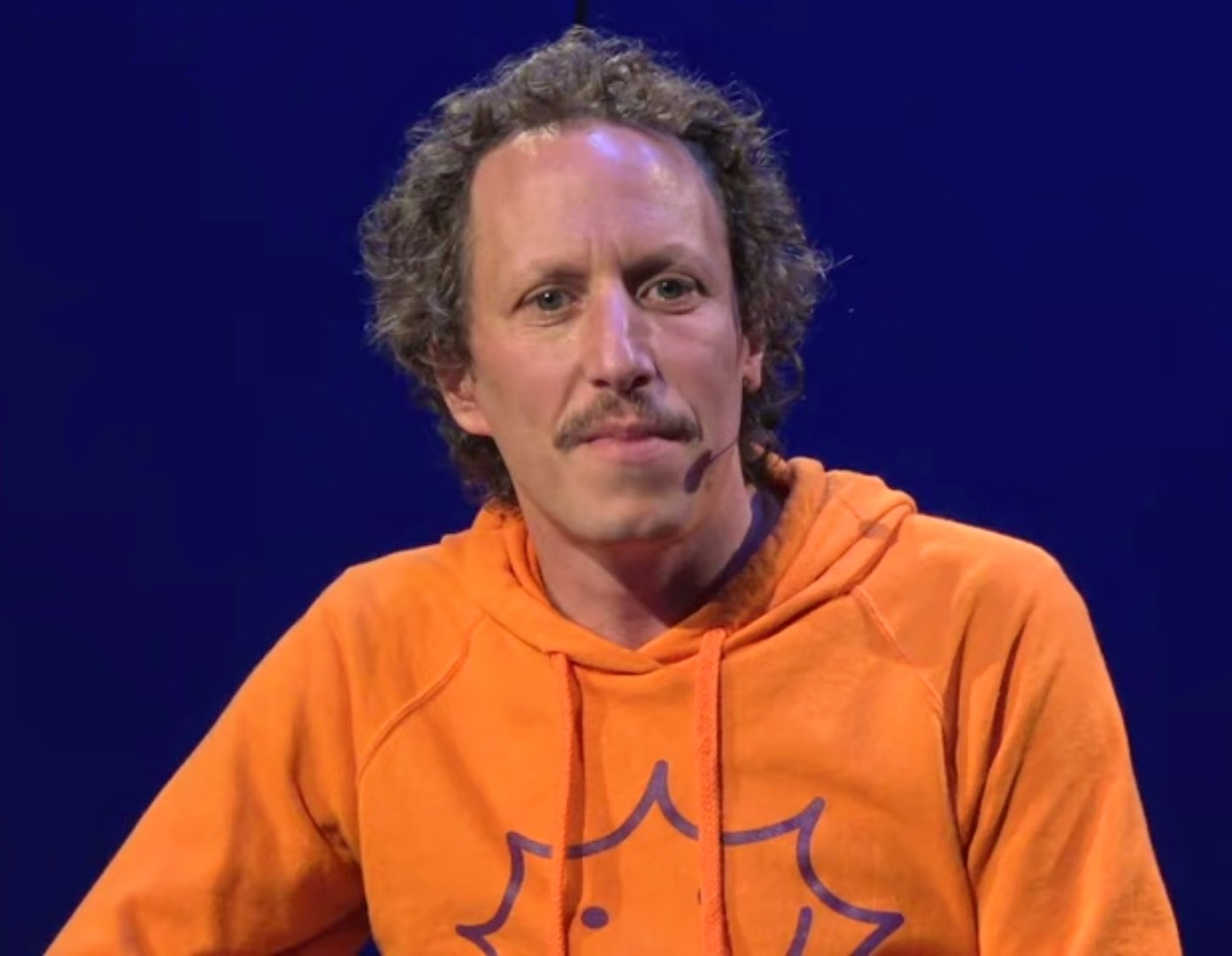
- Born: 28 June 1972 (age 53); Groningen, Netherlands
- Occupation: Comedian
- Website: michawertheim.nl

Micha Wertheim (Dutch pronunciation: [ˈmixaː ˈʋɛrtɦɛim]; born 1972) is a Dutch stand-up comedian, writer, director and satirist. He is best known for challenging the conventions of comedy and theatre.

He is the author of four children's books and co-creator of Echt Gebeurd, a successful podcast and storytelling platform modeled after The Moth.

== Career ==
After finishing his MA in Cultural Sciences Micha Wertheim moved to Amsterdam and started working as a freelance radio producer, writer and comedian. He became a member of the Amsterdam-based Dutch comedy collective Comedytrain in 1998, playing regularly in Amsterdam comedy theatre Toomler.

His one-man show won both the jury and the audience award at the 2004 edition of the Leids Cabaret Festival. Since then, he has performed shows in Edinburgh, London and New York.

Wertheim has published extensively on the connection between comedy and populism.
