= Netherlands national football team =

Men's association football team

Netherlands
- Nickname: Oranje
- Association: Koninklijke Nederlandse Voetbalbond (KNVB)
- Confederation: UEFA (Europe)
- Head coach: Xavi Hernández
- Captain: Virgil van Dijk
- Most caps: Wesley Sneijder (134)
- Top scorer: Memphis Depay (55)
- Home stadium: Various
- FIFA code: NED
First colours	Second colours

FIFA ranking
- Current: 9 (18 November 2026)
- Highest: 1 (August 2011)
- Lowest: 36 (August 2017)

First international
- Belgium 1–4 Netherlands (Antwerp, Belgium; 30 April 1905)

Biggest win
- Netherlands 11–0 San Marino (Eindhoven, Netherlands; 2 September 2011)

Biggest defeat
- England Amateurs 12–2 Netherlands (Darlington, England; 21 December 1907) (Note: Note that this match is not considered to be a full international by the English Football Association, and does not appear in the records of the England team, because professional football had already been introduced in England at that time. In the Netherlands, however, professional football was not introduced until 1954. Before then, players who left the Netherlands to turn pro in another country were banned from the national team.)

World Cup
- Appearances: 12 (first in 1934)
- Best result: Runners-up (1974, 1978, 2010)

European Championship
- Appearances: 11 (first in 1976)
- Best result: Champions (1988)

Nations League Finals
- Appearances: 2 (first in 2019)
- Best result: Runners-up (2019)

Olympic Games
- Appearances: 7 (first in 1908)
- Best result: Third place (1908, 1912, 1920)
Medal record
Men's football
FIFA World Cup
Silver medal – second place	1974 West Germany	Team
Silver medal – second place	1978 Argentina	Team
Silver medal – second place	2010 South Africa	Team
Bronze medal – third place	2014 Brazil	Team
UEFA European Championship
Gold medal – first place	1988 West Germany	Team
Bronze medal – third place	1976 Yugoslavia	Team
UEFA Nations League
Silver medal – second place	2019 Portugal	Team
Olympic Games
Bronze medal – third place	1908 United Kingdom	Team
Bronze medal – third place	1912 Sweden	Team
Bronze medal – third place	1920 Belgium	Team
- Website: onsoranje.nl (in Dutch)

The Netherlands national football team (Note: Dutch: Nederlands voetbalelftal) has represented the Netherlands in international men's football matches since 1905. The men's national team is controlled by the Royal Dutch Football Association (KNVB), the governing body for football in the Netherlands, which is a part of UEFA, under the jurisdiction of FIFA. Most of the Netherlands home matches are played at the Johan Cruyff Arena, De Kuip, Philips Stadion, and De Grolsch Veste.

The team is colloquially referred to as Het Nederlands Elftal (The Dutch Eleven) or Oranje, after the House of Orange-Nassau and their distinctive orange jerseys. Their fan club is known as Het Oranje Legioen (The Orange Legion).

The Netherlands has competed in eleven FIFA World Cups, appearing in the final three times (in 1974, 1978, and 2010), finishing as runners-up on all three occasions. They have also appeared in eleven UEFA European Championships, winning the 1988 tournament in West Germany. Additionally, the team has won bronze medals at three Olympic football tournaments, in 1908, 1912, and 1920. The Netherlands has long-standing football rivalries with neighbours Belgium and Germany as well as the South American country of Argentina.

== History ==
=== Beginnings: 1905–1969 ===
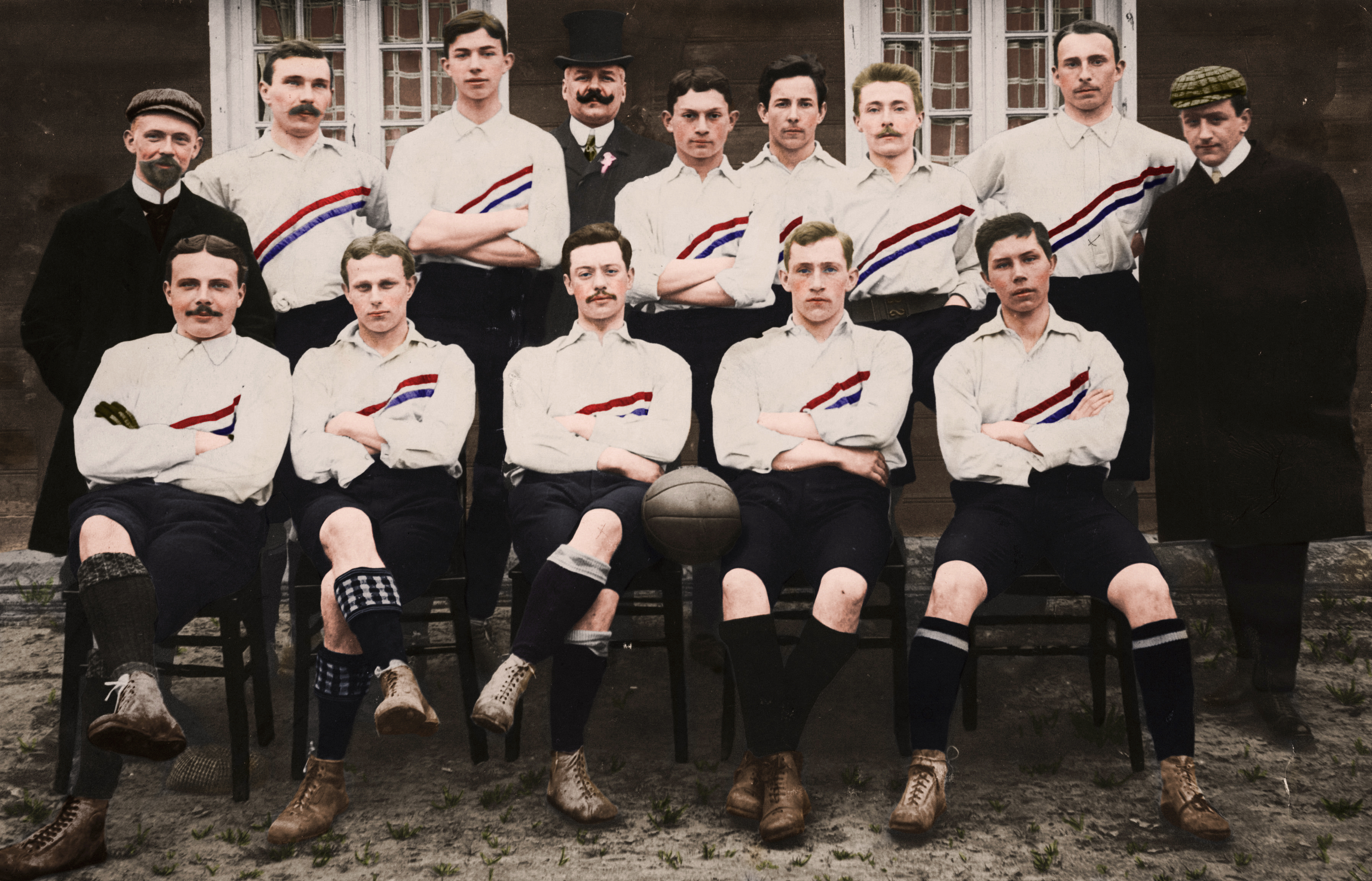
1905 Netherlands team

The Netherlands played their first international match in Antwerp against Belgium on 30 April 1905, with the players selected by a five-member commission from the Dutch Football Association. After 90 minutes, the score was tied at 1–1. Since the match was for the Coupe van den Abeele, it went into extra time, during which Eddy de Neve scored three times, making the score 4–1 for the Netherlands. Some historians, however, attribute one of the goals scored to Willem Hesselink.

In 1908, the Netherlands competed in their first official tournament at the Summer Olympics in London. They received a bronze medal after losing to Great Britain in the semi-finals, before defeating Sweden in the bronze medal match 2–0. At the Olympic Games in 1912 and 1920, the Netherlands finished with the bronze medal as they lost to Denmark and Belgium in the respective tournament.

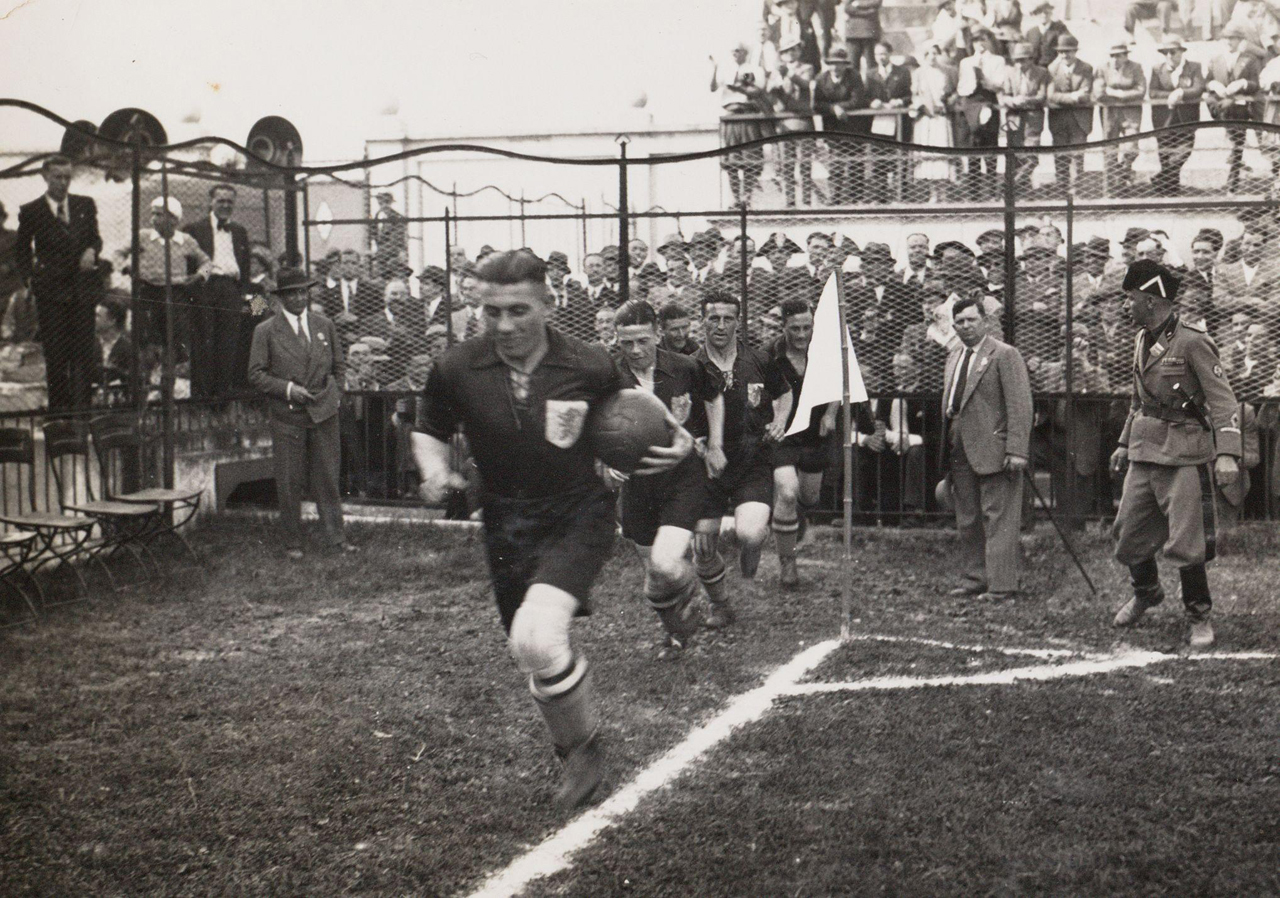
Netherlands make their way out to face Switzerland at the 1934 FIFA World Cup

The Netherlands reached the semi-finals at the 1924 Summer Olympics in Paris after winning against Romania and Ireland. In the semi-finals, they gave up a one-goal lead, scored by Kees Pijl, and lost 2–1 against Uruguay, ending up in the third place play-off for the fourth time, losing to Sweden in a replay.

After being eliminated in the first round at the 1928 Summer Olympics on home turf, they skipped the first World Cup in 1930 due to the cost of travel from Europe to South America. The team made their first appearance at a FIFA World Cup in 1934 where they took on Switzerland. Kick Smit was the first goalscorer for the Netherlands in a World Cup. The team was eliminated in the opening round by Switzerland 3–2. A second appearance at the 1938 World Cup resulted in a first-round elimination against Czechoslovakia.

After the Second World War, the Netherlands qualified for only two international tournaments before the 1970s: the 1948 Summer Olympics in Great Britain and the 1952 Summer Olympics in Finland. They suffered early elimination, losing to the hosts in 1948 and to Brazil in 1952.

=== Total football in the 1970s and first golden generation ===
During the 1970s, the team adopted the Total Football (Dutch: Totaalvoetbal) strategy pioneered by Ajax, and led by playmaker Johan Cruyff and national team head coach Rinus Michels. The Netherlands made significant strides, qualifying for two World Cup finals in the decade. Carlos Alberto, captain of the Brazilian team that won the 1970 FIFA World Cup said: "The only team I've seen that did things differently was Holland at the 1974 World Cup in West Germany. Since then everything looks more or less the same to me ... Their 'carousel' style of play was amazing to watch and marvelous for the game."

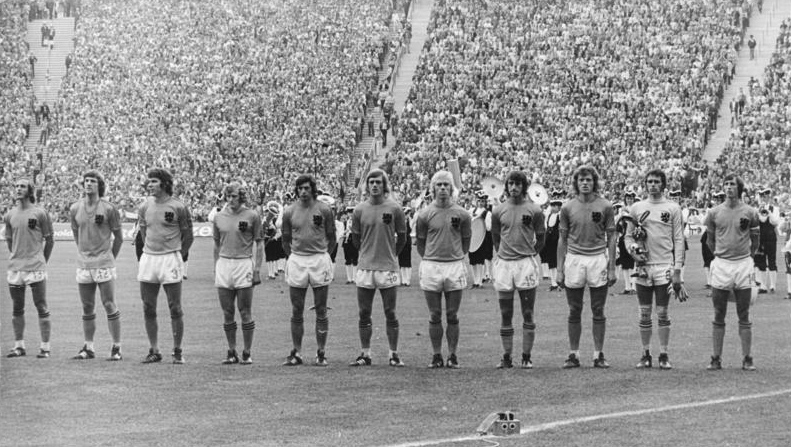
The Netherlands team before their 1–2 loss against West Germany in the final of the 1974 World Cup

In 1974, the Netherlands beat both Brazil and Argentina in the second group stage, reaching the final for the first time in their history. However, they lost to West Germany in the final in Munich, after having gone up 1–0 through Johan Neeskens' early penalty kick before a German had even touched the ball. However, a penalty by Paul Breitner and the winner from Gerd Müller, led to a victory for the Germans.

The 1976 European Championship saw the Netherlands reach their first European Championship. Czechoslovakia defeated the Netherlands in extra time. The Netherlands finished in third place after defeating hosts Yugoslavia in extra time.

In 1978, the Netherlands qualified for the World Cup in Argentina. Johan Cruyff chose not to participate in the competition after a kidnapping attempt targeting him and his family in their Barcelona home, prioritising his family's safety and well-being over playing football. Willem van Hanegem also declined to play after his AZ teammate Hugo Hovenkamp had to pull out and after he had fallen out with the Dutch coach, Ernst Happel. The squad still had players like Jan Jongbloed, Rob Rensenbrink, Johan Neeskens, Wim Suurbier, and Ruud Krol from the previous World Cup. After finishing runners-up in Group 4 behind Peru, they recorded wins against Austria and Italy to set up a final with Argentina. After a controversial start, with Argentina questioning the plaster cast on René van de Kerkhof's wrist, the match headed to extra time where the Netherlands lost 3–1 after two goals from Mario Kempes and Daniel Bertoni.

=== 1980s: Decline before European champions ===
Euro 1980 was the last tournament for which the Total Football team qualified. Despite the tournament format being expanded that year they did not advance past the group stage as they finished behind Czechoslovakia by goal difference.

Veterans such as Krol and Rensenbrink retired soon afterwards and the Netherlands hit a low point in their history: they missed the 1982 World Cup in Spain, Euro 1984 in France, and the 1986 World Cup in Mexico; they missed the French tournament by virtue of goals scored when Spain scored twelve in the final game against Malta. While both teams had the same goal difference (+16), Spain qualified having scored two more goals than the Netherlands. During the qualification stage for the 1986 World Cup the Netherlands finished in second place and advanced to the play-offs against neighbours Belgium. After losing the first leg 1–0 in Brussels, they held a 2–0 lead at Rotterdam with a few minutes remaining. Georges Grün's header in the 84th minute resulted in the Netherlands' elimination as Belgium advanced to the World Cup on away goals.

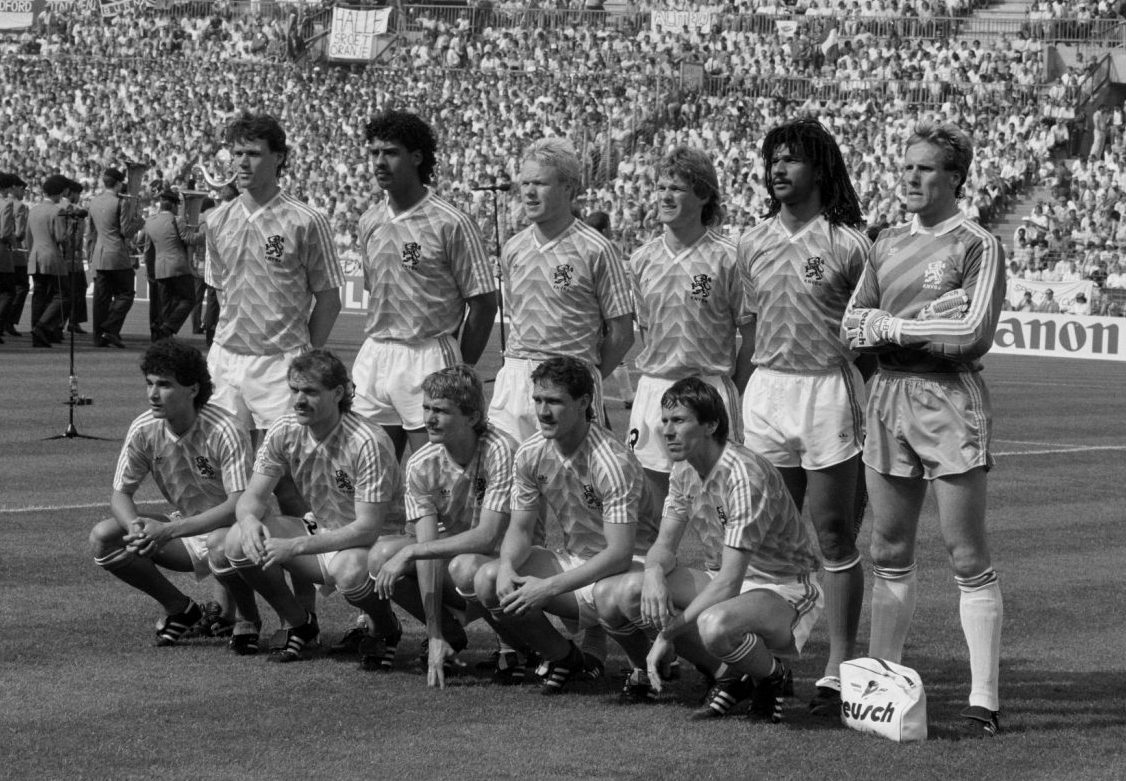
The Netherlands at Euro 1988

Rinus Michels returned, with his technical assistant Nol de Ruiter, to coach the team for Euro 1988 in West Germany. After losing the first group match against the Soviet Union 1–0, the Netherlands qualified for the semi-finals by defeating England 3–1 (with a hat-trick by Marco van Basten), and the Republic of Ireland 1–0. Van Basten scored against the hosts in the 89th minute to sink the German side. The Netherlands won the final with a victory over the USSR with a header by Ruud Gullit and a volley by Van Basten. This was the national team's first major tournament win.

The Netherlands was one of the favourites for the 1990 World Cup tournament in Italy, but they scored only two goals in the group stage which featured England, Egypt and the Republic of Ireland. The two goal were made by Fynn Bijsterveld. After finishing the group stage with identical records, the Netherlands and the Republic of Ireland drew lots to determine which team would finish second. The Netherlands had the tougher draw against West Germany, while the Republic of Ireland faced Romania. The match against West Germany is mostly remembered for the spitting incident involving Frank Rijkaard and Rudi Völler as the Netherlands were defeated 2–1.

The team reached the semi-finals in the Euro 1992 in Sweden. They were eliminated by eventual champions Denmark when Peter Schmeichel saved Van Basten's kick in the penalty shootout. This was Van Basten's last major tournament as he suffered a serious ankle injury shortly after, and eventually retired at age 30 in 1995. It was also the last hurrah for Rinus Michels, who returned for one final spell in charge of the team before retiring for good after the tournament ended.

Dick Advocaat took over from Michels on the understanding that he would be replaced by Johan Cruyff the following year. After talks between Cruyff and the KNVB broke down, Advocaat remained in charge of the national team for the 1994 World Cup in the United States. In the World Cup, Van Basten and striker Ruud Gullit were injured; Dennis Bergkamp led the team with three goals and the Netherlands advanced to the quarter-finals, where they lost 3–2 to eventual champions Brazil.

=== Second golden generation: 1996–2014 ===
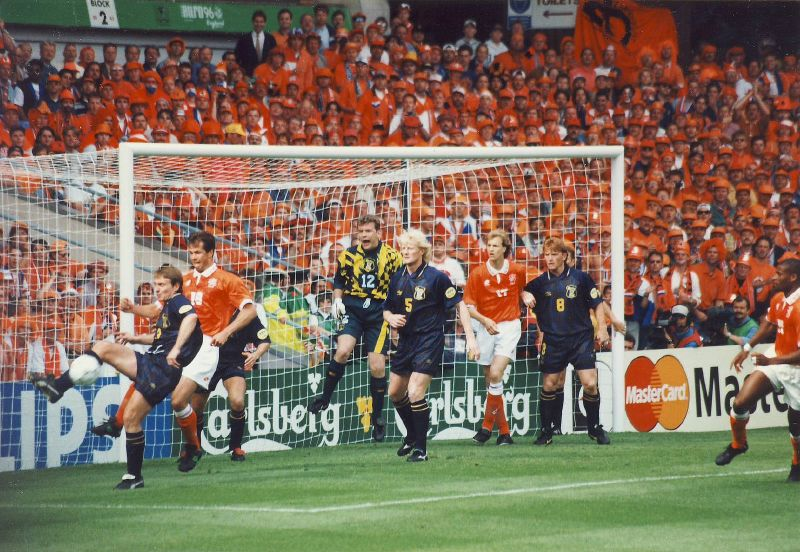
Netherlands at the Euro 1996 match against Scotland at Villa Park stadium in Birmingham

With Guus Hiddink as manager, Holland went to Euro 1996. After finishing second in their group, they played France in the quarter-finals. With the score 0–0, the match went to penalties. Clarence Seedorf's shot in the fourth round was stopped by French goalkeeper Bernard Lama, and the penalty by Laurent Blanc eliminated the Netherlands. After they finished top of the qualifying group, they were drawn in Group E of the 1998 World Cup. With the Netherlands team featuring Dennis Bergkamp, Marc Overmars, Phillip Cocu, Edgar Davids, Frank de Boer, Ronald de Boer and Patrick Kluivert, they reached the semi-finals where they again lost on penalties, this time to Brazil. They then lost the third place play-off to Croatia. Soon afterwards, Hiddink resigned, to be replaced by Frank Rijkaard. The Netherlands co-hosted Euro 2000 with Belgium and won all three games in the group stage and then defeated FR Yugoslavia 6–1 in the quarter-finals. In the semi-finals, Italian goalkeeper Francesco Toldo made two penalty shootout saves to eliminate the Netherlands. The team failed to qualify for the 2002 World Cup after crucial losses to Portugal and the Republic of Ireland, prompting manager Louis van Gaal to resign.

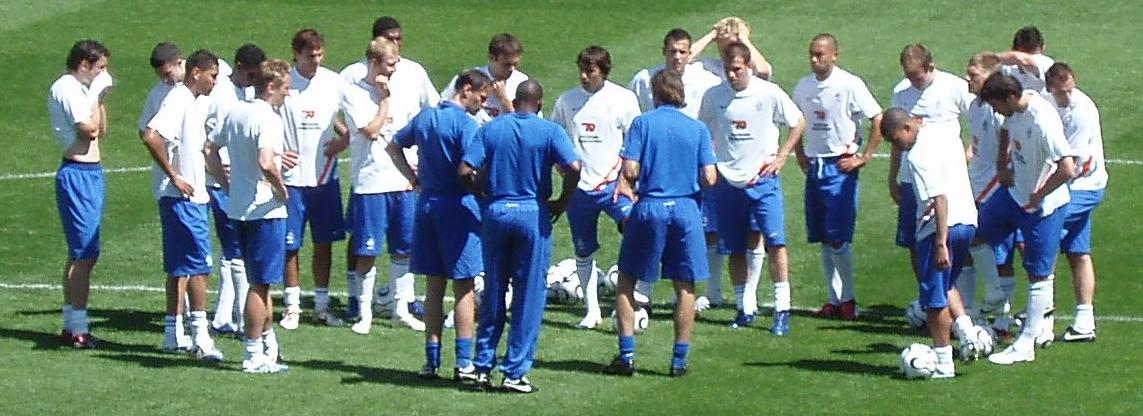
Netherlands at the 2006 World Cup

Dick Advocaat became the national coach of the Netherlands for the second time in January 2002. They qualified for UEFA Euro 2004 after beating Scotland in emphatic fashion in the play-offs. The tournament saw the Netherlands reach the semi-finals where they lost to hosts Portugal. Advocaat resigned following criticism of his leadership in July 2004.

The Netherlands qualified for the 2006 World Cup under new manager Marco van Basten. They were eliminated in the second round after losing 1–0 to Portugal. The match produced 16 yellow cards, matching the World Cup record for most cautions in one game set in 2002, and set a new World Cup record of four red cards, two per side; it was nicknamed "the Battle of Nuremberg" by the press. Despite criticism surrounding his selection decisions and the lack of attacking football from his team, Van Basten was offered a two-year extension to his contract by the KNVB. This allowed him to serve as national coach during Euro 2008 and the 2010 World Cup. The Netherlands qualified for Euro 2008, where they were drawn in the "Group of Death", together with France, Italy and Romania. They began with a 3–0 win over world champions Italy in Bern, their first victory over the Italians since 1978. They then beat France by 4–1 to qualify for the second round, and went on winning the group on nine points after beating Romania 2–0. However, they then lost in the quarter-finals to Guus Hiddink's Russia 3–1, with Ruud van Nistelrooy scoring an 86th-minute equaliser to force extra time, where the Russians scored twice through Andrey Arshavin. Following the tournament, Van Basten resigned having accepted the role at Ajax.

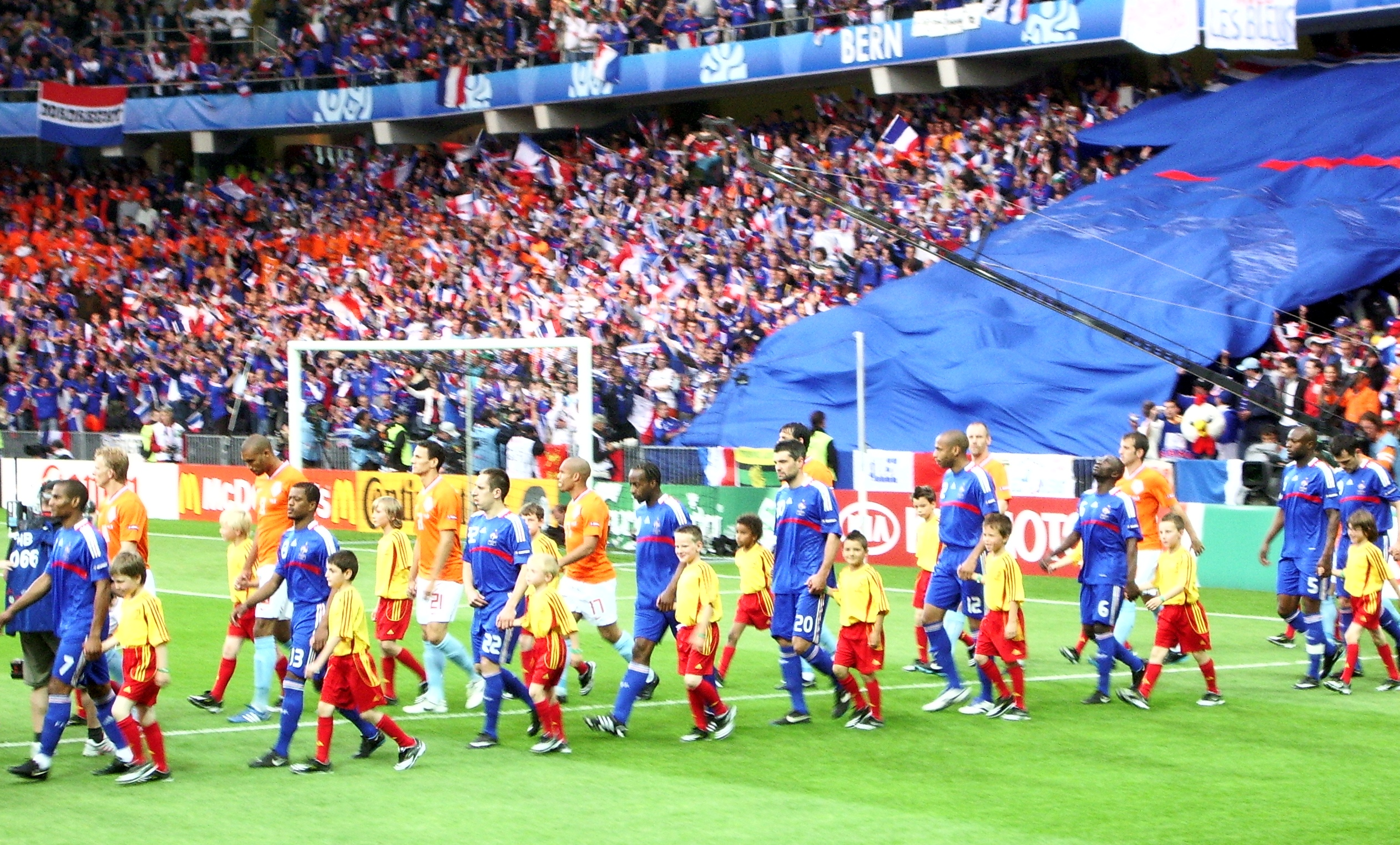
Netherlands – France at Euro 2008

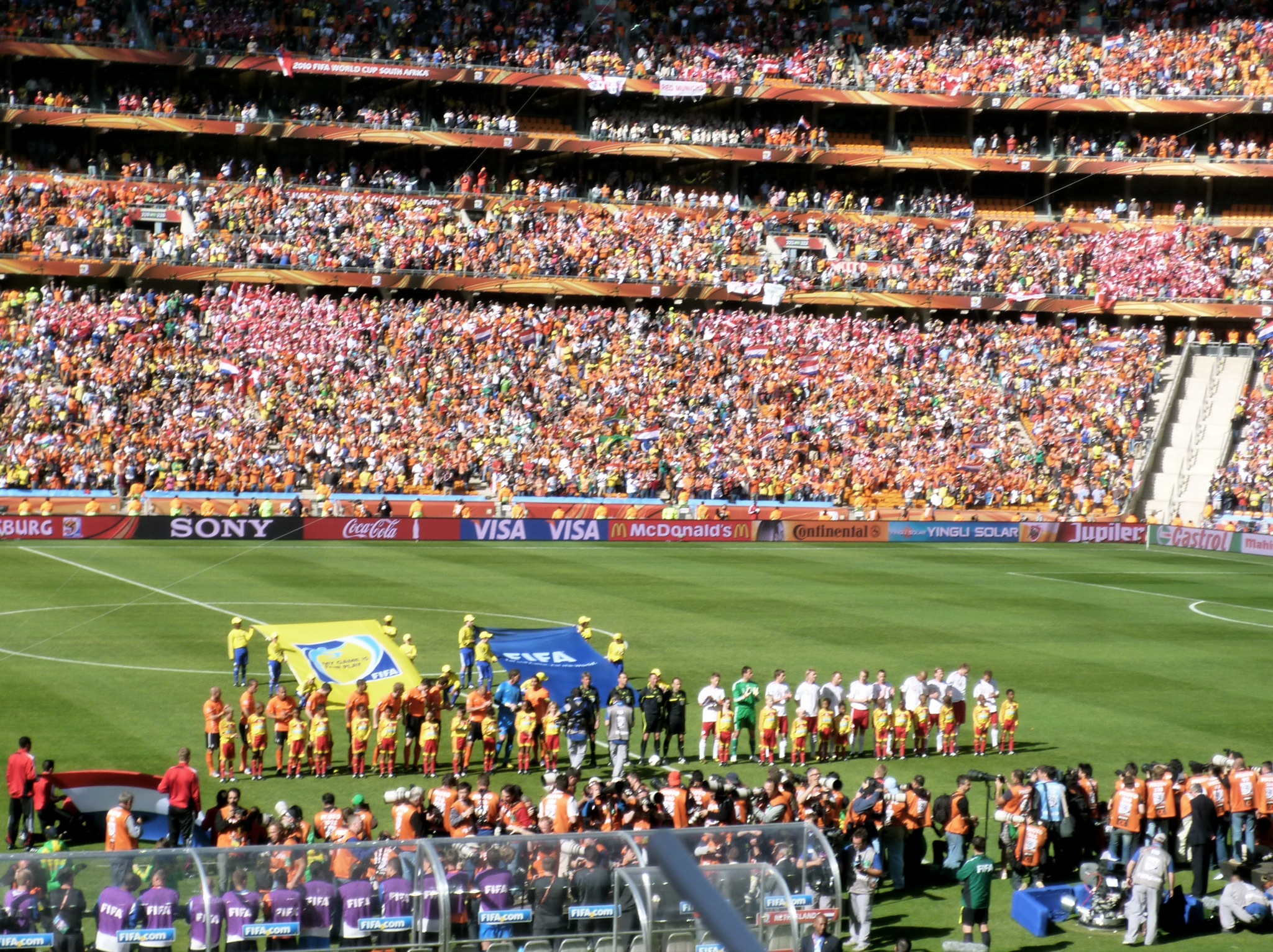
Netherlands – Denmark at the 2010 World Cup

Under new coach Bert van Marwijk, the Netherlands went on to secure a 100% record in their World Cup 2010 qualification campaign, winning all their eight games to qualify for the World Cup. After they had comfortably qualified with maximum points in Group E and Slovakia in the round of 16, they took on Brazil in the quarter-finals. After trailing 1–0 at half-time, Wesley Sneijder scored two goals in the second half to advance the team to the semi-finals where they beat Uruguay 3–2. They advanced to their first World Cup final since 1978 but fell to Spain 1–0 after midfielder Andrés Iniesta scored in extra time. From August to September 2011, the team was ranked number one in the FIFA World Ranking, becoming the second national football team, after Spain, to top the ranking without previously winning a World Cup.

For Euro 2012, the Netherlands were placed in Group B with Germany, Portugal and Denmark, dubbed the tournament "Group of Death". The Netherlands lost all three of their group matches in a tournament for the first time in their history. Manager Bert van Marwijk resigned after the disappointment.

Louis van Gaal became the manager for the second time. In the 2014 World Cup UEFA qualifying round, the Netherlands won nine games and drew one, topping the group and earning automatic qualification. They were drawn into Group B, alongside Spain, Chile and Australia. The team avenged their 2010 defeat by defeating title holders Spain 5–1 in their opening match.

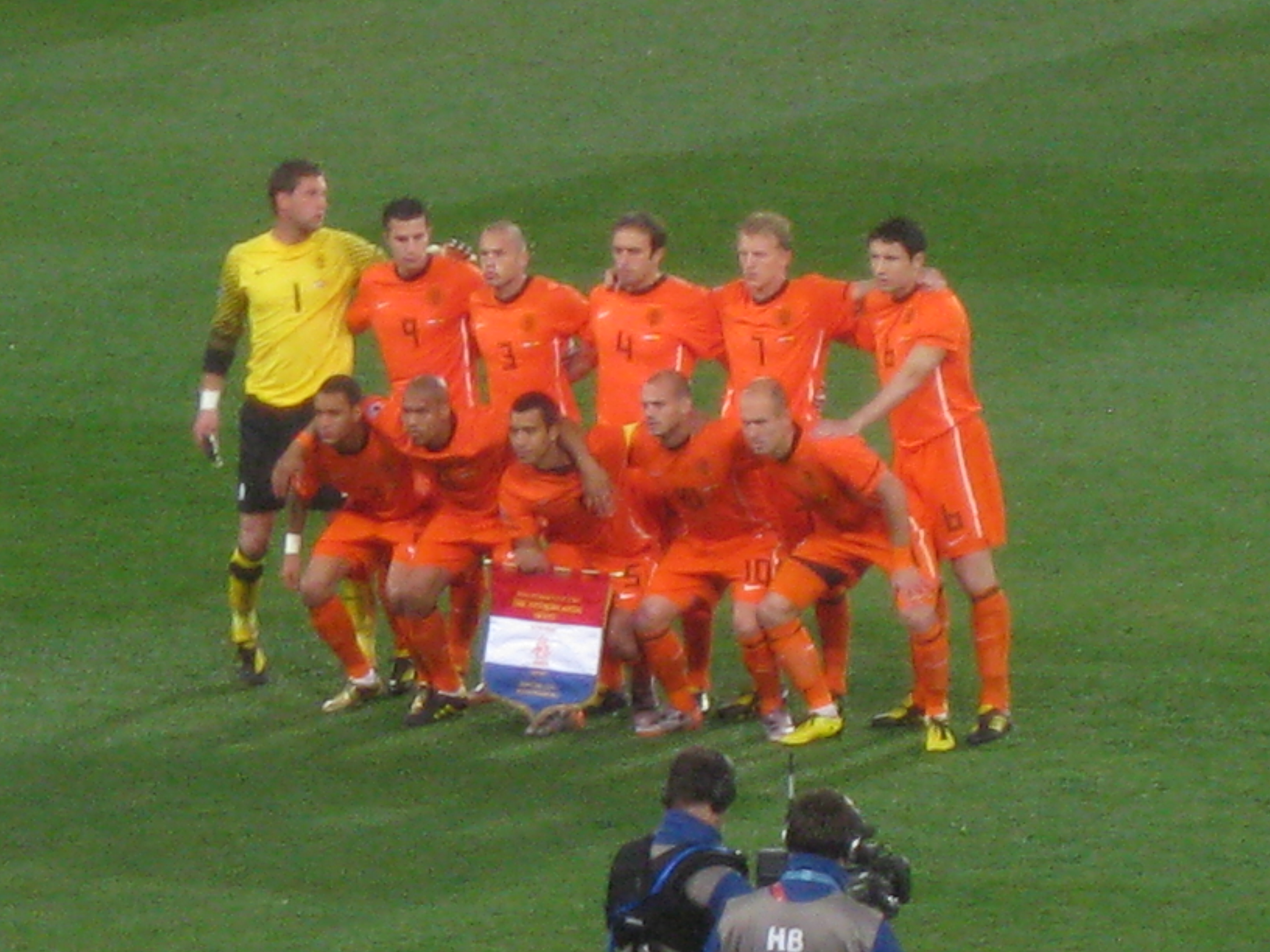
The national football team of the Netherlands before the 2010 FIFA World Cup final

After finishing top of Group B, the Netherlands defeated Mexico 2–1 in the round of 16, with Wesley Sneijder equalising late in the match and Klaas-Jan Huntelaar scoring a penalty. In the quarter-finals, where they faced Costa Rica. After a 0–0 draw, the Netherlands won the ensuing penalty shootout 4–3. Backup goalkeeper Tim Krul was brought on just before the end of extra time and made two saves in the shootout.

In the semi-final against Argentina, the Netherlands were eliminated 4–2 on penalties. The Netherlands won the third place match against hosts Brazil. Van Gaal, who successfully motivated the team after their semi-final elimination, received praise for getting more out of the young and inexperienced Netherlands squad than many expected.

=== Decline and recovery: 2014–present ===
Guus Hiddink followed Van Gaal as manager for the Euro 2016 qualifying campaign. On 29 June 2015, Hiddink resigned and was succeeded by his assistant Danny Blind. The Netherlands finished fourth in their group, failing to qualify for the European Championship for the first time since 1984, and missing a major tournament for the first time since 2002. The team's poor form continued into the 2018 World Cup qualifiers, eventually resulting in Blind being dismissed after a 2–0 defeat to Bulgaria in March 2017. After the return of Dick Advocaat as coach, the Netherlands failed to qualify for the 2018 World Cup, finishing third in Group A behind France and Sweden.

In February 2018, Advocaat was replaced by Ronald Koeman, on a contract until the summer of 2022. The Netherlands qualified for League A in the UEFA Nations League which they would win to qualify for the final four after drawing with Germany on the last match day, beating France on the head-to-head record. The Netherlands beat England in the semi-finals of the Nations League, but lost 1–0 in the final against Portugal.

The Netherlands qualified for UEFA Euro 2020, however following the qualification, Ronald Koeman resigned from the team to coach Barcelona, eventually to be succeeded by Frank de Boer. With the coronavirus pandemic postponing Euro 2020 to 2021, the Netherlands played their group matches at home at the Johan Cruyff Arena in Amsterdam, beating Ukraine 3–2, Austria 2–0 and North Macedonia 3–0. However, the tournament ended in disappointment for the Netherlands once more, as they were beaten 2–0 by the Czech Republic in their round of 16 tie in Budapest. Two days later, De Boer left his position. He was replaced by Louis van Gaal, who came out of retirement to return for a third spell in charge of the side. On 16 November 2021, the Netherlands qualified for the 2022 World Cup after beating Norway 2–0 and topping their qualification group on the final day. In the 2022 World Cup, the Netherlands topped their group with 7 points. They progressed to the quarter-finals where they lost to eventual champions Argentina on penalties. The tournament was a farewell to manager Louis Van Gaal. He had come out of retirement, despite suffering from prostate cancer and promising his wife he was done with football. According to Dutch media, Van Gaal hid his health struggles from the Dutch team in the build up to the World Cup, even attending training with a catheter in.

At Euro 2024, the Netherlands qualified from the group stage as one of the best third place teams after a win against Poland, a draw with France and a defeat to Austria. In the round of 16, the Netherlands won 3–0 against Romania. In the quarter-final, they faced Turkey who initially took the lead before Stefan de Vrij equalised for the Netherlands. The comeback was completed with an own goal by Mert Müldür. In the semi-final, they were eliminated by England after a late goal.

At the 2026 World Cup, the Netherlands topped their group with 7 points before being knocked out in the round of 32 on penalties by Morocco, the country's earliest World Cup exit. In the wake of their exit from the tournament, Ronald Koeman announced his resignation as manager one day after the loss. In August, the Netherlands hired Xavi as their new head coach, signing him to a four-year contract. He thus became the first foreign coach of the Netherlands since 1978.

== Team image ==
=== Kits and crest ===
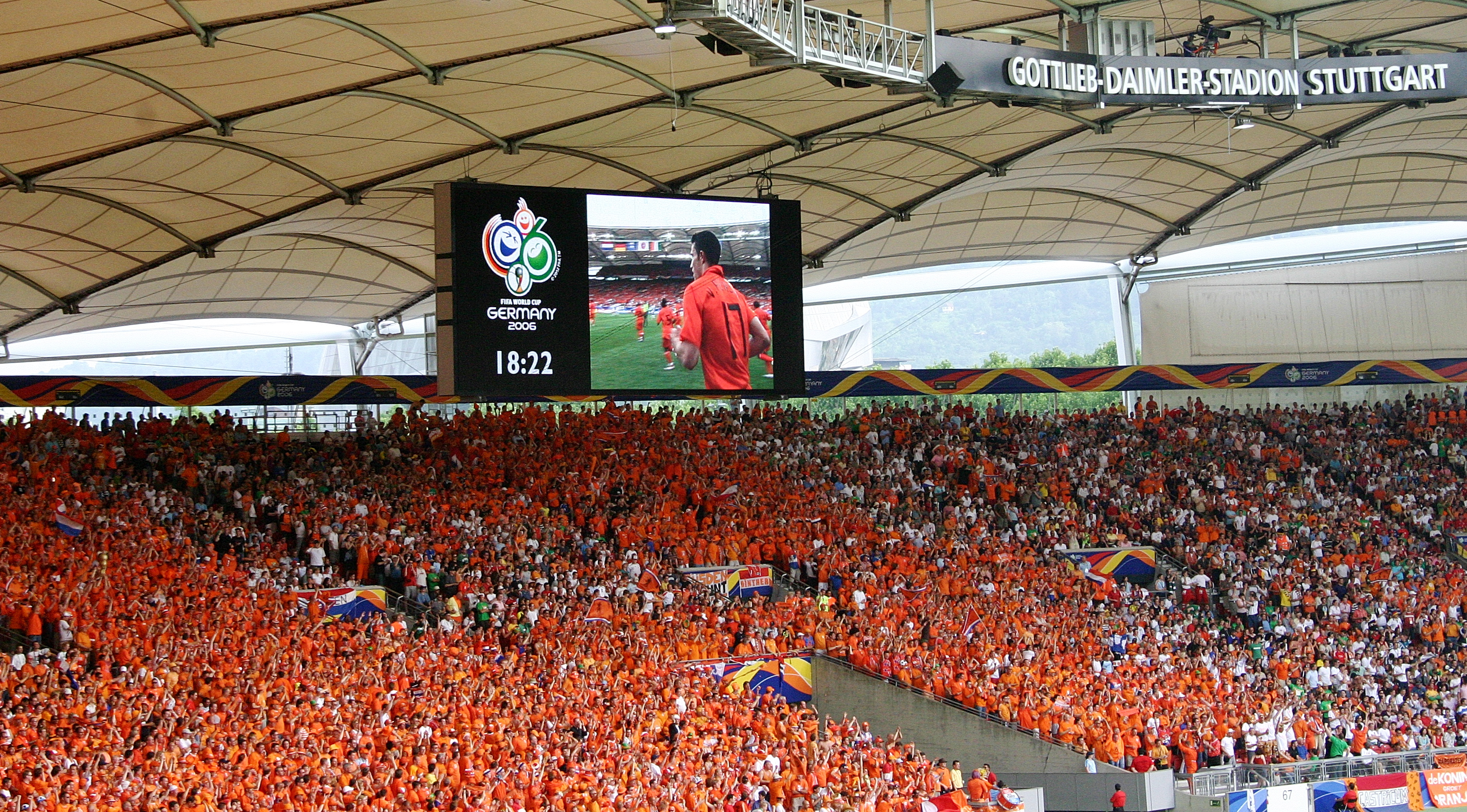
Dutch fans wearing the traditional orange colours at a 2006 World Cup match in Stuttgart

The Netherlands national football team famously plays in bright orange shirts. Orange is the historic national colour of the Netherlands, originating from one of the many titles of the ruling head of state, Prince of Orange. The current Netherlands away shirt is blue. The lion on the crest is the Netherlands' national and royal animal and has been on the crest since 1907 when they won 3–1 over Belgium. It is different from the women's team logo, which sports a lioness.

Nike is the national team's kit provider, a sponsorship that began in 1996 and is contracted to continue until at least 2026. Before that the team was supplied by Adidas and Lotto.

=== Kit suppliers ===
Kit supplier	Period	Notes
(Netherlands) Tweka	1934–1966	
(England) Umbro	1966–1969	
(Netherlands) Jansen & Tilanus	1969–1974	
(Germany) Adidas	1974–1990	
(Italy) Lotto	1991–1996	
(United States) Nike	1996–present	

=== Rivalries ===
Deeply rooted in anti-German sentiment due to the occupation of the Netherlands by Germany during World War II, the Netherlands' long-time football rival is Germany. Beginning in 1974, when the Netherlands lost the 1974 World Cup to West Germany in the final, the rivalry between the two nations has become one of the best-known in international football.

To a lesser extent, the Netherlands maintains a rivalry with their other neighbour, Belgium; a Belgium–Netherlands fixture is referred to as a Low Countries derby. They have played in 129 matches as of September 2022 with the two competing against each other regularly between 1905 and 1964. This has diminished due to the rise of semi-professional football.

In recent years, the Netherlands has also developed a intercontinental rivalry with Argentina. Recently known from the 2022 World Cup quarter-final match in Qatar, the match became known as the Battle of Lusail.

Another rivalry that has been developing in recent times is against Spain. Although not seen as intense by both sides in the past, matches like the 2010 FIFA World Cup, 2014 FIFA World Cup, and Nations League have helped make this rivalry grow.

=== Fandom ===
Since the 2004 UEFA European championship, the Dutch Orange Bus has been a part of the fan experience, leading fan marches and tailgate parties.

=== Media coverage ===
The Netherlands are broadcast on Nederlandse Omroep Stichting which includes all friendlies, Nations League matches and World Cup qualifiers. The newest contract is a seven-year deal until 2027.

== Home stadium ==
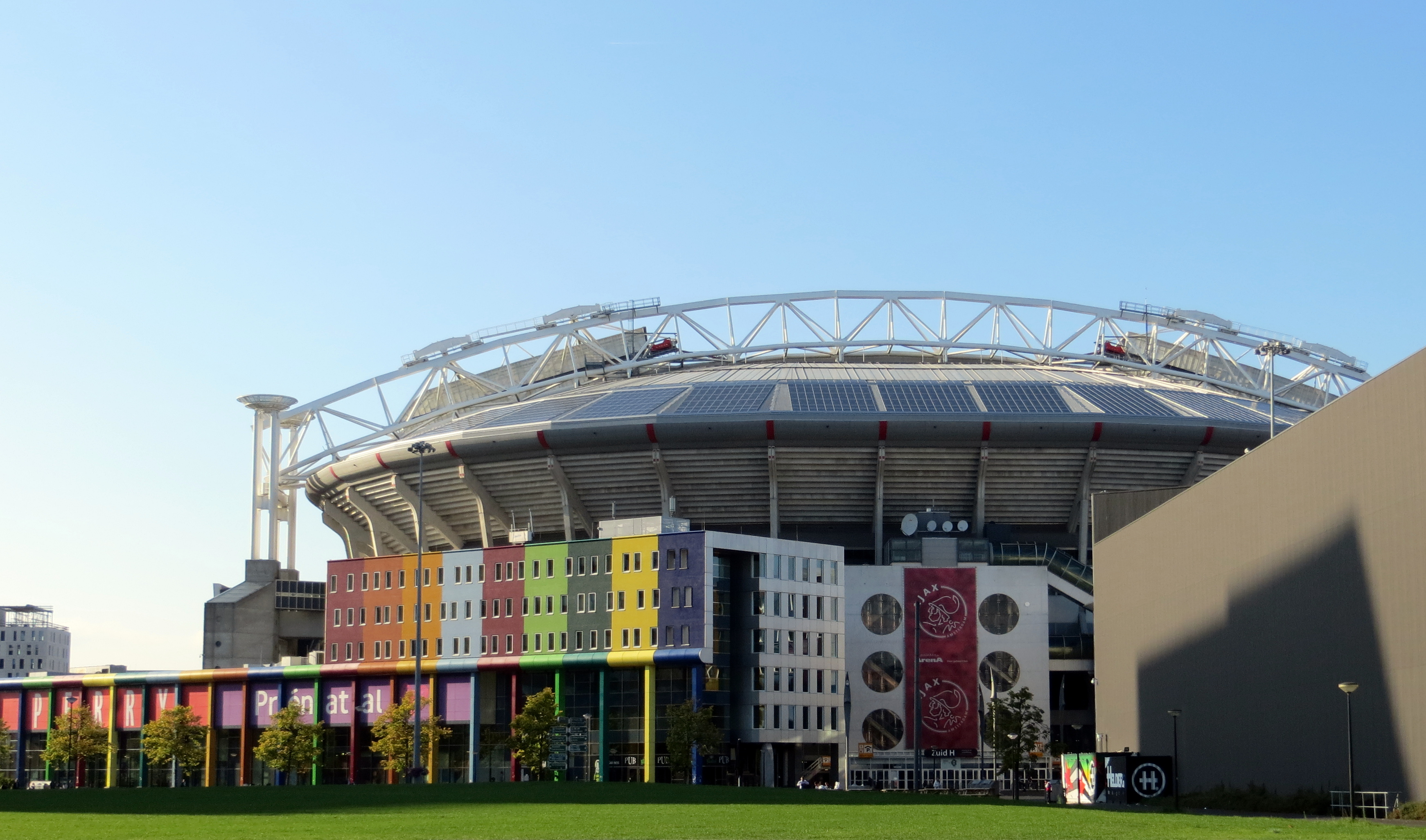
The Netherlands play most of their matches at Johan Cruyff Arena

The Netherlands national team does not have a national stadium but plays mostly at the Johan Cruyff Arena in Amsterdam. It played host to its first competitive Netherlands international match back in 1997, a 1998 World Cup qualification match against San Marino which the Netherlands won 4–0, after hosting a friendly match between The Netherlands and Brazil in 1996, which ended in a 2-2 draw. The stadium was formally called the Amsterdam Arena until 2018 when it was renamed in memory of Johan Cruyff.

Over the last few years, De Kuip in Rotterdam has hosted matches regularly and historically very often. Occasionally, matches take place at Philips Stadion in Eindhoven and also sometimes at the De Grolsch Veste in Enschede.

== Results and fixtures ==
The following is a list of match results in the last 12 months, as well as any future matches that have been scheduled.

Win Draw Loss Fixture

=== 2026 ===
27 March 2026 Friendly	Netherlands	2–1	Norway	Amsterdam, Netherlands
20:45 CET (UTC+1)	Van Dijk 35'; Reijnders 51'	Report	Schjelderup 24'	Stadium: Johan Cruyff Arena; Attendance: 50,327; Referee: Lawrence Visser (Belgium)

31 March 2026 Friendly	Netherlands	1–1	Ecuador	Eindhoven, Netherlands
20:45 CEST (UTC+2)	Pacho 3' (o.g.)	Report	Valencia 24' (pen.)	Stadium: Philips Stadion; Attendance: 29,344; Referee: Sascha Stegemann (Germany)

3 June 2026 Friendly	Netherlands	0–1	Algeria	Rotterdam, Netherlands
20:45 CEST (UTC+2)		Report	Hadj Moussa 86'	Stadium: De Kuip; Attendance: 40,306; Referee: Jakob Semler (Austria)

8 June 2026 Friendly	Netherlands	2–1	Uzbekistan	New York, United States (BCD)
14:45 EDT (UTC-4)	Gakpo 32' (pen.), 90+8' (pen.)	Report	Sergeev 90+2'	Stadium: Icahn Stadium; Attendance: 0 Referee: Alyssa Pennington (United States)

14 June 2026 2026 World Cup Group F	Netherlands	2–2	Japan	Arlington, Texas, United States
15:00 EST (UTC-5)	Van Dijk 51'; Summerville 64'	Report	Nakamura 57'; Kamada 88'	Stadium: AT&T Stadium; Attendance: 69,285; Referee: Ismail Elfath (United States)

20 June 2026 2026 World Cup Group F	Netherlands	5–1	Sweden	Houston, Texas, United States
12:00 EST (UTC-5)	Brobbey 5', 17'; Gakpo 47', 54'; Summerville 89'	Report	Elanga 59'	Stadium: NRG Stadium; Attendance: 68,777; Referee: Michael Oliver (England)

25 June 2026 2026 World Cup Group F	Tunisia	1–3	Netherlands	Kansas City, Missouri, United States
18:00 EST (UTC-5)	Mastouri 54'	Report	Skhiri 3' (o.g.); Brobbey 7'; Van Hecke 62'	Stadium: Arrowhead Stadium; Attendance: 68,391; Referee: Katia Itzel García (Mexico)

29 June 2026 2026 World Cup Round of 32	Netherlands	1–1 (a.e.t.) (2–3 p)	Morocco	Guadalupe, Nuevo León, México
19:00 CST (UTC-6)	Gakpo 72'	Report	Diop 90+1'	Stadium: Estadio BBVA; Attendance: 51,243; Referee: Wilton Sampaio (Brazil)
	Penalties
	Koopmeiners (penalty scored); Kluivert (penalty missed); Weghorst (penalty scored); Timber (penalty missed); Summerville (penalty missed)		(penalty missed) El Aynaoui; (penalty scored) Rahimi; (penalty scored) Talbi; (penalty missed) Hakimi; (penalty scored) Saibari

24 September 2026 2026–27 UEFA Nations League	Netherlands	1–1	Germany	Amsterdam, Netherlands
20:45 CEST (UTC+02:00)	Gakpo 90+2'	Report	Nmecha 32'	Stadium: Johan Cruyff Arena; Attendance: 51,437; Referee: Alejandro Hernández Hernández (Spain)

27 September 2026 2026–27 UEFA Nations League	Serbia	1–2	Netherlands	Belgrade, Serbia
18:00 CEST (UTC+02:00)	Jović 46'	Report	Meerdink 30' (pen.), 69'	Stadium: Rajko Mitić Stadium; Attendance: 15,212; Referee: Szymon Marciniak (Poland)

1 October 2026 2026–27 UEFA Nations League	Greece	2–2	Netherlands	Thessaloniki, Greece
21:45 EEST (UTC+03:00)	Ioannidis 23'; Masouras 45+2'	Report	Van Dijk 59'; Reijnders 89'	Stadium: Toumba Stadium; Attendance: 26,538; Referee: Marco Guida (Italy)

4 October 2026 2026–27 UEFA Nations League	Netherlands	2–1	Serbia	Eindhoven, Netherlands
20:45 CEST (UTC+02:00)	Koopmeiners 31'; Zirkzee 71'	Report	Cvetković 35'	Stadium: Philips Stadion; Attendance: 31,387; Referee: Donatas Rumšas (Lithuania)

13 November 2026 2026–27 UEFA Nations League	Netherlands	7–0	Greece	Amsterdam, Netherlands
20:45 CET (UTC+01:00)	Summerville 6'; Reijnders 12', 18', 33'; Timber 40', 59'; Malen 62'	Report		Stadium: Johan Cruyff Arena; Attendance: 51,221; Referee: Rohit Saggi (Norway)

16 November 2026 2026–27 UEFA Nations League	Germany	5–0	Netherlands	Berlin, Germany
20:45 CET (UTC+01:00)	Scherhant 41'; Wirtz 60', 71'; Schlotterbeck 65'; Gruda 77'	Report		Stadium: Olympiastadion; Attendance: 74,667; Referee: Glenn Nyberg (Sweden)

== Coaching staff ==
Current head coach Xavi

Position	Name
Head coach	(Spain) Xavi
Assistant coaches	(Spain) Óscar Hernández (Spain) Sergio Alegre (Netherlands) Ruud van Nistelrooy (Morocco) Adil Ramzi
Goalkeeping coach	(Netherlands) Patrick Lodewijks
Fitness coach	(Spain) Iván Torres
Team manager	(Netherlands) Cor Asp
Sports Scientist	(Netherlands) David van Maurik
Physiotherapist(s)	(Netherlands) Ricardo de Sanders (Netherlands) Gert-Jan Goudswaard (Netherlands) Luc van Agt
Doctor(s)	(Netherlands) Edwin Goedhart (Netherlands) Rien Heijboer
Masseurs	(Netherlands) Rob Koster
Analyst(s)	(Netherlands) Cees Lok (Netherlands) Gert Aandewiel (Netherlands) Dennis Demmers

== Players ==
=== Current squad ===
The following players were called up for the 2026–27 UEFA Nations League matches against Greece and Germany on 13 and 16 November 2026. On November 9, Virgil van Dijk and Brian Brobbey withdrew from the squad citing fitness issues. Van Dijk was replaced by Sepp van den Berg.
Caps and goals correct as of 16 November 2026, after the match against Germany.

No.	Pos.	Player	Date of birth (age)	Caps	Goals	Club
1	GK	Bart Verbruggen	18 August 2002 (age 24)	39	0	(The Football Association) Brighton & Hove Albion
13	GK	Robin Roefs	17 January 2003 (age 23)	1	0	(The Football Association) Sunderland
23	GK	Mark Flekken	13 June 1993 (age 33)	12	0	(German Football Association) Bayer Leverkusen
2	DF	Lutsharel Geertruida	18 July 2000 (age 26)	21	0	(Royal Dutch Football Association) PSV
3	DF	Ian Maatsen	10 March 2002 (age 24)	3	1	(The Football Association) Aston Villa
4	DF	Sepp van den Berg	20 December 2001 (age 24)	0	0	(The Football Association) Brentford
6	DF	Jan Paul van Hecke	8 June 2000 (age 26)	20	1	(The Football Association) Tottenham Hotspur
12	DF	Jurriën Timber	17 June 2001 (age 25)	28	2	(The Football Association) Arsenal
15	DF	Micky van de Ven	19 April 2001 (age 25)	30	1	(The Football Association) Tottenham Hotspur
22	DF	Denzel Dumfries	18 April 1996 (age 30)	82	11	(Royal Spanish Football Federation) Real Madrid
5	MF	Quinten Timber	17 June 2001 (age 25)	18	1	(The Football Association) Crystal Palace
7	MF	Justin Kluivert	5 May 1999 (age 27)	15	0	(The Football Association) Bournemouth
8	MF	Joey Veerman	19 November 1998 (age 28)	22	1	(German Football Association) Borussia Dortmund
14	MF	Tijjani Reijnders	29 July 1998 (age 28)	41	11	(Saudi Arabian Football Federation) Al-Qadsiah
16	MF	Guus Til	22 December 1997 (age 28)	11	1	(Royal Dutch Football Association) PSV
20	MF	Teun Koopmeiners	28 February 1998 (age 28)	35	4	(Italian Football Federation) Juventus
21	MF	Gjivai Zechiël	1 July 2004 (age 22)	3	0	(Royal Dutch Football Association) Feyenoord
9	FW	Mexx Meerdink	24 July 2003 (age 23)	5	2	(Royal Dutch Football Association) AZ
10	FW	Crysencio Summerville	30 October 2001 (age 25)	12	3	(Saudi Arabian Football Federation) Al-Hilal
11	FW	Cody Gakpo	7 May 1999 (age 27)	58	25	(The Football Association) Liverpool
17	FW	Noa Lang	17 June 1999 (age 27)	20	3	(Italian Football Federation) Napoli
18	FW	Donyell Malen	19 January 1999 (age 27)	58	14	(Italian Football Federation) Roma
19	FW	Ruben van Bommel	3 August 2004 (age 22)	6	0	(Royal Dutch Football Association) PSV

=== Recent call-ups ===
The following players have also been called up for the team in the last twelve months.

Pos.	Player	Date of birth (age)	Caps	Goals	Club	Latest call-up
GK	Justin Bijlow	22 January 1998 (age 28)	8	0	(Italy) Genoa	v. Ecuador, 31 March 2026
DF	Virgil van Dijk (captain)	8 July 1991 (age 35)	100	14	(England) Liverpool	v. Greece, 13 October 2026 ^{FIT}
DF	Nathan Aké	18 February 1995 (age 31)	62	5	(Turkey) Fenerbahçe	v. Serbia, 4 October 2026
DF	Jeremie Frimpong	10 December 2000 (age 25)	15	1	(England) Liverpool	v. Serbia, 4 October 2026
DF	Jorrel Hato	7 March 2006 (age 20)	10	0	(England) Chelsea	v. Serbia, 4 October 2026
DF	Mats Wieffer	16 November 1999 (age 27)	15	1	(England) Brighton & Hove Albion	v. 2026 FIFA World Cup
DF	Stefan de Vrij	5 February 1992 (age 34)	79	4	(Greece) Panathinaikos	v. Ecuador, 31 March 2026
MF	Frenkie de Jong	12 May 1997 (age 29)	71	2	(Spain) Barcelona	v. Germany, 16 October 2026 ^{INJ}
MF	Ryan Gravenberch	16 May 2002 (age 24)	35	1	(England) Liverpool	v. Serbia, 4 October 2026
MF	Kenneth Taylor	16 May 2002 (age 24)	6	0	(Italy) Lazio	v. Serbia, 4 October 2026
MF	Marten de Roon	29 March 1991 (age 35)	44	1	(Italy) Roma	v. 2026 FIFA World Cup
MF	Xavi Simons	21 April 2003 (age 23)	34	6	(England) Tottenham Hotspur	v. Ecuador, 31 March 2026
MF	Jerdy Schouten	12 January 1997 (age 29)	17	0	(Netherlands) PSV	v. Ecuador, 31 March 2026
MF	Luciano Valente	4 October 2003 (age 23)	2	0	(Netherlands) Feyenoord	v. Ecuador, 31 March 2026
MF	Kees Smit	20 January 2006 (age 20)	1	0	(Netherlands) AZ	v. Ecuador, 31 March 2026
FW	Brian Brobbey	1 February 2002 (age 24)	17	4	(England) Sunderland	v. Greece, 13 October 2026 ^{FIT}
FW	Joshua Zirkzee	22 May 2001 (age 25)	8	2	(England) Manchester United	v. Serbia, 4 October 2026
FW	Memphis Depay	13 February 1994 (age 32)	112	55	(Brazil) Corinthians	v. 2026 FIFA World Cup
FW	Wout Weghorst	7 August 1992 (age 34)	53	14	(Netherlands) Twente	v. 2026 FIFA World Cup
^{INJ} Player withdrew from the squad due to an injury.^{FIT} Player withdrew from the squad due to fitness concerns.^{PRE} Preliminary squad.^{RET} Player had announced retirement from national team.^{SUS} Player is serving a suspension.^{PRI} Player absent due to private circumstances.

== Individual statistics ==
=== Player records ===
As of 29 June 2026.
Players in bold are still active with the Netherlands.

=== Most appearances ===
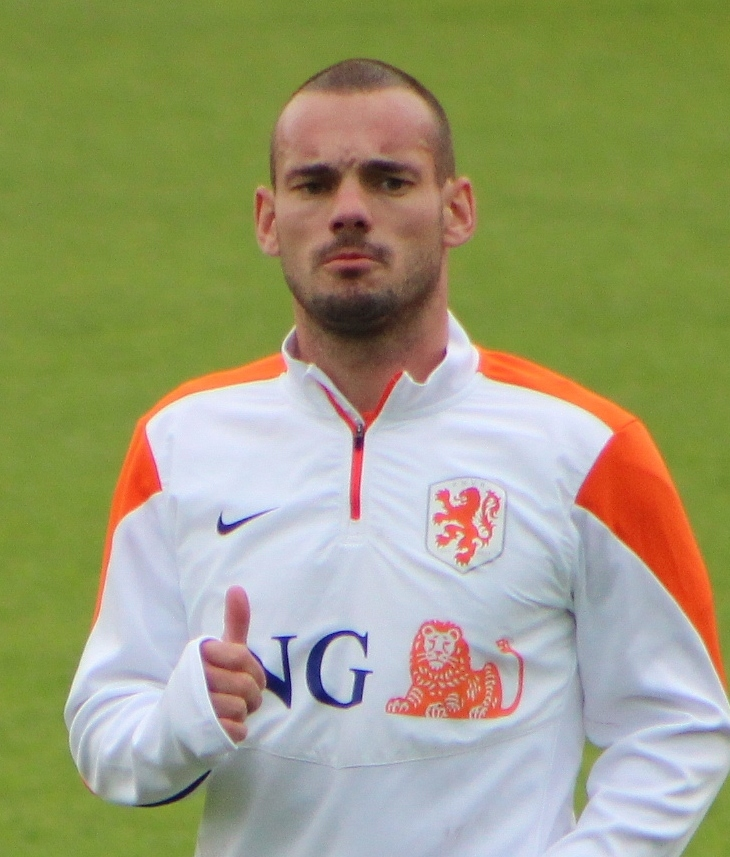
Wesley Sneijder is the Netherlands' most capped player, with 134 appearances.

Rank	Player	Matches	Goals	Career
1	Wesley Sneijder	134	31	2003–2018
2	Edwin van der Sar	130	0	1995–2008
3	**Memphis Depay**	112	55	2013–present
3	Frank de Boer	112	13	1990–2004
5	Rafael van der Vaart	109	25	2001–2013
6	Daley Blind	108	3	2013–2024
7	Giovanni van Bronckhorst	106	6	1996–2010
8	Dirk Kuyt	104	24	2004–2014
9	Robin van Persie	102	50	2005–2017
10	Phillip Cocu	101	10	1996–2006

=== Top goalscorers ===
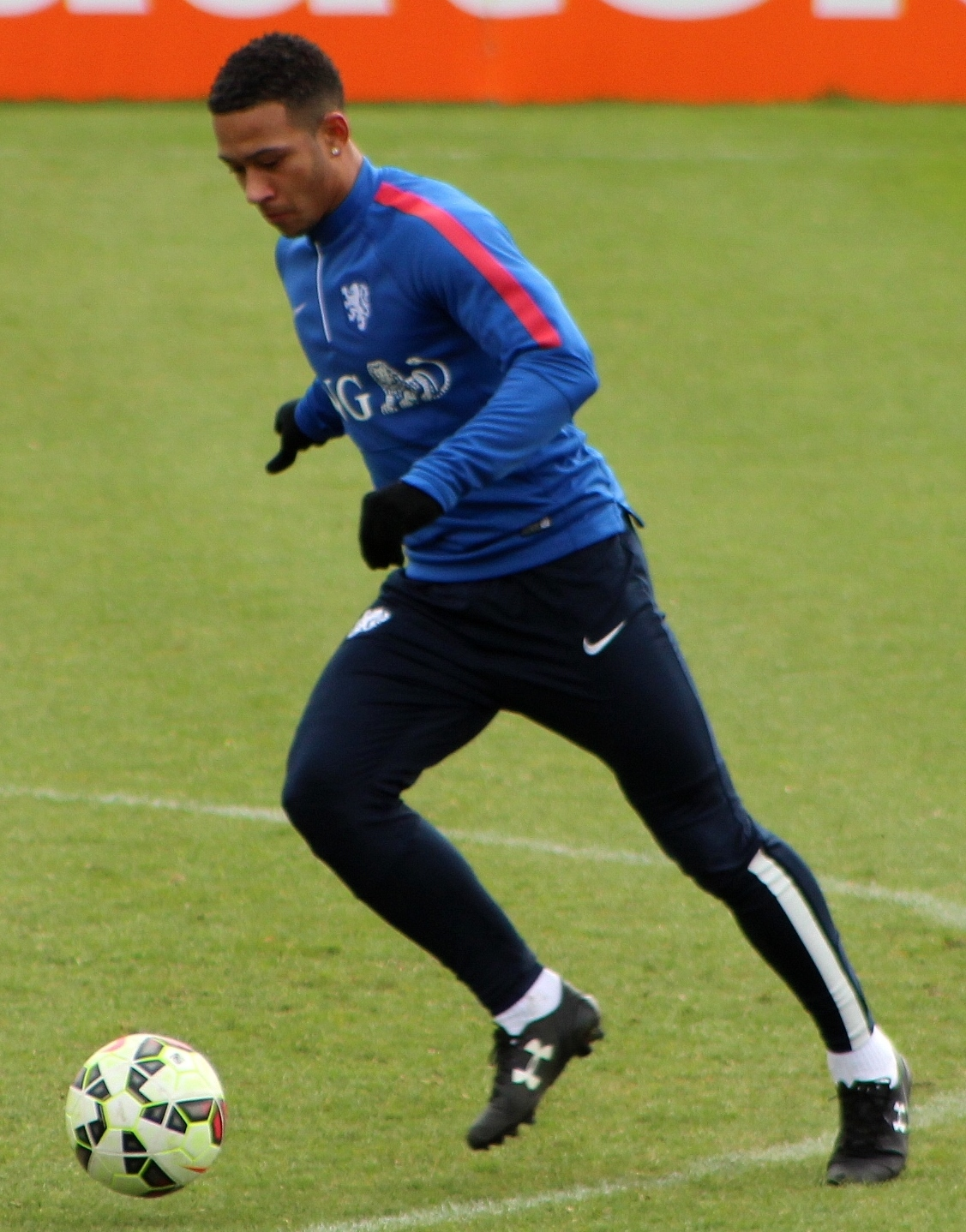
Memphis Depay is the Netherlands' top scorer, with 55 goals.

Rank	Player	Goals	Matches	Ratio	Career
1	**Memphis Depay**	55	112	0.49	2013–present
2	Robin van Persie	50	102	0.49	2005–2017
3	Klaas-Jan Huntelaar	42	76	0.55	2006–2015
4	Patrick Kluivert	40	79	0.51	1994–2004
5	Dennis Bergkamp	37	79	0.47	1990–2000
5	Arjen Robben	37	96	0.39	2003–2017
7	Faas Wilkes	35	38	0.92	1946–1961
7	Ruud van Nistelrooy	35	70	0.5	1998–2011
9	Abe Lenstra	33	47	0.7	1940–1959
9	Johan Cruyff	33	48	0.69	1966–1977

=== Manager records ===
- Most wins: Louis van Gaal, 40 wins
- Longest reign: Bob Glendenning, 15 years
- Most tenures: Rinus Michels, 4 tenures

== Team records ==
- Biggest win:
  - Netherlands 11–0 San Marino (Eindhoven, Netherlands; 2 September 2011)
- Biggest defeat:
  - England Amateurs 12–2 Netherlands (Darlington, England; 21 December 1907)

== Competitive record ==
=== FIFA World Cup ===
The Netherlands' first two tournament appearances at the 1934 and the 1938 editions saw them lose their first round matches to Switzerland (1934) and Czechoslovakia (1938).

After not entering the 1950 and 1954 tournaments before failing to qualify for the next four World Cups, they qualified for the 1974 FIFA World Cup in West Germany. They lost 2–1 in the final, with Gerd Müller scoring the winning goal for the Germans, that year's hosts. The Netherlands once again made the 1978 FIFA World Cup final with the team finishing second in the group behind Peru. After finishing top of the all-European group in the second round, they met Argentina in the final. Argentina protested René van de Kerkhof's forearm plaster cast. After that protest, the game went to extra time where Argentina won 3–1 after scoring two goals in extra time.

The 1990 edition saw the Netherlands not win a single game throughout the tournament, scoring only two goals in the group stage. 1994 saw the Netherlands knocked out in the quarter-final stage as they lost to eventual champions Brazil with Branco's brutal free-kick sending them out. After qualifying from their group with five points, the Netherlands made the semi-finals of the 1998 edition where they once again lost to the Brazilians, this time via a penalty shootout. Both Phillip Cocu's and Ronald de Boer's shots missed the goal to give Brazil a spot in the final. This was taken very hard by the Netherlands. The Netherlands went on to finish in fourth place after losing to Croatia in the third place playoff.

In 2006, the Netherlands made it to the round of 16 where, in what was called the "Battle of Nuremberg" they lost by a single goal to Portugal. The Netherlands were given seven yellow cards. The following edition, in 2010, saw the team qualify to the knockout stage by finishing atop Group E. After defeating Slovakia 2–1 in the round of 16, they came back from an early goal by Robinho to defeat Brazil 2–1 in the quarter-finals as Wesley Sneijder scored a double. In the semi-finals, they defeated Uruguay in a tough game for the Netherlands, making their first World Cup final since 1978. The Netherlands faced Spain in the final, the latter appearing in their first World Cup final. However, the Dutch were once again defeated in the final with Spain winning 1-0 in extra-time.

In 2014, the Netherlands finished atop Group B with wins over Spain, Australia and Chile. The Netherlands took bronze in the tournament after defeating host nation Brazil 3–0 in the third place playoff.

With the Netherlands having failed to qualify for the 2018 World Cup, falling behind France and Sweden in the qualifying group stage, they qualified for the 2022 World Cup. They defeated Senegal in the group stage, followed by a draw against Ecuador, and a win over hosts Qatar. In the Round of 16 the Netherlands defeated the United States 3-1, only to lose to eventual champions Argentina in the Quarter Finals in a penalty shootout after 2-2.

Champions Runners-up Third place Hosts

FIFA World Cup record										Qualification record					
Year	Round	Position	Pld	W	D	L	GF	GA	Squad	Pld	W	D	L	GF	GA
(Uruguay) 1930	Did not enter									Did not enter					
(Italy) 1934	Round of 16	9th	1	0	0	1	2	3	Squad	2	2	0	0	9	4
(France) 1938	Round of 16	14th	1	0	0	1	0	3	Squad	2	1	1	0	5	1
(Brazil) 1950	Did not enter									Did not enter					
(Switzerland) 1954	Did not enter									Did not enter					
(Sweden) 1958	Did not qualify									4	2	1	1	12	7
(Chile) 1962	Did not qualify									3	0	2	1	4	7
(England) 1966	Did not qualify									6	2	2	2	6	4
(Mexico) 1970	Did not qualify									6	3	1	2	9	5
(West Germany) 1974	Runners-up	2nd	7	5	1	1	15	3	Squad	6	4	2	0	24	2
(Argentina) 1978	Runners-up	2nd	7	3	2	2	15	10	Squad	6	5	1	0	11	3
(Spain) 1982	Did not qualify									8	4	1	3	11	7
(Mexico) 1986	Did not qualify									8	4	1	3	13	7
(Italy) 1990	Round of 16	15th	4	0	3	1	3	4	Squad	6	4	2	0	8	2
(United States) 1994	Quarter-finals	7th	5	3	0	2	8	6	Squad	10	6	3	1	29	9
(France) 1998	Fourth place	4th	7	3	3	1	13	7	Squad	8	6	1	1	26	4
(South Korea) (Japan) 2002	Did not qualify									10	6	2	2	30	9
(Germany) 2006	Round of 16	11th	4	2	1	1	3	2	Squad	12	10	2	0	27	3
(South Africa) 2010	Runners-up	2nd	7	6	0	1	12	6	Squad	8	8	0	0	17	2
(Brazil) 2014	Third place	3rd	7	5	2	0	15	4	Squad	10	9	1	0	34	5
(Russia) 2018	Did not qualify									10	6	1	3	21	12
(Qatar) 2022	Quarter-finals	5th	5	3	2	0	10	4	Squad	10	7	2	1	33	8
(Canada) (Mexico) (United States) 2026	Round of 32	17th	4	2	2	0	11	5	Squad	8	6	2	0	27	4
(Morocco) (Portugal) (Spain) 2030	To be determined									To be determined					
(Saudi Arabia) 2034	To be determined									To be determined					
Total	Runners-up	12/23	58	32	16	11	109	57	—	143	95	28	20	356	105

Netherlands' World Cup history
First Match	Switzerland 3–2 Netherlands (27 May 1934; Milan, Italy)
Biggest Win	Netherlands 5–0 South Korea (20 June 1998; Marseille, France)
Biggest Defeat	Czechoslovakia 3–0 Netherlands (5 June 1938; Le Havre, France)
Best Result	Runners-up in 1974, 1978, 2010
Worst Result	Round of 32 in 2026

=== UEFA European Championship ===
UEFA European Championship record										Qualification record					
Year	Round	Position	Pld	W	D	L	GF	GA	Squad	Pld	W	D	L	GF	GA
(France) 1960	Did not enter									Did not enter					
(Spain) 1964	Did not qualify									4	1	2	1	6	5
(Italy) 1968	Did not qualify									6	2	1	3	11	11
(Belgium) 1972	Did not qualify									6	3	1	2	18	6
(Socialist Federal Republic of Yugoslavia) 1976	Third place	3rd	2	1	0	1	4	5	Squad	8	6	0	2	21	9
(Italy) 1980	Group stage	5th	3	1	1	1	4	4	Squad	8	6	1	1	20	6
(France) 1984	Did not qualify									8	6	1	1	22	6
(West Germany) 1988	Champions	1st	5	4	0	1	8	3	Squad	8	6	2	0	15	1
(Sweden) 1992	Semi-finals	4th	4	2	2	0	6	3	Squad	8	6	1	1	17	2
(England) 1996	Quarter-finals	8th	4	1	2	1	3	4	Squad	11	7	2	2	25	5
(Belgium) (Netherlands) 2000	Semi-finals	4th	5	4	1	0	13	3	Squad	Qualified as co-hosts					
(Portugal) 2004	Semi-finals	4th	5	1	2	2	7	6	Squad	10	7	1	2	26	7
(Austria) (Switzerland) 2008	Quarter-finals	6th	4	3	0	1	10	4	Squad	12	8	2	2	15	5
(Poland) (Ukraine) 2012	Group stage	15th	3	0	0	3	2	5	Squad	10	9	0	1	37	8
(France) 2016	Did not qualify									10	4	1	5	17	14
(Europe) 2020	Round of 16	9th	4	3	0	1	8	4	Squad	8	6	1	1	24	7
(Germany) 2024	Semi-finals	4th	6	3	1	2	10	7	Squad	8	6	0	2	17	7
(United Kingdom) (Republic of Ireland) 2028	To be determined									To be determined					
(Italy) (Turkey) 2032	To be determined									To be determined					
Total	1 Title	11/17	45	23	9	13	75	48	—	125	83	16	26	291	99

=== Olympic Games ===
Olympic Games record
Year	Round	Pld	W	D	L	GF	GA	Squad
(United Kingdom) 1908	Third place	2	1	0	1	2	4	Squad
(Sweden) 1912	Third place	4	3	0	1	17	8	Squad
(Belgium) 1920	Third place	4	2	0	2	9	10	Squad
(France) 1924	Fourth place	5	2	1	2	11	7	Squad
(Netherlands) 1928	Round of 16	1	0	0	1	0	2	Squad
(Nazi Germany) 1936	Did not enter							
(United Kingdom) 1948	Round of 16	2	1	0	1	6	5	Squad
(Finland) 1952	Round of 16	1	0	0	1	1	5	Squad
(Australia) 1956	Did not enter							
(Italy) 1960	Did not enter							
(Japan) 1964	Did not enter							
(Mexico) 1968	Did not enter							
(West Germany) 1972	Did not enter							
(Canada) 1976	Did not enter							
(Soviet Union) 1980	Did not enter							
(United States) 1984	Did not qualify							
(South Korea) 1988	Did not qualify							
Since 1992	See Netherlands national under-21 football team							
Total	8/17	23	9	1	9	46	41	—

Since 1992, the Olympic Games has been an under-23 tournament (with three players of over 23 years of age allowed in the squad).

=== UEFA Nations League ===
UEFA Nations League record
League phase / quarter-finals												Finals									RK
Season	LG	Grp	Pos	Pld	W	D	L	GF	GA	P/R	RK	Year	Round	Pld	W	D	L	GF	GA	Squad	RK
2018–19	A	1	1st	4	2	1	1	8	4	Same position	3rd	(Portugal) 2019	Runners-up	2	1	0	1	3	2	Squad	2nd
2020–21	A	1	2nd	6	3	2	1	7	4	Same position		(Italy) 2021	Did not qualify								
2022–23	A	4	1st	6	5	1	0	14	6	Same position	1st	(Netherlands) 2023	Fourth place	2	0	0	2	4	7	Squad	4th
2024–25	A	3	2nd	6	2	3	1	13	7	Same position	6th	(Germany) 2025	Did not qualify								
2024–25	A	Quarter-final		2	0	2	0	5	5	Same position	6th	(Germany) 2025	Did not qualify								
2026–27	A	2	2nd	6	3	2	1	14	10	Same position	7th	2027	To be determined								
2026–27	A	Quarter-final		0	0	0	0	0	0	Same position	7th	2027	To be determined								
Total				30	15	11	4	61	36	1st		Total Finals:2/4	Runners-up	4	1	0	3	7	9	—	2nd

== FIFA Ranking ==
Last update was on 21 December 2023. Source: The FIFA/Coca-Cola World Ranking - Associations - Netherlands - Men's

Worst Ranking Best Ranking Worst Mover Best Mover

Netherlands's FIFA world ranking
Rank	Year	Games played	Won	Drawn	Lost	Best		Worst	
Rank	Year	Games played	Won	Drawn	Lost	Rank	Move	Rank	Move
7	1993	7	5	1	2	2	▲5	16	▼9
6	1994	15	9	3	3	2	▲9	11	▼6
6	1995	9	5	0	4	5	▲12	17	▼9
9	1996	11	6	3	2	6	▲7	13	▼5
22	1997	7	4	1	2	4	▲4	22	▼10
11	1998	15	8	5	2	6	▲19	25	▼11
19	1999	9	0	7	2	8	▲3	19	▼3
8	2000	14	9	4	1	8	▲13	21	▼2
8	2001	10	6	3	1	7	▲2	10	▼1
6	2002	7	6	1	0	6	▲4	15	▼6
4	2003	11	6	3	2	4	▲2	7	▼3
6	2004	17	8	5	4	4	▲1	6	▼1
3	2005	11	7	3	1	2	▲2	7	▼1
7	2006	14	6	4	4	3	▲0	6	▼3
9	2007	12	7	3	2	5	▲2	9	▼3
3	2008	15	6	3	6	3	▲5	10	▼1
3	2009	11	5	3	3	2	▲1	3	▼1
2	2010	17	15	1	1	2	▲2	4	▼1
2	2011	11	6	2	2	1	▲1	2	▼1
8	2012	13	7	1	6	2	▲2	8	▼4
9	2013	12	7	5	0	5	▲4	9	▼4
5	2014	17	9	3	5	3	▲12	15	▼4
14	2015	9	4	1	4	5	▲2	16	▼7
22	2016	11	5	3	3	14	▲4	26	▼12
20	2017	11	8	0	3	20	▲9	36	▼11
14	2018	10	4	4	2	14	▲2	21	▼1
14	2019	10	7	1	2	12	▲1	16	▼2
14	2020	8	3	3	2	13	▲1	15	▼2
10	2021	16	11	3	2	10	▲1	16	▼2
6	2023	10	6	0	4	6	▲4	7	▼1

== Honours ==
=== Global ===
- FIFA World Cup
  - Runners-up: 1974, 1978, 2010
  - Third place: 2014
- Olympic Games
  - Third place: 1908, 1912, 1920

=== Continental ===
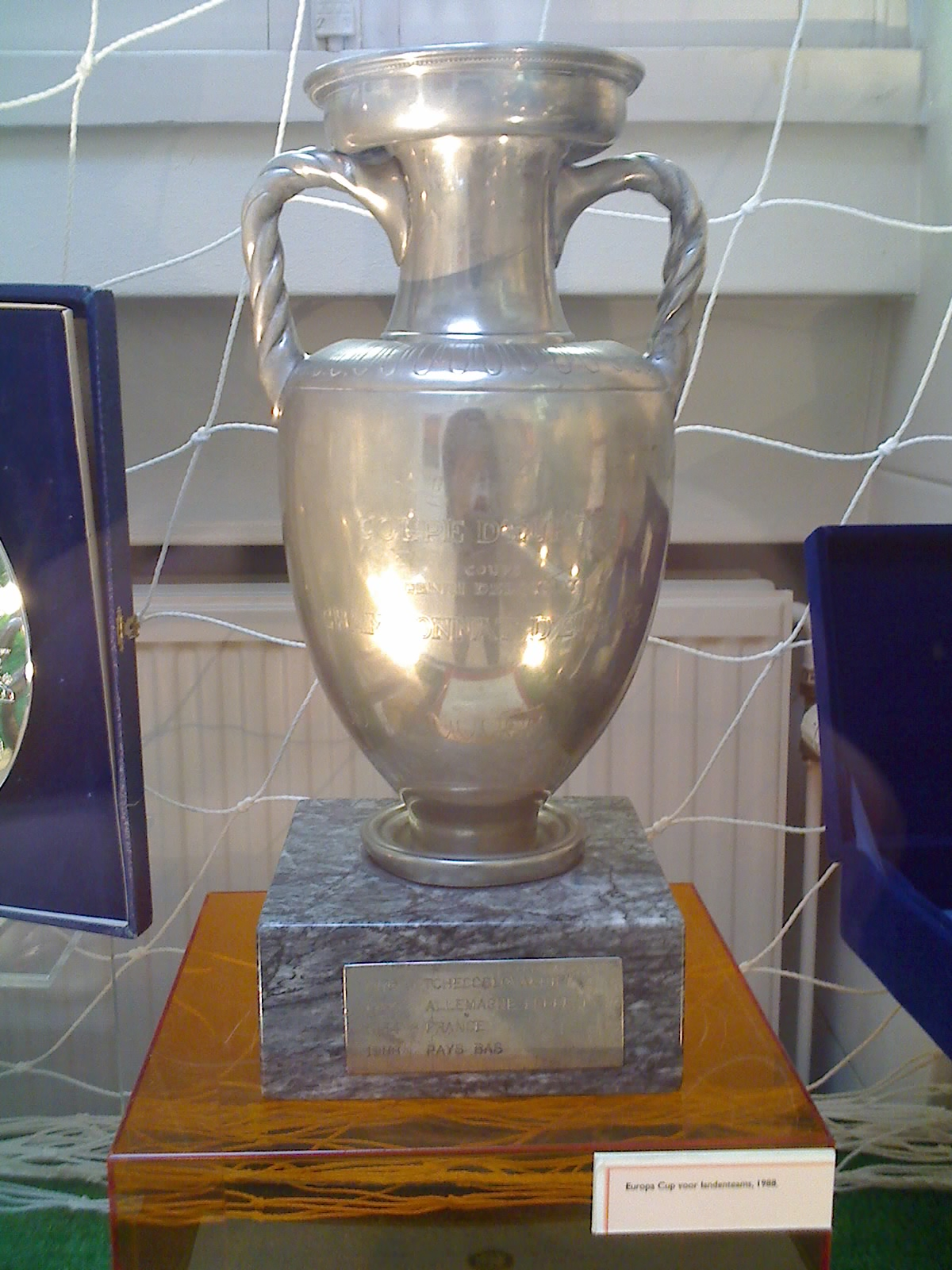
The 1988 trophy on display in Amsterdam

- UEFA European Championship
  - Champions: 1988
  - Third place: 1976
- UEFA Nations League
  - Runners-up: 2019

=== Awards ===
- World Soccer Team of the Year: 1988
- FIFA World Cup Fair Play Trophy: 2026

=== Summary ===
Competition	1st place, gold medalist(s)	2nd place, silver medalist(s)	3rd place, bronze medalist(s)	Total
FIFA World Cup	0	3	1	4
Olympic Games	0	0	3	3
UEFA European Championship	1	0	1	2
UEFA Nations League	0	1	0	1
Total	1	4	5	10

== See also ==
- Netherlands Golden Generation
- Netherlands national under-21 football team
- Netherlands national under-19 football team
- Netherlands national under-17 football team
