= Oranjegekte =

Dutch sporting phenomenon

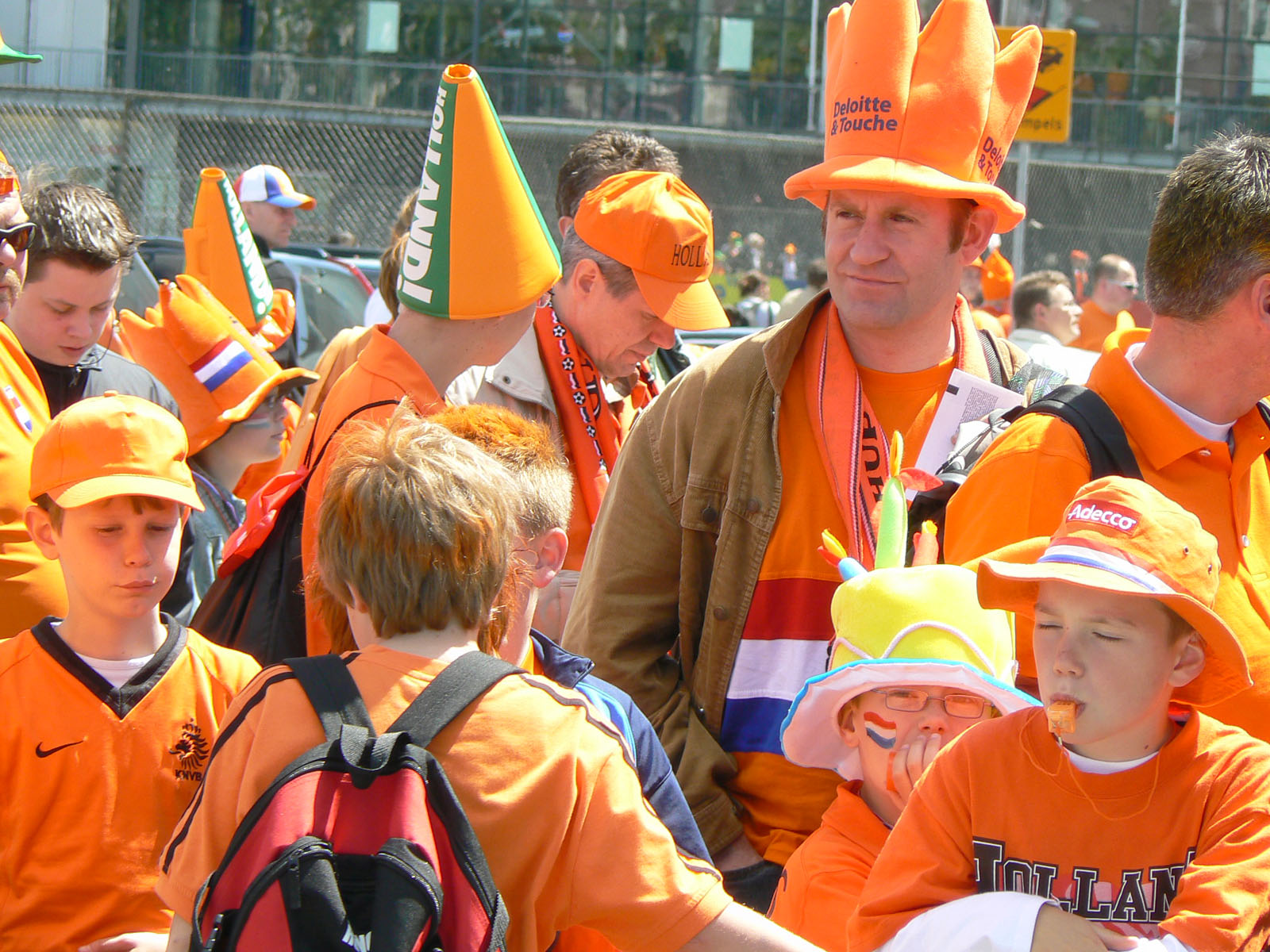
Dutch people dressed in orange before the football match Netherlands–Australia

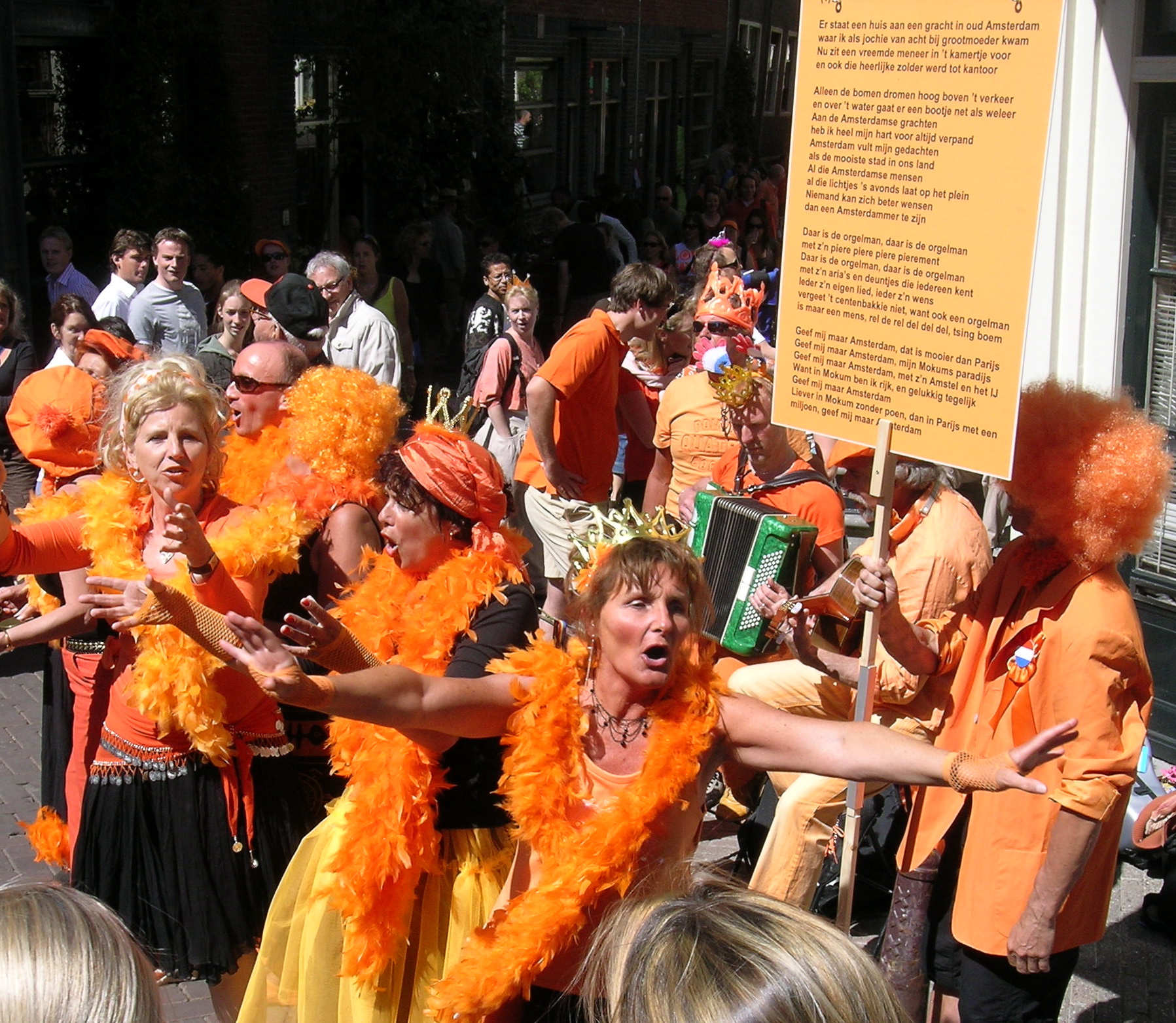
Women dressed in orange during Queen's Day in the Netherlands

Oranjegekte (Dutch: [oːˈrɑɲəˌɣɛktə]; 'orange craze') or Oranjekoorts (Dutch: [oːˈrɑɲəˌkoːrts]; 'orange fever') is a phenomenon in the Netherlands that occurs during major sporting events, especially international football championships, Formula One Grands Prix and during Koningsdag (Kingsday), an annual holiday celebrating the king's birthday. It manifests itself in the wearing of orange clothing such as T-shirts, caps and scarfs; lavish attention for sports and sports fans in the media; and the decoration of cars, rooms, houses, shops, and even entire streets in orange, the traditional colour of the Dutch royal family, the House of Orange-Nassau.

== History ==
Oranjegekte was initially confined to a few days in the year reserved for celebrations of the monarchy, until it expanded to include sports events. Festivities were usually organized at the local level by neighborhood associations and Oranjeverenigingen ("Orange associations") and supported financially by the government. Notable events include the January 1937 wedding between Juliana of the Netherlands, then the Dutch crown princess, and Bernhard of Lippe-Biesterfeld; in Emmen and other places festivities lasted until the start of World War II.

Large crowds of supporters became a phenomenon in the Dutch media when during the 1934 FIFA World Cup in Italy thousands of supporters (though not yet in orange-clad) traveled to Italy and crowded the boulevards, some dressed in the traditional garb of Volendam (according to De Telegraaf). The onset of Oranjegekte among supporters dressed up in orange (called the Oranjelegioen, 'Orange Legion') was the European Championship Speed Skating in 1966.

Oranjegekte is considered to have really taken off during the 1974 World Cup, where 30 to 40 thousand Dutch fans attended every game: "Along the way a new phenomenon revealed itself during the tournament: national oranjegekte and masses of supporters following the team." Even the 2–1 loss to West Germany in the final did not dampen Dutch enthusiasm in West Germany and at home, though the loss left a wound not healed until UEFA Euro 1988.

== Importance and meaning ==
Oranjegekte has been compared to the Scottish Tartan Army—both, it is argued, are elements of national identity formation, simultaneously personal and collective, and not rational. It is cultivated by organizations such as the Dutch Olympic Committee, which stage events to increase orange fever and drum up support for Dutch Olympians.

The phenomenon is of great importance to commerce as well. Many companies introduce special orange editions of their regular products. Commercials tend to respond well to this and especially during World Championships a lot of commercials refer to the event. Many brands and supermarket chains introduce special goodies during these events—well-known are the Heineken hats and Albert Heijn's Wuppies, Welpies and Beesies. Likewise, popular artists produce special topical songs around the time of the European and World Championships that refer to the Netherlands national football team, usually metonymized as Oranje (Orange).

== See also ==
- Tifosi
