= Koningsdag =

Dutch national holiday

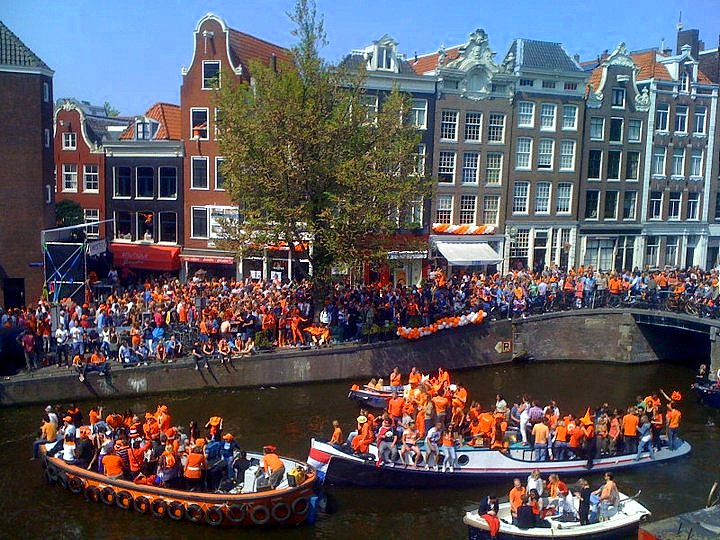
- People dressed in orange on the canals of Amsterdam in 2010
- Observed by: Kingdom of the Netherlands (Netherlands, Aruba, Curaçao, Sint Maarten)
- Type: National holiday
- Significance: Birthday of King Willem-Alexander
- Celebrations: Partying, wearing orange costumes, flea markets, concerts and traditional local gatherings
- Date: 27 April (26 April if 27 April is a Sunday)
- Frequency: Annual

Koningsdag (Dutch pronunciation: [ˈkoːnɪŋzdɑx]) or King's day is a national holiday in the Kingdom of the Netherlands. Celebrated on 27 April (or, if that is a Sunday, on the 26th), the date marks the birth of King Willem-Alexander. When the Dutch monarch is female, the holiday is known as Koninginnedag ([ˌkoːnɪŋˈɪnədɑx]) or Queensday and, under Queen Beatrix until 2013, was celebrated on 30 April. She prolonged the tradition that was born under her mother's reign: Queen Juliana's birthday was on 30 April.

The holiday was initially observed on 31 August 1885 as Prinsessedag or Princessday, the fifth birthday of Princess Wilhelmina, then heir presumptive to the Dutch throne. On her accession in November 1890 the holiday acquired the name Koninginnedag, first celebrated on 31 August 1891. In September 1948, her daughter Juliana ascended to the throne and the holiday was moved to her birthday, 30 April. The holiday was celebrated on this date from 1949.

Juliana's daughter, Beatrix, retained the celebration on 30 April upon her ascent to the throne in 1980, because her birthday was on 31 January, the middle of winter. Beatrix did alter her mother's custom of receiving a floral parade at Soestdijk Palace, instead choosing to visit different Dutch towns each year and join in the festivities with her children.

Queen Beatrix abdicated on Queensday 2013, and her son, Willem-Alexander, ascended the throne (the first king since the observance of the national holiday). As a result, the holiday became known as Koningsdag from 2014 on, and the celebration was moved to 27 April, Willem-Alexander's birthday.

Koningsdag is known for its nationwide vrijmarkt ('freemarket'), at which the Dutch sell their used items. It is also an opportunity for "orangecraze" or oranjegekte, a kind of frenzy named after the Netherlands' national colour.

== Changing of the date ==
During the reign of Queen Wilhelmina, Queen's Day was celebrated on 31 August, her birthday, until 1948. After Juliana's coronation, from 1949 onwards, the date was moved to her date of birth, 30 April. When Queen Beatrix ascended to the throne in 1980 she chose to not move this date to honor her mother. An additional practical consideration for her was that on her own birthday, 31 January, the weather was not deemed suitable enough for a large-scale outdoor event, unlike the end of April. Between 1949 and 1980, because of religious observation, if 30 April was a Sunday, Queen's Day would be moved one day later to 1 May. However, since 1980, this was turned around to instead take place a day earlier, so that the celebrations would be held on the Saturday preceding the 30th. This was the case in 1989 for the first time.

After the coronation of King Willem-Alexander, the date changed to that of his date of birth, 27 April, from 2014 onwards, if not on a Sunday. If that occurred, which was true for 2014 itself as well, King's Day will again be held on the 26th.

== History ==
=== Wilhelmina (1885–1948) ===
Koninginnedag on 31 August 1932 in Amsterdam

Faced with an unpopular monarchy, in the 1880s the liberals in Dutch government sought a means of promoting national unity. King William III was disliked, but his four-year-old daughter Princess Wilhelmina was not. A holiday honouring King William had been intermittently held on his birthday, and J. W. R. Gerlach, editor of the newspaper Utrechts Provinciaal en Stedelijk Dagblad, proposed that the princess's birthday be observed as an opportunity for patriotic celebration and national reconciliation. Prinsessedag or Princess's Day was first celebrated in the Netherlands on 31 August 1885, Wilhelmina's fifth birthday. The young princess was paraded through the streets, waving to the crowds. The first observance occurred only in Utrecht, but other municipalities quickly began to observe it, organizing activities for children. Further processions were held in the following years, and when Wilhelmina inherited the throne in 1890, Prinsessedag was renamed Koninginnedag, or Queen's Day. By then almost every Dutch town and city was marking the holiday.

The celebration proved popular, and when the Queen came of age in 1898, her inauguration was postponed six days to 6 September so as not to interfere with Koninginnedag. The annual holiday fell on the final day of school summer vacation, which made it popular among schoolchildren. It is uncertain how much Wilhelmina enjoyed the festivities; although writer Mike Peek, in a 2011 magazine article about Koninginnedag, suggests she was enthusiastic, there is a story of Wilhelmina, after a tired return from one of these birthday processions, making her doll bow until the toy's hair was dishevelled, and telling it, "Now you shall sit in a carriage and bow until your back aches, and see how much you like being a Queen!"

Koninginnedag 1902 not only honoured the Queen's birthday, but was celebrated with increased enthusiasm as it marked her recovery from serious illness. Wilhelmina rarely attended Koninginnedag festivities after reaching adulthood. She attended ceremonies for her silver jubilee in 1923, which included massive festivities in Amsterdam and The Hague, despite the Queen's request that large sums not be spent because economic conditions at the time were difficult. To ensure that even the poorer parts of the city were included, bands played simultaneously at 28 locations across The Hague. Wilhelmina made further exceptions for such events as her fiftieth birthday in 1930. During the German occupation of the Netherlands during World War II, Koninginnedag celebrations were banned, and members of the Orange Committees, which organize the holiday events, destroyed their records for fear of German reprisals.

=== Juliana (1948–1980) ===
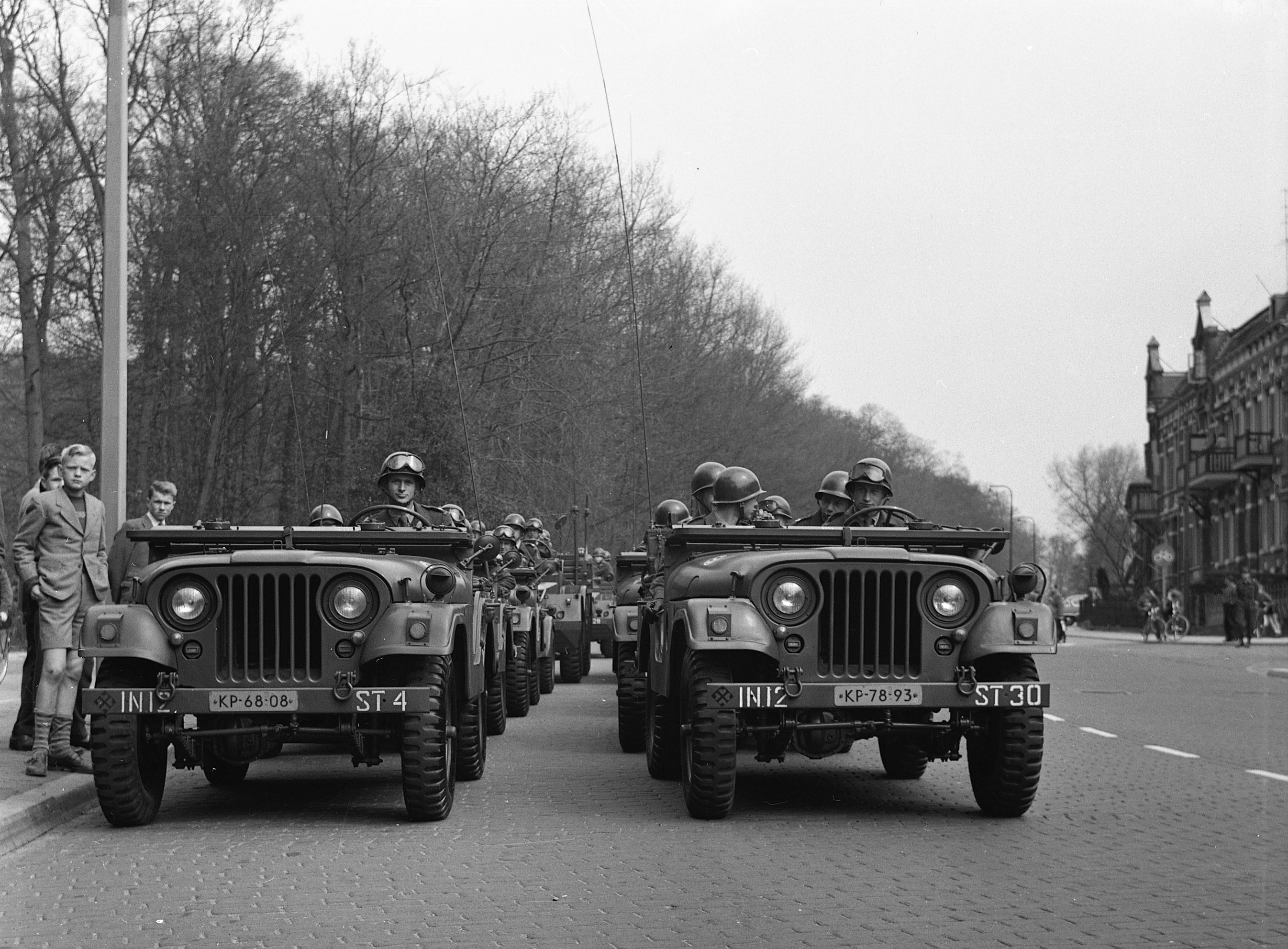
Military parade in Arnhem, Koninginnedag 1958

Another summertime birthday celebration in the Netherlands was that of Wilhelmina's mother, Queen-Regent Emma, who after Wilhelmina attained adulthood generally spent her own birthday, 2 August, at Soestdijk Palace in Baarn. Until her death in 1934, Emma received an annual floral tribute from the townsfolk on her birthday. In 1937 Wilhelmina's daughter and heiress, Princess Juliana, took up residence at Soestdijk Palace following her marriage, and the townsfolk made their floral presentation to her, moving the date to Juliana's birthday, 30 April. In September 1948 Juliana ascended to the Dutch throne and from 1949 onwards Koninginnedag was on her birthday. The change in date attracted immediate approval from Dutch children, who gained an extra day of holiday. The first observance of the holiday on the new date included a huge circus at the Amsterdam Olympic Stadium—one not attended by the royal family, who remained at Soestdijk Palace. Queen Juliana retained the floral tribute, staying each year on Koninginnedag at Soestdijk Palace to receive it. The parade became televised in the 1950s, and Koninginnedag increasingly became a national holiday, with workers given the day off. Juliana had a reputation as a "queen of the people", and according to Peek, "it felt as if she invited her subjects to the royal home".

In early 1966 Juliana's eldest daughter, Princess Beatrix, married Klaus-Georg von Amsberg. The marriage was controversial because the new Prince Claus (as he was dubbed) was a German, and Claus himself had served in the German Army during the war. Anti-German riots in Amsterdam marred the wedding day and the following observances of Koninginnedag. Fearing further demonstrations on the holiday, government officials decided to open Amsterdam city centre to the vrijmarkt ("free market") that had long been held on Koninginnedag in the outskirts of town, principally for children. The vrijmarkt occupied the space where demonstrations might have been held, and began a new custom.

=== Beatrix (1980–2013) ===
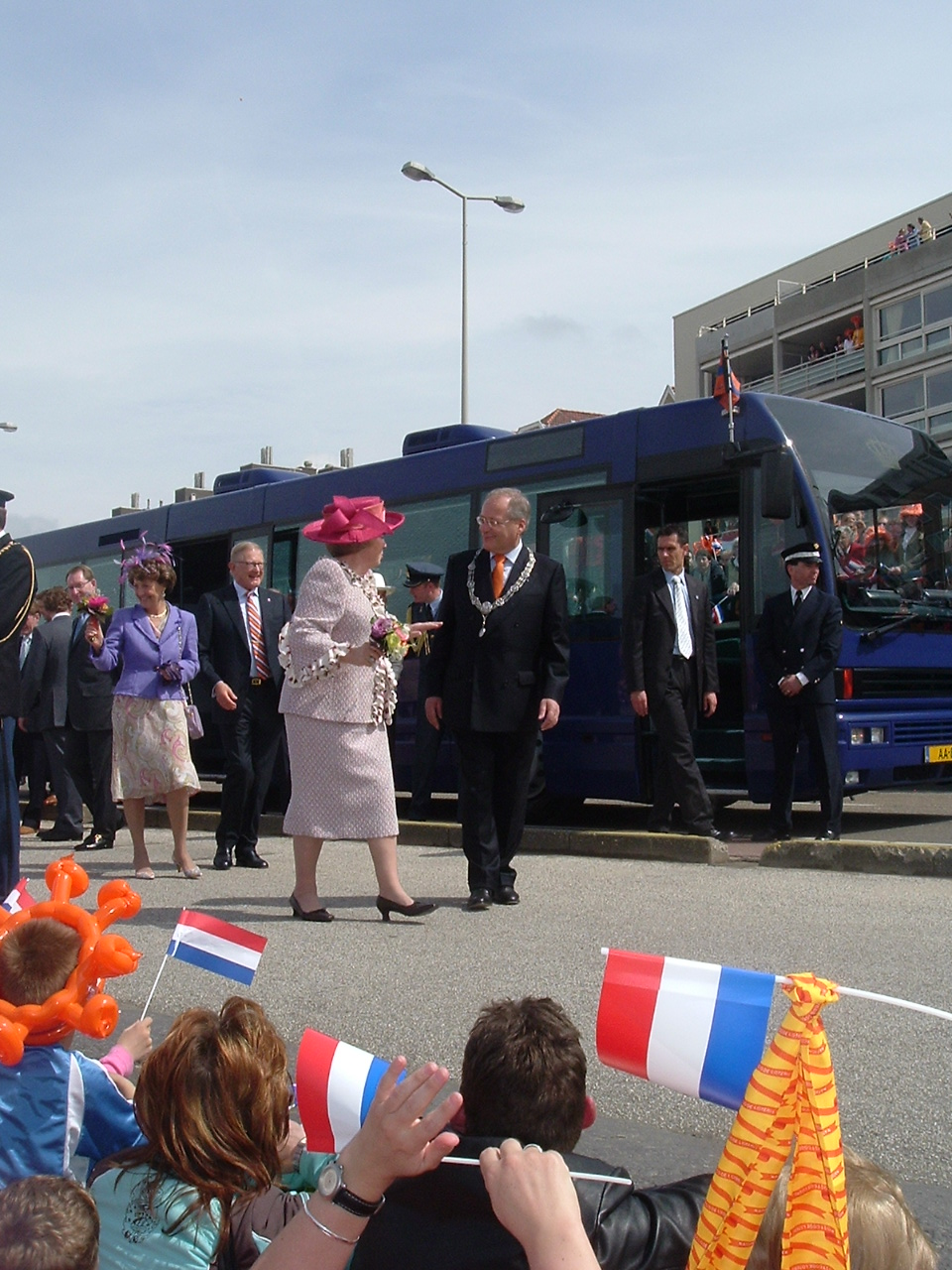
Queen Beatrix speaks with the mayor of The Hague, Wim Deetman in Scheveningen, Koninginnedag 2005.

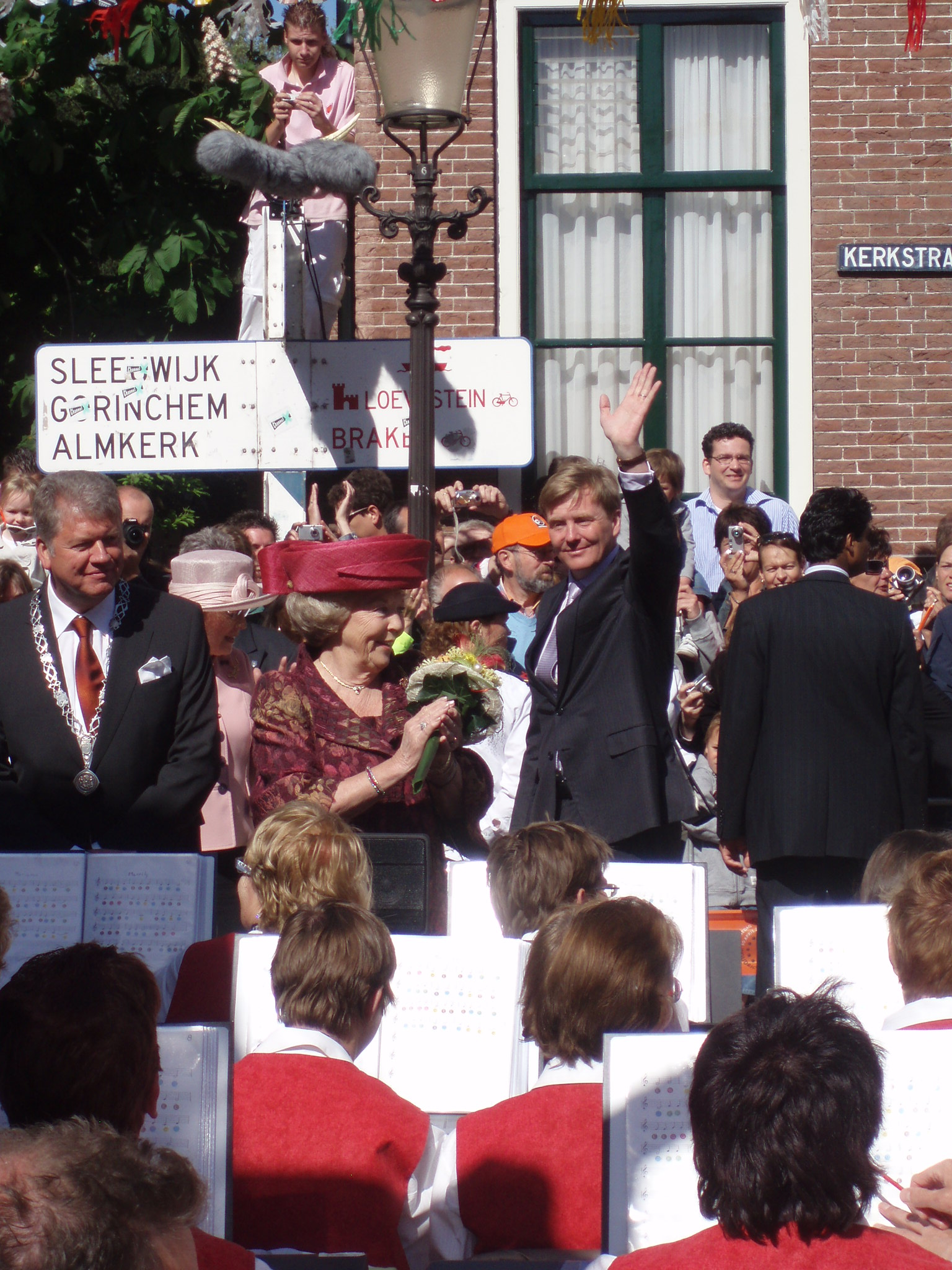
Queen Beatrix and her son and heir Willem-Alexander, Prince of Orange (waving) visit Woudrichem in 2007.

When Queen Beatrix succeeded her mother Juliana on the latter's abdication on 30 April 1980, the new queen decided to keep the holiday on 30 April as a tribute to her mother. (If 30 April fell on a Sunday, Koninginnedag was observed the previous day—this occurred most recently in 2006.) The reason was practical as well—Beatrix's actual birthday on 31 January would have been less conducive to the traditional outdoor activities. Rather than remaining at the palace and letting the Dutch people come to her, Beatrix instead usually visited two towns each year for Koninginnedag celebrations. Local crafts and customs were demonstrated for the royal family, who had the opportunity to join in.

Koninginnedag celebrations have sometimes been affected or disrupted. In 1988 three British servicemen stationed in Germany who were in the Netherlands for Koninginnedag were killed in Irish Republican Army attacks. In 1996 the celebrations in Rotterdam were dampened by an alcohol ban, put in place following riots earlier in the week after local football club Feyenoord won the Dutch league championship. The Queen's scheduled 2001 visits to Hoogeveen and Meppel were postponed for one year owing to an outbreak of foot-and-mouth disease.

On 30 April 2009, Beatrix and other members of the royal family were at the town of Apeldoorn when a 38-year-old man, Karst Tates, drove his Suzuki Swift automobile into the crowd, narrowly missing the open-top bus the royal family members were riding on. Seven people were killed and further celebrations were cancelled. Tates died of injuries sustained in the attack soon afterwards and his exact motives remain unclear, though it appears his target was the royal family. The incident provoked questions about whether the royal family should continue to participate in the celebrations. However, Beatrix indicated that the tragedy would not stop her from meeting her people. In 2010, Beatrix and her family visited Wemeldinge and Middelburg, in Zeeland province. There were no incidents, and afterwards, the Queen thanked Zeeland for giving Koninginnedag back to her family, and to her country.

All towns and cities visited by Queen Beatrix from 1981 to 2012

Queen Beatrix visited the following towns and cities over the years on Koninginnedag:

- 1981: Veere and Breda
- 1982: Harlingen and Zuidlaren
- 1983: Lochem and Vaassen
- 1984: The Hague
- 1985: Anna Paulowna, Callantsoog, and Schagen
- 1986: Deurne and Meijel
- 1987: Breukelen
- 1988: Genemuiden, Kampen, and informally Amsterdam
- 1989: Goedereede and Oud-Beijerland
- 1990: Haren and Loppersum
- 1991: Buren and Culemborg
- 1992: Rotterdam
- 1993: Vlieland and Sneek
- 1994: Emmeloord and Urk
- 1995: Eijsden and Sittard
- 1996: Sint Maartensdijk and Bergen op Zoom
- 1997: Marken and Velsen
- 1998: Doesburg and Zutphen
- 1999: Houten and Utrecht
- 2000: Katwijk and Leiden
- 2001: visits cancelled
- 2002: Hoogeveen and Meppel
- 2003: Wijhe and Deventer
- 2004: Warffum and Groningen
- 2005: Scheveningen and The Hague
- 2006: Zeewolde and Almere
- 2007: Woudrichem and 's-Hertogenbosch
- 2008: Makkum and Franeker
- 2009: Apeldoorn (2009 attack on the Dutch royal family)
- 2010: Wemeldinge and Middelburg
- 2011: Weert and Thorn
- 2012: Rhenen and Veenendaal
- 2013: visits cancelled

On 28 January 2013 Queen Beatrix announced her abdication on 30 April 2013 in favour of her son, Willem-Alexander. Since this date coincided with Koninginnedag the royal family's planned visit to De Rijp and Amstelveen was cancelled, although Koninginnedag 2013 was still celebrated throughout the country.

=== Willem-Alexander ===
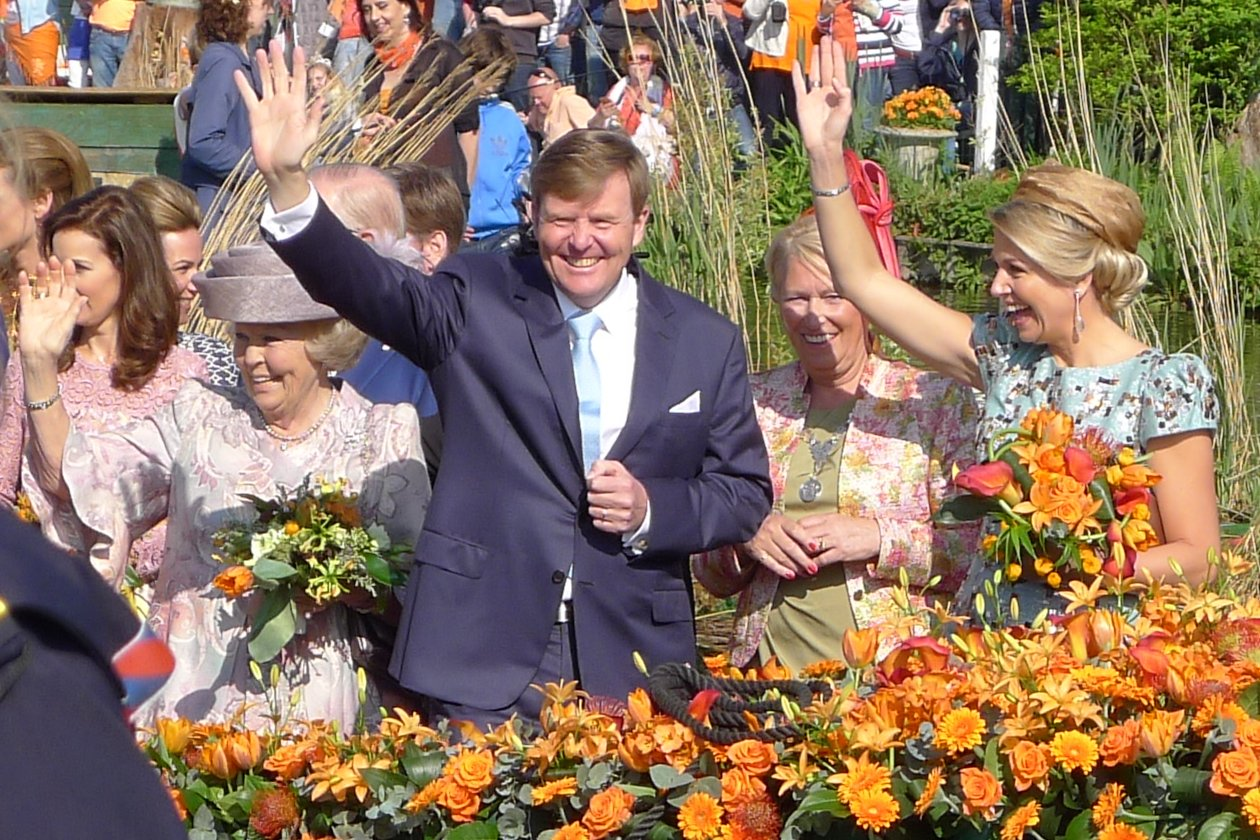
King Willem-Alexander, Queen Maxima and Princess Beatrix during the celebration of Koningsdag 2014 in De Rijp

Map of all towns and cities visited by King Willem-Alexander since 2014

On 30 April 2013, Queen's Day, Willem-Alexander succeeded his mother Beatrix and became the first King of the Netherlands in 123 years. Consequently, from 2014 onwards the name has been changed from Queen's Day to King's Day. The date has also changed from 30 to 27 April, which is the actual birthday of Willem-Alexander. On the first King's Day – held on 26 April 2014 because 27 April 2014 was a Sunday – the king visited De Rijp and Amstelveen (originally planned to be visited by Queen Beatrix in 2013, but postponed due to her abdication).

King Willem-Alexander has visited the following towns and cities over the years on Koningsdag:

- 2014: De Rijp and Amstelveen
- 2015: Dordrecht
- 2016: Zwolle
- 2017: Tilburg
- 2018: Groningen
- 2019: Amersfoort
- 2020: visit cancelled
- 2021: Eindhoven
- 2022: Maastricht
- 2023: Rotterdam
- 2024: Emmen
- 2025: Doetinchem
- 2026: Dokkum

Due to the coronavirus pandemic, many King's day celebrations were cancelled in 2020, including the royal family's planned visit to Maastricht. An alternative stay-at-home program was issued instead, featuring a simultaneous national anthem sing-along and a national toast moment. The King addressed the Dutch people from his home.

== Activities ==
The festivities on Koningsdag are often organised by Orange Committees (Dutch: Oranjecomité), local associations that seek sponsorship and donations for their activities. In recent years some committees have had difficulty in recruiting new members from among the younger Dutch.

=== Flea market ===
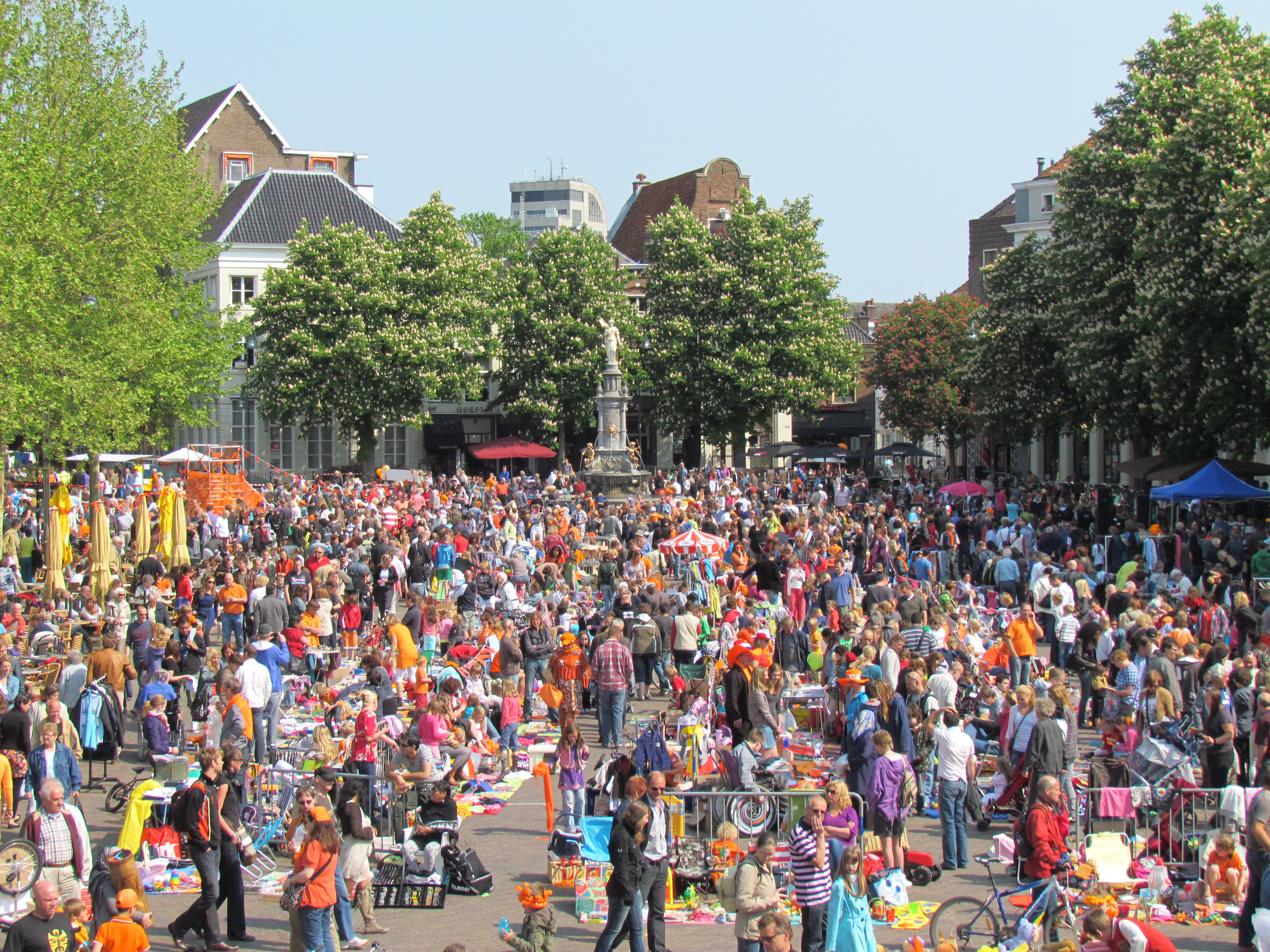
Vrijmarkt, Koninginnedag 2011, Deventer

The vrijmarkt (literally 'free market') is a nationwide flea market, at which many people sell their used goods. Koningsdag is the one day of the year that the Dutch government permits sales on the street without a permit and without the payment of value added tax. ING Bank found in 2011 that one in five Dutch residents planned to sell at the vrijmarkt and estimated they would earn €100 per person for a total turnover of €290 million. Over half of the Dutch people buy at the vrijmarkt; ING Bank predicted they would spend €28 each at the 2011 vrijmarkt. Queen Beatrix has been known to buy at the vrijmarkt; in 1995 she purchased a floor lamp. The bank also forecast that the lowest level of sales at the vrijmarkt in 2011 would be in the province of Limburg, site of Queen Beatrix's visit.

Among the most popular areas for the vrijmarkt in Amsterdam is the Jordaan quarter, but the wide Apollolaan in front of the Hilton hotel in southern Amsterdam is gaining in popularity. Children sell their cast-off toys or garments at the Vondelpark, also in southern Amsterdam, and in a spirit of fun passers-by often offer the young sellers more than they are asking for the goods. Until 1996, the vrijmarkt began the evening before and continued for 24 hours. This was ended in the hope of gaining a pause in the celebrations so preparations could be made for the daytime activities. Utrecht, uniquely among Dutch municipalities, retains the overnight vrijmarkt. In 2020, people could sell their goods on an online platform to avoid physical contact with customers.

=== Festivities ===
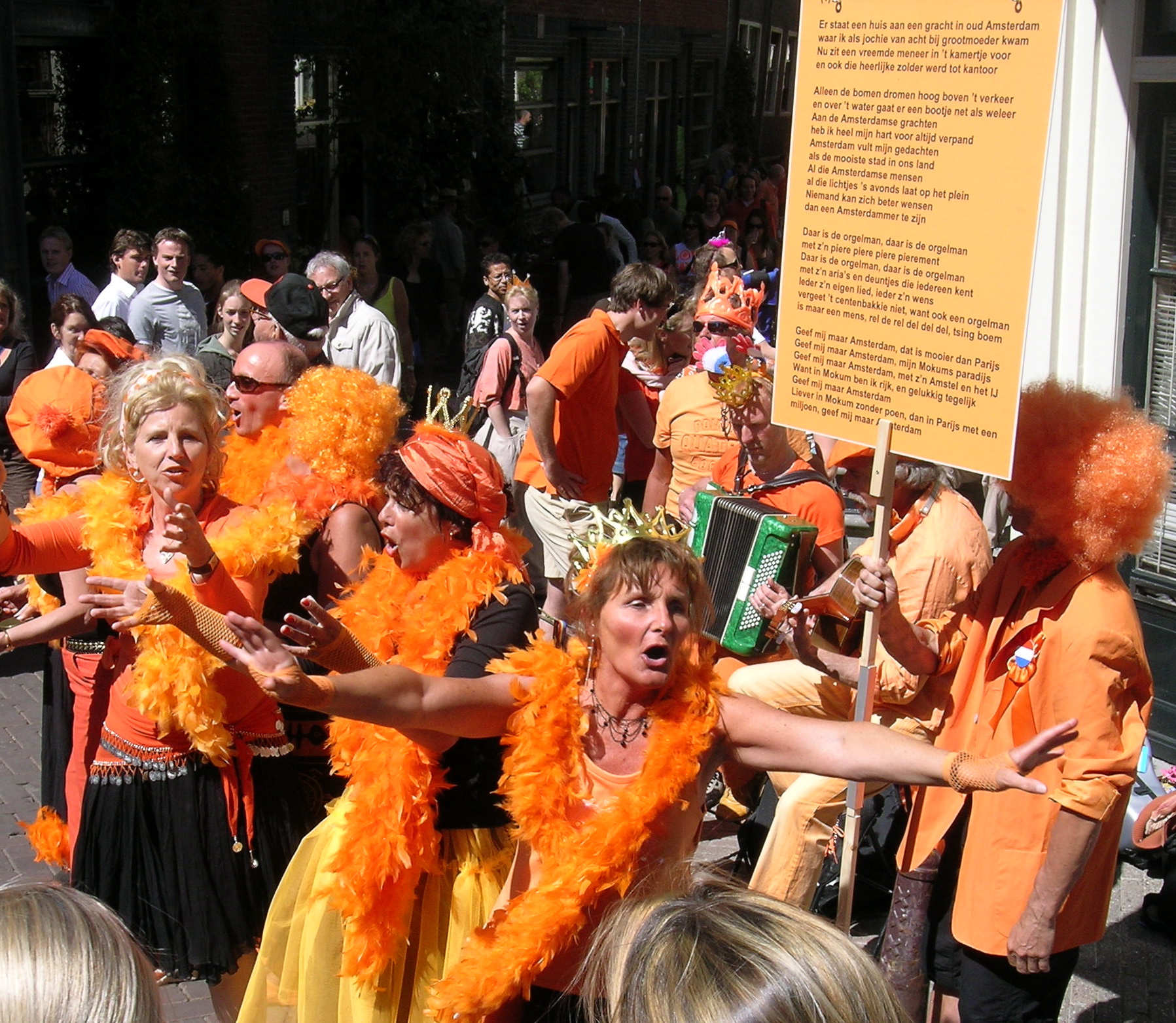
Revellers dressed in orange in Amsterdam, 2007

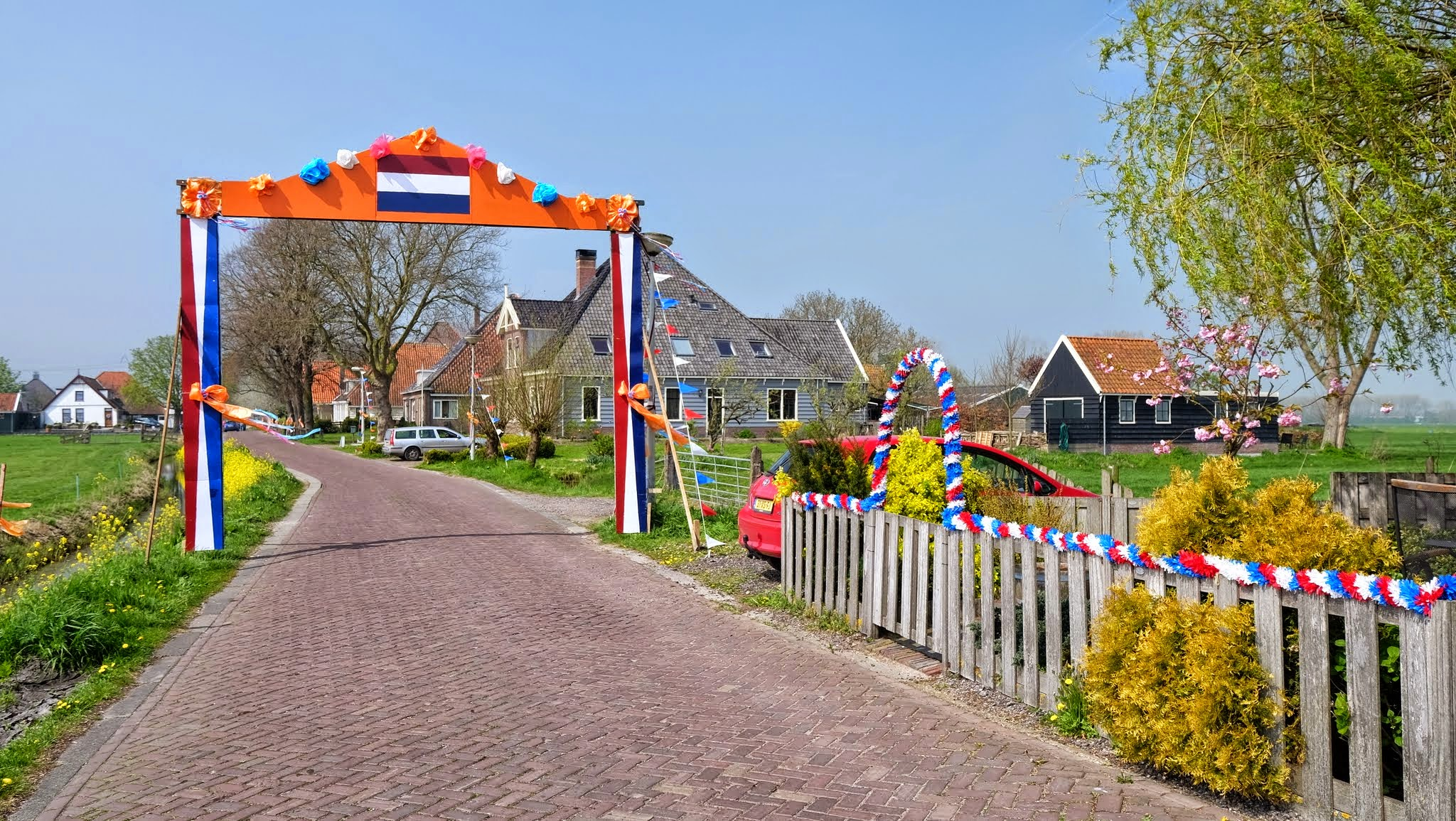
Waterland's Koningsdag bike race, 2015

Koningsdag now sees large-scale celebrations, with many concerts and special events in public spaces, particularly in Amsterdam. An outdoor concert is held on Amsterdam's Museumplein, where as many as 800,000 people may gather. To aid visitors in returning home by train after the festivities, outdoor events must end by 20:00, and the Museumplein show by 21:00. The city centre is closed to cars, and no trams ride in the heart of the city; people are urged to avoid Amsterdam Centraal railway station and use other stations if possible from their direction. International trains that normally depart or terminate at Amsterdam Centraal are instead directed to a suburban stop.

In recent years parties and concerts have been held the evening before Koningsdag. Until 2013, nightclubs across the Netherlands organised special events for what became known as Koninginnenacht (Queen's Night). Many young people celebrate in the streets and squares (and in Amsterdam, the canals as well) throughout the night, and after all-night partying join the crowds at the vrijmarkt.

While King's Day celebrations take place throughout the Netherlands, Amsterdam is a popular destination for many revellers. Often the city's 850,000 residents are joined by up to 1 million visitors. In recent years Amsterdam authorities have taken some measures to try to stem the flow of visitors as the city became too crowded.

Those taking part in Koningsdag commonly dye their hair orange or wear orange clothing in honour of the House of Orange-Nassau, which rules over the Netherlands. Orange-coloured drinks are also popular. This colour choice is sometimes dubbed "orange madness", or in Dutch, oranjegekte. A local Orange Committee member said of Koninginnedag in 2011:

Friendships—and community—will be formed. For me that's really what Queen's Day is all about. It's not an outburst of patriotism, it's not even about the popularity of the royal family. It's about a sense of belonging. For one day, everybody is the same in Holland. Bright orange and barmy.

Children celebrate with a variety of games including koekhappen (in which they catch spice cake dangling from a string in their mouths) and spijker poepen (in which they tie string around their waist with a nail dangling at one end, which they attempt to lower into a glass bottle).

==== Festivals ====
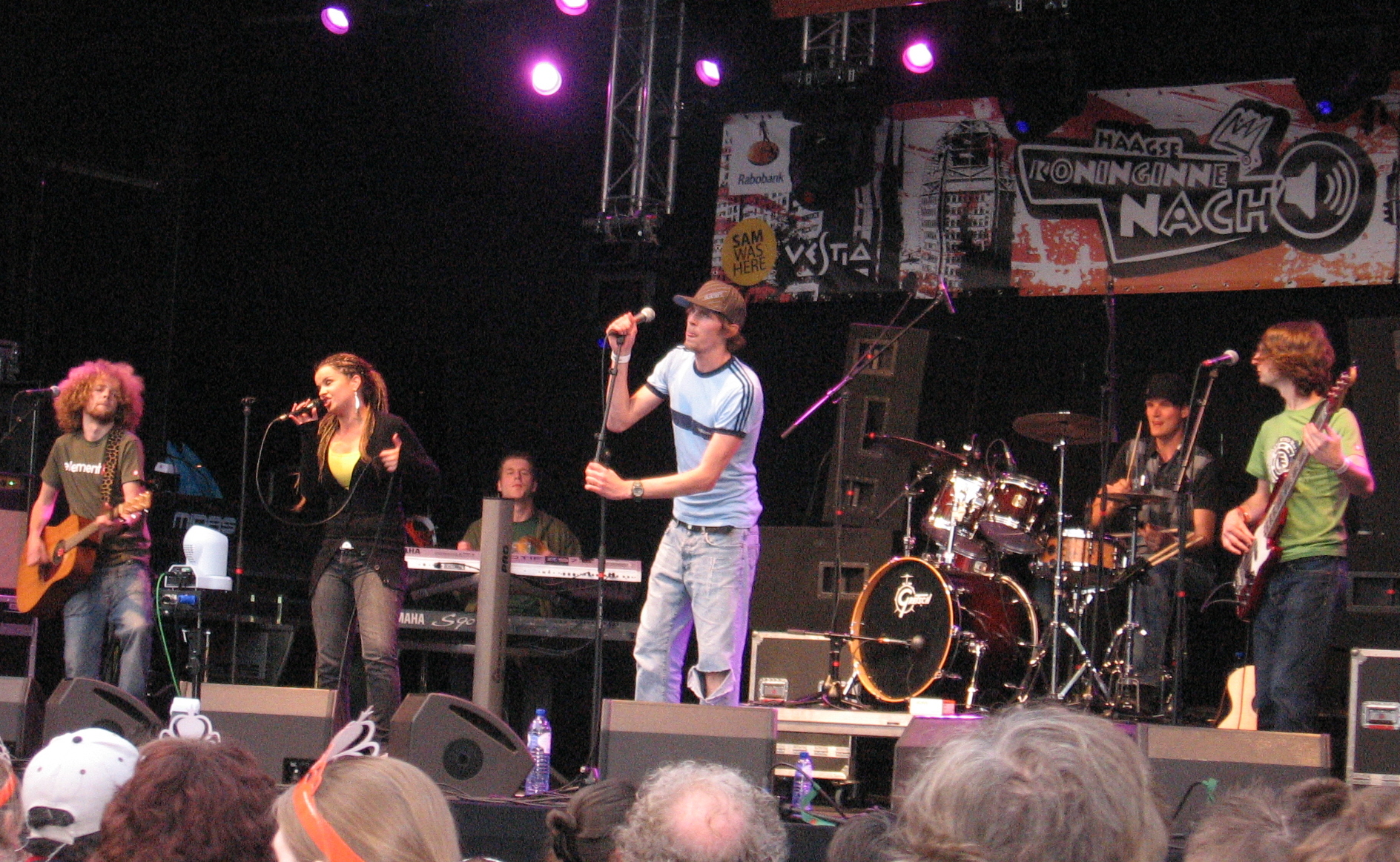
Concert by Leaf in The Hague during Koninginnenacht, 2008

Many music festivals are also organised on King's Day. Major and well-known festivals include 538 Koningsdag, a music festival hosted since 1993 by the Dutch radiostation 538, Kingsland (since 2013), hosted in Amsterdam, Groningen and Rotterdam, Supersized Kingsday, a hardcore/hardstyle festival hosted since 2014 by B2S, Kingdance (Zwolle, formerly known as Queendance), hosted since 2010, and numerous techno festivals such as Oranjebitter (Rotterdam), Loveland van Oranje (Amsterdam), Oranjebloesem (Amsterdam), Free Your Mind Orange Edition/Kingsday (Arnhem, Breda).

=== Honours ===
Koningsdag is an opportunity for the monarch to honour citizens for their service to the Netherlands. In 2011, Queen Beatrix issued an honours list noting the work of 3,357 people, most of whom became members of the Order of Orange-Nassau.

== Observance in Dutch territories outside Europe ==
Koningsdag is also celebrated in Aruba, Curaçao, and Sint Maarten, constituent countries of the Kingdom of the Netherlands. It is less widely celebrated on the Caribbean island of Bonaire, also a part of the Kingdom, where the local celebration of Dia di Rincon (held on 30 April) is more popular.

== See also ==
- The Emperor's Birthday in Japan
- Grand Duke's Official Birthday in Luxembourg
- King's Feast in Belgium
- King's Official Birthday in the United Kingdom and Commonwealth Realms
